= 1939–40 USM Blida season =

USM Blida
1939–40 season
- Stadium: FCB Stadium (actual Zoubir Zouraghi Stadium)
- First Division: 3rd
- Coupe de la Ligue: Round of 16
- Top goalscorer: League: Bendjiar (6 goals); All: Bendjiar (8 goals)
Home colours

In the 1939–40 season, USM Blida is competing in the First Division for the 7th season French colonial era, as well as the Forconi Cup. They will be competing in First Division, and the Coupe de la Ligue.

== Non-competitive ==
=== Overview ===
Competition	Record							
Competition	G	W	D	L	GF	GA	GD	Win %
Championnat	12	5	5	2	22	11	+11	41.67
Coupe de la Ligue	1	0	0	1	2	5	−3	0.00
Total	13	5	5	3	24	16	+8	38.46

== League table ==
=== Group A ===
1939–40 League Algiers Standings

Pos	Team	Pld	W	D	L	F	A	GD	Pts	Notes
1	FC Blida	12	9	1	2	37	13	+24	31	
2	MC Alger	12	8	2	2	42	12	+30	30	Participates in the first tournament
3	O. Hussein Dey	12	6	4	2	28	15	+13	28	
4	USM Blida	12	5	5	2	22	11	+11	27	
5	AS Boufarik	12	4	2	6	24	22	+12	22	
6	OM Ruisseau	12	1	1	10	9	41	-32	15	
7	RAS Algéroise	12	1	1	10	12	60	-48	15	

== Results ==
Home \ Away	ASB	FCB	MCA	OHD	OMR	RASA	USMB
AS Boufarik		2–3	1–5	0–0	7–1	6–1	4–2
FC Blida	3–1		2–1	0–2	4–0	6–0	1–1
MC Alger	1–0	2–1		3–1	4–2	14–0	1–1
O Hussein Dey	3–0	1–6	2–1		1–1	3–0	0–0
OM Ruisseu	0–1	1–5	0–5	1–4		1–4	0–3
RAS Algérois	2–2	2–4	0–3*	1–10	1–2		1–5
USM Blida	1–0	0–1	2–2	1–1	2–0	4–0	

Updated to match(es) played on March 1940. Source:
Legend: Blue = home team win; Yellow = draw; Red = away team win.

=== Matches ===
Win Draw Loss

29 October 1939 Round 1	OM Ruisseau	0–3	USM Blida	Hussein Dey
13:15	Métayer, Mouhali, Mouloud, Kassasini, Cano, Mayer, Sanmartin Cardonna, Pons, Bensaid, Duffour, Benfiglio	Report	Mohamed Imcaoudène as Bob; Benelfoul I Abdelaziz Chekaïmi Meradi, Mansouri, Farès, Ouzera Kaddour, Chekaïmi, Hamidouche, Benelfoul I, Khelladi, Benelfoul II, Mohamed Imcaoudène as Bob, Hatem	Stadium: Nouvel-Ambert Stadium; Referee: Parienté

5 November 1939 Round 2	USM Blida	1–1	MC Alger	Algiers
13:15	78' Benelfoul I Meradi, Farès, Mansouri, Benazout, Khelladi, Hamidouche, Benelfoul, I, Rdjem, Benelfoul II, Mohamed Imcaoudène as Bob, Hatem	Report	Saib Ali dit Saïd Saïd 75' (pen.) Zitouni, Bouhired, Haddadou, Bencherifa, Dahmoun, Berzig, Bencharif, Missoum, Saib Ali dit Said Said, Vitiello, Albor Jordan	Referee: Garcia

26 November 1939 Round 3	USM Blida	4–0	RAS Algéroise	Blida
14:45	Khelladi; Mohamed Imcaoudène as Bob; Farès; Hamidouche	Report		Stadium: FCB Stadium; Referee: Pulerano

3 December 1939 Round 4	O. Hussein Dey	0–0	USM Blida	Hussein-Dey
14:45		Report		Referee: Busso

10 December 1949 Round 5	AS Boufarik	4–2	USM Blida	Boufarik
14:45	Defrance 10'; Farès 15' (o.g.); Gotvallès 60'; Lopez 65'	Report	62' Benelfoul; 86' ? Meradi; Farès, Mansouri, Hamidouche, Chekaïmi, Kaddour Ouzera, Benelfoul I, Bob, Khelladi, Benelfoul II, Hatem	Stadium: Stade des Quinconces

24 December 1939 Round 6	USM Blida	0–1	FC Blida	Blida
14:45	Meradi, Hamidouche, Mohamed Imcaoudène as Bob, Farès, Benelfoul	Report	Boccheciampe 65' Janinazzi, Pons, Boccheciampe, Guarinos...	Stadium: FCB Stadium; Attendance: 3,000; Referee: Todori

14 January 1940 Round 7	USM Blida	2–0	OM Ruisseau	Blida
14:45	Khelladi Meradi; Laid, Mansouri, Hamidouche, Kaddour Ouzera, Bibicha, Benelfoul, Khelladi, Bob, Hadj, Hatem	Report		Stadium: Stade du USB; Referee: Marquès

28 January 1940 Round 8	MC Alger	2–2	USM Blida	Blida
14:45	Kermouche Hassen; Albor Jordan Branki; Dahman, Haddadou; Vitiello, Abdelaoui, Touati; Missoum, Hassen, Albor, Saib, Bénouna	Report	Hamidouche 5' (pen.); Ahmed Benelfoul 89' Meradi; Farès, Mansouri; Bibicha, Omar, Hénini; Benelfoul, Hamidouche, Bob, Djoudad, Hatem	Stadium: USB; Referee: Boccheciampe

4 February 1940 Round 9	USM Blida	1–0	AS Boufarik	Blida
14:45	Mustapha Bendjiar Meradi, Mansouri, Farès, Henini, Hamidouche, Ouzera, Benelfoul, Khelladi, Bendjiar, Mohamed Imcaoudène as Bob, Hatem	Report	Bataillon, Massip A, Massip M, Oltra, Kader, Salanamanopra, Herzienne, Irlès, Gilly, Grégori, Defrance	Stadium: USB; Referee: Baroni

18 February 1940 Round 10	RAS Algéroise	1–5	USM Blida	Alger
14:45	? ?' Laleg, Desti, Bouteiller, Katal, Joly, Jamin, Poulalion, Ribés, Gisbert, Bournane	Report	10' Mohamed Imcaoudène as Bob; Mustapha Bendjiar Abdelaziz, Farès, Mansouri, Bibicha, Chekaïmi, Henini, Benelfoul, Khelladi, Bendjiar, Mohamed Imcaoudène as Bob, Hamidouche	Stadium: Stade Lebon; Referee: Pulcrano

25 February 1940 Round 11	USM Blida	1–1	O. Hussein Dey	Blida
14:45	Mohamed Imcaoudène as Bob 20' Meradi, Farès, Mansouri, Henini, Hamidouche, Ouzera, Benelfoul, Belhadj, Bendjiar, Mohamed Imcaoudène as Bob, Djoudad	Report	Alcaraz 88' Kaoua, Montovani, Molina, Marzo, Isker II, Abordène, Alcaraz, Amalfitano, Isker I, Hausberger, Rosello	Stadium: Stade du FCB

17 March 1940 Round 12	FC Blida	1–1	USM Blida	Blida
14:45	Bocchéciampe 50' Pérez, Labattut, Vals, Samary Y, Pons, Samary III, Hernandez, Garinos, Bocchéciampe II, Fuster, Bocchéciampe	Report	Bendjiar 75' Abdelaziz Meradi, Farès, Mansouri, Kaddour Bibicha, Chekaïmi, Henini, Benelfoul, Khelladi, Bendjiar, Mohamed Imcaoudène as Bob, Hamidouche	Stadium: Stade du FCB; Referee: Grazianni

== Coupe de la Ligue d'Alger ==
21 April 1940 Round of 16	RU Alger	5–2	USM Blida	Saint Eugène
16:00	Vidal; Broué; Couard; Vidal Fourest, Oliver, Couard II, Faglin, Couard I, Samuel, Brouillé, Vidal, Trappe, Cépi, Bernard	Report	1' Bendjiar; Benelfoul Meradi, Farès, Mansouri, Bibicha, Hamidouche, Zidoun, Benelfoul, Khelladi, Bendjiar, Imcaoudène as Bob, Bouamra	Stadium: Stade Roger Lapergue; Referee: Todori

== Players statistics ==
No.	Pos	Nat	Player	Total		League		League Cup	
No.	Pos	Nat	Player	Apps	Goals	Apps	Goals	Apps	Goals
Goalkeepers
	GK	(Algeria) ALG	Abdelaziz Meradi (Ex-FCB)	13	0	12	0	1	0
Defenders
	DF	(Algeria) ALG	Ali Mansouri as Ali Doudou	13	0	12	0	1	0
	DF	(Algeria) ALG	Mohamed Farès (Ex-ASB)	13	1	12	1	1	0
	DF	(Algeria) ALG	Kaddour Ouzera (Ex-FCB)	5	0	4	0	1	0
	DF	(Algeria) ALG	Laid	0	0	-	-	-	-
	DF	(Algeria) ALG	Ripoll	0	0	-	-	-	-
	DF	(Algeria) ALG	Allègre	0	0	-	-	-	-
Midfielders
	MF	(Algeria) ALG	Ali Hamidouche (Ex-ASB)	13	2	12	2	1	0
	MF	(Algeria) ALG	Mohamed Imcaoudène as Bob (Ex-FCB)	13	4	12	4	1	0
	MF	(Algeria) ALG	Abdelaziz Chekaimi (Ex-FCB)	4	1	4	1	0	0
	MF	(Algeria) ALG	Hanini	4	0	4	0	0	0
	MF	(Algeria) ALG	Benazout	1	0	1	0	0	0
	MF	(Algeria) ALG	Omar Oussani (Ex-ASB)	1	0	0	0	1	0
	DF	(Algeria) ALG	Mellal	0	0	-	-	-	-
	DF	(Algeria) ALG	Sylvestre	0	0	-	-	-	-
Forwards
	FW	(Algeria) ALG	Ahmed Benelfoul (Ex-ASB)	13	4	12	4	1	0
	FW	(Algeria) ALG	Mustapha Bendjiar	13	6	12	6	1	0
	FW	(Algeria) ALG	Ahmed Khelladi	13	3	12	3	1	0
	FW	(Algeria) ALG	Abderrahmane Hatem	3	0	3	0	0	0
	FW	(Algeria) ALG	Mohamed Benelfoul (Ex-ASB)	3	1	2	0	1	1
	FW	(Algeria) ALG	Bouamra	1	0	0	0	1	0
	MF	(Algeria) ALG	Ardjem Kaddour (Ex-ASB)	1	0	1	0	0	0

== Transfers ==
=== In ===
Pos	Player	From club
MF	Mohamed Imcaoudène	FC Blida
GK	Abdelaziz Meradi	FC Blida
DF	Mohamed Farès	AS Boufarik

=== Out ===
Pos	Player	From club
	Pelage	FC Blida
