= 1948–49 USM Blida season =

USM Blida
1948–49 season
- President: Hamid Kassoul
- Head coach: Mohamed Khelifa
- Stadium: FCB Stadium
- Division Honneur: 8th
- Forconi Cup: Sixth Round
- Top goalscorer: League: Sid Ali Mahieddine (16); All: Sid Ali Mahieddine (17)
Home colours

In the 1948–49 season, USM Blida is competing in the Division Honneur for the 16th season French colonial era, as well as the Forconi Cup. They will be competing in Division Honneur, and the North African Cup.

== Friendly ==
Win Draw Loss

12 September 1948	FC Blida	2–2	USM Blida	Blida
		Report		Stadium: FCB
Note: Friendly

12 October 1948	USM Blida	4–3	Olympique de Médéa	Blida
		(2–1); Report		Stadium: FCB
Note: Semi-Final of Tournament Aid el-Kebir, (USMB 4-3 OM and FC Blida 1-1 (corner) WR Belcourt)

12 October 1948	USM Blida	5–1	FC Blida	Blida
		Report		Stadium: FCB
Note: Final of Tournament Aid el-Kebir

24 December 1948	US Tunisienne (Tunisia)	4–1	USM Blida	Tunis
		Report
Note: Friendly

25 December 1948	CS Hammam Lif (Tunisia)	3–0	USM Blida	Tunis
		Report
Note: Friendly

== Competitions ==
=== Overview ===
Competition	Record							
Competition	G	W	D	L	GF	GA	GD	Win %
Division Honneur	22	7	6	9	36	33	+3	31.82
Forconi Cup	3	2	0	1	7	6	+1	66.67
Total	25	9	6	10	43	39	+4	36.00

== Division Honneur ==
=== League table ===
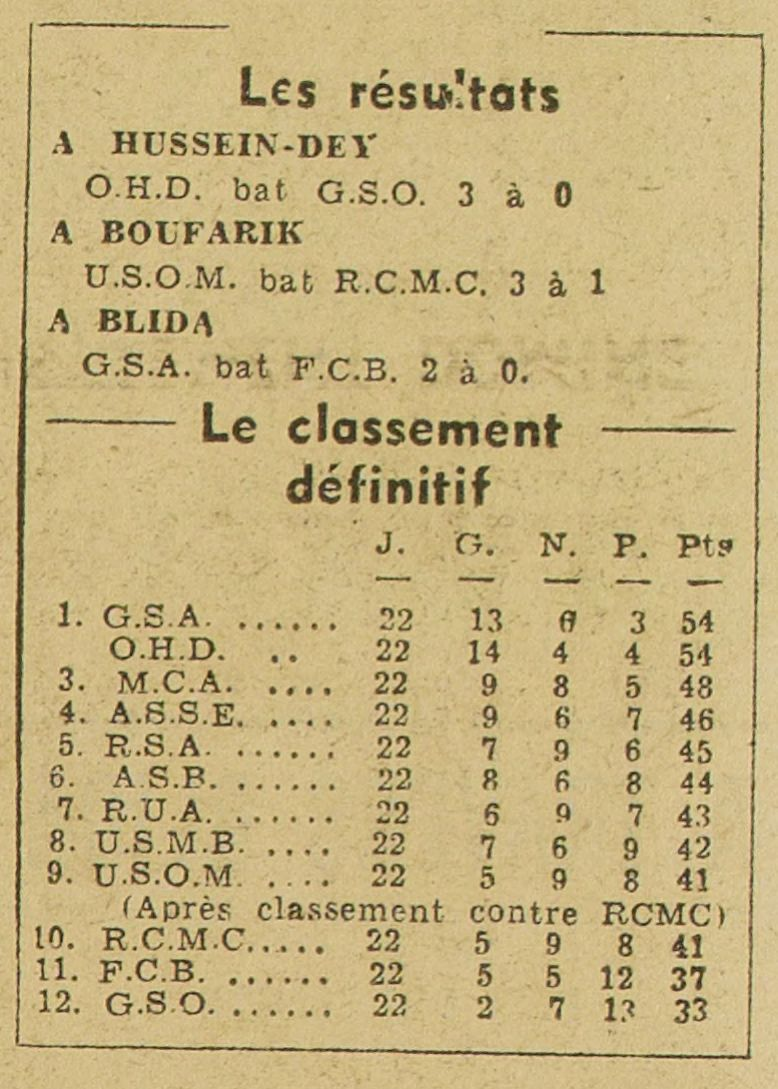
1948–49 League Algiers Standings

Pos	Team	Pld	W	D	L	F	A	GD	Pts	Notes
1	Gallia SA	22	13	6	3	0	0	0	54	
2	Olympique Hussein Dey	22	14	4	4	0	0	0	54	
3	MC Alger	22	9	8	5	0	0	0	48	
4	AS Saint Eugène	22	9	6	7	0	0	0	46	
5	RS Alger	22	7	9	6	0	0	0	45	
6	AS Boufarik	22	8	6	8	0	0	0	44	
7	RU Alger	22	6	9	7	0	0	0	43	
8	USM Blida	22	7	6	9	36	33	+2	42	
9	US Ouest Mitdja	22	5	9	8	0	0	0	41	
10	RC Maison Carré	22	5	9	8	0	0	0	41	
11	FC Blida	22	5	5	12	0	0	0	37	
12	GS Orléansville	22	2	7	13	0	0	0	33	

=== Matches ===
Win Draw Loss

26 September 1948 1	AS Saint Eugène	2–1	USM Blida	Saint Eugène
	Benet; Bendinelli Fortin, Vidal, Aboulker, Stepanoff, Castaldi, de Villeneuve, Rivas, Bendinelli, Benet, Mazella, Bénéjean	(0–0); Report	Bensamet 46' Menacer, Mansouri, Yahia, Zahzah, Zidoun, Zouraghi, Bob, Hadji, Bensamet, Benelfoul, Mahieddine	Referee: Graziani

3 October 1948 2	USM Blida	1–1	RC Maison-Carrée	Blida
15:30	Mahieddine 70' Menacer, Zerrouki, Mansouri, Boualem Zouakou, Bensamet, Zouraghi, Mahieddine, Benelfoul, Hadji, Khelifa, Yahia	(0–1); Report	Marcellin 3' Escallès, Maziz, Roux, Poumaroux, Séguy, Picot, Sellal, Bon, Roig, Marcellin, Kreuger	Stadium: FCB; Referee: Seyguevaques

10 October 1948 3	O Hussein Dey	0–1	USM Blida	Hussein Dey
15:00	Ehrard, Fiol, Cantino, Mascaro, Ouzifi, Belamine, Sinès, Bacadja, Gomez, Scriba, Fez	(0–1); Report	Khelifa 55' Menacer, Zerrouki, Mansouri, Zouakou, Yahia, Zouraghi, Bensamet, Benelfoul, Mahieddine, Khelifa, Ferhat	Stadium: OHD; Referee: Baroni

24 October 1948 4	USM Blida	4–1	GS Alger	Blida
	Mahieddine 4', 90'; Khelifa 10'; Bensamet 60' Menacer, Zerrouki, Zouakou, Yahia, Mansouri, Bob, Bensamet, Khelifa, Mahieddine, Benelfoul, Laidi	(2–0); Report	Deléo 85' Messina, Daverio, Belmonte, Vitiello, Calmus, Torrès, Biton, Fortune, Calmus Robert, Bagur, Déléo	Stadium: FCB; Referee: Rivieccio

11 November 1948 5	FC Blida	0–2	USM Blida	Blida
	Picot, Pellegrini, Pignol, Arnau, Antoine, Foissac, Hasni, Fuster, Ruiz, Camand Rollet	(0–2); Report	Khelifa 30'; Benelfoul 52' Menacer, Zerrouki, Zouakou, Mansouri, Zouraghi, Bensamet, Bob, Benelfoul, Khelifa, Mahieddine, Yahia	Stadium: FCB

14 November 1948 6	USM Blida	6–2	US Ouest Mitidja	Blida
	Bensamet 18'; Mahieddine 30', 42'; Khelifa 70'; Bob 40' (pen.), 75' Menacer, Zerrouki, Mansouri, Zouakou, Yahia, Zouraghi, Bob, Benelfoul, Bensamet, Mahieddine, Khelifa	(4–0); Report	Trilha 65'; Schmitt 90' Manchon, Delfent, Rouquier, Saes, Garcia,, Hubert, Trias, Bottaro, Schmitt, Berkaoui, Ramon	Stadium: FCB; Referee: Roméro

21 November 1948 7	MC Alger	0–0	USM Blida	Saint Eugène
	Abtouche, Hamoutène, Tadjet, Khabatou, Abdelaoui, Benhamou Hamid, Ait Saâda Mohamed, Bennour, Hahad, Kouar Sid Ahmed, Azef	Report	Menacer, Yahia, Mansouri, Zerrouki, Benelfoul, Zouraghi, Bensamet, Khelifa, Mahieddine, Bob, Ferfera	Stadium: Municipal; Referee: Graziani

28 November 1948 8	USM Blida	3–0	GS Orléansville	Blida
	Mahieddine 44', 55'; Bensamet 85' Menacer, Zerrouki, Mansouri, Yahia, Benelfoul, Zouraghi, Bensamet, Bob, Mahieddine, Khelifa, Ferfera	(2–0); Report	Merle, Mellet, Moussaoui, Tida, Auber, Canto, Maeza, Mokrane, Couvret, Nassri, Daoud	Stadium: FCB; Referee: Belkessa

12 December 1948 9	AS Boufarik	3–3	USM Blida	Boufarik
	Massip II 4'; Defrance 6', 90' (pen.) Gervais, Massip II, Cortès, Vicédo, Chazot, Gottvallès, Massip I, Reichert, Defrance, Pérez, Navarro	(2–1); Report	Imcaoudène as Bob 30'; Mahieddine 35', 55' Menacer, Zerrouki, Zouakou, Mansouri, Yahia, Zouraghi, Bensamet, Bob, Benelfoul, Khelifa, Mahieddine

19 December 1948 10	RU Alger	2–1	USM Blida	Algiers
	Jasseron; Trappe 85' Trouillas, Brouillet, Gilles, Bouvier, Vidal, Jasseron, Trappe, Faglin, Bayle, Lorenzo, Daube	Report	Khelifa Meradi, Zerrouki, Zouakou, Zidoun, Mansouri, Yahia, Benelfoul, Khelifa, Mahieddine, Branci, Bob

9 January 1949 11	USM Blida	2–4	RS Alger	Blida
	Mahieddine 38', 40' Meradi, Mansouri, Zerrouki, Zouraghi, Benelfoul, Yahia, Hadji, X, Mahieddine, Bob, Khelifa	(2–1); Report	Buffard 1', 65'; Pénalva 20'; Ponsetti 85' Guth, Giuganti, Caillat, Senane, Magliozi, Ganem, Buffard, Ponsetti, Falandry, Impérato, Caillat	Stadium: FCB

16 January 1949 12	USM Blida	1–1	AS Saint Eugène	Blida
	Mahieddine Meradi, Zouraghi, Mansouri, Hadji, Zahzah, Zouakou, Mahieddine, Khelifa, Benelfoul, Reguieg, Lekhal	(0–1); Report	Bendinelli 20' Fortin, Vidal, Aboulker, Stépanof, de Villeneuve, Oliver, Bendinelli, Castaldi, Paone, Rivas, Mazella	Stadium: FCB; Referee: Pellegrineschi

23 January 1949 13	RC Maison-Carrée	0–2	USM Blida	Maison-Carrée
	Escallès, Roux, Poumaroux, Lastenet, Maziz, Pico, Sellal I, Segui, Lucet, Marcelin, Kreugel	(0–2); Report	Khelifa 22'; Mahieddine 36' Menacer, Reguieg, Zerrouki, Mansouri, Khelifa, Benelfoul, Bensamet, Hadji, Mahieddine, Lekhal, Zouraghi

30 January 1949 14	USM Blida	3–3	O Hussein Dey	Blida
	Mahieddine 15', 35'; Lekhal 30' Menacer, Zerrouki, Mansouri, Hadji, Reguieg, Zouraghi, Bensamet, Benelfoul, Mahieddine, Khelifa, Lekhal	(3–0); Report	Gomez 60'; Sintès 70'; Ouzifi 80' Erhard, Montovani, Cantino, Mascaro, Sintès, Ouzifi, Gomez, Molina, Belhamine, Sriba, Fez	Stadium: FCB; Referee: Todori

20 February 1949 15	GS Alger	2–0	USM Blida	Algiers
	Calmus Robert 56'; Deléo 66' Testa, Principato, Fortune, Torrès, Ferrasse, Calmus Robert, Déléo, Bagur, Vitiello, Calmus, Roger, Biton	(0–0); Report	Meradi, Zerrouki, Zouakou, Reguieg, Mansouri, Zouraghi, Benelfoul, Hadji, Mahieddine, Khelifa, Lekhal	Referee: Boccheciampe

27 February 1949 16	USM Blida	2–1	FC Blida	Blida
	Mahieddine 40'; Khelifa 70' Meradi, Mansouri, Zouakou, Zouraghi, Yahia, Zerrouki, Lekhal, Hadji, Khelifa, Mahieddine, Benelfoul	(1–1); Report	Antoine 27' Rosès, Bachelut, Foissac, Pons, Hasni, Haddad, Arnoult, Cama, Riéra, Antoine, Fuster	Stadium: FCB

13 March 1949 17	US Ouest Mitidja	3–2	USM Blida	El Affroun
	Patia 10' 30'; Cervera Manchon, Rouguier, Defnet, Hubert, Andrada, Gaillard, Batuat, Schmitt, Ratto, Saes, Cervera	(1–1); Report	Mahieddine 40'; Mahieddine (Lekhal?) 89' Meradi, Yahia, Zouakou, Zouraghi, Khelifa, Mansouri, Zerrouki, Mahieddine, Benelfoul, Lekhal, Hadji	Referee: Derradji

20 March 1949 18	USM Blida	0–1	MC Alger	Blida
	Meradi, Zerrouki, Mansouri, Reguieg, Yahia, Zouakou, Khelifa, Zouraghi, Benelfoul, Mahieddine, Lekhal	(0–1); Report	Hahad 32' Belahcène, Khabatou, Tadjet, Hamoutène, Hamid, Kouar II, Ait Saâda, Bennour, Derriche, Kouar I, Hahad	Stadium: FCB; Referee: Garofalo

27 March 1949 19	GS Orléansville	3–0	USM Blida	Orléansville
	Ben Bouali 63' (pen.); Mokrane 68'; Bob (o.g.) Merle, Ben Bouali, Alberti, Tida, Aubert, Melet, Couvret, Houari, Albentoza, Maiza, Mokrane	(0–0); Report	Meradi, Zouakou, Reguieg, Bob, Mansouri, Zouraghi, Bensamet, Hadji, Mahieddine, Khelifa, Lekhal	Referee: Leguevacque

3 April 1949 20	USM Blida	0–1	AS Boufarik	Blida
	Meradi, Zouakou, Mansouri, Zouraghi, Yahia, Benelfoul, Khelifa, Bensamet, Mahieddine, Hadji, Lekhal	(0–0); Report	Gotvallès 80' Hernandez, Massip M, Chazot, Reichert, Vicedo, Gotvallès, Radegonde, Navarro I, Defrance, Pérez, Navarro II	Stadium: FCB; Referee: Attanasio

17 April 1949 21	USM Blida	2–2	RU Alger	Blida
	Mahieddine 80' Menacer, Zouakou, Yahia, Mansouri, Benelfoul, Zouraghi, Bensamet, Khelifa, Mahieddine, Hadji, Lekhal	(0–1); Report	Daube; Vidal Trouillas, Brouillet, Bouvier, Lavonnier, Gemyf, Jasseron, Poizat, Daube, Vivès, Vidal	Stadium: FCB; Referee: Lebeuvant

24 April 1949 22	RS Alger	1–0	USM Blida	Algiers
	Ponseti Guth, Guiganti, Magliozzi, Clément, Senane, Ghanem, Maouch, Saâdi, Ponseti, Zérapha, Garcia	(0–0); Report	Menacer, Reguieg, Mansouri, Zouakou, Yahia, Zouraghi, Hadji, Khelifa, Benelfoul, Mahieddine, Lekhal	Stadium: Municipal; Referee: Caratino

== Forconi Cup ==
17 October 1948 4th Round	Olympic Littoral	0–2	USM Blida	Guyotville
14:30	Gilles, Begli, Frachal, Bourvil, Pas, Salvano, Garcia, Tortoza, Huertas, Mercurio, Moll	Report	Khelifa 60'; Bensamet 87' Menacer, Zerrouki, Mansouri, Zouakou, Yahia, Zouraghi, Bensamet, Ferfera, Khelifa, Mahieddine, Benelfoul	Referee: Caratina

7 November 1948 5th Round	USM Blida	2–1	FC Blida	Blida
14:30	Khelifa 53' (pen.); Mohamed Imecaoudène as Bob 87' Menacer, Zerrouki, Mansouri, Zouakou, Yahia, Zouraghi, Bensamet, Bob, Khelifa, Mahieddine, Benelfoul	Report	Riéra 35' Picot, Pellegrini, Pignol, Antoine, Arnau, Foissac, Riéra, Camaud, Armand Ruiz, Fuster, Nicolas	Stadium: FCB Stadium; Attendance: 2,233; Referee: Boccechiampe

5 December 1948 Quarter-final	Red Star Alger	5–3 (a.e.t.)	USM Blida	Saint Eugène
14:30	Falandry; Buffard ?' (pen.); Ponseti Guth, Giganti, Caillat, Senane, Penalva, Magliozi, Falandry, Ponseti, Imperato, Ganem, Buffard	Report	Yahia; Mahieddine 50'; Benelfoul Menacer, Zerrouki, Mansouri, Zouakou, Yahia, Zouraghi, Bensamet, Bob, Khelifa, Mahieddine, Benelfoul	Stadium: Stade Communal Saint Eugène; Attendance: 5,978; Referee: M. Riveccio

== Squad statistics ==
=== Playing statistics ===
Pos.	Name	Division Honneur																						Forconi Cup			Total
Pos.	Name	1	2	3	4	5	6	7	8	9	10	11	12	13	14	15	16	17	18	19	20	21	22	1	2	3	Total
GK	(Algeria) Menacer	X	X	X	X	X	X	X	X	X				X	X							X	X	X	X	X	16
GK	(Algeria) Meradi										X	X	X			X	X	X	X	X	X						9
DF	(Algeria) Mansouri	X	X	X	X	X	X	X	X	X	X	X	X	X	X	X	X	X	X	X	X	X	X	X	X	X	25
DF	(Algeria) Yahia	X	X	X	X	X	X	X	X	X	X	X					X	X	X		X	X	X	X	X	X	21
DF	(Algeria) Zerrouki		X	X	X	X	X	X	X	X	X	X		X	X	X	X	X	X					X	X	X	18
DF	(Algeria) Reguieg												X	X	X	X			X	X			X				7
DF	(Algeria) Zahzah	X											X														2
MF	(Algeria) Zouraghi	X	X	X		X	X	X	X	X		X	X	X	X	X	X	X	X	X	X	X	X	X	X	X	23
MF	(Algeria) Zouakou		X	X	X	X	X			X	X		X			X	X	X	X	X	X	X	X	X	X	X	19
MF	(Algeria) Bob	X			X	X	X	X	X	X	X	X								X					X	X	12
MF	(Algeria) Zidoun	X									X																2
MF	(Algeria) Laidi				X																						1
FW	(Algeria) Mahieddine	X	X	X	X	X	X	X	X	X	X	X	X	X	X	X	X	X	X	X	X	X	X	X	X	X	25
FW	(Algeria) Khelifa		X	X	X	X	X	X	X	X	X	X	X	X	X	X	X	X	X	X	X	X	X	X	X	X	24
FW	(Algeria) Benelfoul	X	X	X	X	X	X	X	X	X	X	X	X	X	X	X	X	X	X		X	X	X	X	X	X	24
FW	(Algeria) Bensamet	X	X	X	X	X	X	X	X	X				X	X					X	X	X		X	X	X	17
FW	(Algeria) Hadji	X	X									X	X	X	X	X	X	X		X	X	X	X				13
FW	(Algeria) Lekhal												X	X	X	X	X	X	X	X	X	X	X				11
FW	(Algeria) Ferfera							X	X															X			3
FW	(Algeria) Ferhat			X																							1
FW	(Algeria) Branci										X																1

=== Goalscorers ===
Includes all competitive matches. The list is sorted alphabetically by surname when total goals are equal.

Nat.	Player	Pos.	DH	FC	TOTAL
(Algeria)	Sid Ali Mahieddine	FW	16	1	17
(Algeria)	Mohamed Khelifa	FW	8	2	10
(Algeria)	Kaddour Bensamet	MF	3	1	4
(Algeria)	Mohamed Imcaoudène as Bob	MF	3	1	4
(Algeria)	Ahmed Benelfoul	FW	2	1	3
(Algeria)	Abdelkrim Lekhal	FW	2	0	2
(Algeria)	Yahia	DF	0	1	1
Unknown			1	0	1
Own Goals			1	0	1
Totals			36	7	43

== Transfers ==
=== In ===
Pos	Player	From club
FW	Zerrouk Ferfera	US Blida
DF	Ahmed Zouakou	US Blida
FW	Sid Ali Mahieddine	US Blida
DF	Yahia Soum	US Blida
FW	Abdelkrim Lekhal	US Ouest Mitidja
FW	Rachid Hadji	US Ouest Mitidja

=== Out ===
Pos	Player	From club
FW	Ahmed Bernou	FRA SO Montpellier
FW	Abderrahmane Hatem	WA Boufarik
DF	Belkacem Bouguerra II	
