= 1937–38 USM Blida season =

USM Blida
1937–38 season
- President: Hamid Kassoul
- Head coach: DTS: Ahmed Houari; Manager: Omar Ksentini
- Stadium: FCB Stadium
- Second Division: 1st
- North African Cup: 2nd Round
- Top goalscorer: League: Omar Oucifi (11); All: Omar Oucifi (15)
Home colours

In the 1937–38 season, USM Blida is competing in the Second Division for the 5th season French colonial era, as well as the Forconi Cup, and the North African Cup.

== Pre-season ==
5 September 1937	US Ouest Mitidja	5–0	USM Blida	Mouzaïa
			Moréna, Alègre, Houari, Abderrezak, Mellal, Sylvestre, Hatem, Khelladi, Négro, Abbassi, Zahout	Referee: M. Badaoui
Note: Friendly

== Competitions ==
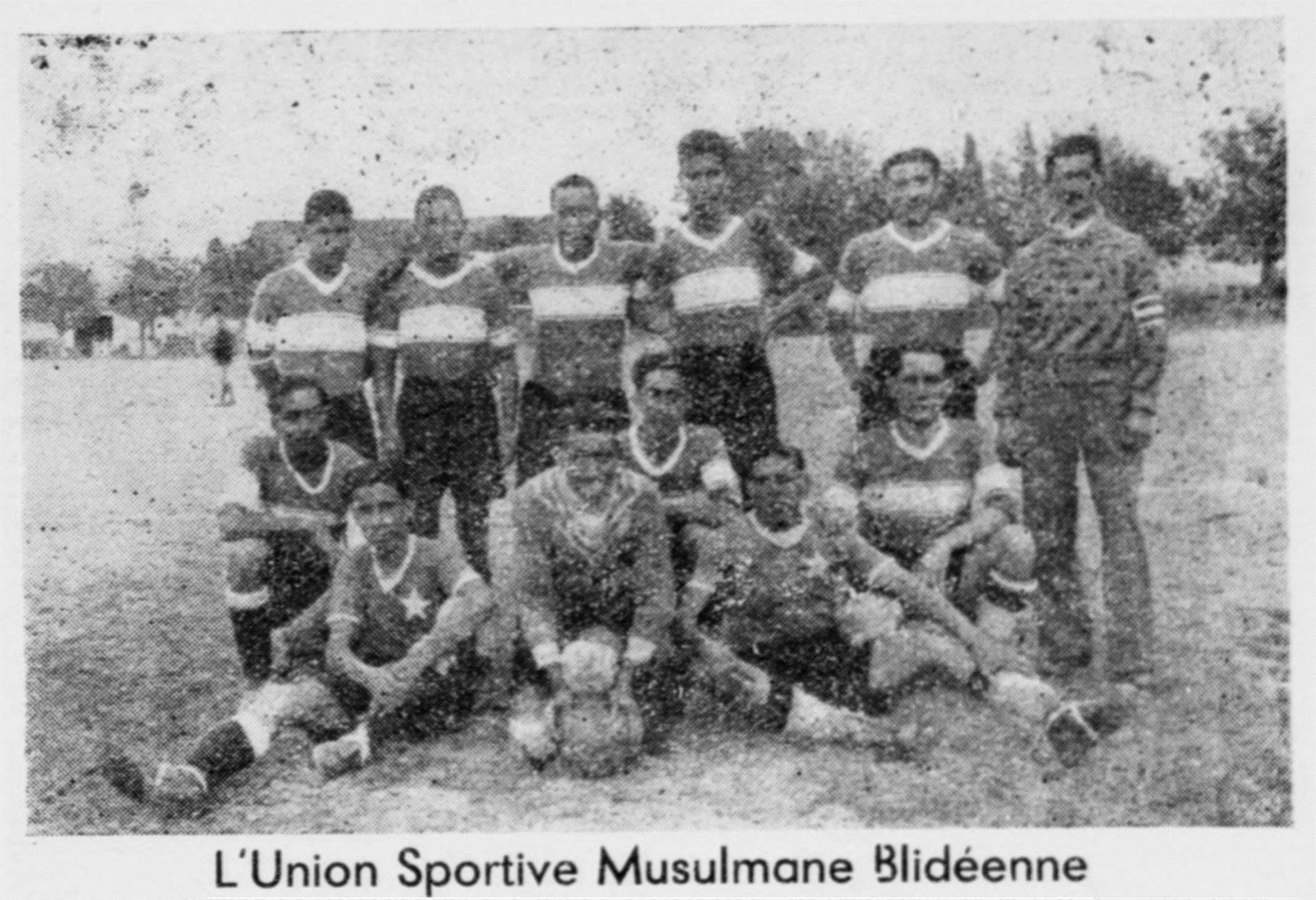
USM Blida Team in 1937

USM Blida 1937–38

=== Overview ===
Competition	Record							
Competition	G	W	D	L	GF	GA	GD	Win %
Second Division	12	8	4	0	29	16	+13	66.67
Play-off	3	2	1	0	6	1	+5	66.67
North African Cup	2	1	0	1	3	3	+0	50.00
Total	17	11	5	1	38	20	+18	64.71

=== Second Division ===
Win Draw Loss

3 October 1937 1	SC Médéa	1–1	USM Blida	Médéa
		Report	Moréna; Laïd, Nacer; Mellal, Khelladi, Sylvestre; Pelage (c), Hatem, Négro, Bouaïfer, Djebbouri

10 October 1937 2	SCU El-Biar	1–2	USM Blida	El Biar
	85'	Report	Omar Négro 50'; Hatem 70' Moréna; Laïd, Nacer; Mellal, Khelladi, Sylvestre; Pelage (c), Hatem, Négro, Bouaïfer, Djebbouri	Referee: Clerget

17 October 1937 3	USM Blida	6–2	FC Kouba	Blida
	Hatem 5'; Omar Négro 42'; Pelage; Bouaïfer; Moréna 85' (pen.) Moréna; Laïd, Alègre (c); Mellal, Khelladi, Sylvestre; Pelage, Hatem, Négro, Djebbouri, Bouaïfer	Report		Stadium: FCB; Referee: Coppa

7 November 1937 4	AS Trèfle-Algérois	2–2	USM Blida	Saoula
		Report	Omar Négro 20', 60' Moréna; Laïd, Alègre (c); Mellal, Khelladi, Sylvestre; Pelage, Hatem, Négro, Djebbouri, Bouaïfer	Referee: Attanasio

28 November 1937 5	USM Blida	3–1	AS Lebon	Blida
	Omar Négro 15' Moréna; Said Laïd, Alègre (c); Mellal, Khelladi, Sylvestre; Pelage, Hatem, Négro, Djebbouri, Bouaïfer	Report; Report	88' Macia, Doménech, Greder, Yajoura, Deradji Belhadj, Argimbaut, Pérez, Merou (c), Abdeadou Zobel	Stadium: USB; Referee: Graziani

12 December 1937 6	USM Blida	2–1	AS Douéra	Blida
	Hatem 60'; Pelage 80' Moréna; Laïd, Alègre (c); Mellal, Khelladi, Sylvestre; Pelage, Hatem, Négro, Djebbouri, Bouaïfer	Report	65'	Referee: Attanasio

9 January 1938 7	USM Blida	3–1	SC Médéa	Blida
	Omar Négro; Pelage Moréna; Laïd, Alègre (c); Mellal, Khelladi, Sylvestre; Pelage, Hatem, Négro, Djebbouri, Abbassi	Report	Goal	Referee: Coppa

16 January 1938 8	USM Blida	3–3	SCU El Biar	Blida
	Pelage 10'; Hatem 30'; Omar Négro Moréna; Laïd, Alègre (c); Abbassi, Khelladi, Sylvestre; Pelage, Hatem, Négro, Djebbouri, Bouaïfer	Report	Carduna 15' ? 44'; Pasquier	Stadium: USB; Referee: Boccheciamp

30 January 1938 9	FC Kouba	1–2	USM Blida	Kouba
		Report	Hatem; Bouaïfer Moréna; Laïd, Alègre; Mellal, Khelladi, Sylvestre; Pelage, Hatem, Négro, Abbassi, Bouaïfer	Referee: Jouve

13 February 1938 10	USM Blida	1–0	AS Trèfle-Algérois	Blida
	Bouaïfer Moréna; Laïd, Alègre (c); Mellal, Khelladi, Sylvestre; Pelage, Hatem, Négro, Abbassi, Bouaïfer	Report	Bayada, Crabos, Abbas, Fracès, Rehlaoui, Karassam, Boudina, Kasdali, Claressa, Mascaro	Stadium: FCB; Referee: Pellicer

27 February 1938 11	AS Lebon	2–3	USM Blida	Ruisseau
		Report	Moréna; Laïd, Alègre; Mellal, Khelladi, Sylvestre; Pelage, Hatem, Négro, Abbassi, Bouaïfer	Stadium: Stade Lebon; Referee: Pénin

6 March 1938 12	AS Douéra	1–1	USM Blida	Douéra
	Monnier 70' Durval; Costa, Gener, Paris, Evernier, Testud, Monnier, Vivès, Oltra, Fouyssat, Roussel	Report	Pelage 80' Moréna; Laïd, Alègre; Mellal, Khelladi, Sylvestre; Pelage, Hatem, Négro, Bouaïfer, Feknous	Referee: Lévy

=== Play-off ===
==== Second Division title ====
Union Sportive Musulmane Blidéenne champion of group A against Stade Guyotville champion of group B

15 May 1938 play-off 1	Stade Guyotville (B)	1–2	USM Blida (A)	Maison Carré
16:00	Lopinto 30' Gahier, Madonado, Bellet, Llorens, Ochoa, Léoni, Marti, Georgetti, Lopinto, Ribès, Domenech	Report(1–0); Report	Oucifi as Négro Moréna; Laïd, Alègre; Mellal, Khelladi, Silvestre; Pelage, Hatem, Négro, Feknous, Bouaïfer	Stadium: Lavigerie

==== Promotion ====
22 May 1938 First leg	AS Dellys	0–0	USM Blida	Maison Carré
13:00		(0–0); Report		Referee: Winchell

29 May 1938 Second leg	USM Blida	4–0	AS Dellys	Rouïba
14:15	Hatem; Hami; Bouaïfer 40'; Hatem 80' Moréna; Laïd, Alègre; Mellal, Khelladi, Sylvestre; Pelage (c), Hatem, Négro, Bouaïfer, Hami	Report; Report (3–0)	Mazouz; Kraus, Cornéloc, Bréant, Kerlouche, Hamidouche, Zhoumi, Yahya, Zouaoui, Truchi, Trumbi	Referee: Attanasio

=== North African Cup ===
19 September 1937 1st Round	ES Zéralda	1–3	USM Blida	Boufarik
		Report	Oucifi as Négro; Hatem Moréna; Alègre, Houari; Mellal, Khelladi, Sylvestre; Zahout, Feknous, Négro, Hatem, Pelage (c)	Stadium: Stade Maréchal-Fosh; Referee: Riveccio

26 September 1937 2nd Round	US Ouest Mitidja	2–0	USM Blida	Saint Eugène
15:00	Chemin 80'; Berkani 85'	(0–0); Report	Moréna; Laïd, Nacer; Mellal, Khelladi, Sylvestre; Pelage (c), Négro, Bouaïfer, Hatem, Djebbouri	Stadium: Stade Banlieusard; Referee: Moussaoui

== League table ==
=== Group A ===
Pos	Team	Pld	W	D	L	F	A	GD	Pts	Notes
1	USM Blida	12	8	4	0	29	16	+13	32	
2	AS Douéra	12	9(2)	1	2	24	13	+11	31	
3	AS Trèfle-Algérois	12	9(1)	1	2	27	15	+12	31	
4	SC Médéa	12	4	2	6(2)	17	16	-1	22	
5	SCU El-Biar	12	2	2	8(2)	17	29	-12	20	
6	AS Lebon	12	2(1)	1	9	18	33	-15	17	
7	FC Kouba	12	1	1	10(3)	9	19	-10	15	

=== Playing statistics ===
Pos.	Name	Second Division												PO			NAC		Total
Pos.	Name	1	2	3	4	5	6	7	8	9	10	11	12	1	2	3	1	2	Total
GK	(Algeria) Moréna	X	X	X	X	X	X	X	X	X	X	X	X	X	X	X	X	X	17
DF	(Algeria) Laïd	X	X	X	X	X	X	X	X	X	X	X	X	X	X	X		X	16
DF	(France) (Spain) Alègre			X	X	X	X	X	X	X	X	X	X	X	X	X	X		14
DF	(Algeria) Nacer	X	X															X	3
DF	(Algeria) Houari																X		1
MF	(France) Sylvestre	X	X	X	X	X	X	X	X	X	X	X	X	X	X	X	X	X	17
MF	(Algeria) Khelladi	X	X	X	X	X	X	X	X	X	X	X	X	X	X	X	X	X	17
MF	(Algeria) Mellal	X	X	X	X	X	X	X		X	X	X	X	X	X	X	X	X	16
FW	(France) Pelage	X	X	X	X	X	X	X	X	X	X	X	X	X	X	X	X	X	17
FW	(Algeria) Hatem	X	X	X	X	X	X	X	X	X	X	X	X	X	X	X	X	X	17
FW	(Algeria) Oucifi	X	X	X	X	X	X	X	X	X	X	X	X	X	X	X	X	X	17
FW	(Algeria) Bouaïfer	X	X	X	X	X	X		X	X	X	X	X	X	X	X		X	15
FW	(Algeria) Djebbouri	X	X	X	X	X	X	X	X						X	X		X	11
FW	(Algeria) Abbassi							X	X	X	X	X							5
FW	(Algeria) Feknous												X	X			X		3
FW	(Algeria) Zahout																X		1

No.	Pos	Nat	Player	Total		Second Division		Play-off		North African Cup	
No.	Pos	Nat	Player	Apps	Goals	Apps	Goals	Apps	Goals	Apps	Goals
Goalkeepers
	GK	(Algeria) ALG	Mohamed Benmeida as Moréna (ex-USB)	17	1	12	1	3	-	2	-
Defenders
	DF	(Algeria) ALG	Laïd	16	0	12	-	3	-	1	-
	DF	(Spain) ESP	Émile Alègre (23/01/1913-21/03/2003)	15	0	11	-	3	-	1	-
	FW	(Algeria) ALG	Nacer	3	0	2	-	0	-	1	-
	DF	(Algeria) ALG	Ahmed Houari	1	0	-	-	-	-	1	-
Midfielders
	MF	(France) FRA	Jacques Sylvestre (22/02/1919-13/07/2014)	17	0	12	-	3	-	2	-
	FW	(Algeria) ALG	Ahmed Khelladi as Hadj (1913-1997)	17	0	12	-	3	-	2	-
	FW	(Algeria) ALG	Mohamed Mellal (1910-2007)	16	0	11	-	3	-	2	-
Forwards
	FW	(France) FRA	Jules Pelage (28/04/1914-08/02/1999)	17	5	12	5	3	-	2	-
	FW	(Algeria) ALG	Mohammed Hatem	17	8	12	5	3	2	2	1
	FW	(Algeria) ALG	Omar Oucifi as Négro	17	14	12	11	3	2	2	1
	FW	(Algeria) ALG	Abdelkader Bouaïfer	15	4	11	3	3	1	1	-
	FW	(Algeria) ALG	Mohamed Djebbouri as Hami (05/05/1913)	11	1	8	0	2	1	1	-
	FW	(Algeria) ALG	Mohamed Abbassi	5	0	5	-	-	-	-	-
	FW	(Algeria) ALG	Mohamed Feknous (ex-FCB)	3	0	1	-	1	-	1	-
	FW	(Algeria) ALG	Dahmane Zahout (Karadaniz)	1	0	-	-	-	-	1	-

=== Goalscorers ===
Player	Pos.	D1	PO	Cup	TOTAL
Omar Oucifi as Négro	FW	11	2	2	15
Hatem	MF	5	2	1	8
Pelage	FW	5	-		5
Bouaïfer	FW	3	1		4
Mohamed Moréna	GK	1	-		1
Mohamed Djebbouri as Hami	FW	0	1		1
Unknown		4	-	-	4
Totals		29	6	3	38
