= 1938–39 USM Blida season =

USM Blida
1938–39 season
- Chairman: Hamid Kassoul
- Stadium: FCB Stadium (actual Zoubir Zouraghi Stadium)
- First Division: 10th
- North African Cup: 2nd Round
Home colours

In the 1938–39 season, USM Blida is competing in the First Division for the 6th season French colonial era, as well as the Forconi Cup, and the North African Cup.

== Pre-season ==
| 4 September 1938 Friendly | USM Blida | 2–0 | US Blida | Blida |
| | | Report | | Referee: Félip |

== Competitions ==
=== Overview ===
| Competition | Record | | | | | | | |
| Competition | G | W | D | L | GF | GA | GD | Win % |
|---|---|---|---|---|---|---|---|---|
| First Division | 18 | 2 | 3 | 13 | 20 | 46 | −26 | 11.11 |
| Play-off | 3 | 1 | 1 | 1 | 1 | 0 | +1 | 33.33 |
| North African Cup | 2 | 1 | 0 | 1 | 6 | 4 | +2 | 50.00 |
| Total | 23 | 4 | 4 | 15 | 27 | 50 | −23 | 17.39 |

=== First Division ===
Win Draw Loss

| 9 October 1938 1 | RAS Algéroise | 3–1 | USM Blida | Ruisseau, Algiers |
| | | Report | Omar Oucif | Stadium: Stade Lebon |

| 16 October 1938 2 | USM Blida | 1–2 | O. Rouïba | Blida |
| | Omar Oucif | Report | | Referee: M. Graziani |

| 23 October 1938 3 | AST Alger | 0–2 | USM Blida | Fort-de-l'Eau |
| 14:55 | Tedrir, Crabos I, Crabos II, Clavaresa, Kheloui, Karassan, Dunerger, Kasdali, Dondina, Corsati, Miraglia | Report; Report | Omar Oucif; Kibylène Benmeida as Moréna; Hanini, Zane; Silvestre, Abderrezak Belabbas-Nabi, Mellal; Meridja, Kibylène, Houari, Khelladi, Djebbouri | Referee: M. Todori |

| 6 November 1938 4 | RC Maison-Carrée | 4–0 | USM Blida | Ruisseau, Algiers |
| | | Report | Moréna, Allègre, Hanini, Mellal, Yahiaoui, Silvestre, Djelfouni, Amenai, Bouchama, Pelage | Stadium: Stade Lebon; Referee: Riveccio |

| 13 November 1938 5 | USM Blida | 3–2 | Stade Algérois | Blida |
| | Pelage 40', 50'; Djebbouri 65'; Moréna, Laid, Allègre; Sylvestre, Kaddour Ahmed, Mellal, Djebbouri, Hadj, Houari, Kibylène, Pelage. | Report | Santiago | Stadium: Brakni Brothers Stadium; Referee: M. Jouve |

| 20 November 1938 6 | GS Orléansville | 0–0 | USM Blida | Orléansville |
| | | Report | Moréna, Laid, Allègre; Sylvestre, Kaddour Ahmed, Mellal, Djebbouri, Hadj, Houari, Kibylène, Pelage. |

| 4 December 1938 7 | USM Blida | 2–4 | AS Montpensier | Blida |
| | | Report |

| 11 December 1938 8 | USM Blida | 1–1 | US Fort-de-l'Eau | Blida |
| | | Report |

| 18 December 1938 9 | Stade Guyotville | 3–0 | USM Blida | Guyotville |
| | | Report |

| 8 January 1939 10 | USM Blida | 2–3 | RAS Algéroise | Blida |
| | | Report |

| 15 January 1939 11 | O. Rouïba | 6–1 | USM Blida | Fort-de-l'Eau |
| | | Report |

| 29 January 1939 12 | USM Blida | 1–1 | AST Alger | Blida |
| | Mohamedi | Report |

| 12 February 1939 13 | USM Blida | 0–3 | RC Maison-Carrée | Blida |
| | | Report |

| 26 February 1939 14 | Stade Algérois | 4–3 | USM Blida | Algiers |
| | | Report |

| 12 March 1939 15 | USM Blida | 0–1 | GS Orléansville | Blida |
| | | Report |

| 26 March 1939 16 | AS Montpensier | 3–0 | USM Blida | El Biar |
| | | Report |

| 16 April 1939 17 | US Fort-de-l'Eau | 4–2 | USM Blida | Fort-de-l'Eau |
| | | Report |

| 23 April 1939 18 | USM Blida | 1–2 | Stade Guyotville | Blida |
| | ? | Report | Domenech; Roman |

=== Play-off ===
| 7 May 1939 play-off 1 | USM Blida | 1–0 | J.S.I.Issers | Fort-de-l'Eau |
| 15:00 | Ben Alfa 78' | Report | | Referee: M. Amar |

| 14 May 1939 play-off 2 | USM Blida | w/o | J.S.I.Issers | Maison Carré |
| 15:00 | | Report | | Referee: M. Ripoll, juge (Parienté) |
Note: Kybilène non qualifié

| 28 May 1939 play-off 3 | USM Blida | 0–0 | J.S.I.Issers | Maison Carré |
| 14:00 | | Report; Report |

=== North African Cup ===
| 11 September 1938 1st Round | C.A. Paté | 0–5 | USM Blida | Boufarik |
| | | Report | Omar Oucif as Nagro Moréna; Kaddour Ahmed, Allègre; Sylvestre, Khelladi, Mellal; Pelage, Hatem, Négro, Bébicha, Djebbouri as Hami | Referee: Attanasio |

| 18 September 1938 2nd Round | Olympique de Tizi-Ouzou | 4–1 | USM Blida | Ménerville |
| 14:45 | | Report | Omar Oucif as Nagro 32' Moréna; Kaddour Ahmed, Allègre; Sylvestre, Khelladi, Mellal; Pelage, Hatem, Négro, Bébicha, Bouaifer | Referee: Weinchell (Biton-Caratino) |

== League table ==
=== Group A ===
| Pos | Team | Pld | W | D | L | F | A | GD | Pts | Notes |
|---|---|---|---|---|---|---|---|---|---|---|
| 1 | GS Orléansville | 18 | | | | | | | 44 | |
| 2 | RC Maison-Carrée | 18 | | | | | | | 44 | |
| 3 | Olympique de Rouïba | 18 | | | | | | | 41 | |
| 4 | AS Montpensier | 18 | | | | | | | 40 | |
| 5 | US Fort-de-l'Eau | 18 | | | | | | | 36 | |
| 6 | Stade Guyotville | 18 | | | | | | | 35 | |
| 7 | RAS Algéroise | 18 | | | | | | | 35 | |
| 8 | AST Alger | 18 | | | | | | | 31 | |
| 9 | Stade Algérois | 18 | | | | | | | 29 | |
| 10 | USM Blida | 18 | 2 | 3 | 13 | 20 | 46 | -26 | 25 | |

=== Results summary ===
| Overall | | | | | | | | Home | | | | | | Away | | | | | |
| Pld | W | D | L | GF | GA | GD | Pts | W | D | L | GF | GA | GD | W | D | L | GF | GA | GD |
|---|---|---|---|---|---|---|---|---|---|---|---|---|---|---|---|---|---|---|---|
| 18 | 2 | 3 | 13 | 20 | 46 | −26 | 9 | 1 | 2 | 6 | 11 | 19 | −8 | 1 | 1 | 7 | 9 | 27 | −18 |

Last updated: May 1939.
Source: Competitive matches

=== Results by round ===
| Round | 1 | 2 | 3 | 4 | 5 | 6 | 7 | 8 | 9 | 10 | 11 | 12 | 13 | 14 | 15 | 16 | 17 | 18 |
|---|---|---|---|---|---|---|---|---|---|---|---|---|---|---|---|---|---|---|
| Ground | A | H | A | A | H | A | H | H | A | H | A | H | H | A | H | A | A | H |
| Result | L | L | W | L | W | D | L | D | L | L | L | D | L | L | L | L | L | L |
| Position | 9 | 10 | 6 | 9 | 6 | 6 | 7 | 7 | 10 | 10 | 10 | 9 | 10 | 10 | 10 | 10 | 10 | 10 |

Updated to match(es) played on 14 May 1939. Source: Competitive matches
A = Away; H = Home; W = Win; D = Draw; L = Loss

== Squad statistics ==
- GK: Benmeida Mohamed as Moréna
- DF: Ripoll, Allègre, El Aid, Ali Mansouri as Ali Doudou (ASB), Farès Mohamed
- MF: Mellal Mohamed, Khelladi Ahmed, Chekaimi Ali (FCB), Sylvestre
- FW: Benelfoul Mohamed (ASB), Ardjem Kaddour (ASB), Omar Oucifi as Négro, Hatem Mohamed, Benelfoul Ahmed + Hamidouche Ali
