= 1945–46 USM Blida season =

USM Blida
1945–46 season
- President: Hamid Kassoul
- Stadium: FCB Stadium
- Division Honneur: 9th
- Forconi Cup: 2nd Round
- Top goalscorer: League: Abderrahmane Hatem (5); All: Abderrahmane Hatem (5)
Home colours

In the 1945–46 season, USM Blida is competing in the Division Honneur for the 14th season French colonial era, as well as the Forconi Cup. They will be competing in Division Honneur, and the North African Cup.

== Pre-season ==
Win Draw Loss

| 9 September 1945 | MC Alger | 3–1 | USM Blida | Algiers |
| | Saib Ali dit Said Said (pen.); Bouhraoua | Report | Bensamet | Stadium: Municipal; Referee: Moussaoui |
Note: Tournament Aïd el-Seghir

| 5 May 1946 friendly | Olympique d'Hussein Dey | 1–1 | USM Blida | Saint Eugène |
| | | Report | Bernou (2nd half-time) | Stadium: Saint Eugène |

== Competitions ==
=== Overview ===
| Competition | Record | | | | | | | |
| Competition | G | W | D | L | GF | GA | GD | Win % |
|---|---|---|---|---|---|---|---|---|
| Division Honneur | 20 | 6 | 5 | 9 | 23 | 28 | −5 | 30.00 |
| Forconi Cup | 1 | 0 | 0 | 1 | 1 | 2 | −1 | 0.00 |
| Total | 21 | 6 | 5 | 10 | 24 | 30 | −6 | 28.57 |

== Division Honneur ==
=== League table ===
| Pos | Team | Pld | W | D | L | GF | GA | GD | Pts | Relegation |
|---|---|---|---|---|---|---|---|---|---|---|
| 1 | RU Alger | 20 | 12 | 5 | 3 | 34 | 12 | +22 | 49 | Champion |
| 2 | AS Saint Eugène | 20 | 10 | 5 | 5 | 34 | 22 | +12 | 45 | |
| 3 | FC Blida | 20 | 12 | 1 | 7 | 28 | 20 | +8 | 45 | |
| 4 | RS Alger | 20 | 11 | 1 | 8 | 32 | 28 | +4 | 43 | |
| 5 | GS Alger | 20 | 8 | 5 | 7 | 24 | 13 | +11 | 41 | |
| 6 | MC Alger | 20 | 8 | 5 | 7 | 30 | 29 | +1 | 41 | |
| 7 | AS Boufarik | 20 | 9 | 2 | 9 | 32 | 27 | +5 | 40 | |
| 8 | US Blida | 20 | 5 | 10 | 5 | 27 | 32 | −5 | 40 | |
| 9 | USM Blida | 20 | 6 | 5 | 9 | 25 | 29 | −4 | 37 | Relegated |
| 10 | O Hussein Dey | 20 | 3 | 4 | 13 | 11 | 36 | −25 | 30 | Relegated |
| 11 | US Ouest Mitidja | 20 | 2 | 5 | 13 | 11 | 35 | −24 | 29 | Relegated |

Source: Sport-Afric

=== Matches ===
Win Draw Loss

| 30 September 1945 Round 1 | US Blida | 2–2 | USM Blida | Blida |
| | Ferfera; Martinez Salord, Pérals, Martinez I, Jean, Cortès, Zahzah, Hamouda, Yahia, Martinez II, Bourelle, Ferfera | Report | Khelladi; Djoudad Menacer, Bouguerra II, Mansouri, Chekaimi, Bob, Bouguerra I, Benelfoul, Khelladi, Djoudad, Hatem, Bensamet | Stadium: USB; Referee: Todori |

| 14 October 1945 Round 2 | US Ouest Mitidja | 0–7 | USM Blida | El Affroun |
| | Lugutte, Desnet, Yung, Boccheciamp, Jagonès, Araouit, Larenzo, Lecaille, Gaillard, Vedudi, Sahraoui | Report | Hatem; Imcaoudène as Bob Menacer, Bouguerra II, Mansouri, Zidoun, Bob, Bouguerra I, Bensamet, Benelfoul, Djoudad, Hatem, Bernou |

| 28 October 1945 Round 3 | RU Alger | 2–0 | USM Blida | Algiers |
| | Thomas 70'; Brouillet 78' Dambrun, Ferrari, Liévin, Hamraoui, Vidal, Boubekeur, Vivès, Poizat, illoul, Brouillet, Thomas | Report | Menacer, Bouguerra II, Mansouri, Chekaimi, Zidoun, Bouguerra I, Benelfoul, Bensamet, Djoudad, Bob, Hatem | Referee: Attanasio |

| 11 November 1945 Round 4 | AS Boufarik | 5–2 | USM Blida | Boufarik |
| | Reichert; Alvado; Vicedo; Samouilhan Bataillon, Massip, Cortès, Hamidouche, Vicédo, Robert, Ruiz, Alvado, Reichert, Gotvallès, Samouilhan | Report | Benelfoul; Djoudad Menacer, Mansouri, Zerrouki, Bernou, Bouguerra I, Zidoun, Benelfoul, Bensamet, Djoudad, Bob, Medjbar |

| 18 November 1945 Round 5 | RS Alger | 0–2 | USM Blida | Algiers |
| | Bouquet, Domenech, Giganti, Senane, Zerapha, Botella, Buffard, Falandry, Poncetti, Ghanem, Hahad | Report | Bernou 10'; Hatem 45' Menacer, Zerrouki, Mansouri, Bouguerra II, Bob, Medjbar, Benelfoul, Bensamet, Bernou, Hatem, Benazout | Referee: Delpeuch |

| 25 November 1945 Round 6 | USM Blida | 2–0 | O Hussein Dey | Blida |
| | Benelfoul 20'; Bensamet 75' Menacer, Mansouri, Bouguerra II, Bob, Bouguerra I, Benelfoul, Bernou, Bensamet, Kourane, Benazout | Report | Salord, Cantino, Mouzarine, Santiago, Tallis, Bouzidi, Sanchez, Bentifour II, Bentifour I, Juanico, Gonzalvès | Stadium: Brakni Brothers Stadium |

| 9 December 1945 Round 7 | FC Blida | w/o | USM Blida | Blida |
| | Rodriguez 61', 77' Libérati, Giner, Bachelu, Haddad, Pons, Seillès, Samary, Large, Rodriguez, Haddadi, Bocchechiampe (suspended) | Report | Meradi, Mansouri, Bouguerra II, Zamouchi, Chekaimi, Bouguerra I, Benelfoul, Bernou, Hatem, Bendjiar | Referee: M. Attanasio |
Note: Changed into win for USM Blida (originally 2-0), Match lost for FCB For having teammate Bocchechiampe play against USMB, who had signed two Licenses (one for FCB and one for USOM), FCB lost the match he had won in the field. Boccheciampe was suspended for six months.

| 16 December 1945 Round 8 | MC Alger | 1–1 | USM Blida | Algiers |
| | Saib Ali dit Said Said 89' Abtouche, Abdoun, Khabatou, Achour, Abdelaoui, Tadjet, Missoum, Saib, Bouaroua, Hadad, Arribi | Report | 48' Bouguerra I Meradi, Bouguerra II, Chekaimi, Mansouri, Bob, Zamouchi, Benelfoul, Hatem, Bernou, Bensamet, Bouguerra I |

| 6 January 1946 Round 9 | USM Blida | 1–0 | GS Alger | Blida |
| | El Hadj Khelladi 15' Meradi, Bouguerra II, Mansouri, Chekaimi, Kourane, Benelfoul, Bensamet, Bernou, Khelladi, Bouguerra I | Report | Testa, Vitiello S, Fortuné, Bénéja, Lopresti, Calmus II, Mazoyer, Mercadal L, Belmonte, Vitiello G, Paone |

| 20 January 1946 Round 10 | AS Saint Eugène | 4–0 | USM Blida | Saint Eugène |
| | Castaldi 46', 68'; Gomez 87'; Benet 90' Izzo, Stéphanof, Néron, Mengual, Leber, Bel Hadj, Castaldi, Guittoun, Benet, de Villeneuve, Gomez | Report | Meradi, Bouguerra II, Mansouri, Chekaimi, Bob, Zamouchi, Bensamet, Benelfoul, Khelladi, Bernou, Medjbar | Referee: Roméro |

| 27 January 1946 Round 11 | USM Blida | 2–2 | US Blida | Blida |
| | Bernou ou Bensamed; Benelfoul ou Bernou Meradi, Bouguerra II, Mansouri, Bensamet, Bob, Bernou, Zidoun, Bouguerra I, Benelfoul, Benazout | Report | Cortès; Yahia 65' Salord, Perals, Martinez, Gamouda, Sasse, Zaza, Yahia, Bocchéciampe, Mahieddine, Cortès, Gambier |

| 3 February 1946 Round 12 | USM Blida | 0–0 | US Ouest Mitidja | Blida |
| | Meradi, Mansouri, Bouguerra II, Zerrouki, Hatem, Benelfoul, Bensamet, Bernou, Benazout, Zidoun, Bouguerra I | Report | Manchon, Yung, Rouquier, Moll, Hasni, Berkani, Kaddour, Corsat, Defnet, Gaillard, Macia |

| 17 February 1946 Round 13 | USM Blida | 0–0 | RU Alger | Blida |
| | Menacer, Bouguerra II, Mansouri, Chekaimi, Bob, Bensamet, Bernou, Bouguerra I, Benelfoul, Hatem, Djoudad | 1; 2 | Dambrun, Ferrari, Lévin, Ribès, Couvret, Poizat, Vidal, Brouillet, Illoul, Faglin, Chérif |

| 24 February 1946 Round 14 | USM Blida | 2–3 | AS Boufarik | Blida |
| | Vicédo ?' (o.g.); Bensamet Menacer, Bouguerra II, Mansouri, Chekaimi, Bob, Zidoun, Benelfoul, Bensamet, Djoudad, Hatem, Bernou | Report | Ruiz; Yacoubi Eataillou, Cortès, Vicédo, Hamidouche, Lloret, Reicher, Yacoubi (Vidal), Ruiz, Hervieu, Alvado, Samouilhan |

| 3 March 1946 Round 15 | USM Blida | 0–1 | RS Alger | Blida |
| | Menacer, Mansouri, Bouguerra II, Chekaimi, Bob, Zidoun, Bensamet, Benelfoul, Bernou, Hatem, Bouguerra I | Report | 85' Buffard Bouquet, Quessada, Pérez, Giganti, Zerapha, Saâdi, Buffard, Zaibek, Poncetti, Ghanem, Gilabert |

| 10 March 1946 Round 16 | O Hussein Dey | 0–1 | USM Blida | Saint Eugène |
| 16:00 | Kaoua, Mouzarine, Bouzidi - Camps, Tallis, Fiol - Sanchez, Portella, Fez, Ouzifi, Gonzalvès | 1; 2 | Bensamet Menacer, Bouguerra II, Mansouri - Zidoun, Bob, Bouguerra I - Benelfoul, Bernou, Bensamet, Hatem, Benazout |

| 17 March 1946 Round 17 | USM Blida | 0–1 | FC Blida | Blida |
| 16:15 | Menacer, Bouguerra II, Mansouri, Zidoun, Bob, Bouguerra I, Benelfoul, Benazout, Bernou, Hatem, Bensamet | 1; 2 | 42' Rodriguez Sielvo, Arnould, Bachelu, Abed, Pons, Samary Y, Addadi, Noguès, Rodriguez, Fuster, Auber |

| 24 March 1946 Round 18 | USM Blida | 1–3 | MC Alger | Blida |
| 16:30 | Bensamet 89' Menacer, Mansouri, Bouguerra II; Zidoun, Bob, Bouguerra I; Benelfoul, Fredj, Bensamet, Benazout, Bernou | Report | Saib; Tadjet; 80' Saib Abtouche, Abdoun, Khabatou; Tadjet, Abdelaoui, Souissi; Missoum, Saib, Bouraoua, Hadad, Aribi |

| 31 March 1946 Round 19 | GS Alger | 2–0 | USM Blida | Algiers |
| 16:30 | Vitiello Gaeten 5'; Mercadal 40' Testa, Lopresti, Fortuné, Vitiello S., Belmonte, Calmus, Armand V., Florentino, Calmus Roger, Mercadal, Vitiello G., Biton | Report; Report | Menacer, Hili, Mansouri, Bensamet, Bob, Zamouchi, Bernou, Benelfoul, Boudjema, Hatem, Bouguerra I | Referee: Caratino |

| 28 April 1946 Round 20 | USM Blida | 0–1 | AS Saint Eugène | Blida |
| | Menacer, Mansouri, Hili, Benazout, Bob, Zidoun, Benelfoul, Bensamet, Djoudad, Hatem, Bernou | Report; Report | Benet 3' Izzo, Mengual, Belhadj, Oliver, Stepanof, Ferrat, Castaldi, Sconamiglio, Benet, Guittoun, de Villeneuve |

=== Play-off ===
| 12 May 1946 Play-off | GS Orléansville | 1–1 | USM Blida | Saint Eugène |
| 17:30 | Canto 60' Pesch, Houari, Yahi; BouKhelifat, Messaoui, Mentessuit; Houari, Aubert, Canto, Nasri, Ould Larbi | Report | Djoudad 42' Menacer, Bouguerra, Mansouri; Bensamet, Bob, Zidoun; Benelfoul, Saib, Djoudad, Hatem, Bernou |

== Forconi Cup ==
| 7 October 1945 2nd Round | Stade Guyotville | 2–1 | USM Blida | Castiglione |
| 13:30 | | Report |

== Players statistics ==
| No. | Pos | Nat | Player | Total | | Division Honneur | | Play-off | | Forconi Cup | |
| No. | Pos | Nat | Player | Apps | Goals | Apps | Goals | Apps | Goals | Apps | Goals |
Goalkeepers
| | GK | (Algeria) ALG | Abderrahmane Menacer | 15 | 0 | 14 | - | 1 | - | - | - |
| | GK | (Algeria) ALG | Abdelaziz Meradi | 6 | 0 | 6 | - | - | - | - | - |
Defenders
| | DF | (Algeria) ALG | Ali Mansouri | 21 | 0 | 20 | - | 1 | - | - | - |
| | DF | (Algeria) ALG | Belkacem Bouguerra II | 18 | 0 | 17 | - | 1 | - | - | - |
| | DF | (Algeria) ALG | Abdelaziz Chekaimi | 9 | 0 | 9 | - | - | - | - | - |
| | DF | (Algeria) ALG | Rabah Zerrouki | 3 | 0 | 3 | - | - | - | - | - |
| | DF | (Algeria) ALG | Kamel Hili | 2 | 0 | 2 | - | - | - | - | - |
Midfielders
| | MF | (Algeria) ALG | Kaddour Bensamet | 20 | 4 | 19 | 4 | 1 | - | - | - |
| | MF | (Algeria) ALG | Ahmed Bernou | 19 | 1 | 18 | 1 | 1 | - | - | - |
| | MF | (Algeria) ALG | Mohamed Imcaoudène as Bob | 18 | 3 | 17 | 3 | 1 | - | - | - |
| | MF | (Algeria) ALG | Boualem Zidoun | 12 | 0 | 11 | - | 1 | - | - | - |
| | MF | (Algeria) ALG | Zamouchi | 4 | 0 | 4 | - | - | - | - | - |
| | MF | (Algeria) ALG | Abdelkader Kourane | 2 | 0 | 2 | - | - | - | - | - |
| | MF | (Algeria) ALG | Ali Boudjema | 1 | 0 | 1 | - | - | - | - | - |
Forwards
| | FW | (Algeria) ALG | Ahmed Benelfoul (c) | 21 | 3 | 20 | 3 | 1 | - | - | - |
| | FW | (Algeria) ALG | Bouguerra I | 16 | 2 | 16 | 2 | - | - | - | - |
| | FW | (Algeria) ALG | Abderrahmane Hatem | 15 | 6 | 14 | 6 | 1 | - | - | - |
| | FW | (Algeria) ALG | Benazout | 8 | 0 | 8 | - | - | - | - | - |
| | FW | (Algeria) ALG | Abdelkader Djoudad I | 8 | 3 | 7 | 2 | 1 | 1 | - | - |
| | FW | (Algeria) ALG | El Hadj Khelladi | 3 | 1 | 3 | 1 | - | - | - | - |
| | FW | (Algeria) ALG | Medjbar | 3 | 0 | 3 | - | - | - | - | - |
| | FW | (Algeria) ALG | Mustapha Bendjiar | 1 | 0 | 1 | - | - | - | - | - |
| | FW | (Algeria) ALG | Fredj | 1 | 0 | 1 | - | - | - | - | - |
| | FW | (Algeria) ALG | Ali Saib | 1 | 0 | 0 | - | 1 | - | - | - |

=== Playing statistics ===
| Pos. | Name | Division Honneur | | | | | | | | | | | | | | | | | | | | FC | PO | Total |
| Pos. | Name | 1 | 2 | 3 | 4 | 5 | 6 | 7 | 8 | 9 | 10 | 11 | 12 | 13 | 14 | 15 | 16 | 17 | 18 | 19 | 20 | 1 | 1 | Total |
|---|---|---|---|---|---|---|---|---|---|---|---|---|---|---|---|---|---|---|---|---|---|---|---|---|
| GK | Menacer | X | X | X | X | X | X | | | | | | | X | X | X | X | X | X | X | X | X | | 15 |
| GK | Meradi | | | | | | | X | X | X | X | X | X | | | | | | | | | | | 6 |
| DF | Mansouri | X | X | X | X | X | X | X | X | X | X | X | X | X | X | X | X | X | X | X | X | X | | 21 |
| DF | Bouguerra II | X | X | X | | X | X | X | X | X | X | X | X | X | X | X | X | X | X | | | X | | 18 |
| DF | Chekaimi | X | | X | | | | X | X | X | X | | | X | X | X | | | | | | | | 9 |
| DF | Zerrouki | | | | X | X | | | | | | | X | | | | | | | | | | | 3 |
| DF | Hili | | | | | | | | | | | | | | | | | | | X | X | | | 2 |
| MF | Bensamet | X | X | X | X | X | X | | X | X | X | X | X | X | X | X | X | X | X | X | X | X | | 20 |
| MF | Bernou | | X | | X | X | X | X | X | X | X | X | X | X | X | X | X | X | X | X | X | X | | 19 |
| MF | Imcaoudène | X | X | X | X | X | X | | X | | X | X | | X | X | X | X | X | X | X | X | X | | 18 |
| MF | Zidoun | | X | X | X | | | | | | | X | X | | X | X | X | X | X | | X | X | | 12 |
| MF | Zamouchi | | | | | | | X | X | | X | | | | | | | | | X | | | | 4 |
| MF | Boudjema | | | | | | | | | | | | | | | | | | | X | | | | 2 |
| MF | Kourane | | | | | | X | | | X | | | | | | | | | | | | | | 2 |
| FW | Benelfoul | X | X | X | X | X | X | X | X | X | X | X | X | X | X | X | X | X | X | X | X | X | | 21 |
| FW | Bouguerra I | X | X | X | X | | X | X | X | X | | X | X | X | | X | X | X | X | X | | | | 15 |
| FW | Hatem | X | X | X | | X | | X | X | | | | X | X | X | X | X | X | | X | X | X | | 15 |
| FW | Benazout | | | | | X | X | | | | | X | X | | | | X | X | X | | X | | | 8 |
| FW | Djoudad I | X | X | X | X | | | | | | | | | X | X | | | | | | X | X | | 8 |
| FW | Khelladi | X | | | | | | | | X | X | | | | | | | | | | | | | 3 |
| FW | Medjbar | | | | X | X | | | | | X | | | | | | | | | | | | | 3 |
| FW | Bendjiar | | | | | | | X | | | | | | | | | | | | | | | | 1 |
| FW | Saib | | | | | | | | | | | | | | | | | | | | | X | | 1 |
| FW | Fredj | | | | | | | | | | | | | | | | | X | | | | | | 1 |

=== Goalscorers ===
| Player | Pos. | D1 | PO | Cup | TOTAL |
|---|---|---|---|---|---|
| Abderrahmane Hatem | FW | 5 | - | | 5 |
| Kaddour Bensamet | MF | 4 | - | | 4 |
| Mohamed Imcaoudène as Bob | FW | 3 | - | | 3 |
| Ahmed Benelfoul | FW | 4 | - | | 4 |
| Abdelkader Djoudad | FW | 2 | 1 | | 3 |
| Bouguerra I | FW | 2 | - | | 2 |
| Ahmed Bernou | FW | 1 | - | | 1 |
| El Hadj Khelladi | FW | 1 | - | | 1 |
| Own Goals | | 1 | - | - | 1 |
| Totals | | 23 | 1 | 1 | 25 |
