= 1941–42 USM Blida season =

USM Blida
1941–42 season
- President: Hamid Kassoul
- Stadium: FCB Stadium
- First Division: 1st
- Algiers Cup: 4th Round
Home colours

In the 1941–42 season, USM Blida is competing in the First Division for the 8th season French colonial era, as well as the Forconi Cup. They will be competing in First Division, and the Algiers Cup.

== Non-competitive ==
=== Friendly ===
Win Draw Loss

29 December 1941 Semi-finals	JS Djijel	0–1	USM Blida	Algiers
14:15				Stadium: Municipal
Note: Tournament Aïd El-Kebir

29 December 1941 Final	MC Alger	0–1	USM Blida	Algiers
16:30		Report		Stadium: Municipal
Note: Tournament Aïd El-Kebir

== Competitions ==
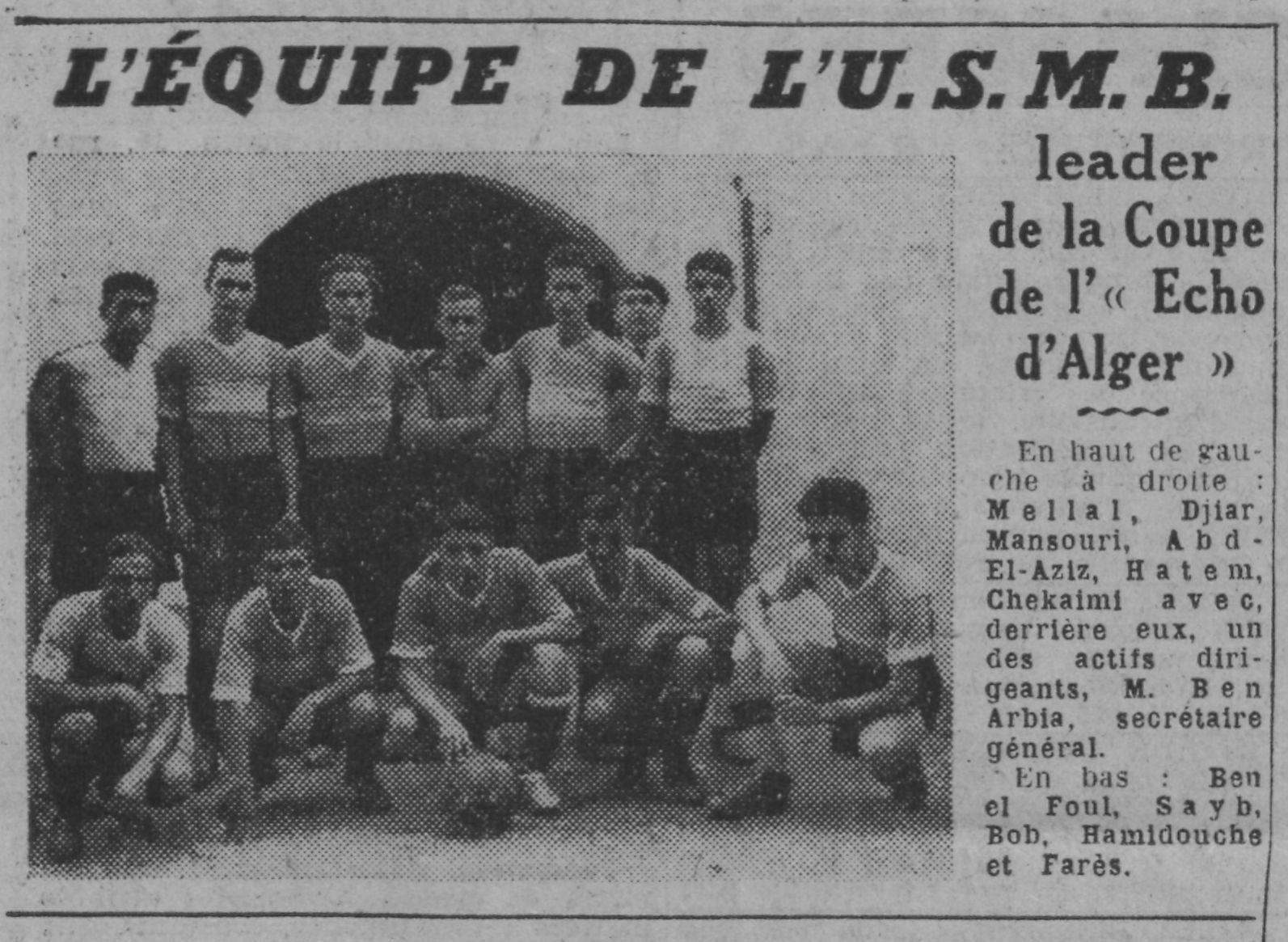
USM Blida's team during season 1941–42 with From Left to Right: Stand Up : Mohamed Mellal, Mustapha Bendjiar, Ali Mansouri, Abdelaziz Meradi, Dahmane Hatem, Abdelaziz Chekaimi with behind them, M. Belkacem Benarbia secretary general. Sitting: Ahmed Benelfoul, Ali Saïb, Mohamed Imcaoudène as Bob, Ali Hamidouche and Mohamed Farès

=== Overview ===
Competition	Record							
Competition	G	W	D	L	GF	GA	GD	Win %
First Division	18	15	3	0	47	11	+36	83.33
Algiers Cup	3	2	0	1	4	3	+1	66.67
Total	21	17	3	1	51	14	+37	80.95

=== League table ===
Pos	Team	Pld	W	D	L	F	A	GD	Pts	Notes
1	USM Blida	18	15	3	0	47	11	+35	52	
2	S. Guyotville	13							29	
3	US Fort-de-l'Eau	13							28	
4	Olympique Marengo	12							26	
5	Olympique O Tizi-Ouzou	11							25	
6	Olympique de Rouïba	12							21	
7	AS Montpensier	12							21	
8	RAS Algéroise	13							20	
9	AST Alger	13							19	
10	Stade Algérois	12							18	

=== Results summary ===
Overall								Home						Away					
Pld	W	D	L	GF	GA	GD	Pts	W	D	L	GF	GA	GD	W	D	L	GF	GA	GD
18	15	3	0	46	11	+35	48	8	1	0	31	9	+22	7	2	0	15	2	+13

Last updated: 5 April 2020.
Source: Competitive matches

=== Results by round ===
Round	1	2	3	4	5	6	7	8	9	10	11	12	13	14	15	16	17	18
Ground	A	H	A	H	H	A	H	H	A	H	A	H	A	A	H	A	A	H
Result	W	W	W	W	W	W	D	W	W	W	W	W	D	W	W	W	W	W
Position	1	1	1	1	1	1	1	1	1	1	1	1	1	1	1	1	1	1

Updated to match(es) played on May 1942. Source: Competitive matches
A = Away; H = Home; W = Win; D = Draw; L = Loss

=== Matches ===
Win Draw Loss

28 September 1941 1	RAS Algéroise	0–2	USM Blida	Fort-de-l'Eau
		Report	El Hadj Khelladi; Dahmane

12 October 1941 2	USM Blida	4–0	O Rouïba	Blida
		Report

19 October 1941 3	AST Alger	0–3	USM Blida	Fort-de-l'Eau
		Report

2 November 1941 4	USM Blida	2–0	Olympique Marengo	Blida
		Report

23 November 1941 5	USM Blida	6–0	Stade Algérois	Blida
		Report

7 December 1941 6	O Tizi-Ouzou	0–2	USM Blida	Tizi Ouzou
		Report

14 December 1941 7	USM Blida	v	AS Montpensier	Blida

21 December 1941 8	USM Blida	2–1	US Fort-de-l'Eau	Blida
		Report

28 December 1941 9	Stade Guyotville	0–2	USM Blida	Guyotville
		Report

4 January 1942 10	USM Blida	4–1	RAS Algéroise	Blida
		Report

11 January 1942 11	O Rouïba	0–1	USM Blida	Rouïba
		Report

18 January 1942 12	USM Blida	4–2	AST Alger	Blida
		Report

8 February 1942 13	Olympique Marengo	2–2	USM Blida	Marengo
		Report

15 February 1942 14	Stade Algérois	0–0	USM Blida	Baïnem
		Report

1 March 1942 15	USM Blida	2–1	O Tizi-Ouzou	Blida
	Mustapha Bendjiar 5'; Hatem 75' Meradi, Farès, Mansouri; Imcaoudène, Khelladi, Benelfoul, Hatem, Mustapha...	Report	Arrondeau 80'	Stadium: Brakni Brothers Stadium; Referee: Penin

15 March 1942 16	AS Montpensier	0–2	USM Blida	Fort-de-l'Eau
		Report

29 March 1942 17	US Fort-de-l'Eau	0–2	USM Blida	Fort-de-l'Eau
		Report

19 April 1942 18	USM Blida	5–2	Stade Guyotville	Blida
		Report

10 May 1942 7	USM Blida	2–2	AS Montpensier	Boufarik
		Report

== Algiers Cup ==
5 October 1941 2nd Round	USM Blida	2–0	USM Maison-Carré	Kouba
14:00		Report

26 October 1941 3rd Round	USM Blida	2–1	FC Blida	Blida
14:00	? 44'; Hatem 75' Meradi, Farès, Mansouri, Chekaimi, Bob, Mellal, Benelfoul, Khelladi, Bendjiar, Hamidouche, Hatem	Report	Fuster Libérati, Labattut, Pons, Zamouchi, Pons, Gener, Carasco, Soria II, Levèque, Fuster, Soria I	Stadium: USB Stadium; Referee: M. Winchell

30 November 1941 4th Round	RS Alger	2–0	USM Blida	Algiers
14:00	Buffard Grima, Raingeard, Giganti, Hamdoune, Yamarène, Zaibek, Buffard, Ponceti, Zouaoui, Ribès, Gulbenbrian	Report	Meradi, Mansouri, Farès, Mellal, Bob, Chekaimi, Benelfoul, Said, Bendjiar, Hamidouche, Hatem	Stadium: Municipal; Referee: M. Winchell

== Players statistics ==

USM Blida 1941–42

No.	Pos	Nat	Player	Total		First Division		Forconi Cup	
No.	Pos	Nat	Player	Apps	Goals	Apps	Goals	Apps	Goals
Goalkeepers
	GK	(Algeria) ALG	Abdelaziz Meradi (Ex-FCB)	-2	0	-	-	2	0
Defenders
	DF	(Algeria) ALG	Ali Mansouri (Ex-ASB)	2	0	0	-	2	0
	DF	(Algeria) ALG	Mohamed Farès (Ex-ASB)	2	0	0	-	2	0
Midfielders
	MF	(Algeria) ALG	Mohamed Mellal	2	0	0	-	2	0
	AM	(Algeria) ALG	Mohamed Imcaoudène as Bob (Ex-FCB)	2	0	0	-	2	0
	MF	(Algeria) ALG	Abdelaziz Chekaimi (Ex-FCB)	2	0	0	-	2	0
Forwards
	FW	(Algeria) ALG	Ahmed Benelfoul (Ex-ASB)	2	0	0	-	2	0
	FW	(Algeria) ALG	Ali Saïb as Saïd Saïd (Ex-ASB)	1	0	0	-	1	0
	FW	(Algeria) ALG	Ahmed Khelladi as El Hadj	1	0	0	-	1	0
	FW	(Algeria) ALG	Mustapha Bendjiar	2	0	0	-	2	0
	FW	(Algeria) ALG	Ali Hamidouche (Ex-ASB)	2	0	0	-	2	0
	FW	(Algeria) ALG	Abderrahmane Hatem	2	0	0	-	2	0
