= 1947–48 USM Blida season =

USM Blida
1947–48 season
- President: Hamid Kassoul
- Head coach: Belkacem Bouguerra
- Stadium: FCB Stadium
- Division Honneur: 8th
- Forconi Cup: Fourth Round
Home colours

In the 1947–48 season, USM Blida competed in the Division Honneur for the 15th season French colonial era, as well as the Forconi Cup. They competed in Division Honneur, and the North African Cup.

== Pre-season ==
Win Draw Loss

31 August 1947	USM Blida	3–3	AS Saint Eugène	Algiers
	Youssari; Bob; Bensamet Menacer, Benazout, Youssari, Bob, Zerrouki, Zouraghi, Laidi, Bensamet, Bernou, Bouchekeur, Hatem	Report	Bendinelli; Mazella; Pons Kaoua, Yousfi, Mengual, Aboulker, Oliver, Stepanoff, Vidal, Benet, Bendinelli, Ferigno, Mazella, Rivas, Benejean, Pons	Stadium: Saint Eugène; Referee: Garofalo, Juann
Note: Friendly

11 November 1947	MC Alger	1–0	USM Blida	Algiers
	Abdelaoui 80' Abtouche, Khabatou, Hamoutène, Kouar, Hanoune, Abdelaoui, Hahad, Bennour (Akliouat Hamid as Hamid II), Messat, Deguigui (Souissi), Benhamou Hamid	Report	Menacer (Meradi), Mansouri, Bouguerra, Zouraghi, Mohamed Imcaoudène as Bob, Zahzah, Hatem, Bernou, Belkhouba, Bensamet, Benelfoul	Stadium: Saint Eugène; Referee: Farrel
Note: Tournament Saint Eugène

24 November 1947	USM Blida	1–0	Olympique de Médéa	Blida
	Khelifa (assist: Mahieddine)	Report		Stadium: FCB Stadium
Note: Tournament (Achoura)

24 November 1947	USM Blida	3–0	SCM Blida	Blida
		Report		Stadium: FCB Stadium
Note: Tournament (Achoura)

18 February 1948	USM Blida	3–3	AS Orléansville	Chlef
		Report
Note: friendly

== Competitions ==
=== Overview ===
Competition	Record							
Competition	G	W	D	L	GF	GA	GD	Win %
Division Honneur	22	6	5	11	19	30	−11	27.27
Forconi Cup	1	0	0	1	0	1	−1	0.00
Total	23	6	5	12	19	31	−12	26.09

== Division Honneur ==
=== League table ===
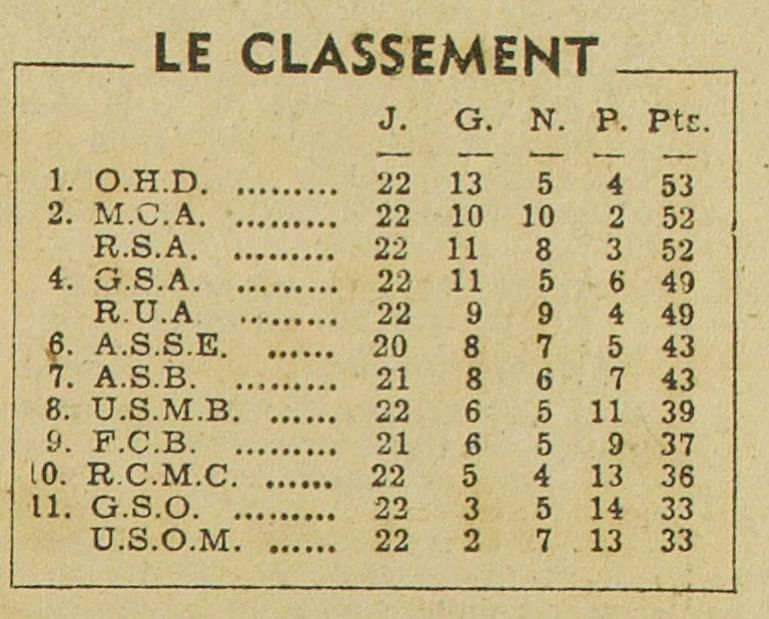
1947–48 League Algiers Standings

Pos	Team	Pld	W	D	L	GF	GA	GD	Pts	Qualification or relegation
1	O Hussein Dey (C)	22	13	5	4	42	23	+19	53	Qualified for North African Championship
2	MC Alger	22	10	10	2	32	17	+15	52	
3	RS Alger	22	11	8	3	24	21	+3	52	
4	GS Alger	22	11	5	6	0	0	0	49	
5	RU Alger	22	9	9	4	29	23	+6	49	
6	AS Saint Eugène	20	8	7	5	0	0	0	43	
7	AS Boufarik	21	8	6	7	0	0	0	43	
8	USM Blida	22	6	5	11	19	30	−11	39	
9	FC Blida	20	6	5	9	0	0	0	37	
10	RC Maison Carrée	22	5	4	13	0	0	0	36	
11	GS Orléansville	22	3	5	14	0	0	0	33	
12	USO Mitidja	22	2	7	13	0	0	0	33	Relegated to 1950–51 First Division

Source: L'Echo d'Alger
(C) Champions

=== Matches ===
Win Draw Loss

14 September 1947 1	AS Boufarik	0–0	USM Blida	Boufarik
15:00	Hernandez, Boisel, Cortès, Barbaros, Vicédo, Gotvallès, Robert, Reichert, Salva, Alvado, Samouilhant	Report	Menacer, Zerrouki, Mansouri; Zidoun, Bob, Zahzah; Benelfoul, Laidi, Bensamet, Bouguerra I, Hatem	Referee: Baroni

21 September 1947 2	GS Orléansville	0–3	USM Blida	Orléansville
15:00	Pech, Maizza, Taza, Buda, Aziza, Boulassel, Nasri, Alberti, Aubert, Abed, Albentosa	Report	Bouguerra 40'; Bob (Free kick); Hatem Menacer; Zerrouki, Mansouri; Zouraghi, Bob, Zahzah; Benelfoul, Bensamet, Bernou, Bouguerra I, Hatem	Referee: Todori

5 October 1947 3	US Ouest Mitidja	2–4	USM Blida	El Affroun
15:00	Rouquié 15'; Belhadj Manchon, Yung, Rouquier, Defnet, Garcia, Gaillard, Saes, Bottaro, Boguerra, Bakani, Lequette	Report	18' Bensamet; 35' Bernou; 50', 60' Benelfoul Menacer, Zerrouki, Mansouri; Zouraghi, Bob, Zahzah; Benelfoul, Bensamet, Bernou, Bouguerra I, Hatem	Referee: Attanasio

12 October 1947 4	USM Blida	2–0	RC Maison-Carrée	Blida
15:00	Bernou 20'; Bouguerra I Menacer, Zerrouki, Mansouri; Zouraghi, Bob, Zahzah; Benelfoul, Bensamet, Bernou, Bouguerra I, Hatem	Report	Escalles, Botinelli, Poumaroux, de Martino, Sellal I, Perez, Marcellin, Roux, Roig, Mas, Picot	Stadium: FCB; Referee: Rivieccio

19 October 1947 5	USM Blida	0–2	AS Saint Eugène	Blida
15:00	Menacer, Zerrouki, Mansouri; Zouraghi, Bob, Laidi; Benelfoul, Bensamet, Bernou, Bouguerra I, Hatem	(0–0); Report	Benet 65'; Gomez Manuel 80' Kaoua, Manguel, Oliver, Aboulker, Stépanoff, Castaldi, de Villeneuve, Leber, Bendinelli, Benet, Gomez Manuel	Stadium: FCB; Attendance: 2,460; Referee: Pellegrineschi

16 November 1947 6	O Hussein Dey	3–0	USM Blida	Hussein Dey
15:00	Gomez 10', 30'; Belamine Ehrard, Cantino, Montovani, Ourzifi, Santiago, Portella, Gomez, Sintès, Belamine, Bakadja, Vaca	Report	Menacer, Boumediene Bekhoucha, Zerrouki, Mansouri; Zouraghi, Bob; Benelfoul, Bensamet, Bernou, Bouguerra I, Hatem	Referee: Baroni

23 November 1947 7	FC Blida	0–1	USM Blida	Blida
	Machtou, Bachelut, Antoine, Haddad, Pons, Pellegrini, Riéra, Fuster, Martinez, Hasni, Marquès	(0–1); Report	Bouguerra I 30' Menacer, Bekhoucha, Zerrouki, Mansouri; Zahzah, Zouraghi, Bob; Benelfoul, Bensamet, Bernou, Bouguerra I	Stadium: FCB

30 November 1947 8	USM Blida	0–1	GS Alger	Blida
	Menacer, Bouguerra II, Zerrouki, Mansouri, Zahzah, Bernou, Benelfoul, Bouchekeur, Bob, Bensamet, Bouguerra I	Report	Bagur 67' Testa, Daverio, Vitiello, Calmus A, Belmonte, Calmus Roger, Biton, Bagur, Mercadal, Calmus Robert, Fortuné	Stadium: FCB

14 December 1947 9	USM Blida	0–1	RU Alger	Blida
	Meradi, Zerrouki, Mansouri, Zahzah, Zouraghi, Imcaoudène as "Bob", Bensamet, Benelfoul, Bouchekeur, Bernou, Bouguerra I	(0–0); Report	Baylé 72' Pepe, Brouillet, Poizat, Vidal, Jasseron, Faglin, Danflous, Beringuey, Bayet, Gambaruti, Daube	Stadium: USB; Referee: Derradji

28 December 1947 10	MC Alger	3–0	USM Blida	Saint Eugène
	Deguigui 17'; El Mahdaoui 62', 76' Abtouche, Hamoutène, Khabatou, Kouar Sid Ahmed, Tadjet, Benhamou Hamid, Ait Saâda Mohamed, El Mehdaoui, Hahad, Abdelaoui, Deguigui	(1–0); Report	Meradi, Mansouri, Zerrouki, Zahzah, Zidoun, Zouraghi, Imcaoudène as "Bob", Bensamet as "Mellal", Benelfoul, Bouguerra I, Bernou	Stadium: Stade Communal Saint Eugène; Referee: Juan

18 January 1948 11	USM Blida	0–0	GS Orléansville	Blida
	Meradi, Zerrouki, Mansouri; Zahzah, Bernou, Zouraghi; Laidi, Benelfoul, Bensamet, Imcaoudène as "Bob", Hatem	Report	Pech, Mazza, Ben Bouali, Kermich, Zaza, Bida, Bernicola, Nassri, Canto, Aubert, Albentoza	Stadium: FCB; Referee: Romero

25 January 1948 12	USM Blida	2–1	US Ouest Mitidja	Blida
	Bensamet as "Mellal" 20'; Imcaoudène as "Bob" 22' Meradi, Zerrouki, Mansouri, Zahzah, Bernou, Zouraghi, Laidi, Benelfoul, Bensamet as "Mellal", Imcaoudène as "Bob", Hatem	Report; Report	Rouquier 33' (pen.) Rame, Rouquier, Defnet, Saes, Garcia, Bouguerra I, Cervera, Bottaro, Corat, Gaillard, Battanzi	Stadium: FCB

1 February 1948 13	RC Maison-Carrée	1–1	USM Blida	Maison-Carrée
	Marcellin 15' Escallès, Poumaroux, Maziz, Roux, Sellal I, Pico, Ségui, Sellal II, Roig, Aravit, Marcellin	(1–1); Report	Benelfoul (Hatem) 25' Meradi, Zerrouki, Mansouri, Zouraghi, Bernou, Zahzah, Laidi, Benelfoul, Bensamet as "Mellal", Imcaoudène as "Bob", Hatem	Referee: Buono

8 February 1948 14	USM Blida	0–2	RS Alger	Blida
	Meradi, Zerrouki, Mansouri, Laidi, Bernou, Zouraghi, Zahzah, Bouguerra II, Imcaoudène as "Bob", Benelfoul, Bensamet as "Mellal"	(0–0); Report; Report	Falandry 68', 83' Bouquet, Giuganti, Zérapha, Senane, Caillat, Saâdi, Maouch, Ponseti, Falandry, Maggliozy, Gélabert	Stadium: FCB; Referee: Attanasio

22 February 1948 15	AS Saint Eugène	0–0	USM Blida	Saint Eugène
	Kaoua, Aboulker, Oliver, Vidal, Stépanoff, de Villeneuve, Rivas, Bendinelli, Benet, Castaldi, Gomez	Report	Meradi, Zerrouki, Mansouri, Bouguerra II, Bernou, Zouraghi, Benelfoul, Khelifa, Bensamet as "Mellal", Imcaoudène as "Bob", Hatem	Referee: Graziani

29 February 1948 16	USM Blida	1–2	O Hussein Dey	Blida
	Bensamet as "Mellal" 75' Menacer, Zerrouki, Mansouri, Zahzah, Bernou, Zouraghi, Khelifa, Benelfoul, Bensamet as "Mellal", Imcaoudène as "Bob", Hatem	Report; Report	Bakadja 12'; Ouzrifi 86' Ehrard, Cantino, Montovoni, Fiol, Santiago, Ouzrifi, Gomez Manuel, Bakadja, Belamine, Fez, Santiago	Stadium: FCB; Referee: Boccheciampe

7 March 1948 17	AS Boufarik	1–2	USM Blida	Boufarik
	Defrance 50' Hernandez, Massip Alexandre, Chazou, Bouazel, Vicédo, Massa Robert, Riohier, Defrance, Gootvallès, Vidal	(0–1); Report	Bouguerra II 17'; Bernou 60' Meradi, Zerrouki, Mansouri, Bernou, Zahzah, Zouraghi, Bensamet as "Mellal", Bouguerra II, Imcaoudène as "Bob", Benelfoul, Hatem	Referee: Riveccio

14 March 1948 18	USM Blida	0–1	FC Blida	Blida
	Menacer, Mansouri, Bernou, Zahzah, Benelfoul, Bouguerra II, Hatem, Khelifa, Imcaoudène as "Bob", Zouraghi, Bensamet as "Mellal"	Report	Antoine 75' Machtou, Pellégrini, Pons, Bachelut, Haddad, Hasni, Riéra, Fuster, Antoine, Guarinos, Marquez	Stadium: FCB; Attendance: 2,200

21 March 1948 19	GS Alger	3–0	USM Blida	Algiers
15:30	Deléo; Bagur	(0–0); Report	Menacer, Mansouri, Zerrouki, Bouguerra II, Zouraghi, Zidoun, Bensamet, Benelfoul, Khelifa, Hatem, Bernou	Referee: Caratino

4 April 1948 20	RU Alger	0–0	USM Blida	Algiers
	Pepe, Sellal, Berenguer, Brouillet, Jasseron, Vivès, Gambarutti, Poizat, Vidal, Lorenzo, Daube	Report	Meradi, Zerrouki, Bouguerra II, Benelfoul, Mansouri, Bernou, Bensamet as "Mellal", Khelifa, Zidoun, Imcaoudène as "Bob", Hatem	Referee: Todori

11 April 1948 21	RS Alger	3–1	USM Blida	Algiers
	Saâdi; Pénalva; Maouch Bouquet, Giganti, Allès, Clément, Zérapha, Senane, Maouch, Sadi Yahia, Falandry, Ponseti, Pénalva	(1–1); Report	Imcaoudène as "Bob" Meradi, Bouguerra II, Mansouri, Zidoun, Bernou, Benelfoul, Bensamet as "Mellal", Khelifa, Zouraghi, Imcaoudène as "Bob", Hatem	Referee: Lebeuvant

18 April 1948 22	USM Blida	2–4	MC Alger	Blida
	Zouraghi; Chouiet Meradi, Zerrouki, Reguieg, Zidoun Boualem, Laidi, Rabah, Bensamet as "Mellal", Zouraghi, Chouiet, Youssari, Lekhal	(0–4); Report	Hahad; Kouar Omar; Deguigui Abtouche, Hamoutène, Benhamou Hamid, Hanoune, Tadjet, Khabatou, Kouar Omar dit Kouar II, Basta Ali, Hahad, Kouar Sid Ahmed, Deguigui	Stadium: FCB

== Forconi Cup ==
26 October 1947 Fourth Round	Stade Guyotville	1–0	USM Blida	Saint Eugène
14:30	Vitollo 88'	Report	Menacer, Zerrouki, Mansouri; Zouraghi, Bob, Laidi; Benelfoul, Bensamet, Bernou, Bouguerra I, Hatem	Stadium: Stade Communal Saint Eugène; Referee: M. Attansio

== Players statistics ==
=== Playing statistics ===
Pos.	Name	Division Honneur																						Forconi Cup	Total
Pos.	Name	1	2	3	4	5	6	7	8	9	10	11	12	13	14	15	16	17	18	19	20	21	22	1	Total
GK	(Algeria) Menacer	X	X	X	X	X	X	X	X								X		X	X				X	12
GK	(Algeria) Meradi									X	X	X	X	X	X	X		X			X	X	X		11
DF	(Algeria) Mansouri	X	X	X	X	X	X	X	X	X	X	X	X	X	X	X	X	X	X	X	X	X		X	22
DF	(Algeria) Zerrouki	X	X	X	X	X	X	X	X	X	X	X	X	X	X	X	X	X		X	X		X	X	21
DF	(Algeria) Zahzah	X	X	X	X			X	X	X	X	X	X	X	X		X	X	X						15
DF	(Algeria) Bouguerra II								X						X	X		X	X	X	X	X			8
DF	(Algeria) Bekhoucha						X	X																	2
DF	(Algeria) Reguieg																						X		1
DF	(Algeria) Rabah																						X		1
MF	(Algeria) Bob	X	X	X	X	X	X	X	X	X	X	X	X	X	X	X	X	X	X		X	X		X	21
MF	(Algeria) Bernou		X	X	X	X	X	X	X	X	X	X	X	X	X	X	X	X	X	X	X	X		X	21
MF	(Algeria) Zouraghi		X	X	X	X	X	X		X	X	X	X	X	X	X	X	X	X	X		X		X	19
MF	(Algeria) Laidi	X				X						X	X	X	X								X	X	8
MF	(Algeria) Zidoun	X									X									X	X	X	X		6
DF	(Algeria) Youssari																						X		1
FW	(Algeria) Bensamet	X	X	X	X	X	X	X	X	X	X	X	X	X	X	X	X	X	X	X	X	X	X	X	23
FW	(Algeria) Benelfoul	X	X	X	X	X	X	X	X	X	X	X	X	X	X	X	X	X	X	X	X	X		X	22
FW	(Algeria) Hatem	X	X	X	X	X	X					X	X	X		X	X	X	X	X	X	X		X	17
FW	(Algeria) Bouguerra I	X	X	X	X	X	X	X	X	X	X													X	11
FW	(Algeria) Khelifa															X	X		X	X	X	X			6
FW	(Algeria) Bouchekeur								X	X													X		3
FW	(Algeria) Chouiet																						X		1
FW	(Algeria) Lekhal																						X		1

No.	Pos	Nat	Player	Total		Division Honneur		Forconi Cup	
No.	Pos	Nat	Player	Apps	Goals	Apps	Goals	Apps	Goals
Goalkeepers
	GK	(Algeria) ALG	Abderrahmane Menacer	12	0	11	0	1	0
	GK	(Algeria) ALG	Abdelaziz Meradi	11	0	11	0	0	0
Defenders
	DF	(Algeria) ALG	Ali Mansouri	22	0	21	0	1	0
	DF	(Algeria) ALG	Rabah Zerrouki	21	0	20	0	1	0
	DF	(Algeria) ALG	M'henni Zahzah	15	0	15	0	0	0
	DF	(Algeria) ALG	Belkacem Bouguerra II	8	1	8	1	0	0
	DF	(Algeria) ALG	Boumediene Bekhoucha	2	0	2	0	0	0
	DF	(Algeria) ALG	Ali Reguieg	1	0	1	0	0	0
	DF	(Algeria) ALG	Rabah Hamou	1	0	1	0	0	0
Midfielders
	MF	(Algeria) ALG	Mohamed Imcaoudène (Bob)	21	3	20	3	1	0
	MF	(Algeria) ALG	Ahmed Bernou	21	3	20	3	1	0
	MF	(Algeria) ALG	Mahmoud Zouraghi	19	1	18	1	1	0
	MF	(Algeria) ALG	Mustapha Laidi	8	0	7	0	1	0
	MF	(Algeria) ALG	Boualem Zidoun	6	0	6	0	0	0
	MF	(Algeria) ALG	Embarek Youssari	1	0	1	0	0	0
Forwards
	MF	(Algeria) ALG	Kaddour Bensamet (Mellal)	23	3	22	3	1	0
	FW	(Algeria) ALG	Ahmed Benelfoul (c)	22	3	21	3	1	0
	FW	(Algeria) ALG	Abderrahmane Hatem	17	1	16	1	1	0
	FW	(Algeria) ALG	Mohamed Bouguerra I	11	3	10	3	1	0
	FW	(Algeria) ALG	Mohamed Khelifa	6	0	6	0	0	0
	FW	(Algeria) ALG	Mohamed Bouchekeur	1	0	1	0	0	0
	FW	(Algeria) ALG	Djilali Chouiet	1	1	1	1	0	0
	FW	(Algeria) ALG	Abdelkrim Lekhal	1	0	1	0	0	0

=== Goalscorers ===
Includes all competitive matches. The list is sorted alphabetically by surname when total goals are equal.

Nat.	Player	Pos.	DH	FC	TOTAL
(Algeria)	Mohamed Bouguerra I	FW	3	0	3
(Algeria)	Ahmed Benelfoul	FW	3	0	3
(Algeria)	Ahmed Bernou	FW	3	0	3
(Algeria)	Kaddour Bensamet	MF	3	0	3
(Algeria)	Mohamed Imcaoudène (Bob)	MF	3	0	3
(Algeria)	Abderrahmane Hatem	FW	1	0	1
(Algeria)	Mahmoud Zouraghi	FW	1	0	1
(Algeria)	Djilali Chouiet	FW	1	0	1
(Algeria)	Belkacem Bouguerra II	DF	1	0	1
Totals			19	0	19

== Transfers ==
=== In ===
Pos	Player	From club
FW	Mohamed Khelifa	RC Maison Carré

=== Out ===
Pos	Player	From club
FW	Abdelkader Djoudad	WA Boufarik
FW	Ahmed Dahmouche	WA Boufarik
DF	Abdelaziz Chekaimi	USMB Reserve
