= 1933–34 USM Blida season =

USM Blida
1933–34 season
- President: Ali Rouabah as Braham
- Head coach: Abdelkader Hadef
- Stadium: Duruy Stadium
- Third Division: 2nd / 6
- North African Cup: 2nd Round
Home colours

The 1933–34 season was Union Sportive Musulmane Blidéenne's 1st season in existence. The club played in the Third Division for the 1st season French colonial era, as well as the North African Cup.

== Squad ==
Source Note: Flags indicate national team as defined under FIFA eligibility rules; some limited exceptions apply. Players may hold more than one non-FIFA nationality.

No.	Pos.	Nation	Player
—	GK	FRA	Dahmane Aoudiani
—	GK	FRA	Mohamed Benmeida as Moréna
—	DF	FRA	Albert Marghella
—	DF	FRA	Ahmed Haouari (Captain)
—	MF	FRA	Sid Ahmed Chelha
—	MF	FRA	Khelil Berreka
—	MF	FRA	Abderrahmane Karadaniz as Zahout
—	FW	FRA	Saïd Khaldi

No.	Pos.	Nation	Player
—	FW	FRA	Kalouche
—	FW	FRA	Mohamed Guergadj
—	FW	FRA	Mohamed Bouchama
—	FW	FRA	Mohamed Loukhaoukha as Berrahal
—	FW	FRA	Abderrahmane Hatem
—	FW	FRA	Christophe Sintas as Toto
—	FW	FRA	Hacéne Kermouche
—	FW	FRA	Omar Oucifi as Négro

Note: Flags indicate national team as defined under FIFA eligibility rules; some limited exceptions apply. Players may hold more than one non-FIFA nationality.

No.	Pos.	Nation	Player
—		FRA	Dahmane Aoudiani
—		FRA	Dahbi Cadi
—	DF	FRA	Mohamed Zouraghi
—		FRA	Rabah Hamou
—		FRA	Laid
—	FW	FRA	Bouzar
—		FRA	Nassef
—		FRA	Ali

No.	Pos.	Nation	Player
—	FW	FRA	Abdelkader Hadef
—		FRA	Hadj Kouira
—		FRA	Bouhenaoua
—		FRA	Boualem Ameur
—		FRA	Challal
—	FW	FRA	Allel Boukhdimi
—		FRA	Mahmoud Boukhdimi
—		FRA	Zoulai

=== Transfers ===
In
Pos.	Name	from
GK	Dahmane Aoudiani	FC Blida "B"
GK	Mohamed Benmeida as Moréna	US Blida
DF	Albert Marghella	
FW	Hacène Kermouche as Hassen	US Blida
FW	Omar Oucifi as Négro	US Blida
FW	Kalouche	US Blida
FW	Christophe Sintas	US Blida
FW	Alexandre Huillet	
FW	Joseph Vincente	

== Competitions ==
=== Overview ===
Competition	Record							
Competition	G	W	D	L	GF	GA	GD	Win %
Third Division	10	6	1	3	15	18	−3	60.00
Play-off	1	0	0	1	0	3	−3	0.00
North African Cup	2	1	0	1	2	4	−2	50.00
Total	13	7	1	5	17	25	−8	53.85

=== League table ===
Pos	Team	Pld	W	D	L	GF	GA	GD	Pts	Qualification or relegation
1	SC Médéa	10	9	0	1	28	5	+23	28	Promoted to Second Division
2	USM Blida	10	6	1	3	15	18	−3	23	Qualification to play-offs
3	AS Douéra	10	5	2	3	30	8	+22	22	Qualification to play-offs
4	AS Saoula-Birkhadem	10	4	2	4	22	13	+9	20	Qualification to play-offs
5	US Koléa	10	3	1	6	7	19	−12	17	
6	AS Agha	10	0	0	10	3	52	−49	8 (Note: 2 point deducted)	

Source: League table

=== Results ===
Home \ Away	ASA	ASD	ASSB	SCM	UK	USMB
AS Agha		0–17	0–7	0–5	0–2	0–3*
AS Douera	2–1		1–1	2–1	5–0	0–2
AS Saoula-Birkhadem	6–2	1–1		0–1	2–0	3–2
SC Médéa	3–0*	1–0	2–0		2–1	8–1
Union Koléa	10–0	1–2	1–0	0–5		0–1
USM Blida	3–0	1–0*	3–2	1–3	2–2	

Updated to match(es) played on unknown. Source:
Legend: Blue = home team win; Yellow = draw; Red = away team win.

== Third Division ==
=== Matches ===
Win Draw Loss

5 November 1933 1	USM Blida	1–3	SC Médéa	Blida
	Saïd Khaldi Aoudiani; Haouari, Marghella; Chelha, Berraka, Karadaniz; Loukhaoukha, Saïd, Bouzar, Bouchama, Guergadj.	(1–1); Report	Battus ?' (pen.)	Stadium: Duruy Stadium; Referee: M. Penin

12 November 1933 2	AS Saoula-Birkhadem	3–2	USM Blida	Saoula
9:45	Mahidène; Cabanis II ?' (pen.) Mahmoud, Cabanis I, Cabanis II, Germain, Jener, Mercadal-Gener, Mahidène ...	Report	Aoudiani, Haouari, Marghella; Chelha, Berraka, Karadaniz; ...	Referee: M. Weiss

26 November 1933 3	USM Blida	3–0	AS Agha	Blida
14:45	(Bouchama assist) Berreka 20'; Chelha Aoudiani; Haouari, Marghella; Chelha, Berraka, Karadaniz; Loukhaoukha, Saïd, Sintas, Bouchama, Guergadj. 2nd team: Allel, Toumi, Laid, Challal, Zouraghi, Naceur, Hadef, Oucha, Gherbi, Hatem, Badja	Report	Aousk, Faus, Barbère, Achou, Guellati, Elesas, Forner, Sehrane, Gatt, Zellard, Astudo	Stadium: Duruy Stadium; Referee: Alcaras

10 December 1933 4	US Koléa	0–1	USM Blida	Koléa
	Sellès, de Longchamps, Ramos...	Report	Mohamed Bouchama 40' Aoudiani; Haouari, Marghella; Chelha, Berraka, Karadaniz; Bouchama ...	Referee: M. Pelicer

17 December 1933 5	AS Douéra	0–2	USM Blida	Douéra
14:45		Report	Mohamed Loukhaoukha as Berrahal 30', 35' Aoudiani; Haouari, Marghella; Chelha, Berraka, Karadaniz; Loukhaoukha	Referee: M. Caratino

7 January 1934	SC Médéa	v	USM Blida	Médéa

24 January 1934	USM Blida	v	AS Saoula-Birkhadem	Blida

4 February 1934	AS Agha	v	USM Blida	Fort-de-l'Eau

18 February 1934	USM Blida	v	US Koléa	Blida

25 February 1934 8	AS Agha	w/o	USM Blida	Fort-de-l'Eau
		Report		Stadium: Stade de l'OMR

4 March 1934 10	USM Blida	w/o	AS Douéra	Blida
	Aoudiani; Haouari, Marghella; Chelha, Berraka, ...	Report
Note: USMB against AS Douéra (0-1) with the participation of the player Dijou Jean (suspended). ASD loses its match

11 March 1934 6	SC Médéa	8–1	USM Blida	Médéa
14:45		Report	Aoudiani; Haouari, Marghella; Chelha, Berraka, Karadaniz; ...

18 March 1934 7	USM Blida	3–2	AS Saoula-Birkhadem	Blida
	Mohamed Bouchama (pen.) Aoudiani; Haouari, Marghella; Chelha, Berraka, Huillet; Loukhaoukha, Bouchama, Niebo?, Guergadj, Vincente	Report	Goal	Stadium: Duruy Stadium

25 March 1934 9	USM Blida	2–2	US Koléa	Blida
	Aoudiani; Haouari, Marghella; Chelha, Berraka,	Report		Stadium: Duruy Stadium

=== Play-off ===
3 June 1934	AST Alger	3–0	USM Blida	Fort-de-l'Eau
15:45		Report		Referee: Dourdona

== North African Cup ==
24 September 1933 1st Round	USM Blida	2–1	SC Ménerville	Rouiba, Algiers
14:00	Saïd Khaldi 20' (Mohamed Loukhaoukha as Berrahal); Omar Oucifi as Négro 85' Aoudiani; Houari, Marghella; Berraka, Zouraghi, Karadaniz; Loukhaoukha, Saïd, Sintas, Bouzar, Hadef.	Report	? (penalty missed) Ordinès, Toumi, Simon, X, Quessada, Trivès, Rognon, Saffa, Dustan H, Pérez, Huguin	Stadium: Stade Lebon; Referee: Ogué

15 October 1933 2nd Round	GS Alger	3–0	USM Blida	Boufarik
13:00	Wilker; Aoudiani (o.g.) Requin, Mouthier, Vallier, Imbernon, Arhant, Sadi, Fourest, Guillamot, Wilker, Suchet, Azam	Report	Aoudiani; Houari, Marghella; Berraka, Zouraghi, Karadaniz; Loukhaoukha, Saïd, Oucifi, Bouchama, Chelha.	Stadium: Stade des Quincones; Attendance: 350; Referee: Laigros

== Squad statistics ==
=== Playing statistics ===
Pos.	Name	Division Honneur										Play-off	Forconi Cup		Total
Pos.	Name	1	2	3	4	5	6	7	8	9	10	1	1	2	Total
GK	(France) Dahmane Aoudiani														
DF	(France) Albert Marghella														
DF	(France) Ahmed Houari (c)	X	X	X	X	X	X	X	X	X	X	X	X	X	13
MF	(France) Sid Ahmed Chelha														
DF	(France) Mohamed Zouraghi														
MF	(France) Khellil Berreka														
MF	(France) Abderrahmane Karadaniz														
MF	(France) Mohamed Loukhaoukha														
FW	(France) Mohamed Bouchama (c)														
FW	(France) Mohamed Guergadj														
MF	(France) Saïd Khaldi														
FW	(France) Mohamed Loukhaoukha as Berrahal														
FW	(France) Christophe Sintas														
FW	(France) Bouzar														
FW	(France) Abdelkader Hadef														
FW	(France) Omar Oucifi														
FW	(France) Hacéne Kermouche														
FW	(France) Allel Boukhdimi														
FW	(France) Abderrahmane Hatem														
	(France) Alexandre Huillet														
	(France) Joseph Vincente														

=== Goalscorers ===
Includes all competitive matches. The list is sorted alphabetically by surname when total goals are equal.

Nat.	Player	Pos.	DH	FC	TOTAL
(France)	Mohamed Loukhaoukha as Berrahal	FW	2	0	2
(France)	Sid Ahmed Chelha	MF	2	0	2
(France)	Saïd Khaldi	MF	1	1	2
(France)	Khellil Berreka	MF	1	0	1
(France)	Mohamed Bouchama	FW	1	0	1
(France)	Omar Oucifi as Négro	FW	0	1	1
Unknown			8	0	8
Totals			7+8	2	17
