= List of USM Blida seasons =

USM Blida is a football club based in Blida. The club was formed in 1932 by some of Algerian nationalists which decided to create a Muslim club to compete with the European clubs of the moments when Algeria was a French district (French Algeria).

This page is a season-by-season record of club's league and cup performance in national and international competitions.

== Before independence ==
Below, the USM Blida season-by-season record before independence in the French Algeria period :

(France) FFF - season-by-season record of USM Blida
| Season | League of Algiers | | | | | | | | | | | Algiers League Cup | Coupe de France | North African Cup |
| Season | Division | Pos. | Pts | P | W | D | L | F | A | GD | Goalscorer | Algiers League Cup | Coupe de France | North African Cup |
|---|---|---|---|---|---|---|---|---|---|---|---|---|---|---|
Union Sportive Musulmane Blidéenne (USMB)
| 1933-34 | 3rd Division (Note: The USMB start in the 3rd Regional Division of Algiers, corresponding to the 7th French division.) | 2nd /6 | 23 | 10 | 6 | 1 | 3 | 15 | 18 | -3 | - | - | — | 2nd qualifying round |
| 1934-35 | 3rd Division | 2nd /6 | 25 | 10 | 7 | 1 | 2 | 14 | 9 | +5 | - | - | — | 1st qualifying round |
| 1935-36 | 3rd Division | 3rd /6 | 20 | 10 | 6 | 0 | 4 | 12 | 4 | +8 | - | - | — | 1st qualifying round |
| 1936-37 | 3rd Division ↑ | 1st /7 | 36 | 12 | 10 | 1 | 1 | 67 | 7 | +60 | - | - | — | 2nd qualifying round |
| 1937-38 | 2nd Division ↑ (Note: The USMB start in the 2nd Regional Division of Algiers, corresponding to the 6th French division.) | 1st /7 | 27 | 12 | 8 | 4 | 0 | 29 | 16 | +13 | Omar Oucif (15) | - | — | 2nd qualifying round |
| 1938-39 | 1st Division | 10th/10 | 25 | 18 | 2 | 3 | 13 | 20 | 46 | -26 | Omar Oucif (+10) | - | — | 2nd qualifying round |
| 1939-40 | War championship | 3rd /7 | 27 | 12 | 5 | 5 | 2 | 22 | 11 | +11 | Benelfoul (5) | Round of 16 | — | not held (Note: The competition were cancelled because the Second World War) |
| 1940-41 | Critérium 1st Division | 1st /6 | 28 | 10 | 8 | 2 | 0 | 33 | 9 | +24 | Benelfoul (+5) | Round of 16 | — | not held |
| 1941-42 | 1st Division ↑ | 1st/10 | 52 | 18 | 15 | 3 | 0 | 46 | 11 | +35 | - | 4th round | — | 4th qualifying round |
| 1942-43 | War championship | 1st | - | - | - | - | - | - | - | - | - | 3rd round | — | not held (Note: The competition were cancelled because the Second World War) |
| 1943-44 | War championship | 1st /12 | 64 | 22 | 21 | 0 | 1 | 45 | 9 | +36 | - | - | — | not held |
| 1944-45 | War championship | 1st /8 | 42 | 14 | 14 | 0 | 0 | 40 | 3 | +37 | - | Winner | — | not held |
| 1945–46 | Division d'Honneur ↓ | 10th/11 | 37 | 20 | 6 | 5 | 9 | 25 | 29 | -4 | Hatem (5) | Round of 32 | — | not held |
| 1946–47 | 1st Division ↑ (Note: The USMB start in the 1st Regional Division of Algiers, corresponding to the 5th French division.) | 1st/18 | 51 | 18 | 15 | 3 | 0 | 76 | 7 | +68 | Djoudad (+14) | Semi-final | — | Quarter-final |
| 1947–48 | Division d'Honneur (Note: The USMB start in the Honor Division of Algiers, corresponding to the 4th French division.) | 8th/12 | 39 | 22 | 6 | 5 | 11 | 19 | 30 | -11 | Bouguerra (4) | 4th round | — | 4th qualifying round |
| 1948–49 | Division d'Honneur | 8th/12 | 42 | 22 | 7 | 6 | 9 | 36 | 33 | +3 | Mahieddine (17) | Quarter-final | — | 6th qualifying round |
| 1949–50 | Division d'Honneur | 8th/12 | 43 | 22 | 6 | 9 | 7 | 29 | 28 | +1 | Mahieddine (8) | Round of 16 | — | 5th qualifying round |
| 1950–51 | Division d'Honneur | 9th/12 | 41 | 22 | 5 | 9 | 8 | 24 | 31 | -7 | Mahieddine (7) | Round of 16 | — | 5th qualifying round |
| 1951–52 | Division d'Honneur | 10th/12 | 41 | 22 | 6 | 7 | 9 | 28 | 30 | -2 | Mahieddine (10) | Round of 16 | — | 5th qualifying round |
| 1952–53 | Division d'Honneur | 10th/12 | 42 | 22 | 8 | 4 | 10 | 23 | 27 | -4 | Boumbadji (6) | Semi-final | — | Round of 32 |
| 1953–54 | Division d'Honneur | 7th/12 | 43 | 22 | 7 | 7 | 8 | 38 | 33 | +5 | Mazouz (15) | Quarter-final | — | Semi-final |
| 1954–55 | Division d'Honneur | 5th/12 | 44 | 22 | 7 | 8 | 7 | 27 | 35 | -8 | Mazouz (12) | Quarter-final | 1st round qualifying | Round of 32 |
| 1955–56 | Division d'Honneur | 5th/12 | 32 | 15 | 7 | 3 | 5 | 31 | 22 | +9 | Sebkhaoui (8) | Quarter-final | 2nd round qualifying | Round of 32 |
No competition is played by the muslim clubs between 1956 and 1962 by order of the FLN (Algerian War)

=== Overall ===
- Seasons spent at Level 1 of the football league system: 10
- Seasons spent at Level 2 of the football league system: 8
- Seasons spent at Level 3 of the football league system: 1
- Seasons spent at Level 4 of the football league system: 4

As of 31 May 2026:

FAF competitions
| Competition | Seasons | Played | Won | Drawn | Lost | Goals For | Goals Against | Last season played |
|---|---|---|---|---|---|---|---|---|
| Honor Division | 10 | 211 | 65 | 63 | 83 | 278 | 289 | 1955–56 |
| First Division | 3 | 54 | 32 | 9 | 13 | 142 | 64 | 1946–47 |
| Second Division | 1 | 12 | 8 | 4 | 0 | 29 | 16 | 1937–38 |
| Third Division | 4 | 42 | 29 | 3 | 10 | 108 | 38 | 1936–37 |
| War Championship (1939-45) | 5 | | | | | | | 1944–45 |
| Playoffs | 9 | 20 | 12 | 6 | 2 | 58 | 20 | 1952–53 |
| Forconi Cup | 12 | 30 | 23 | 0 | 7 | 74 | 34 | 1955–56 |
| Coupe de France | 2 | 3 | 1 | 0 | 2 | 2 | 6 | 1955–56 |
| North African Cup | 5 | 10 | 4 | 1 | 5 | 10 | 15 | 1955–56 |
| Total | 23 | 382 | 174 | 86 | 122 | 701 | 482 | |

== After independence ==
Below, the USM Blida season-by-season record after independence of Algeria :

| Season | League | | | | | | | | | | Cup | League Cup | Arab Cup | | Top goalscorer(s) | | Ref. |
| Season | Division | Pos | Pts | P | W | D | L | GF | GA | GD | Cup | League Cup | Arab Cup | | Name | Goals | |
|---|---|---|---|---|---|---|---|---|---|---|---|---|---|---|---|---|---|
| 1962-1963 | Critérium Honneur | 3rd | 41 | 18 | 10 | 3 | 5 | 57 | 12 | +45 | R16 | — | - | - | - | - | |
| 1963-1964 | Division Honneur | 4th | 72 | 30 | 18 | 6 | 6 | 46 | 28 | +18 | R64 | — | - | - | Gérard Baldo | 20 | |
| 1964-1965 | Division 1 | 11th | 57 | 30 | 8 | 12 | 10 | 36 | 37 | -1 | SF | — | - | - | Guerrache | - | |
| 1965-1966 | Division 1 | 12th | 58 | 30 | 10 | 8 | 12 | 34 | 38 | -4 | R32 | — | - | - | - | - | |
| 1966-1967 | Division 1 | 11th | 35 | 22 | 3 | 7 | 12 | 23 | 36 | -13 | R32 | — | - | - | - | - | |
| 1967-1968 | Division 2 | 9th | 42 | 22 | 7 | 6 | 9 | 26 | 25 | +1 | R32 | — | - | - | El Hadi Benturki | 7 | |
| 1968-1969 | Division 2 | 9th | 41 | 22 | 7 | 7 | 8 | 22 | 27 | -5 | R16 | — | - | - | - | - | |
| 1969-1970 | Division 2 | 4th | 44 | 22 | 8 | 6 | 8 | 29 | 24 | +5 | R16 | — | - | - | - | - | |
| 1970-1971 | Division 2 | 6th | 48 | 24 | 7 | 9 | 8 | 34 | 33 | +1 | R64 | — | - | - | - | - | |
| 1971-1972 | Division 2 | 1st | 55 | 22 | 15 | 3 | 4 | 46 | 20 | +26 | PR | — | - | - | - | - | |
| 1972-1973 | Division 1 | 11th | 59 | 30 | 9 | 11 | 10 | 40 | 45 | -5 | SF | — | - | - | - | - | |
| 1973-1974 | Division 1 | 12th | 57 | 30 | 8 | 11 | 11 | 30 | 40 | -10 | R64 | — | - | - | - | - | |
| 1974-1975 | Division 1 | 16th | 48 | 30 | 7 | 4 | 19 | 20 | 53 | -33 | QF | — | - | - | - | - | |
| 1975-1976 | Division 2 | 2nd | 61 | 26 | 14 | 7 | 6 | 47 | 29 | +18 | PR | — | - | - | - | - | |
| 1976-1977 | Division 2 | 2nd | | 26 | | | | | | | R64 | — | - | - | - | - | |
| 1977-1978 | Division 2 | 14th | | 26 | | | | | | | R32 | — | - | - | - | - | |
| 1978-1979 | Division 2 | 14th | | 26 | | | | | | | | — | - | - | - | - | |
| 1979-1980 | Division 3 | 5th | | | | | | | | | | — | - | - | - | - | |
| 1980-1981 | Division 3 | 5th | | | | | | | | | | — | - | - | - | - | |
| 1981-1982 | Division 3 | 3rd | | | | | | | | | | — | - | - | - | - | |
| 1982-1983 | Division 3 | 2nd | | | | | | | | | R16 | — | - | - | Mahmoud Guettal | - | |
| 1983-1984 | Division 3 | 2nd | | | | | | | | | R32 | — | - | - | Mahmoud Guettal | - | |
| 1984-1985 | Division 2 | 3rd | 69 | 30 | 13 | 13 | 4 | 48 | 24 | +24 | R32 | — | - | - | Mahmoud Guettal | - | |
| 1985-1986 | Division 2 | 4th | 66 | 30 | 16 | 6 | 8 | 46 | 25 | +21 | SF | — | - | - | Djahmoune & Mahmoud Guettal | 15 | |
| 1986-1987 | Division 2 | 2nd | 35 | 31 | 15 | 5 | 11 | 44 | 31 | +13 | R64 | — | - | - | Mahmoud Guettal | - | |
| 1987-1988 | Division 2 | 2nd | 46 | 34 | 16 | 15 | 3 | 44 | 23 | +21 | R64 | — | - | - | Soltani & Mahmoud Guettal | 7 | |
| 1988-1989 | Division 2 | 4th | 38 | 32 | 15 | 8 | 9 | 38 | 30 | +8 | R32 | — | - | - | Mahmoud Guettal | 12 | |
| 1989-1990 | Division 2 | 9th | 28 | 30 | 9 | 10 | 11 | 21 | 27 | -6 | NP | — | - | - | Mahmoud Guettal | 5 | |
| 1990-1991 | Division 2 | 3rd | 36 | 30 | 16 | 4 | 10 | 38 | 24 | +14 | R64 | — | - | - | Billal Zouani | 8 | |
| 1991-1992 | Division 2 | 1st | 48 | 30 | 21 | 6 | 3 | 52 | 09 | +43 | R64 | — | - | - | Mohamed El Djazzar | 9 | |
| 1992-1993 | Division 1 | 9th | 28 | 30 | 9 | 10 | 11 | 27 | 27 | 0 | NP | — | - | - | Billal Zouani | 8 | |
| 1993-1994 | Division 1 | 5th | 32 | 30 | 11 | 10 | 9 | 33 | 28 | +5 | SF | — | - | - | Billal Zouani & Mustapha Chambit | 7 | |
| 1994-1995 | Division 1 | 3rd | 33 | 30 | 10 | 13 | 7 | 38 | 36 | +2 | R16 | — | - | - | Kamel Kaci-Saïd | 9 | |
| 1995-1996 | Division 1 | 14th | 34 | 30 | 9 | 7 | 14 | 34 | 36 | -2 | Final | GS | - | - | Billal Zouani & Mustapha Chambit | 7 | |
| 1996-1997 | Division 2 | 1st | 69 | 30 | 21 | 6 | 3 | 58 | 14 | +44 | R16 | — | Arab | G.S | Billal Zouani | 14 | |
| 1997-1998 | Division 1 | 8th | 12 | 14 | 1 | 9 | 4 | 9 | 13 | -4 | R32 | SF | - | - | Billal Zouani | 3 | |
| 1998-1999 | Division 1 | 6th | 42 | 26 | 12 | 6 | 8 | 27 | 27 | 0 | R16 | — | - | - | Billal Zouani | 6 | |
| 1999-2000 | Division 1 | 7th | 26 | 22 | 6 | 8 | 8 | 26 | 29 | -3 | QF | GS | - | - | Billal Zouani | 10 | |
| 2000-2001 | Division 1 | 4th | 45 | 30 | 14 | 5 | 11 | 42 | 30 | +12 | R32 | — | - | - | Kamel Kherkhache | 13 | |
| 2001-2002 | Division 1 | 13th | 36 | 30 | 10 | 8 | 12 | 37 | 28 | +9 | SF | — | - | - | Kamel Kherkhache | 14 | |
| 2002-2003 | Division 1 | 2nd | 51 | 30 | 14 | 9 | 7 | 32 | 22 | +10 | R64 | — | - | - | Mohamed Badache | 9 | |
| 2003-2004 | Division 1 | 7th | 41 | 30 | 11 | 8 | 11 | 34 | 29 | +5 | R32 | — | Arab | G.S | Mohamed Badache | 16 | |
| 2004-2005 | Division 1 | 6th | 42 | 30 | 11 | 9 | 10 | 36 | 29 | +7 | QF | — | - | - | Farid Touil | 10 | |
| 2005-2006 | Division 1 | 10th | 38 | 30 | 10 | 8 | 12 | 26 | 30 | -4 | R64 | — | - | - | Billal Zouani | 6 | |
| 2006-2007 | Division 1 | 9th | 39 | 30 | 9 | 12 | 9 | 33 | 28 | +5 | SF | — | - | - | Adlène Bensaïd | 12 | |
| 2007-2008 | Division 1 | 13th | 37 | 30 | 9 | 10 | 11 | 33 | 34 | -1 | R16 | — | - | - | Hamid Chahloul | 9 | |
| 2008-2009 | Division 1 | 15th | 33 | 32 | 8 | 9 | 15 | 23 | 31 | -8 | R16 | — | - | - | Farès Hamiti | 8 | |
| 2009-2010 | Division 1 | 12th | 43 | 34 | 11 | 10 | 13 | 30 | 33 | -3 | R16 | — | - | - | Ezechiel N'Douassel | 8 | |
| 2010-2011 | Division 1 | 16th | 29 | 30 | 7 | 8 | 15 | 16 | 30 | -14 | R32 | — | - | - | Abdelkader Harizi | 5 | |
| 2011-2012 | Division 2 | 5th | 45 | 30 | 12 | 9 | 9 | 40 | 36 | +4 | R64 | — | - | - | Brahim Ledraâ | 10 | |
| 2012-2013 | Division 2 | 5th | 48 | 30 | 13 | 9 | 8 | 44 | 27 | +17 | R16 | — | - | - | Mustapha Melika | 11 | |
| 2013-2014 | Division 2 | 6th | 47 | 30 | 13 | 8 | 9 | 34 | 25 | +9 | PR | — | - | - | Mohamed Amine Hammia | 8 | |
| 2014-2015 | Division 2 | 1st | 53 | 30 | 14 | 11 | 5 | 35 | 22 | +13 | R64 | — | - | - | Fethi Noubli | 14 | |
| 2015-2016 | Division 1 | 14th | 36 | 30 | 7 | 15 | 8 | 20 | 29 | -9 | R32 | — | - | - | Bedrane, Amiri, Hichem Cherif, Sylla | 3 | |
| 2016-2017 | Division 2 | 2nd | 51 | 30 | 14 | 9 | 7 | 31 | 19 | +12 | R32 | — | - | - | Youcef Zerguine | 8 | |
| 2017-2018 | Division 1 | 16th | 23 | 30 | 5 | 8 | 17 | 28 | 50 | -22 | QF | — | - | - | Samy Frioui | 17 | |
| 2018-2019 | Division 2 | 16th | 17 | 30 | 3 | 8 | 19 | 15 | 44 | -29 | R64 | — | - | - | Abdelmalik Hadef | 5 | |
| 2019-2020 | Division 3 | 8th | 31 | 24 | 7 | 10 | 7 | 23 | 19 | +4 | PR | — | - | - | Bilel Herbache | 6 | |
| 2020-2021 | Division 2 | 12th | 10 | 22 | 2 | 4 | 16 | 13 | 35 | -22 | NP | — | - | - | Karim Rachedi | 4 | |
| 2021-2022 | Division 3 | 11th | 43 | 30 | 12 | 7 | 11 | 28 | 30 | -2 | NP | — | - | - | Ilyes Bouhenniche | 6 | |
| 2022-2023 | Division 3 | 7th | 43 | 30 | 11 | 8 | 11 | 38 | 38 | 0 | PR | — | - | - | Abdelghani Badache | 12 | |
| 2023-2024 | Division 3 | 13th | 34 | 30 | 8 | 10 | 12 | 24 | 30 | -6 | R64 | — | - | - | Islem Haniched | 9 | |
| 2024-2025 | Division 3 | 5th | 50 | 30 | 14 | 10 | 6 | 43 | 23 | +20 | R64 | — | - | - | Chouaïb Mehatef | 8 | |
| 2025-2026 | Division 3 | 1st | 66 | 30 | 20 | 6 | 4 | 42 | 16 | +26 | R64 | — | - | - | Boukhors, Ounnas, Belkacecmi | 6 | |
| 2026-2027 | Division 2 | | | | | | | | | | | — | - | - | | | |

=== Overall ===
- Seasons spent at Level 1 of the football league system: 26
- Seasons spent at Level 2 of the football league system: 25
- Seasons spent at Level 3 of the football league system: 11
- Seasons spent at Level 4 of the football league system: 0

== Key ==
Key to league record:

- P = Played
- W = Games won
- D = Games drawn
- L = Games lost
- GF = Goals for
- GA = Goals against
- Pts = Points
- Pos = Final position

Key to divisions:

- 1 = Ligue 1
- 2 = Ligue 2

Key to rounds:

- DNE = Did not enter
- NP = Not played
- PR = Preliminary round
- Grp = Group stage
- R1 = First Round
- R2 = Second Round
- PO = Play-off round
- R32 = Round of 32
- R16 = Round of 16
- QF = Quarter-finals
- SF = Semi-finals
- RU = Runners-up
- W = Winners

| Champions | Runners-up | Promoted | Relegated |

Division shown in bold to indicate a change in division.
Top scorers shown in bold are players who were also top scorers in their division that season.

== Statistics ==
=== Algeria ===
As of 31 May 2026:

FAF competitions
| Competition | Seasons | Played | Won | Drawn | Lost | Goals For | Goals Against | Last season played |
|---|---|---|---|---|---|---|---|---|
| Algerian Ligue Professionnelle 1 | 26 | 750 | 229 | 235 | 286 | 769 | 855 | 2017–18 |
| Algerian Ligue 2 (Note: No statistics on the Algerian Ligue 2 for the seasons 1976–77, 1977–78 and 1978–79.) | 25 | 617 | 271 | 169 | 178 | 805 | 573 | 2020–21 |
| Inter-Régions Division (Note: No statistics on the Inter-Régions Division for the seasons 1979–80, 1980-81, 1981-82, 1982-83 and 1983-84.) | 11 | 174 | 72 | 51 | 51 | 198 | 156 | 2024–25 |
| Critérium d'Honneur | 1 | 18 | 10 | 3 | 5 | 57 | 12 | 1962–63 |
| Division d'Honneur | 1 | 30 | 18 | 6 | 6 | 46 | 28 | 1963–64 |
| Algerian Cup | 60 | 153 | 80 | 28 | 45 | 259 | 167 | 2024–25 |
| Algerian League Cup (defunct) | 3 | 20 | 8 | 6 | 6 | 25 | 19 | 1999–00 |
| **Total** | **63** | **1762** | **688** | **498** | **577** | **2159** | **1810** | |

=== Non-CAF competitions ===
As of 17 March 2004:

Non-CAF competitions
| Competition | Seasons | Played | Won | Drawn | Lost | Goals For | Goals Against | Last season played |
|---|---|---|---|---|---|---|---|---|
| Arab Champions League | 2 | 10 | 1 | 2 | 7 | 8 | 21 | 2003–04 |
| **Total** | **2** | **10** | **1** | **2** | **7** | **8** | **21** | |
