= 1934–35 USM Blida season =

USM Blida
1934–35 season
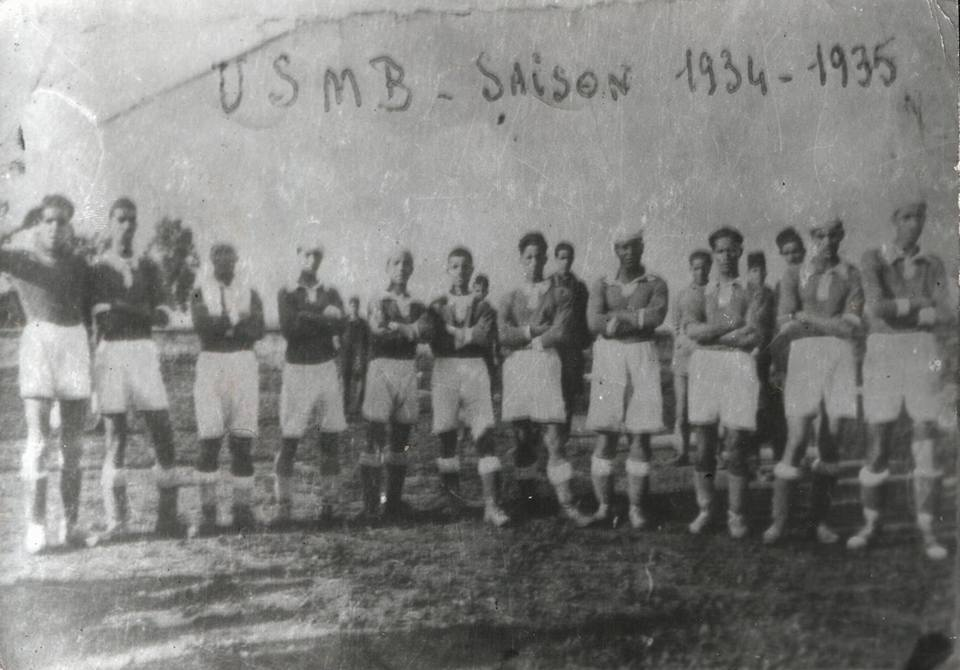
- Chairman: Ali Rouabah as Braham
- Head coach: Abdelkader Hadef
- Stadium: Duruy Stadium
- Third Division: 2nd / 6
- North African Cup: 1st Round
Home colours	Away colours

The 1934–35 season was Union Sportive Musulmane Blidéenne's 2nd season in existence. The club played in the Third Division for the 2nd season French colonial era, as well as the North African Cup.

== Friendly ==
Win Draw Loss

19 May 1935	USM Blida	2–1	JS Gambetta	Blida
	Hassene Kermouche Moréna, Hassene, Omar Negro, Said II, Chelha...	Report	Guittarni Branki, Kadouris, Hacene, Hocine, Merabet, Yacene	Stadium: FCB

== Squad ==
Source Note: Flags indicate national team as defined under FIFA eligibility rules; some limited exceptions apply. Players may hold more than one non-FIFA nationality.

No.	Pos.	Nation	Player
—	GK	(France) FRA	Dahmane Aoudiani
—	GK	(France) FRA	Mohamed Benmeida as Moréna
—	DF	(France) FRA	Albert Marghella
—	DF	(France) FRA	Ahmed Haouari (Captain)
—	DF	(France) FRA	Mahmoud Boukhdimi
—	MF	(France) FRA	Sid Ahmed Chelha
—	MF	(France) FRA	Khelil Berreka
—	MF	(France) FRA	Abderrahmane Karadaniz as Zahout
—	FW	(France) FRA	Saïd Khaldi

No.	Pos.	Nation	Player
—	FW	(France) FRA	Mohamed Berrahal as Kahlouche
—	FW	(France) FRA	Mohamed Guergadj
—	FW	(France) FRA	Mohamed Bouchama
—	FW	(France) FRA	Mohamed Loukhaoukha
—	FW	(France) FRA	Abderrahmane Hatem

Note: Flags indicate national team as defined under FIFA eligibility rules; some limited exceptions apply. Players may hold more than one non-FIFA nationality.

No.	Pos.	Nation	Player
—		(France) FRA	Dahbi Cadi
—	DF	(France) FRA	Mohamed Zouraghi
—		(France) FRA	Rabah Hamou
—		(France) FRA	Laid
—	FW	(France) FRA	Bouzar
—		(France) FRA	Nassef
—		(France) FRA	Ali

No.	Pos.	Nation	Player
—	FW	(France) FRA	Abdelkader Hadef
—		(France) FRA	Hadj Kouira
—		(France) FRA	Bouhenaoua
—		(France) FRA	Boualem Ameur
—		(France) FRA	Challal
—	FW	(France) FRA	Allel Boukhdimi
—		(France) FRA	Zoulai

== Competitions ==
=== Overview ===
Competition	Record							
Competition	G	W	D	L	GF	GA	GD	Win %
Third Division	10	7	1	2	14	9	+5	70.00
Play-off	3	0	3	0	1	1	+0	0.00
North African Cup	1	0	0	1	2	3	−1	0.00
Total	14	7	4	3	17	13	+4	50.00

=== League table ===
Pos	Team	Pld	W	D	L	GF	GA	GD	Pts	Qualification or relegation
1	AS Ghrib	10	8	1	1	11	2	+9	27	Qualification to play-offs
2	USM Blida	10	7	1	2	14	9	+5	25	Qualification to play-offs
3	CA Paté	10	4	2	4	11	10	+1	20	
4	FC Kouba	10	3	2	5	17	17	0	16 (Note: 2 point deducted)	
5	JS Saint Eugène	10	2	2	6	16	15	+1	14 (Note: 2 point deducted)	
6	Alger-la-Blance JPO	10	1	2	7	5	21	−16	13 (Note: 1 point deducted)	
7	Rampe Vallé Sportive	0	0	0	0	0	0	0	0	forfeit
8	US Koléa	0	0	0	0	0	0	0	0	forfeit

Source: League Table

== Results ==
Home \ Away	ASG	ALBJPO	CAP	FCK	JSSE	USMB
AS Ghrib		3–0*	4–0	3–0*	3–0*	5–0
ALBJPO	–		0–2	1–2	0–5	1–4
CA Paté	2–2	4–0		1–2	1–0	0–0
FC Kouba	0–3*	1–1	2–1		3–4	1–2
JS Saint Eugène	0–3*	2–2	1–2	4–4		0–1
USM Blida	0–1*	1–0	1–0	3–2	2–0	

Updated to match(es) played on unknown. Source:
Legend: Blue = home team win; Yellow = draw; Red = away team win.

== Third Division ==
=== Matches ===
Win Draw Loss

7 October 1934 1	AS Ghrib	5–0	USM Blida	Dolfusville
		Report		Referee: M. Garcia

14 October 1934	USM Blida	0–2	US Koléa	Blida
	Aoudiani; Marghella, Boukhedimi, Chelha, Houari, Saïd Khaldi, Bouchama, Hatem, Bouzar, Zahout	Report	Albertni 50', 60' (pen.)

28 October 1934	Rampe Vallée Sportive	0–5	USM Blida	Kouba
	San Félix, Norozoni, Spinatello, Ouzilou R, Ouzilou Roger, Steboul, Aldeguer, Mora, Arfit, Samuel Solal, Baâsina	Report	30' Loukhaoukha; 40' Karadaniz; Houari; Bouchama; Hatem Aoudiani, Mahmoud Boukhdimi, Marghella, Berrekaâ, Chelha, Karadaniz, Houari, Bouchama, Hatem, Khelladi, Loukhaoukha	Referee: M. Lofrédo

11 November 1934	FC Kouba	P–P	USM Blida	Kouba

18 November 1934	USM Blida	P–P	JS Saint-Eugène	Blida
		Report		Stadium: Duruy Stadium

25 November 1934 4	USM Blida	1–0	CA Paté	Blida
		Report		Stadium: Duruy Stadium

2 December 1934 2	FC Kouba	1–2	USM Blida	Kouba
		1; 2

16 December 1934 3	USM Blida	2–0	JS Saint-Eugène	Blida
10:00		Report		Stadium: Duruy Stadium

30 December 1934 6	USM Blida	0–1*	AS Ghrib	Blida
		Report		Stadium: Duruy Stadium
Note: Match interrupted

13 January 1935	USM Blida	7–1	Rampe Vallée Sportive	Blida
		Report		Stadium: Duruy Stadium

20 January 1935 5	Alger la Blance Olympique	1–4	USM Blida	Kouba
		1; 2

27 January 1935 7	USM Blida	3–2	FC Kouba	Blida
		Report		Stadium: Duruy Stadium

3 February 1935 8	JS Saint-Eugène	0–1	USM Blida	Kouba
	Hafiz, Coutenceau, Giménez; Lemoine, Gralfigna, Almarich; Guinard, Capo, Chardon, Pizzani, Sonnigo	Report	? (pen.) Aoudiani; Hanini, Boukhedimi; Berreka, Said, Chelha; Hatem, Bouchama, Houari, Loukhaoukha, Karadaniz	Referee: Impatina

17 February 1935 9	CA Paté	0–0	USM Blida	Kouba
		Report

3 March 1935 10	USM Blida	1–0	Alger la Blance Olympique	Blida
		Report		Stadium: Duruy Stadium

=== Play-off ===
10 March 1935	AS Ghrib	0–0	USM Blida	Mouzaia
15:00		Report

==== Second Place ====
31 March 1935	AS Douéra	1–1	USM Blida	Boufarik
		Report

7 April 1935	JSI Isserville	0–0	USM Blida	Caroubier
		Report

== North African Cup ==
21 October 1934 1st round	CA Paté	3–2	USM Blida	Douéra
14:30		Report
