= Zoubir Zouraghi Stadium =

Football stadium in Blida, Algeria

Coordinates: 36°28′49″N 2°48′46″E

Zoubir Zouraghi Stadium ملعب الشهيد زوبير زوراغي
- Interactive map of Zoubir Zouraghi Stadium ملعب الشهيد زوبير زوراغي
- Full name: Zoubir Zouraghi Stadium
- Former names: Stade du FCB
- Location: Blida, Algeria
- Owner: PMA of Blida
- Capacity: 3,000

Construction
- Opened: May 29, 1924

Zoubir Zouraghi Stadium is a soccer stadium in Blida, Algeria, it has a maximum capacity of 3,000 people.

== History ==
Dean of the Algiers League, FC Blida was founded in 1904 ten years after the first Oran clubs. The club took advantage of this precedence to dominate Algerian football in the 1920s, winning 5 Algiers Leagues and two AFN championships. In 1924, the club acquired its own land.

At the same time, US Blida was founded in 1920, which also built its own stadium almost next to that of the FCB. The USB will shine particularly by its rugby section, multiple champion of Algiers.

With decolonization, the FC Blidéen stadium will be used for a time by USM Blida.
