= 1947–48 MC Alger season =

MC Alger
1947–48 season
- Chairman: Abdellah Benhabyles
- Stadium: Stade de Saint-Eugène
- Division Honneur: Runners-up
- Forconi Cup: Winners
- North African Championship: Second round
- Top goalscorer: League: Omar Hahad (13); All: Omar Hahad (16)
Home colours

In the 1947–48 season, MC Alger competed in the Division Honneur for the 12th season French colonial era, as well as the Forconi Cup. They competed in Division Honneur, and the North African Cup.

== Competitions ==
=== Overview ===
Competition	Record								Started round	Final position / round	First match	Last match
Competition	G	W	D	L	GF	GA	GD	Win %	Started round	Final position / round	First match	Last match
Division Honneur	22	10	10	2	32	17	+15	45.45	—N/a	Runners-up	14 September 1947	18 April 1948
Forconi Cup	5	5	0	0	12	3	+9	100.00	Round of 32	Winners	26 October 1947	3 June 1948
Total	27	15	10	2	44	20	+24	55.56				

=== Division Honneur ===
==== League table ====
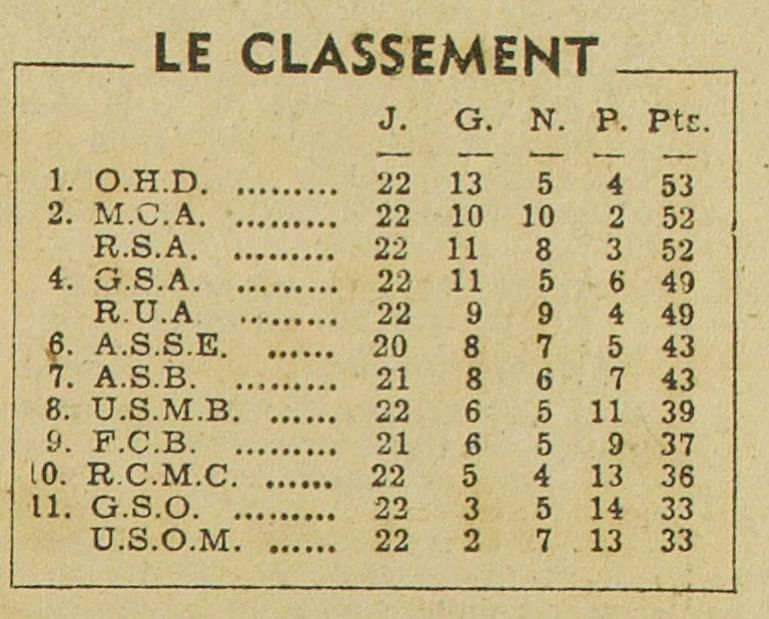
1947–48 League Algiers Standings

Pos	Team	Pld	W	D	L	GF	GA	GD	Pts	Qualification or relegation
1	O Hussein Dey (C)	22	13	5	4	42	23	+19	53	Qualified for North African Championship
2	MC Alger	22	10	10	2	32	17	+15	52	
3	RS Alger	22	11	8	3	24	21	+3	52	
4	GS Alger	22	11	5	6	0	0	0	49	
5	RU Alger	22	9	9	4	29	23	+6	49	
6	AS Saint Eugène	20	8	7	5	0	0	0	43	
7	AS Boufarik	21	8	6	7	0	0	0	43	
8	USM Blida	22	6	5	11	19	30	−11	39	
9	FC Blida	20	6	5	9	0	0	0	37	
10	RC Maison Carrée	22	5	4	13	0	0	0	36	
11	GS Orléansville	22	3	5	14	0	0	0	33	
12	USO Mitidja	22	2	7	13	0	0	0	33	Relegated to 1950–51 First Division

Source: L'Echo d'Alger
(C) Champions

==== Results by round ====
Round	1	2	3	4	5	6	7	8	9	10	11	12	13	14	15	16	17	18	19	20	21	22
Ground	A	H	A	A	H	H	A	H	A	H	H	H	A	H	H	A	A	H	A	H	A	A
Result	D	W	D	D	W	D	W	L	W	W	W	D	D	L	W	W	W	W	D	D	D	W
Position	7	4	3	5	7	7	5	8	6	4								2	2	2	2	2

Source: Competitive matches
A = Away; H = Home; W = Win; D = Draw; L = Loss

=== Matches ===
Win Draw Loss

14 September 1947 Round 1	AS Saint Eugène	0–0	MC Alger	Saint Eugène
		Report		Stadium: Stade Communal Saint Eugène
Note: Lineup for MC Alger - Abtouche, Hamoutène, Abdoun Mohamed, Khabatou, Abdelaoui, Hanoune, Tadjet, Kouar Sid Ahmed, Hahad, Deguigui, Benhamou Hamid

21 September 1947 Round 2	MC Alger	(w/o) (Note: MCA gagne sur Tapis vert, décision du 2.10.1947, L'OHD fait appel et obtient l'homologation du résultat sur décision de la FFF à Paris le 17.1.1948)	O Hussein Dey	Algiers
		Report
Note: Lineup for MC Alger - Abtouche, Hamoutène, Abdoun Mohamed, Tadjet, Abdelaoui, Benhamou Hamid, Derriche Merzak, Khabatou, Hahad, Kouar Sid Ahmed, Deguigui

4 October 1947 Round 3	GS Alger	0–0	MC Alger	Algiers
		Report		Stadium: Stade municipal
Note: Lineup for MC Alger - Abtouche, Hamoutène, Abdoun Mohamed, Khabatou, Tadjet, Benhamou Hamid, Ait Saâda Mohamed, Derriche Merzak, Hahad, Kouar Sid Ahmed, Deguigui

12 October 1947 Round 4	AS Boufarik	1–1	MC Alger	Boufarik
	Defrance	Report	Hahad 72'
Note: Lineup for MC Alger - Abtouche, Hamoutène, Abdoun Mohamed, Khabatou, Tadjet, Benhamou Hamid, Chelik, Derriche Merzak, Hahad, Kouar Sid Ahmed, Deguigui

19 October 1947 Round 5	MC Alger	P–P	GS Orléansville	Algiers

9 November 1947 Round 5	MC Alger	2–1	GS Orléansville	Saint Eugène
	Derriche Merzak 10'; Hahad 51'	Report	Albentoza 11'	Stadium: Stade Communal Saint Eugène; Referee: Delpech
Note: Lineup for MC Alger - Abtouche, Hamoutène, Khabatou, Kouar Sid Ahmed, Benhamou Hamid dit Hamid, Abdelaoui, Akliouat Hamid dit Hamid II, Deguigui, Chelik, Hahad, Derriche Merzak

16 November 1947 Round 6	MC Alger	P–P	RS Alger	Algiers
				Stadium: Stade municipal
Note: sur demande du GSO, pour le vote aux Élections Municipales

23 November 1947 Round 7	RC Maison Carrée	1–4	MC Alger	Maison Carré
	Roig	Report	Hahad 20', 50'; Bennour 40'; Deguigui 60'	Referee: Amar
Note: Lineup for MC Alger - btouche, Hamoutène, Khabatou, Akliouat Hamid dit Hamid II, Hanoune, Abdelaoui, Derriche Merzak, Kouar Sid Ahmed, Hahad, Basta Ali, Deguigui - Entraîneurs : Khabatou Smail et Akliouat Hamid

30 November 1947 Round 8	MC Alger	0–1	FC Blida	Saint Eugène
		Report	Samary 80'	Stadium: Stade Communal Saint Eugène
Note: Lineup for MC Alger - Abtouche, Hanoune, Tadjet, Abdelaoui, Khabatou, Benhamou Hamid, Derriche Merzak, Kouar Sid Ahmed, Hahad, Basta Ali, Deguigui - Entraîneurs : Khabatou Smail et Akliouat Hamid

14 December 1947 Round 9	USO Mitidja	0–1	MC Alger	El Affroun
		Report	Abdelaoui 15'
Note: Lineup for MC Alger - Ait Saâda, Hamoutène, Khabatou, Benhamou Hamid, Kouar Sid Ahmed, Hanoune, Bennour, Deguigui, Hahad, El Mehdaoui, Abdelaoui

21 December 1947 Round 10	MC Alger	1–0	RU Alger	Saint Eugène
	Hahad 30'			Stadium: Stade Communal Saint Eugène; Referee: Bocheciampe
Note: Lineup for MC Alger - Abtouche, Hamoutène, Khabatou, Benhamou Hamid, Bennour, Abdelaoui, Deguigui, El Mehdaoui, Tadjet, Kouar Sid Ahmed, Hahad

28 December 1947 Round 11	MC Alger	3–0	USM Blida	Saint Eugène
	Deguigui 17'; El Mahdaoui 62', 76'	Report		Stadium: Stade Communal Saint Eugène
Note: Lineup for MC Alger - Abtouche, Hamoutène, Khabatou, Kouar Sid Ahmed, Tadjet, Benhamou Hamid, Ait Saâda Mohamed, El Mehdaoui, Hahad, Abdelaoui, Deguigui

11 January 1948 Round 12	MC Alger	1–1	AS Saint Eugène	Algiers
	Deguigui 60'		Benet	Referee: Pelegrineschi
Note: Lineup for MC Alger - Abtouche, Hamoutène, Khabatou, Abdelaoui, Tadjet, Benhamou Hamid, Derriche Merzak, Basta Ali, Hahad, Kouar Sid Ahmed, Deguigui

31 January 1948 Round 13	O Hussein Dey	2–2	MC Alger	Maison Carré
	Belamine 80'; Fiol ?'		Hahad 55', 83'	Referee: Baroni
Note: Lineup for MC Alger - Abtouche, Hamoutène, Boudina, Khabatou, Bouzagou, Abdelaoui, Kouar, Hahad, Souissi, El Mehdaoui, Bouazaza

25 January 1948 Round 14	MC Alger	0–3	GS Alger	Saint Eugène
		Report	Mercadal ?'; Déleo ?', ?'	Stadium: Stade Communal Saint Eugène
Note: Lineup for MC Alger - Abtouche, Hamoutène, Khabatou, Abdelaoui, Benhamou Hamid, Akliouat Hamid dit Hamid II, Bensaid, El Mehdaoui, Derriche Merzak, Kouar Sid Ahmed, Hahad

1 February 1948 Round 15	MC Alger	2–1	AS Boufarik	Saint Eugène
	Deguigui 70'; Hamid Benhamou ?'	Report	Robert 5'	Stadium: Stade Communal Saint Eugène; Referee: Attanasio
Note: Lineup for MC Alger - Abtouche, Hamoutène, Khabatou, Benhamou Hamid, Abdelaoui, Akliouat Hamid dit Hamid II, Deguigui, Kouar Sid Ahmed, El Mehdaoui, Tadjet, Hahad

22 February 1948 Round 16	GS Orléansville	0–3	MC Alger	Orléansville
		Report	El Mehdaoui 10'; Ait Saâda 22'; Hahad 45'
Note: Lineup for MC Alger - Abtouche, Hamoutène, Khabatou, Souissi, Tadjet, Benhamou Hamid, Ait Saâda, El Mehdaoui, Hahad, Kouar Sid Ahmed, Deguigui

29 February 1948 Round 17	RS Alger	1–3	MC Alger	Algiers
	Ponceti 75'	Report	Abdelaoui 47'; El Mahdaoui 62'; Ait Saâda ?'	Referee: Rivieccio
Note: Lineup for MC Alger - Abtouche, Hamoutène, Khabatou, Abdelaoui, Tadjet, Benhamou Hamid, Ait Saâda Mohamed, El Mehdaoui, Hahad, Kouar Sid Ahmed, Deguigui

6 March 1947 Round 6	MC Alger	0–0	RS Alger	Saint Eugène
				Stadium: Stade Communal Saint Eugène
Note: Lineup for MC Alger - Abtouche, Hamoutène, Khabatou, Abdelaoui, Tadjet, Benhamou Hamid, Ait Saâda Mohamed, Hanoune, Hahad, Kouar Sid Ahmed, Deguigui

14 March 1948 Round 18	MC Alger	2–0	RC Maison Carrée	Saint Eugène
	Khabatou 63'; Hahad 81'	Report		Stadium: Stade Communal Saint Eugène; Referee: Todori
Note: Lineup for MC Alger - Abtouche, Hamoutène, Khabatou, Hanoune, Tadjet, Benhamou Hamid, Ait Saâda Mohamed, El Mehdaoui, Hahad, Kouar Sid Ahmed, Deguigui

21 March 1948 Round 19	FC Blida	1–1	MC Alger	Blida
	Antoine 80'	Report	Deguigui 30'	Referee: Rivieccio
Note: Lineup for MC Alger - Abtouche, Hamoutène, Khabatou, Abdelaoui, Tadjet, Benhamou Hamid, Ait Saâda Mohamed, Hanoune, Hahad, Kouar Sid Ahmed, Deguigui

4 April 1948 Round 20	MC Alger	0–0	USO Mitidja	Saint Eugène
				Stadium: Stade Communal Saint Eugène; Referee: Attanasio
Note: Lineup for MC Alger - Abtouche, Khabatou, Benhamou Hamid, Bouzagou (autre Source Kouar Omar dit Kouar II), Tadjet, Abdelaoui, Ait Saâda, Basta Ali, Hahad, Kouar Sid Ahmed, Deguigui

11 April 1948 Round 21	RU Alger	2–2	MC Alger	Algiers
	Faglin ?'; Danflous ?'	Report	Hahad 78', 86' (autre Source Kouar Sid Ahmed 86')	Stadium: Stade municipal
Note: Lineup for MC Alger - Abtouche, Khabatou, Hamoutène, Kouar Omar dit Kouar II, Tadjet, Abdelaoui, Basta Ali, Hahad, Kouar Sid Ahmed, Hanoune

18 April 1948 Round 22	USM Blida	2–4	MC Alger	Blida
	Zouraghi ?'; Chouiet ?'	Report	Hahad ?', ?'; Kouar Omar ?'; Deguigui ?'	Stadium: FCB Stadium
Note: Lineup for MC Alger - Abtouche, Hamoutène, Benhamou Hamid, Hanoune, Tadjet, Khabatou, Kouar Omar dit Kouar II, Basta Ali, Hahad, Kouar Sid Ahmed, Deguigui

== Forconi Cup ==
26 October 1947 Round of 32	ASPTT Alger	4–3	MC Alger	Algiers
	Ségui ?', ?'; Soubrecazes ?' (pen.); Babou; Boubekeur (red card)	Report	Hahad 10', Deguigui (3èm but), Tadjet, Derriche Merzak; Tadjet (red card)	Stadium: Stade municipal
Note: 30.10.1947 Le WA Boufarik éliminé au 2ème tour sur tapis vert par l'AS PTT, réserves sur les joueurs Bouricha et Benelfoul, a été rétabli dans son droit et déclaré qualifié après l'appel introduit, de ce fait le MCA a été autorisé à re-disputer ce tour le 16.11.1947 contre le vainqueur du match à rejouer WAB-Olympique Littoral, pour rappel ce dernier a été éliminé par l'AS PTT au 3èmeTour

16 November 1947 Round of 32	MC Alger	2–0	WA Boufarik	Algiers
	Hahad 10'; Derriche 35'	Report		Stadium: Stade municipal Referee: Rivieccio
Note: Lineup for MC Alger - Abtouche, Hamoutène, Khabatou, Abdelaoui, Hanoune, Kouar, Derriche Merzak, Benhamou Hamid, Deguigui, Akliouat Hamid dit Hamid II - Entraîneurs : Khabatou Smail et Akliouat Hamid

6 December 1947 Round of 16	MC Alger	1–0	Stade Guyotville	Algiers
	Khabatou 4'	Report		Stadium: Stade municipal Referee: Roméro

4 January 1948 Quarter-final	USM Alger	0–2	MC Alger	Algiers
14:00		Report	Hahad 49'; El Mahdaoui 64'	Stadium: Stade municipal
Note: Lineup for MC Alger - Abtouche, Hamoutène, Khabatou, Abdelaoui, Tadjet, Benhamou Hamid, Ait Saâda Mohamed, El Mehdaoui, Hahad, Kouar Sid Ahmed, Deguigui

30 May 1948 Semi-final	MC Alger	2–0	O Hussein Dey	Algiers
	Deguigui 16'; Ait Saâda 75'	Report		Stadium: Stade municipal Referee: Baroni
Note: Lineup for MC Alger - Abtouche, Hamoutène, Benhamou Hamid, Abdelaoui, Tadjet, Kouar Omar dit Kouar II, Ait Saâda, Khabatou, Kouar Sid Ahmed, Deguigui

3 June 1948 Final	MC Alger	5–3 (a.e.t.)	AS Saint Eugène	Algiers
15:00	Hahad 19'; Ait Saâda 57', 91', 120'; Kouar 72'		Rivas ?'; De Villeneuve ?', ?'	Stadium: Stade de Saint-Eugène
Note: Lineup for MC Alger - Abtouche, Hamoutène, Kouar Omar dit Kouar II, Abdelaoui, Tadjet, Benhamou Hamid, Ait Saâda Mohamed, Khabatou, Hahad, Kouar Sid Ahmed, Deguigui

== North African Championship ==
15 February 1948 Round of 16	US Meknès	2–1	MC Alger	Casablanca, Morocco
	Lafaye 40'; Martinez		Kouar Sid Ahmed 42' (pen.)	Stadium: Stade Philip; Referee: Bendjadi (Oran)
Note: Lineup for MC Alger - Abtouche, Hamoutène, Khabatou, Abdelaoui, Tadjet, Benhamou Hamid, Hahad, Bennour, El Mehdaoui, Kouar Sid Ahmed, Deguigui

== Squad information ==
=== Playing statistics ===
Pos.	Name	Division Honneur		Forconi Cup		North African Championship		Total	
Pos.	Name	Apps	Goals	Apps	Goals	Apps	Goals	Apps	Goals
GK	(Algeria) Abtouche	0	0	3	0	1	0	0	0
DF	(Algeria) Smaïl Khabatou	0	0	3	0	1	0	0	0
FW	(Algeria) Omar Hahad	0	0	2	2	1	0	0	0
	(Algeria) Abderahmane Deguigui	0	0	3	1	1	0	0	0
	(Algeria) Mohamed Ait Saâda	0	0	3	4	0	0	0	0
	(Algeria) Hocine El Mahdaoui	0	0	1	1	1	0	0	0
	(Algeria) Merzak Derriche	0	0	0	0	0	0	0	0
	(Algeria) Abdelkader Bouzera as Abdelaoui	0	0	3	0	1	0	0	0
	(Algeria) Kouar Sid Ahmed	0	0	3	0	1	1	0	0
	(Algeria) Kouar Omar	0	0	2	0	0	0	0	0
	(Algeria) Hassen Bennour	0	0	0	0	1	0	0	0
	(Algeria) Hamid Benhamou	0	0	3	0	1	0	0	0
	(Algeria) Hamoutène	0	0	3	0	1	0	0	0
	(Algeria) Tadjet	0	0	3	0	1	0	0	0
	(Algeria)	0	0	0	0	0	0	0	0
	(Algeria)	0	0	0	0	0	0	0	0
	(Algeria)	0	0	0	0	0	0	0	0
	(Algeria)	0	0	0	0	0	0	0	0
	(Algeria)	0	0	0	0	0	0	0	0
	(Algeria)	0	0	0	0	0	0	0	0
Totals		-	0	-	9	-	1	-	0

=== Goalscorers ===
Includes all competitive matches. The list is sorted alphabetically by surname when total goals are equal.

Nat.	Player	Pos.	DH	FC	NAC	TOTAL
(Algeria)	Omar Hahad	FW	13	3	0	16
(Algeria)	Abderahmane Deguigui		6	1	0	7
(Algeria)	Mohamed Ait Saâda		2	4	0	6
(Algeria)	Hocine El Mahdaoui		4	1	0	5
(Algeria)	Merzak Derriche		1	1	0	2
(Algeria)	Smaïl Khabatou	DF	1	1	0	2
(Algeria)	Abdelkader Bouzera as Abdelaoui		2	0	0	2
(Algeria)	Kouar Sid Ahmed		0	1	1	2
(Algeria)	Kouar Omar		1	0	0	1
(Algeria)	Hassen Bennour		1	0	0	1
(Algeria)	Hamid Benhamou		1	0	0	1
Own Goals			0	0	0	0
Totals			32	12	1	45
