= 1949–50 USM Blida season =

USM Blida
1949–50 season
- President: Hamid Kassoul
- Head coach: Mohamed Khelifa
- Stadium: FCB Stadium
- Division Honneur: 8th
- Forconi Cup: Fifth Round
- Top goalscorer: League: Sid Ali Mahieddine (8); All: Sid Ali Mahieddine (9)
Home colours

In the 1949–50 season, USM Blida competed in the Division Honneur for the 17th season French colonial era, as well as the Forconi Cup.

== Pre-season ==
Win Draw Loss

10 September 1949	FC Blida	6–2	USM Blida	Blida
	Mesbah; Yahia; Ruiz	(4-2); Report	Lekhal; Boumendjel	Stadium: FCB Stadium
Note: Friendly

17 September 1949	USM Blida	3–0	AS Boufarik	Blida
	Benelfoul; Bob	Report		Stadium: FCB Stadium
Note: Friendly

== Friendly ==
30 October 1949	SC Bel Abbès	0–3	USM Blida	Sidi Bel Abbès
		Report		Stadium: Paul André
Note: Friendly

1 November 1949	USM Oran	3–1	USM Blida	Oran
		Report		Stadium: Vincent Monréal; Referee: Martin
Note: Friendly

15 January 1950	AS Orléansville	2–1	USM Blida	Orléansville
		Report		Stadium: Stade Joseph Robert
Note: Friendly

2 April 1950	USM Blida	0–0	USM Bel Abbès	Blida
		Report
Note: Friendly (Coupe JOB)

== Competitions ==
=== Overview ===
Competition	Record								Started round	Final position / round	First match	Last match
Competition	G	W	D	L	GF	GA	GD	Win %	Started round	Final position / round	First match	Last match
Division Honneur	22	6	9	7	29	28	+1	27.27	—N/a	8th	25 September 1949	14 May 1950
Forconi Cup	2	1	0	1	5	4	+1	50.00	4th Round	5th Round	6 November 1949	4 December 1949
Total	24	7	9	8	34	32	+2	29.17				

Updated to match played 14 May 1950
Source: Competitions

=== Division Honneur ===
==== League table ====
Pos	Team	Pld	W	D	L	GF	GA	GD	Pts	Qualification or relegation
1	O Hussein Dey (C)	22	13	4	5	36	20	+16	52	Qualified for North African Championship
2	AS Saint Eugène	22	13	3	6	44	28	+16	51	
3	GS Alger	22	12	4	6	31	17	+14	50	
4	FC Blidéen	22	11	4	7	30	24	+6	48	
5	S.Guyotville	22	9	8	5	26	26	0	48	
6	MC Alger	22	6	10	6	23	23	0	44	
7	RS Alger	22	7	7	8	29	31	−2	43	
8	USM Blida	22	6	9	7	33	30	+3	43	
9	AS Boufarik	22	8	4	10	30	29	+1	42	
10	RU Alger	22	8	4	10	26	30	−4	42	
11	USO Mitidja	22	3	5	14	21	47	−26	33	Relegated to 1950–51 First Division
12	RC Maison Carrée	22	2	6	14	20	43	−23	32	Relegated to 1950–51 First Division

Source: published in "L'Echo d'Alger", dated Monday 15 May 1950.
(C) Champions

=== Results summary ===
Overall								Home						Away					
Pld	W	D	L	GF	GA	GD	Pts	W	D	L	GF	GA	GD	W	D	L	GF	GA	GD
22	6	9	7	29	28	+1	27	4	6	1	18	9	+9	2	3	6	11	19	−8

Last updated: 5 April 2020.
Source: Competitive matches

=== Results by round ===
Round	1	2	3	4	5	6	7	8	9	10	11	12	13	14	15	16	17	18	19	20	21	22
Ground	A	A	H	H	A	H	A	H	A	A	A	H	H	A	A	H	A	H	A	H	H	H
Result	L	D	D	D	D	L	W	D	L	L	W	W	D	L	L	D	L	W	D	W	W	D
Position	10	10	6	7				10	10	10												8

Updated to match(es) played on 14 May 1950. Source: Competitive matches
A = Away; H = Home; W = Win; D = Draw; L = Loss

=== Matches ===
Win Draw Loss

25 September 1949 Round 1	RU Alger	4–2	USM Blida	Algiers
	Loison Hugues 16', 29'; Daube 27' Kespite, Brouillet, Bouvier, Rochet, Vidal, Faglin, Figuières, Jasseron, Daube, Gambarutti, Louison	Report	Bekhoucha Raouti 1'; Benelfoul 55' Meradi, Reguieg, Zouakou, Bekhoucha Raouti, Madoudou, Zouraghi, Benelfoul, Hadji, Mahieddine, Brakni, Lekhal	Referee: Garofalo

2 October 1949 Round 2	RC Maison-Carré	2–2	USM Blida	Maison Carré
	Picot 30'; Molinier 35' Dura, Maziz, Roux, Khabatou, Boutria, Tallis, Molinier, Picot, Marcelin, Juanéda, Segui	Report	Mahieddine 15'; Hadji 80' Meradi, Reguieg, Bouguerra, Zouakou, Bekhoucha Raouti, Madoudou, Benelfoul, Hadji, Mahieddine, Zouraghi, Brakni

9 October 1949 Round 3	USM Blida	2–2	US Ouest Mitidja	Blida
	Hadji 24'; Mahieddine 38' Menacer, Mansouri, Bouguerra, Reguieg, Zouraghi, Madoudou, Lekhal, Hadji, Mahieddine, Benelfoul, Bekhoucha Raouti	Report	Ratto 36' 60' Manchon, Rouquièr, Hubert, Defnet, Saes, Schmidt, Andrada, Lamri, Ratto, Bottaro, Ribès	Stadium: FCB Stadium; Referee: Baroni

16 October 1949 Round 4	USM Blida	2–2	AS Saint Eugène	Blida
	Mahieddine 1' (30s); Lekhal 40' Menacer, Mansouri, Zouakou, Reguieg, Bekhoucha Raouti, Zouraghi, Chalane, Lekhal, Laidi, Benelfoul, Mahieddine	Report	Rivas 5'; De Vilieneuve 50' Fortin, Aboubeker, Vidal, Stépanoff, Bérenguer, Berrah, Rivas, De Vilieneuve, Castaldi, Salem, Olivier	Stadium: FCB Stadium; Referee: Graziano

23 October 1949 Round 5	MC Alger	1–1	USM Blida	Algiers
	Aliane 5' Belahcène, Hamoutène, Kouar Omar dit Kouar II, Benhamou Hamid, Deguigui, Bennour, Khelil, Hahad, Bouhired Mustapha, Lekhal Aoued, Aliane	Report	Mahieddine 29' Menacer, Reguieg, Mansouri, Zouakou, Benelfoul, Bekhoucha Raouti, Laïdi, Chalane, Mahieddine, Zouraghi, Lekhal	Referee: Attanasio

13 November 1949 Round 6	USM Blida	0–1	Stade Guyotville	Blida
	Menacer, Zerrouki, Mansouri, Zouakou, Bouguerra, Reguieg, Ferfera Zerrouk, Zouraghi, Mahieddine, Hadji, Benelfoul	Report	Kébladj 33' Zaidi, Valence, Ballester I, Giorgetti, Ciofi, De Pasquale, Chamrésy, Ballester II, Vitieollo, Kébladj, Gélabert Michel	Stadium: FCB Stadium; Referee: Belkessa

20 November 1949 Round 7	AS Boufarik	0–1	USM Blida	Boufarik
	Cohen, Massip A., Massib M, Alzina, Vicedo, Massa, Radegonde, Gotvallès, Defrance, Navarro Valentin, Briones	Report	Zouraghi 10' Menacer, Zerrouki, Madoudou, Mansouri, Bouguerra, Reguieg, Hadji, Zouraghi, Benelfoul, Mahieddine, Chalane

27 November 1949 Round 8	USM Blida	1–1	FC Blida	Blida
	Chalane 85' Menacer, Zerrouki, Mansouri, Reguieg, Bouguerra, Zouraghi, Benelfoul, Hadji, Mahieddine, Madoudou, Chalane	Report	Camand 36' Machtoun Bachelu, Garinos, Pons, Haddad Lakhder, Riéra, Sicart, Camand, Giner, Meftah, Ruiza	Stadium: FCB Stadium; Referee: Suanez

11 December 1949 Round 9	RS Alger	2–1	USM Blida	Algiers
	Maouch 40'; Buffard 59' Diehl, Sadi, Caillat, Vermeuil, Magliozzi, Senane Ali, Maouch, Ponsetti, Buffard, Ghanem, Zerapha	Report; Report	Benelfoul 2' Menacer, Reguieg, Mansouri, Madoudou, Benelfoul, Zouraghi, Chalane, Hadji, Mahieddine, Bouguerra, Brakni	Referee: Graziani

18 December 1949 Round 10	GS Alger	3–0	USM Blida	Algiers
	Fortuné 19'; Calmus Roger 60'; Lekhal 85' (o.g.) Testa, Principato Fernand, Guorgue, Ferassen, Montel, Torrès, Calmus Roger, Déléo Roger, Gay André, Biton, Fortuné	Report	Menacer, Reguieg, Mansouri, Zerrouki; Bouguerra, Zouraghi, Chalane, Benelfoul, Mahieddine, Hadji, Lekhal	Stadium: Stade Municipal; Attendance: 3.000; Referee: Rivieccio

25 December 1949 Round 11	O Hussein Dey	0–1	USM Blida	Hussein Dey
	Vadel, Montevani, Santiago, Fiol, Ouzifi, Serrano, Scriba, Fez, Belamine, Sintès, Perret	Report; Report	Mahieddine 35' Menacer, Reguieg, Bouguerra, Madoudou, Zouraghi, Bekhoucha Raouti, Chalane, Mahieddine, Benelfoul, Hadji, Lekhal	Attendance: 2.000; Referee: Derradji

29 January 1950 Round 12	USM Blida	2–1	RU Alger	Blida
	Lekhal 15'; Mahieddine 87' Meradi, Bouguerra, Madoudou, Zouraghi, Reguieg, Bekhoucha Raouti, Hadji, Chalane, Lekhal, Benelfoul, Mahieddine	Report	Figuière 65' Kespite, Vidal, Luc, Brouillet, Jasseron, Rochet, Figuière, Gambaruti, Baylé I, Lorenzo, Baylé II	Stadium: FCB Stadium; Referee: Giner

12 February 1950 Round 13	USM Blida	1–1	RC Maison-Carré	Blida
	Chalane 30' Meradi, Reguieg, Bekhoucha Raouti, Bouguerra, Madoudou, Zouraghi, Mahieddine, Benelfoul, Hadji, Chalane, Lekhal	Report; Report	Segui 22' Dura, Maziz, Bourria, Sellal, Di Martino, Khabatou, Segui, Roux, Picot, Juaneda, Gonzalves	Stadium: FCB Stadium; Referee: Soltana

26 February 1950 Round 14	US Ouest Mitidja	2–0	USM Blida	El Affroun
	Schmidt 62'; Saès 86' Garcia, Andrada, Schmidt, Defnet, Mencagli, Gaillard, Gaston, Si Amar, Talbi, Saès, Achour, Maranelli	Report	Menacer, Bouguerra, Reguieg, Bekhoucha Raouti, Mansouri, Zouraghi, Madoudou, Chalane, Hadji, Mahieddine, Khelifat	Referee: Caratino

12 March 1950 Round 15	AS Saint Eugène	3–2	USM Blida	Saint Eugène
	Castaldi 5'; Bekhoucha Raouti 50' (o.g.); Bindinelli 68' Schneider, Stépanoff, Oliver, Aboulker, Castaldi, De Villeneuve, Brouel, Salem, Collonge, Bendinelli, Rivas	Report	Mahieddine 26'; Mansouri 86' (25m) Menacer, Chalane, Madoudou, Bekhoucha Raouti; Mansouri, Bouguerra; Reguieg, Hadji, Mahieddine, Lekhal, Khelifat	Referee: Di Miglio

19 March 1950 Round 16	USM Blida	1–1	MC Alger	Blida
	Mansouri Menacer, Reguieg, Madoudou, Bouguerra, Mansouri, Zerrouki, Laidi, Hadji, Brakni, Zouraghi, Khelifat	Report	Hahad Belahcène, Abdelaoui, Hamid, Kouar I, Deguigui, Benour, Aliane, Hahad, Bouir, Lekhal, Azef	Stadium: FCB Stadium

26 March 1950 Round 17	Stade Guyotville	2–0	USM Blida	Guyotville
15:30	Cuba A 20'; Vitiello 85' Zaidi, Sabouraud, De Pasquale, Valence, Gilabet, Cioffi, Cuba, Ballester P, Vitiello, Cambresy, Giorgetti	Report	Menacer, Zerrouki, Bekhoucha Raouti, Mansouri, Madoudou, Chalane, Zouraghi, Hadji, Brakni, Bouguerra, Khelifat	Referee: Rivieccio

9 April 1950 Round 18	USM Blida	5–0	AS Boufarik	Blida
	Chalane 8'; Mazouz 48', 84'; Hadji 75', 83' Menacer, Reguieg, Zouraghi, Madoudou, Mansouri, Bouguerra, Chalane, Hadji, Bekhoucha Raouti, Benelfoul, Mazouz	Report	Gervais, Massip I, Vicedo, Chazot, Massat, Gotvalès, Vomero, Yacoubi, Massip II, Pérez, Brionès	Stadium: FCB Stadium

23 April 1950 Round 19	FC Blida	0–0	USM Blida	Blida
	Rosens, Bachelu, Pons, Guasq, Haddad Lakhder, Riéra, Ruiz, Guarinos, Meftah, Pelegrini, Rhais	Report	Menacer, Reguieg, Mansouri, Bouguerra, Bekhoucha Raouti, Zouraghi, Benelfoul, Hadji, Mahieddine, Chalane, Mazouz	Stadium: FCB Stadium; Referee: Lapasset

30 April 1950 Round 20	USM Blida	2–0	RS Alger	Blida
	Hadji 70'; Mahieddine 75' Menacer, Mansouri, Bouguerra, Bekhoucha Raouti, Madoudou, Zouraghi, Benelfoul, Chalane, Mahieddine, Hadji, Mazouz	Report	Amadéo, Senane, Caillat, Magliozzi, Ghanem, Sadi, Maouche, Buffard, Vermeuil, Ponsetti, Kettab	Stadium: FCB Stadium; Referee: Graziani

7 May 1950 Round 21	USM Blida	3–0	GS Alger	Blida
	Mazouz 5'; Benelfoul 60'; Bekhoucha Raouti 80' Menacer, Bekhoucha Raouti, Mansouri, Bouguerra, Madoudou, Zouraghi, Benelfoul, Hadji, Mahieddine, Chalane, Mazouz	Report	Testa, Fortuné, Ferrasse, Principato, Torrès, Calmus Roger, Fiorentino, Bagur, Giono, Calmus II, Biton	Stadium: FCB Stadium; Referee: Attanasio

14 May 1950 Round 22	USM Blida	0–0	O Hussein Dey	Blida
	Erhard, Montovani, Santiago, Fiol, Gomez, Fès, Sintès, Ouzifi, Mouzarine, Belhamine, Scriba	Report	Menacer, Reguieg, Mansouri, Bekhoucha Raouti, Zouraghi, Madoudou, Mazouz, Chalane, Mahieddine, Hadji, Benelfoul	Stadium: FCB Stadium; Referee: Depeuch

== Forconi Cup ==
6 November 1949 Fourth Round	USM Blida	2–0	ASPTT Alger	Boufarik
14:30	Reguieg 46'; Biffano (o.g.) Menacer, Mansouri, Bouguerra, Reguieg; Zerrouki, Zouakou, Zouraghi; Hadji, Benelfoul, Mahieddine, Lekhal	Report	Pertus, Biffano, Carlhian, Richard, Benamar, Mousica, Segui, Madani, Blanès, Bolufer, Schmitz	Stadium: Boufarik Stadium; Referee: Garofalo, March & Saleh

4 December 1949 Fifth Round	GS Alger	4–3	USM Blida	Maison-Carré
14:30	Giono 5', 44'; Deléo 40'; Torrès 76' Testa, Ferrane, Belmonte, Fortuné, Torrès, Calmus Robert, Biton, Calmus Roger, Giono, Bagur, Déléo	Report	Chalane 30'; Mahieddine 51'; Lekhal 53' Menacer, Mansouri, Reguieg, Bouguerra; Zouakou, Zouraghi; Brakni, Lekhal, Mahieddine, Chalane, Benelfoul	Referee: M. Carratino

== Squad statistics ==
Pos.	Name	Division Honneur																						Forconi Cup		Total
Pos.	Name	1	2	3	4	5	6	7	8	9	10	11	12	13	14	15	16	17	18	19	20	21	22	1	2	Total
GK	(Algeria) Menacer			X	X	X	X	X	X	X	X	X			X	X	X	X	X	X	X	X	X	X	X	20
GK	(Algeria) Meradi	X	X										X	X												4
DF	(Algeria) Reguieg	X	X	X	X	X	X	X	X	X	X	X	X	X	X	X	X		X	X			X	X	X	21
DF	(Algeria) Bouguerra		X	X			X	X	X	X	X	X	X	X	X	X	X	X	X	X	X	X		X	X	20
DF	(Algeria) Mansouri			X	X	X	X	X	X	X	X				X	X	X	X	X	X	X	X	X	X	X	19
DF	(Algeria) Bekhoucha Raouti	X	X	X	X	X						X	X	X	X	X		X	X	X	X	X	X			17
DF	(Algeria) Zerrouki						X	X	X		X						X	X						X		7
MF	(Algeria) Zouraghi	X	X	X	X	X	X	X	X	X	X	X	X	X	X		X	X	X	X	X	X	X	X	X	23
MF	(Algeria) Madoudou	X	X	X				X	X	X		X	X	X	X	X	X	X	X		X	X	X			17
MF	(Algeria) Zouakou	X	X		X	X	X																	X	X	7
MF	(Algeria) Brakni	X	X							X							X	X							X	6
MF	(Algeria) Laidi				X	X											X									3
FW	(Algeria) Mahieddine	X	X	X	X	X	X	X	X	X	X	X	X	X	X	X				X	X	X	X	X	X	21
FW	(Algeria) Hadji	X	X	X			X	X	X	X	X	X	X	X	X	X	X	X	X	X	X	X	X	X		21
FW	(Algeria) Benelfoul	X	X	X	X	X	X	X	X	X	X	X	X	X					X	X	X	X	X	X	X	20
FW	(Algeria) Chalane				X	X		X	X	X	X	X	X	X	X	X		X	X	X	X	X	X		X	18
FW	(Algeria) Lekhal	X		X	X	X					X	X	X	X		X								X	X	11
FW	(Algeria) Mazouz																		X	X	X	X	X			5
FW	(Algeria) Khelifa														X	X	X	X								4
FW	(Algeria) Ferfera						X																			1

== Players statistics ==
Statistics for 21 games only and 1 games does Its figures.

No.	Pos	Nat	Player	Total		League Algiers		Forconi Cup	
No.	Pos	Nat	Player	Apps	Goals	Apps	Goals	Apps	Goals
Goalkeepers
	GK	(Algeria) ALG	Abderrahmane Menacer	20	0	18	0	2	0
	GK	(Algeria) ALG	Abdelaziz Meradi	4	0	4	0	0	0
Defenders
	DF	(Algeria) ALG	Ali Reguieg	21	1	19	0	2	1
	DF	(Algeria) ALG	Belkacem Bouguerra II	20	0	18	0	2	0
	DF	(Algeria) ALG	Ali Mansouri	19	0	17	0	2	0
	DF	(Algeria) ALG	Bekhoucha Raouti	17	2	17	2	0	0
	DF	(Algeria) ALG	Rabah Zerrouki	7	0	6	0	1	0
Midfielders
	MF	(Algeria) ALG	Mahmoud Zouraghi	23	1	21	1	2	0
	MF	(Algeria) ALG	Mohamed Madoudou	17	0	17	0	0	0
	MF	(Algeria) ALG	Ahmed Zouakou	7	0	5	0	2	0
	MF	(Algeria) ALG	Braham Brakni	6	0	5	0	1	0
	FW	(Algeria) ALG	Mustapha Laïdi	3	0	3	0	0	0
Forwards
	FW	(Algeria) ALG	Sid Ali Mahieddine	21	5	19	4	2	1
	FW	(Algeria) ALG	Rachid Hadji	21	2	20	2	1	0
	FW	(Algeria) ALG	Ahmed Benelfoul (c)	20	2	18	2	2	0
	FW	(Algeria) ALG	Belkacem Chalane	18	3	17	2	1	1
	FW	(Algeria) ALG	Abdelkrim Lekhal	11	2	9	1	2	1
	FW	(Algeria) ALG	Abdelkader Mazouz	5	0	5	0	0	0
	FW	(Algeria) ALG	Mohamed Khelifa	4	0	4	0	0	0
	FW	(Algeria) ALG	Zerrouk Ferfera	1	0	1	0	0	0

=== Goalscorers ===
Includes all competitive matches. The list is sorted alphabetically by surname when total goals are equal.

Nat.	Player	Pos.	DH	FC	TOTAL
(Algeria)	Sid Ali Mahieddine	FW	8	1	9
(Algeria)	Rachid Hadji	MF	6	0	6
(Algeria)	Belkacem Chalane	FW	3	1	4
(Algeria)	Ahmed Benelfoul	MF	3	0	3
(Algeria)	Mohamed Lekhal	FW	2	1	3
(Algeria)	Ali Mansouri	DF	2	0	2
(Algeria)	Abdelkader Mazouza	FW	2	0	2
(Algeria)	Bekhoucha Raouti	DF	2	0	2
(Algeria)	Reguieg	DF	0	1	1
(Algeria)	Mahmoud Zouraghi	MF	1	0	1
Own Goals			0	1	1
Totals			29	5	34

== Transfers ==
=== In ===
Pos	Player	From club
MF	Mohamed Madoudou	US Blida
DF	Bekhoucha Raouti	US Blida
DF	Belkacem Bouguerra	
FW	Belkacem Chalane	

=== Out ===
Pos	Player	From club
	Kaddour Bensamet	FRA Stade Français
	Mohamed Imcaoudène as Bob	
	Soum Yahia Benyoucef	US Ouest Mitidja
