= 1951–52 USM Marengo season =

USM Marengo
1951–52 season
- President: Sid Ali Embarek
- Head coach: Lopez
- Stadium: Stade Municipal de Marengo
- Division Honneur: 12th
- Forconi Cup: Fifth Round
- Top goalscorer: League: Ferhat (10 goals); All: Ferhat (10 goals)

In the 1951–52 season, USM Marengo is competing in the Division Honneur for the 1st season French colonial era, as well as the Forconi Cup. They competing in Division Honneur, and the Forconi Cup.

== Pre-season and friendlies ==
9 September 1951 Tournois amicaux	USM Marengo	1–0	USM Blida	Marengo
	Ferhat ?'	Report		Stadium: Stade Municipal de Marengo

== Competitions ==
=== Overview ===
Competition	Record								Started round	Final position / round	First match	Last match
Competition	G	W	D	L	GF	GA	GD	Win %	Started round	Final position / round	First match	Last match
Division Honneur	22	3	5	14	24	56	−32	13.64	—N/a	12th	16 September 1951	27 April 1952
Forconi Cup	2	1	0	1	5	2	+3	50.00	Fourth Round	Fifth Round	4 November 1951	2 December 1951
Total	24	4	5	15	29	58	−29	16.67				

=== Division Honneur ===
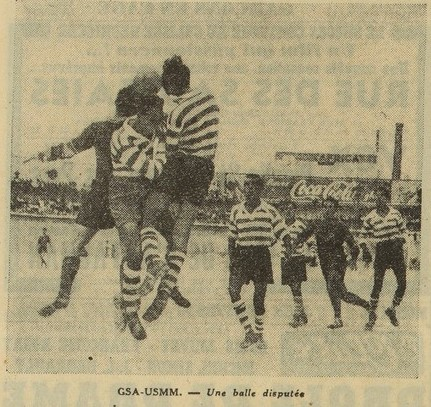
The opening match of the 1951–52 League Algiers season between GS Alger and USM Marengo at Stade municipal.

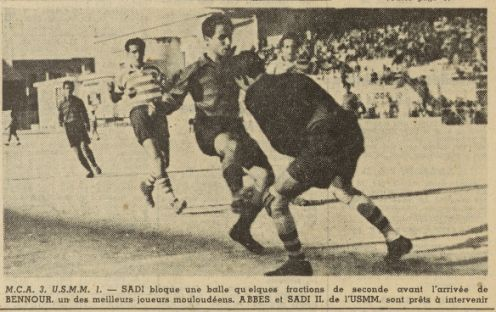
Match between MC Alger and USM Marengo at Stade Communal de Saint Eugène.

==== League table ====
Pos	Team	Pld	W	D	L	GF	GA	GD	Pts	Qualification or relegation
1	AS Saint Eugène (C)	22	8	13	1	43	24	+19	51	Qualified for North African Championship
2	MC Alger	22	9	10	3	34	30	+4	50	
3	RS Alger	22	10	7	5	32	35	−3	49	
4	O Hussein Dey	22	11	4	7	45	33	+12	48	
5	AS Boufarik	22	8	8	6	39	41	−2	45 (Note: 1 point deducted?)	
6	FC Blidéen	22	8	8	6	52	32	+20	45	
7	RU Alger	22	7	7	8	27	31	−4	43	
8	S.Guyotville	22	5	10	7	30	32	−2	42	
9	GS Orléansville	22	6	7	9	38	41	−3	41	
10	USM Blida	22	6	7	9	28	30	−2	41	
11	GS Alger	22	4	8	10	32	44	−12	38	Relegated to 1952–53 First Division
12	USM Marengo	22	4	3	15	24	55	−31	33	Relegated to 1952–53 First Division

(C) Champions

==== Results by round ====
Round	1	2	3	4	5	6	7	8	9	10	11	12	13	14	15	16	17	18	19	20	21	22
Ground	A	H	A	H	A	H	A	H	A	H	A	H	A	H	A	H	A	H	A	H	A	H
Result	D	D	L	D	L	L	L	L	W	W	L	W	L	W	L	L	L	L	L	L	L	L
Position							12		11	11	12	11						12	12	12	12	12

Updated to match(es) played on 27 April 1952. Source: Competitive matches
A = Away; H = Home; W = Win; D = Draw; L = Loss

=== Matches ===
Win Draw Loss

16 September 1951 Round 1	GS Alger	1–1	USM Marengo	Belcourt
	Fortuné 57'	Report	Abbés 50'	Stadium: Stade municipal Referee: Riveccio
Note: Lineup for USM Marengo - Saadi Abdelkader, Djelfi, Saadi Ali, Moussaoui, Boukalfa, Semane, Abdette, Hocine, Touhami, Abbés, Ferhat. Lineup for GS Alger - Pellegrino, Fortuné, Belmonte, Ferrasse, Torrés, Deléo, Bagur.F, Azef, Cerdan, Lando, Ferrer.

23 September 1951 Round 2	USM Marengo	1–1	AS Saint Eugène	Marengo
	Abbés ?'	Report	Vidal 20'	Stadium: Stade Municipal de Marengo; Referee: Attanasio
Note: Lineup for USM Marengo - Saadi Abdelkader, Djelfi, Boukalfa, Saadi Ali, Abbés, Ferhat, Hocine, Semane, Lopez, Bouchane, Zemmouri. Lineup for AS Saint Eugène - Boubeker, Oliver, Bérenguer, Aboulker, Aouadj, Valenza, Alarcon, Boret, Collogues, Baesa, Vidal.

30 September 1951 Round 3	RS Alger	2–0	USM Marengo	Belcourt
	Zaibek 60'; Maouch 84'	Report		Stadium: Stade municipal Referee: Graziani
Note: Lineup for USM Marengo - Saadi Abdelkader, Djelfi, Abbés, Touhami, Moussaoui, Saadi Ali, Semane, Boukalfa, Hocine, Abdette, Ferhat. Lineup for RS Alger - Dielh, Vermeuil, Caillat, Mayens, Zérapha, Magliozzi, Maouche, Sadi, Meslin, Zaïbek, Belhadj.

7 October 1951 Round 4	USM Marengo	2–2	Stade Guyotville	Marengo
	Ferhat 40', 60'	Report	? ?'; Ballester 80'	Stadium: Stade Municipal de Marengo; Referee: Izzo
Note: Lineup for USM Marengo - Saadi Abdelkader, Djelfi, Saadi Ali, Maroc 2, Boukalfa, Moussaoui, Ferhat, Bouanem, Abbés, Abdette, Touhami. Lineup for Stade Guyotville - Zaidi, Gélabert, Ballester V, Ballester P, Bénéjean, Liorens, Errera, Valence, Vitiello, Camprésy, Georgetti.

14 October 1951 Round 5	USM Blida	2–1	USM Marengo	Blida
	Mahieddine 55'; Darhmane 70'	Report	Ferhat 50'	Stadium: FCB Stadium; Attendance: 1.700; Referee: Garofalo
Note: Lineup for USM Marengo - Saadi Abdelkader, Djelfi, Moussaoui, Ferhat, Saadi Ali, Boukalfa, Bouanem, Maroc 2, Abdette, Abbés, Touhami. Lineup for USM Blida - Menacer, Bekhoucha, Madoudou, Chalane, Mansouri, Zouraghi, Mazouz, Dahmane, Mahieddine, Hadji, Brakni.

21 October 1951 Round 6	USM Marengo	1–4	RU Alger	Marengo
	Hocine 40'	Report	Ferrari 55', ?', ?'; Faglin 63'	Stadium: Stade Municipal de Marengo; Referee: Derradji
Note: Lineup for USM Marengo - Saadi Abdelkader, Djelfi, Boukalfa, Daidi, Saadi Ali, Moussaoui, Hocine, Touhami, Abbés, Abdette, Ferhat. Lineup for RU Alger - Laviognat, Bouvier, Rocher, Brouillet, Jasseron, Florit, Ferrari, Lorenzo, Friand, Faglin, Haffar.

28 October 1951 Round 7	MC Alger	3–1	USM Marengo	Saint Eugène
14:55	? ?' ? ?'; Khabatou 85'	Report	? ?'	Stadium: Stade Communal de Saint Eugène; Referee: Giner
Note: Lineup for USM Marengo - Saadi Abdelkader, Djelfi, Moussaoui, Abbés, Boukalfa, Hocine, Saadi Ali, Bouanem, Abdette, Baya, Ferhat. Lineup for MC Alger - Zebairi, Hamoutène, Kouar Sid Ahmed dit Kouar I, Abdelaoui, Oualiken Mohamed, Benhamou Hamid, Hahad, Bennour, Khabatou, Dahmoune Abdeldjalil, Ait Saâda.

18 November 1951 Round 8	USM Marengo	0–2	GS Orléansville	Marengo
		Report		Stadium: Stade Municipal de Marengo
Note: Lineup for USM Marengo - , , , , , , , , , , .

25 November 1951 Round 9	AS Boufarik	1–2	USM Marengo	Boufarik
	Navarro 60'	Report	Abbés 75'; Touhami 89'	Referee: Escudero
Note: Lineup for USM Marengo - Saadi Abdelkader, Djelfi, Saidi, Baya, Boukalfa, Moussaoui, Abbés, Saadi Ali, Touhami, Ferhat, Bouanem. Lineup for AS Boufarik - Gervais, Massip, Vicédo, Amiel, Massat, Benelfoul, Vomero, Reichert, Navarro.A, Saib, Navarro.V.

9 December 1951 Round 10	USM Marengo	2–1	FC Blidéen	Marengo
	Ferhat 24'; Abbés 27'	Report	Caman 15'	Stadium: Stade Municipal de Marengo; Referee: Abdelaziz Chekaïmi
Note: Lineup for USM Marengo - Saadi Abdelkader, Djelfi, Saadi Ali, Baya, Boukalfa, Ferhat, Moussaoui, Abbés, Semane, Touhami, Gueddouche. Lineup for FC Blidéen - Cano, Giner, Meftah, Sicard, Maccherazo, Mazoni, Torrés.M, Ruiz, Raïs, Batiat, Caman.

23 December 1951 Round 11	O Hussein Dey	4–0	USM Marengo	Hussein Dey
	Mas 20', ?'; Serrano 40', 80'	Report		Stadium: Stade Communal de Hussein Dey; Referee: Boukhouas (League of Tunisia)
Note: Lineup for USM Marengo - Saadi Abdelkader, Djelfi, Saadi Ali, Baya, Bouchane, Moussaoui, Touhami, Boukalfa, Lopez, Abbés, Ferhat. Lineup for O Hussein Dey - Vadel, Corronel, Santiago, Montovani, Ouzifi, Perret, Kader, Féz, Mas, Serrano, Mascaro

30 December 1951 Round 12	USM Marengo	2–1	GS Alger	Marengo
	Ferhat 40', 65'	Report	Azeff 35'	Stadium: Stade Municipal de Marengo; Referee: Belkessa
Note: Lineup for USM Marengo - Saadi Abdelkader, Maroc 2, Djelfi, Moussaoui, Bouchane, Boukalfa, Ferhat, Saadi Ali, Abbés, Saidi, Touhami. Lineup for GS Alger - Pellegrino, Fortuné, Belmonte, Ferrasse, Calmus, Torrés, Biton, Azef, Giono, Leduc, Deléo.

20 January 1952 Round 13	AS Saint Eugène	3–1	USM Marengo	Saint Eugène
	Alarcon 53', 59', 80'	Report	Ferhat 66' (pen.)	Stadium: Stade Communal de Saint Eugène; Attendance: 3,000; Referee: Jouvet
Note: Lineup for USM Marengo - Saâdi Abdelkader, Djelfi, Moussaoui, Djilali, Bouklouta, Saâdi Ali, Touhami, Saidi Boualem, Abbés, Bouchane, Ferhat. Lineup for AS Saint Eugène - Boubeker, Oliver, Bérenguer, Aboulker, Aouadj, Berrah, Alarcon, Brouel, Rouet, Boret, Rivas.

27 January 1952 Round 14	USM Marengo	3–0	RS Alger	Marengo
	Ferhat 10', 80'; Touhami 35'	Report		Stadium: Stade Municipal de Marengo; Referee: Rivieccio
Note: Lineup for USM Marengo - Saâdi Abdelkader, Djelfi, Moussaoui, Maroc I, Boukhalfa, Bouchane, Touhami, Saidi Boualem, Saâdi Ali, Abbés, Ferhat. Lineup for RS Alger - Dielh, Senane, Caillat, Vermeuil, Magliozzi, Saâdi, Zérapha, Gilabert, Zaïbek, Maouche, Ghanem.

17 February 1952 Round 15	Stade Guyotville	4–0	USM Marengo	Guyotville
	Gélabert ?'; Vitiello ?' ?'; Valence ?' (pen.)	Report		Referee: Mazzocchi
Note: Lineup for USM Marengo - Saâdi Abdelkader, Djelfi, Moussaoui, Djilali, Boukhalfa, Bouchane, Touhami, Saidi Boualem, Abbés, Saâdi Ali, Ferhat. Lineup for Stade Guyotville - Zaïdi, Salort, Ballester.V, Bénéjean, Liorens, De Pasauale, Camprésy, Ballester.P, Vitiello, Valence, Gélabert.

24 February 1952 Round 16	USM Marengo	1–3	USM Blida	Marengo
	Saâdi Ali 80'	Report	Mahieddine 3', 88'; Hadji 55'	Stadium: Stade Municipal de Marengo; Referee: Attanasio
Note: Lineup for USM Marengo - Maroc I, Djelfi, Moussaoui, Maroc II, Boukhalfa, Saâdi Ali, Saidi Boualem, Touhami, Abbès, Ferhat. Lineup for USM Blida - Menacer, Bouguerra, Mansouri, Bekhoucha, Hadji, Zerrouki, Dahmane, Mazouz, Mahieddine, Brakni, Chalane.

23 March 1952 Round 17	RU Alger	4–2	USM Marengo	Belcourt
	Bayié 3', 22', 73'; Ferrari 75'	Report	Abbés 1'; Saidi Boualem 89' (pen.)	Stadium: Stade municipal Attendance: 1,500; Referee: Cabot
Note: Lineup for USM Marengo - Saâdi Abdelkader, Djelfi, Moussaoui, Maroc II, Ferhat, Bouchane, Abbés, Boukhalfa, Saâdi Ali, Saidi Boualem, Touhami. Lineup for RU Alger - Laviognat, Daube, Jasseron, Rocher, Friand, Lorenzo, Ferrari, Bayié, Faglin, Florit, Riu.

30 March 1952 Round 18	USM Marengo	0–2	MC Alger	Marengo
		Report	Khabatou 44', 66'	Stadium: Stade Municipal de Marengo; Referee: Caratino
Note: Lineup for USM Marengo - Saâdi Abdelkader, Djelfi, Saâdi Ali, Moussaoui, Saidi Boualem, Bouziane, Bouanène, Touhami, Abbès, Abdat, Ferhat. Lineup for MC Alger - Belahcène, Hamoutène, Ouakiken Mohamed, Kouar Sid Ahmed dit Kouar I, Benhamou Hamid, Abdelaoui, Ait Saâda, Belbachir, Khabatou, Ouargli, Hahad.

13 April 1952 Round 19	GS Orléansville	4–1	USM Marengo	Orléansville
	Castello 17', 44'; Bertoli 22'; Daoud 55'	Report	Ferhat 60' (pen.)	Referee: Boccheciampe
Note: Lineup for USM Marengo - Saâdi Abdelkader, Saâdi Ali, Saidi Boualem, Moussaoui, Djelfi, Ferhat, Boukhalfa, Touhami, Lopez, Abbés, Bouchane. Lineup for GS Orléansville - Marie, Meilet, Maïza, Aubert, Messaoui, Khetib, Monnier, Gevaudan, Castello, Daoud, Bertoli.

20 April 1952 Round 20	USM Marengo	1–7	AS Boufarik	Marengo
	Touhami 77'	Report	Reichert 19', 44'; Olcina ?' ?'; Navarro 58' 60'; Vomero 88'	Stadium: Stade Municipal de Marengo
Note: Lineup for USM Marengo - Arbouche, Lopez, Djelfi, Saâdi Ali, Moussaoui, Bouchane, Boukhalfa, Abbés, Ferhat, Touhami, Saidi Boualem. Lineup for AS Boufarik - Gervais, massip, chazot, Vicédo, Benelfoul, Saïd-Saïd, Reichert, Navarro Valentin, Olcina, Vomero, Amiel.

27 April 1952 Round 21	FC Blidéen	2–1	USM Marengo	Blida
	Camand 26'; Meftah 66'	Report	Abbés 27'	Stadium: FCB Stadium
Note: Lineup for USM Marengo - Saâdi Abdelkader, Djelfi, Moussaoui, Boukhalfa, Bouchane, Touhami, Essahli, Abbés, ?, Saidi Boualem, Ferhat. Lineup for FC Blidéen - Rosens, Giner, gasque, hasni, Sicard, Raïs, Ruiz, Meftah, Camand, Schmitt, ?.

4 May 1952 Round 22	USM Marengo	1–3	O Hussein Dey	Marengo
	Saâdi Ali ?'	Report		Stadium: Stade Municipal de Marengo
Note: Lineup for USM Marengo - Saâdi Abdelkader, Moussaoui, Djelfi, Saâdi Ali, Boukhalfa, Boumouche, Ferhat, Kouïder, Abbés, Abdet, Saidi Boualem. Lineup for O Hussein Dey - Vadel, Tudury, Santiago, Montovani, Perret, Belamine, Serrano, Féz, Gomez, Scriba, Vianet.

== Forconi Cup ==
4 November 1951 Fourth Round	USM Marengo	4–0	AS Douéra	Castiglione
	Saadi 5'; Abdette 6', 81'; Abbès 55'	Report		Referee: Cabot
Note: Lineup for USM Marengo - Saadi Abdelkader, Djelfi, Moussaoui, Saadi Ali, Abbés, Ferhat, Boukalfa, Touhami, Bouramous, Saidi, Hadet. Lineup for AS Douéra - Ricard, Mari, Heistroffer, Lichtlé, Roussel, Ben El Kadi, Gognalons, Rippol, Cheutin, Taurines, Cabanis.

2 December 1951 Fifth Round	RU Alger	2–1 (a.e.t.)	USM Marengo	Boufarik
	Ferrari 42'; Baylé 51'	Report	Abbès 23'	Referee: Mazocchi
Note: Lineup for USM Marengo - Saadi Abdelkader, Djelfi, Saydi, Baya, Boukalfa, Moussaoui, Touhami, Saadi Ali, Abbés, Bouanem, Ferhat. Lineup for RU Alger - Lavoignat, Rochet, Jasseron, Florit, Bouvier, Firand, Ferrari, Lorenzo, Baylé, Coll, Dubernet.

== Squad information ==
=== Playing statistics ===
Pos.	Name	Division Honneur																						FC		Total
Pos.	Name	1	2	3	4	5	6	7	8	9	10	11	12	13	14	15	16	17	18	19	20	21	22	1	2	Total
GK	(France) Saadi Abdelkader	X	X	X	X	X	X	X		X	X	X	X											X	X	13
GK	(France) Arbouche																									
DF	(France) Djelfi	X	X	X	X	X	X	X		X	X	X	X											X	X	13
DF	(France) Moussaoui	X		X	X	X	X	X		X	X	X	X											X	X	12
DF	(France) Baya							X		X	X	X													X	5
DF	(France) Maroc II				X	X							X													3
DF	(France) Bouchane		X									X	X													3
MF	(France) Boukhalfa	X	X	X	X	X	X	X		X	X	X	X											X	X	13
MF	(France) Saadi Ali	X	X	X	X	X	X	X		X	X	X	X											X	X	13
MF	(France) Abdet	X		X	X	X	X	X																X		7
MF	(France) Semane	X	X	X							X															4
MF	(France) Essahli																									
MF	(France) Bougheziel																									
MF	(France) Gueddouche										X															1
FW	(France) Abbés	X	X	X	X	X	X	X		X	X	X	X											X	X	13
FW	(France) Ferhat	X	X	X	X	X	X	X		X	X	X	X											X	X	13
FW	(France) Touhami	X		X	X	X	X			X	X	X	X											X	X	11
FW	(France) Kabli																									
FW	(France) Boualem				X	X	X	X		X															X	6
FW	(France) Hocine	X	X	X			X	X																		5
FW	(France) Ourouabah																									
FW	(France) Bendou																									
	(France) Saidi Boualem									X			X											X	X	4
	(France) Lopez		X									X														2
	(France) Zemmouri		X																							1
	(France) Daidi						X																			1
	(France) Bouramous																							X		1

=== Goalscorers ===
Includes all competitive matches. The list is sorted alphabetically by surname when total goals are equal.

Nat.	Player	Pos.	DH	FC	TOTAL
(France)	Ferhat	FW	10	0	10
(France)	Abbès	?	6	2	8
(France)	Touhami	?	3	0	3
(France)	Saadi Ali	?	2	1	3
(France)	Abdet	?	0	2	2
(France)	Hocine	?	1	0	1
(France)	Moussaoui	?	1	0	1
(France)	Saidi Boualem	?	1	0	1
Own Goals			0	0	0
Totals			24	5	29
