= 1942–43 League Algiers =

Football league

League Algiers Football Association
- Season: 1942–43
- Champions: AS Saint Eugène (DH)
- Relegated: FC Blida (DH)

The 1942–43 League Algiers Football Association season started on September 27, 1942 and ended on May 16, 1943. This was the 21st edition of the championships.

== Final results ==
=== Division Honneur ===
- Clubs of Division Honneur

The Division Honneur is the highest level of League Algiers Football Association, the equivalent of the elite for this league. It consists of twelve clubs who compete in both the title of "Champion of Division Honneur" and that of "Champion of Algiers", since it is the highest degree.

Pos	Team	Pld	W	D	L	GF	GA	GD	Pts	Qualification or relegation
1	AS Saint Eugène (C)	18	16	2	0	40	9	+31	52	Qualified for North African Championship
2	RS Alger	17	10	3	4	35	14	+21	40	
3	RU Alger	18	10	2	6	41	19	+22	40	
4	O Hussein Dey	18	6	7	5	27	24	+3	37	
5	MC Alger	18	4	8	6	20	30	−10	34	
6	GS Alger	18	5	6	7	22	32	−10	34	
7	AS Boufarik	18	6	3	9	29	29	0	33	
8	US Blida	18	4	6	8	19	32	−13	32	
9	USO Mitidja	18	2	6	10	18	29	−11	28	
10	FC Blida	17	2	3	12	16	37	−21	24	Relegated to 1942–43 First Division

(C) Champions

=== Round 1 ===
Team 1	Agg.	Team 2	1st leg	2nd leg
RUA (Algeria)	4–0	(Algeria) USB	0–0	4–0
OHD (Algeria)	4–2	(Algeria) FCB	1–1	3–1
ASB (Algeria)	6–7	(Algeria) RS Alger	4–2	2–5
ASSE (Algeria)	3–0	(Algeria) USOM	2–0	1–0
GSA (Algeria)	3–3	(Algeria) MCA	3–3	0–0

1st leg: 2nd leg:

=== Round 2 ===
Team 1	Agg.	Team 2	1st leg	2nd leg
RUA (Algeria)	4–1	(Algeria) GSA	4–1	0–0
ASSE (Algeria)	2–1	(Algeria) RS Alger	2–1	2-1
ASB (Algeria)	2–1	(Algeria) OHD	2–1	0–2
FCB (Algeria)	3–1	(Algeria) USOM	3–1	1–1
USB (Algeria)	0–0	(Algeria) MCA	0–0	0–1

1st leg: 2nd leg:

=== Round 3 ===
Team 1	Agg.	Team 2	1st leg	2nd leg
RUA (Algeria)	1–0	(Algeria) RS Alger	1–0	0–2
ASB (Algeria)	0–0	(Algeria) USOM	0–0	2–0
OHD (Algeria)	1–1	(Algeria) MCA	1–1	1–1
FCB (Algeria)	1–1	(Algeria) USB	1–1	1–1
ASSE (Algeria)	3–0	(Algeria) GSA	3–0	?–?

1st leg: 2nd Leg:

=== Round 4 ===
Team 1	Agg.	Team 2	1st leg	2nd leg
OHD (Algeria)	3–1	(Algeria) GSA	3–1	–
RS Alger (Algeria)	2–0	(Algeria) USOM	2–0	0–0
ASSE (Algeria)	3–0	(Algeria) USB	3–0	–
FCB (Algeria)	2–1	(Algeria) ASB	2–1	1-2
MCA (Algeria)	3–2	(Algeria) RUA	3–2	–

1st leg: 2nd leg:

=== Round 5 ===
Team 1	Agg.	Team 2	1st leg	2nd leg
OHD (Algeria)	1–0	(Algeria) USOM	1–0	4-5
ASB (Algeria)	2–0	(Algeria) USB	2–0	1–1
MCA (Algeria)	1–0	(Algeria) FCB	1–0	1–1
ASSE (Algeria)	1–0	(Algeria) RUA	1–0	2–1
RS Alger (Algeria)	1–0	(Algeria) GSA	1–0	0–0

1st leg: 2nd leg:

=== Round 6 ===
Team 1	Agg.	Team 2	1st leg	2nd leg
RUA (Algeria)	1–0	(Algeria) ASB	1–0	2–1
OHD (Algeria)	2–2	(Algeria) USB	2–2	3–0
ASSE (Algeria)	1–0	(Algeria) MCA	1–0	5–0
RS Alger (Algeria)	5–1	(Algeria) FCB	5–1	–
GSA (Algeria)	1–0	(Algeria) USOM	1–0	4–2

1st leg: 2nd leg:

=== Round 7 ===
Team 1	Agg.	Team 2	1st leg	2nd leg
ASSE (Algeria)	4–3	(Algeria) ASB	4–3	2–1
USB (Algeria)	3–2	(Algeria) USOM	3–2	1–1
RUA (Algeria)	2–1	(Algeria) OHD	2–1	1-3
GSA (Algeria)	1–0	(Algeria) FCB	1–0	2–1
RS Alger (Algeria)	2–1	(Algeria) MCA	2–1	3–1

1st leg: 2nd leg:

=== Round 8 ===
Team 1	Agg.	Team 2	1st leg	2nd leg
RUA (Algeria)	7–0	(Algeria) FCB	7–0	4–0
ASSE (Algeria)	4–1	(Algeria) OHD	4–1	0–0
GSA (Algeria)	4–1	(Algeria) ASB	4–1	2- 4
MCA (Algeria)	1–1	(Algeria) USOM	1–1	1–1
RS Alger (Algeria)	1–0	(Algeria) USB	1–0	7–0

1st leg: 2nd leg:

=== Round 9 ===
Team 1	Agg.	Team 2	1st leg	2nd leg
FCB (Algeria)	0–0	(Algeria) ASSE	0–0	1-5
USOM (Algeria)	2–2	(Algeria) RUA	2–2	1-2
USB (Algeria)	3–1	(Algeria) GSA	3–1	7–0
OHD (Algeria)	0–0	(Algeria) RS Alger	0–0	0-3
MCA (Algeria)	2–0	(Algeria) ASB	2–0	2–2

1st leg: 2nd leg:

=== First Division ===
- Groupe I
- Groupe II
- Groupe III
- Results of Playoffs First Division

=== Second Division ===
- Groupe I
- Groupe II
- Groupe III
- Groupe IV
- Results of Playoffs Second Division

=== Third Division ===
- Groupe I
- Groupe II
- Groupe III
- Groupe IV
- Results of Playoffs Third Division
