= 1954–55 USM Marengo season =

USM Marengo
1954–55 season
- Stadium: Stade Municipal de Marengo, Marengo
- Promotion Honneur: 8th
- Forconi Cup: Sixth round

In the 1954–55 season, USM Marengo is competing in the Promotion Honneur for the 8th season French colonial era, as well as the Forconi Cup.

== Competitions ==
=== Overview ===
Competition	Record								Started round	Final position / round	First match	Last match
Competition	G	W	D	L	GF	GA	GD	Win %	Started round	Final position / round	First match	Last match
Promotion Honneur	22	4	11	7	25	33	−8	18.18	—N/a	8th	12 September 1954	8 May 1955
Forconi Cup	3	1	0	2	7	5	+2	33.33	Fourth round	Sixth round	19 September 1954	7 November 1954
Total	25	5	11	9	32	38	−6	20.00				

=== Promotion Honneur ===
==== League table ====
Pos	Team	Pld	W	D	L	GF	GA	GD	Pts	Promotion or relegation
7	RC Maison Carrée	22	8	6	8	31	22	+9	44	
8	JS El Biar	22	5	9	8	31	25	+6	41	
9	USM Marengo	22	4	11	7	25	33	−8	41	
10	WR Belcourt	22	5	8	9	25	33	−8	40	
11	ÉS Zéralda	22	4	7	11	31	42	−11	37	Relegated to 1955–56 First Division

Source: L'Écho d'Alger

==== Results by round ====
Round	1	2	3	4	5	6	7	8	9	10	11	12	13	14	15	16	17	18	19	20	21	22
Ground	H	A	A	H	A	H	A	H	A	H	A	A	H	H	A	H	A	H	A	H	A	H
Result	W	D	D	D	D	D	L	L	D	W	L	L	D	D	W	D	L	W	D	D	L	L
Position	1	3	1	1	2	2	3	7		5		8	8	8	4	5	8	5	5	6	8	8

Updated to match(es) played on 27 April 1952. Source: Competitive matches
A = Away; H = Home; W = Win; D = Draw; L = Loss

=== Matches ===
Win Draw Loss

12 September 1954 Round 1	USM Marengo	3–2	ÉS Zéralda	Marengo
		Report		Stadium: Stade Municipal de Marengo
Note: Lineup for USM Marengo - , , , , , , , , , , .

26 September 1954 Round 2	JS Kabylie	1–1	USM Marengo	Tizi Ouzou
	Kouffi 15'	Report	Ferhat 82'	Stadium: Stade Municipal Arsène Weinman
Note: Lineup for USM Marengo - Sedik, Djelfi, Saâdi, Abdet, Medjaeb, Azizi, Abdesselem, Boualem, Semmane, Guendouz, Ferhat.

10 October 1954 Round 3	OM Saint-Eugène	1–1	USM Marengo	Saint Eugène
		Report	Saâdi 39'	Stadium: Stade Communal de Saint Eugène; Referee: Caffier
Note: Lineup for USM Marengo - Seddik, Djelfi, Saâdi, Maroc, Semmane, Boukhalfa, Ezzedaïm, Boualem, Essahli, Ferhat, Guendouz.

17 October 1954 Round 4	USM Marengo	0–0	WR Belcourt	Marengo
		Report		Stadium: Stade Municipal de Marengo; Referee: Kelifi
Note: Lineup for USM Marengo - Chelik, Aïssaili, Saâdi, Djelfi, Boukelfa, Azizi, Touhami, Saïdoune, Guendouz, Boualem, Ferhat.

31 October 1954 Round 5	OCB Oued Fodda	2–2	USM Marengo	Oued Fodda
	Magio 58'; Tahiri ?'	Report	? 38'; ? ?'	Referee: Lapasset
Note: Lineup for USM Marengo - Sedik, Adad, Saâdi, Djelfi, Medjaed, Essahli, Boualem, Zouani, Saïdoune, Ferhat, Guendouz.

21 November 1954 Round 6	O Littoral	1–1	USM Marengo	Castiglione
	Garci I ?'	Report	Ferat 59'	Stadium: Stade Municipal de Castiglione; Referee: Bertouche
Note: Lineup for USM Marengo - Sedik, Abed, Saâdi, Djelfi, Boukelfa, Saïdoune, Teméme, Moussaoui, Ferhat, Boualem, Kinder.

28 November 1954 Round 7	USM Marengo	0–2	JS El Biar	Marengo
		Report	? ?'; ? ?'	Stadium: Stade Municipal de Marengo
Note: Lineup for USM Marengo - , , , , , , , , , , .

5 December 1954 Round 8	RU Alger	3–0	USM Marengo	Belcourt
		Report		Stadium: Stade municipal Referee: Jouve
Note: Lineup for USM Marengo - Sedik, Djelfi, Abdet, Boukhalfa, Semmane, Boualem, Ferhat, Touhami, Guendouz, Saâdi, Ladia.

1954 Round 9	USM Marengo	0–0	RC Maison Carrée	Marengo
		Report		Stadium: Stade Municipal de Marengo
Note: Lineup for USM Marengo - , , , , , , , , , , .

19 December 1954 Round 10	USM Marengo	2–0	NA Hussein Dey	Marengo
	Saâdi 33'; Guendouz 83'	Report		Stadium: Stade Municipal de Marengo; Referee: Benchelah
Note: Lineup for USM Marengo - Seddik, Djelfi, Boukelfa, Abdet, Essahli, Semmane, Geundouz, Touhami, Saâdi, Ferhat, Boualem.

23 January 1955 (Note: The match was originally to be played on 26 December 1954, but it was postponed.) Round 11	GS Orléansville	3–1	USM Marengo	Orléansville
	Guichard 33', 51'; Fanals ?'	Report	Abdet 88'	Stadium: Stade Municipal de Orléansville
Note: Lineup for USM Marengo - Sedik, Djelfi, Ferhat, Messaoudi, Boukhalfa, Saâdi, Geundouz, Boualem, Semmane, Bendou, Abdet.

26 January 1955 Round 12	ÉS Zéralda	1–0	USM Marengo	Zéralda
	Motta 39'	Report		Referee: Lapasset
Note: Lineup for USM Marengo - Sedik, Djelfi, Saâdi, Boukhalfa, Abdet, Setta, Sellem, Bouinem, Geundouz, Ferhat, Messaoudi.

30 January 1955 Round 13	USM Marengo	2–2	JS Kabylie	Marengo
15:00	Bouanéne 40'; Boukhalfa ?' (pen.)	Report	Azoug 22'; Kouffi 75'	Stadium: Stade Municipal de Marengo; Referee: Belliguier
Note: Lineup for USM Marengo - Sedik, Djelfi, Saâdi, Boukhalfa, Abdet, Bouanéne, Kelif, Semmane, Geundouz, Ferhat, Messaoudi.

13 February 1955 Round 14	USM Marengo	1–1	OM Saint-Eugène	Marengo
	Ferhat 74'	Report	? 20' (o.g.)	Stadium: Stade Municipal de Marengo; Referee: Carratino
Note: Lineup for USM Marengo - Sedik, Djelfi, Essahli, Cherif, Boukhalfa, Messaoudi, Semmane, Geundouz, Saïdoune, Boualem, Ferhat.

27 February 1955 Round 15	WR Belcourt	1–2	USM Marengo	Belcourt
	? ?'	Report	? ?'; ? ?'	Stadium: Stade municipal Referee: Mück
Note: Lineup for USM Marengo - Sedik, Djelfi, Essahli, Touhami, Boukhalfa, Messaoudi, Semmane, Geundouz, Saïdoune, Boualem, Ferhat.

6 March 1955 Round 16	USM Marengo	2–2	OCB Oued Fodda	Marengo
	Saïdoune 23'; Geundouz 25'	Report	Bernardi II 5'; Morata 6'	Stadium: Stade Municipal de Marengo; Referee: Mazzochi
Note: Lineup for USM Marengo - Sedik, Messaoudi, Djelfi, Geundouz I, Geundouz II, Semmane, Saïdoune, Boukhalfa, Ferhat, Touhami, Bouamame.

13 March 1955 Round 17	RC Maison Carrée	2–1	USM Marengo	Maison-Carrée
	? ?'; ? ?'	Report	Semmane 53'	Stadium: Stade Lavigerie
Note: Lineup for USM Marengo - Sedik, Saïdoune, Semmane, Boukhalfa, ?, ?, ?, ?, ?, ?, ?.

27 March 1955 Round 18	USM Marengo	2–1	O Littoral	Marengo
	Saàdi 51', 54'	Report	Liorca 85'	Stadium: Stade Municipal de Marengo
Note: Lineup for USM Marengo - Sedik, Abdet, Djelfi, Messaoudi, Boukhalfa, Geundouz, Ferhat, Boualem, Saïdoune, Saàdi, Semmane.

3 April 1955 Round 19	JS El Biar	1–1	USM Marengo	El Biar
	Soukhane ?'	Report	Boualem 59'	Referee: Jouve
Note: Lineup for USM Marengo - Sedik, Messaoudi, Djelfi, Abdet, Boukhalfa, Geundouz, Semmane, Saàdi, Saïdoune, Boualem, Ferhat.

17 April 1955 Round 20	USM Marengo	2–2	RU Alger	Marengo
15:30	Seratt 15'; Saàdi 60'	Report	Mekalfa 20'; Coll 48'	Stadium: Stade Municipal de Marengo; Referee: Mazzochi
Note: Lineup for USM Marengo - Sedik, Djelfi, Abdet, Geundouz, Boukhalfa, Semmane, Saàdi, Saïdoune, Boualem, Messaoudi, Seratt.

24 April 1955 Round 21	NA Hussein Dey	3–1	USM Marengo	Hussein Dey
	Lardjane 55'; Boudissa 78', 82'	Report	Essahli 3'; Semmane (red card) 50'; Boualem (red card) 80'	Stadium: Stade de Nouvel-Ambert
Note: Lineup for USM Marengo - Sedik, Djelfi, Messaoudi, Geundouz, Boukhalfa, Semmane, Boualem, Ferhat, Saàdi, Saïdoune, Essahli.

8 May 1955 Round 22	USM Marengo	0–1	GS Orléansville	Marengo
		Report	Guellou 70'	Stadium: Stade Municipal de Marengo; Referee: Bouchiampe
Note: Lineup for USM Marengo - Sedik, Messaoudi, Saàdi, Abdet, Saïdoune, Geundouz I, Geundouz II, Essahli, Touhami, Didouh, Kediche.

== Forconi Cup ==
19 September 1954 Fourth round	USM Marengo	5–2	SCM Blida	El Affroun
		Report
Note: Lineup for USM Marengo - Foduk, Djelfi, Saâdi, Abdet, Boukhalfa, Esssaheli, Abdesselem, Ben Ameur, Guendouz, Saïdoune, Ferhat.

24 October 1954 Fifth round	USM Marengo	2–0	OCB Oued-Fodda	El Affroun
		Report

7 November 1954 Sixth round	RC Maison Carré	3–0	USM Marengo	Guyotville
	Kaci 17'; Mattéï 26'; Molinié 57'	Report		Referee: Belkessa
Note: Lineup for USM Marengo - Seddik, Djelfi, Saàdi, Abdet, Boukhalfa, Abdesselem, Touhami, Guendouz, Saïdoune, Boualem, Ferhat.

== Squad information ==
=== Playing statistics ===
Pos.	Name	Division Honneur																						FC			Total
Pos.	Name	1	2	3	4	5	6	7	8	9	10	11	12	13	14	15	16	17	18	19	20	21	22	1	2	3	Total
GK	(France) Sedik																										
GK	(France) Abdelkader Saàdi																										
	(France) Iccene Djelfi																										
	(France) Moussaoui																										
	(France) Boukhalfa																										
	(France) Ali Saàdi																										
	(France) Abdet																										
	(France) Semmane																										
	(France) Ahmed Essahli																										
	(France) Ferhat																										
	(France) Touhami																										
	(France) Boualem																										
	(France) Brahim Bendou																										
	(France) Abdesselem																										
	(France) Geundouz																										
	(France) Messaoudi																										
	(France) Azizi																										
	(France) Medjaeb																										
	(France) Cherif Maroc																										

=== Goalscorers ===
Includes all competitive matches. The list is sorted alphabetically by surname when total goals are equal.
