= 1952–53 League Algiers =

League Algiers Football Association
- Season: 1952–53
- Champions: FC Blida (DH)
- Relegated: SCU El Biar, RU Alger (DH)

The 1952–53 League Algiers Football Association season started on September 14, 1952 and ended on June 7, 1953. This is the 31st edition of the championships.

== Final results ==
=== Division Honneur ===
- Clubs of Division Honneur

The Division Honneur is the highest level of League Algiers Football Association, the equivalent of the elite for this league. It consists of twelve clubs who compete in both the title of "Champion of Division Honneur" and that of "Champion of Algiers", since it is the highest degree.

Pos	Team	Pld	W	D	L	GF	GA	GD	Pts	Qualification or relegation
1	FC Blida (C)	22	10	9	3	41	25	+16	51	Qualified for North African Championship
2	MC Alger	22	7	10	5	26	23	+3	46	
3	GS Orléansville	22	8	8	6	27	19	+8	46	
4	Olympique de Marengo	22	9	5	8	34	35	−1	45	
5	AS Saint Eugène	22	8	7	7	26	22	+4	45	
6	AS Boufarik	22	9	4	9	30	34	−4	44	
7	Olympique d'Hussein Dey	22	8	6	8	24	27	−3	44	
8	RS Alger	22	7	7	8	21	20	+1	43	
9	Stade Guyotville	22	6	9	7	30	33	−3	43	
10	SCU El Biar (R)	22	6	8	8	21	24	−3	42	Qualification for relegation play-offs
11	USM Blida	22	8	4	10	23	27	−4	42	Qualification for relegation play-offs
12	RU Alger (R)	22	4	7	11	20	28	−8	37	Relegated to 1953–54 First Division

Source: L'Écho d'Alger
(C) Champions; (R) Relegated

==== Results of Playoffs Division Honneur ====
10 May 1953
15:30
Playoffs

USM Blida (10)	5–3	SCU El-Biar (11)
Hadji 2'; Bensamet 39', 75'; Brakni 43'; Yahia 44' Bayou, Bouguerra, Bekhoucha, Ousser, Hadji, Chalane, Bensamet, Yahia, Mahieddine, Brakni, Boumbadji	Report	Balogh 5'; De Villeneuve 72', 82' Benolt, Vidal P, Chakor, Gorgue, Gimenez, De Villeneuve, Boukoussa, Vidal H, Lopez, Falzon, Balogh

Stade municipal, Belcourt
Referee: M. Rivieccio

=== First Division ===
==== Groupe I ====
Pos	Team	Pld	W	D	L	GF	GA	GD	Pts	Qualification
1	USM Marengo	18	9	9	0	0	0	0	45	Qualified for Playoffs First Division
2	JS Kabylie	18	9	6	3	0	0	0	42	
3	O Tizi-Ouzou	18	8	4	6	0	0	0	38	
4	US Blida	18	9	2	7	0	0	0	38	
5	SC Algérois	17	6	6	5	0	0	0	35	
6	AST Algérois	18	4	7	7	0	0	0	33	
7	GS Alger Hydra	18	5	5	8	0	0	0	33	
8	USM Maison Carré	18	6	2	10	0	0	0	32	
9	US Fort-de-l'Eau	18	4	5	9	0	0	0	31	Relegated to 1953–54 Second Division
10	JS El Biar	17	4	4	9	0	0	0	29	Relegated to 1953–54 Second Division

Source: L'Echo d'Alger

==== Groupe II ====
Pos	Team	Pld	W	D	L	GF	GA	GD	Pts	Qualification
1	RC Maison Carrée	17	12	4	1	0	0	0	45	Qualified for Playoffs First Division
2	WR Belcourt	18	10	6	2	0	0	0	44	
3	RC Kouba	18	8	5	5	0	0	0	39	
4	US Ouest Mitidja	18	7	6	5	0	0	0	38	
5	Olympique Littoral	18	8	4	6	0	0	0	38	
6	AS Orléansville	18	6	6	6	0	0	0	36	
7	OM Ruisseau	18	5	6	7	0	0	0	34	
8	JSM Algérois	17	3	6	8	0	0	0	29	
9	Olympique Rouïba	18	5	1	12	0	0	0	29	Relegated to 1953–54 Second Division
10	CC Algérois	18	3	0	15	0	0	0	24	Relegated to 1953–54 Second Division

Source: L'Echo d'Alger

==== Groupe III ====
Pos	Team	Pld	W	D	L	GF	GA	GD	Pts	Qualification
1	GS Alger	18	15	2	1	0	0	0	50	Qualified for Playoffs First Division
2	WA Boufarik	18	9	6	3	0	0	0	42	Qualified for Playoffs First Division
3	ES Zéralda	18	6	6	6	0	0	0	36	
4	OCB Oued-Fodda	18	7	4	7	0	0	0	36	
5	ASPTT Alger	18	6	5	7	0	0	0	35	
6	NA Hussein Dey	18	5	7	6	0	0	0	35	
7	OM Saint Eugène	18	3	10	5	0	0	0	34	
8	USM Alger	18	4	8	6	0	0	0	34	
9	AS Kouba	18	4	7	7	0	0	0	33	Relegated to 1953–54 Second Division
10	Olympique de Médéa	18	0	7	11	0	0	0	25	Relegated to 1953–54 Second Division

Source: L'Echo d'Alger

==== Results of Playoffs First Division ====
The promotion match to the First Division between RC Maison Carrée and WA Boufarik at Stade municipal.

10 May 1953
Playoffs

RC Maison Carrée	4–3 (a.e.t.)	USM Marengo
Pujol, Marmu, Azzouz, Calvi, Sellal, Cazalis, Moulinie, Kermiche, Canto.R, Juanéda, Canto.D.	Report	Arbouche, Maroc, Saadi, Djelfi, Abdet, Boukalfa, Ferhat, Bouinem, Abbés, Dairi, Amrouche.

Saint Eugène, Saint Eugène
Attendance: 7,000
Referee: Carratino
17 May 1953
Playoffs

RC Maison Carrée	3–0	WA Boufarik
Pujol - Kabri, Azzouz, Marmu - Cazalis, Sellal - Canto I, Kermiche, Canto II, Juaneda, Molinié.	Report	Ahras - Bourricha I, Larbi, Ali Chérif - Kouidri, Rezig II - Tabouddouche, Hanine, Bachtarzi, Rezig I, Bouricha II.

Stade municipal, Belcourt

=== Second Division ===
- Groupe I
- Groupe II
- Groupe III
- Groupe IV
- Results of Playoffs Second Division

=== Third Division ===
- Groupe I
- Groupe II
- Groupe III
- Groupe IV
- Results of Playoffs Third Division
