= 1940–41 USM Blida season =

USM Blida
1940–41 season
- President: Hamid Kassoul
- Stadium: FCB
- First Division: 1st
- Coupe de la Ligue: Round of 16
Home colours

In the 1940–41 season, USM Blida competed in the First Division in the 8th season of the French colonial era. They were part of the First Division and the Coupe de la Ligue.

== Friendly ==
Win Draw Loss

22 May 1941 Semi-final	MC Alger	1–2	USM Blida	Bologhine, Algiers
16:45				Stadium: Stade de Saint-Eugène
Note: Tournoi de Saint-Eugène

22 May 1941 Final	AS Saint Eugène	0–1	USM Blida	Bologhine, Algiers
				Stadium: Stade de Saint-Eugène
Note: Tournoi de Saint-Eugène

25 May 1941 Friendly	USM Blida	3–1	MC Alger	Blida
	Abderrahmane Hatem; Mustapha Bendjiar; Hamidouche		Albor Jordan	Stadium: Brakni Brothers Stadium
Note: Friendly

== Competitions ==
=== Overview ===
Competition	Record								Started round	Final position / round	First match	Last match
Competition	G	W	D	L	GF	GA	GD	Win %	Started round	Final position / round	First match	Last match
Championnat	10	8	2	0	33	9	+24	80.00	—	1st	20 October 1940	18 May 1941
Coupe de la Ligue	5	2	2	1	16	4	+12	40.00	1st Round	Round of 16	3 November 1940	23 February 1941
Total	15	10	4	1	49	13	+36	66.67				

=== League table ===
Pos	Team	Pld	W	D	L	GF	GA	GD	Pts
1	USM Blida	10	8	2	0	33	9	+24	28
2	AS Boufarik (Reserve)	9	4	1	4	20	18	+2	18
3	Olympique de Marengo	9	3	3	3	15	16	−1	18
4	FC Blida (Reserve)	10	4	0	6	18	22	−4	18
5	US Blida (Reserve)	8	3	0	5	16	20	−4	14
6	US Ouest Mitidja (Reserve)	8	1	2	5	6	23	−17	12

=== Results ===
Home \ Away	ASB	FCB	OM	USB	USMB	USOM
ASB		5–1	2–1	5–1	0–1	4–1
FCB	6–1		3–1	2–0	1–2	3–0
OM	2–1	2–0		3–0	2–2	2–2
USB	4–1	4–0	–		2–6	4–0
USMB	1–1	5–1	5–1	3–1		3–0
USOM	–	2–1	1–1	–	0–5	

Updated to match(es) played on unknown. Source:
Legend: Blue = home team win; Yellow = draw; Red = away team win.

== First Division ==
=== Matches ===
Win Draw Loss

20 October 1940 Round 1	USM Blida	5–1	Olympique de Marengo	Blida
	Benelfoul; Bendjiar; Hatem	Report		Stadium: USB; Referee: Martorel

27 October 1940 Round 2	FC Blida (2)	1–2	USM Blida	Blida
13:45	Hamidouche (pen.) (pen.)	Report		Stadium: FCB

10 November 1940 Round 3	US Blida (2)	2–6	USM Blida	Blida
13:30		Report		Stadium: USB

17 November 1940 Round 4	USM Blida	3–0	US Ouest Mitidja (2)	Blida
	Hamidouche (pen.)	(1–0); Report		Stadium: USB

24 November 1940 Round 5	USM Blida	1–1	AS Boufarik (2)	Blida
13:30		Report		Stadium: USB

26 January 1941 Round 6	Olympique de Marengo	2–2	USM Blida	Marengo
14:15		Report

9 February 1941 Round 7	USM Blida	5–1	FC Blida (2)	Blida
		Report

16 March 1941 Round 8	USM Blida	3–1	US Blida (2)	Blida
		Report

30 March 1941 Round 9	US Ouest Mitidja (2)	0–5	USM Blida	Mouzaïa
		Report

18 May 1941 Round 10	AS Boufarik (2)	0–1	USM Blida	Boufarik
		Report	Hamidouche 50'

== Coupe de la Ligue d'Alger ==
3 November 1940 1st Round	USM Blida	10–0	ASPTT Alger	Boufarik
14:00		Report

15 December 1940 2nd Round	USM Blida	4–1	AST Alger	Maison Carré
15:15		Report

2 February 1941 Round of 16	FC Blida	1–1 (a.e.t.)	USM Blida	Blida
15:00	Azerig Quadri; Georges Bachelu, Mimi Labattut; Jean Giner, Louis Bernard, Pons; Soria I, Azerig, Yvon Samary, Henri Fuster, Soria II	(0–0); Report	Khelladi Meradi; Farès, Mansouri; Ouzera, Chekaïmi, Imcaoudène as Bob; Benelfoul, Ali Saïb as Saïd, Khelladi, Hamidouche, Hatem	Stadium: FCB

16 February 1941 Round of 16 (R)	FC Blida	0–0 (a.e.t.)	USM Blida	Blida
15:00	Armand Libérati; Georges Bachelu, Mimi Labattut; Jean Giner, Louis Bernard, Pons; René Soria, Lucien Guarinos, Yvon Samary, Vallès, Azerig	Report	Meradi; Farès, Mansouri; Hamidouche, Imcaoudène as Bob, Chekaïmi; Benelfoul, Ali Saïb as Saïd, Bendjiar, Khelladi, Hatem	Stadium: FCB; Referee: Todori

23 February 1941 Round of 16 (R2)	FC Blida	2–1	USM Blida	Blida
15:00	Fuster 10'; Guarinos 40' Armand Libérati; Georges Bachelu, Mimi Labattut; Bébert Ramos, Louis Bernard, Pons; René Soria, Lucien Guarinos, Yvon Samary, Henri Fuster, Azerig	(2–0); Report	Benelfoul Meradi, Farès, Mansouri; Ouzera, Imcaoudène as Bob, Chekaimi; Benelfoul, Ali Saïb as Saïd, Bendjiar, Hamidouche, Hatem	Stadium: FCB; Referee: Winchell

== Players statistics ==

USM Blida 1940–41

No.	Pos	Nat	Player	Total		League		League Cup	
No.	Pos	Nat	Player	Apps	Goals	Apps	Goals	Apps	Goals
Goalkeepers
	GK	(Algeria) ALG	Abdelaziz Meradi (Ex-FCB)	0	0	-	-	-	-
Defenders
	DF	(Algeria) ALG	Ali Mansouri as Ali Doudou	0	0	-	-	-	-
	DF	(Algeria) ALG	Mohamed Farès (Ex-ASB)	0	0	-	-	-	-
Midfielders
	MF	(Algeria) ALG	Ali Hamidouche (Ex-ASB)	0	0	-	-	-	-
	MF	(Algeria) ALG	Mohamed Imcaoudène as Bob (Ex-FCB)	0	0	-	-	-	-
	MF	(Algeria) ALG	Mohamed Mellal	0	0	-	-	-	-
	MF	(Algeria) ALG	Abdelaziz Chekaimi (Ex-FCB)	0	0	-	-	-	-
	MF	(Algeria) ALG	Kaddour Ouzera	0	0	-	-	-	-
Forwards
	FW	(Algeria) ALG	Ahmed Benelfoul (Ex-ASB)	0	0	-	-	-	-
	FW	(Algeria) ALG	Mustapha Bendjiar	0	0	-	-	-	-
	FW	(Algeria) ALG	Ali Saïb as Saïd (Ex-ASB)	0	0	-	-	-	-
	FW	(Algeria) ALG	Abderrahmane Hatem	0	0	-	-	-	-
	FW	(Algeria) ALG	Ahmed Khelladi	0	0	-	-	-	-
