= 1947–48 League Algiers =

League Algiers Football Association
- Season: 1947–48
- Champions: O Hussein Dey (DH)
- Relegated: GS Orléansville (DH)

The 1947–48 League Algiers Football Association season started on September 14, 1947, and ended on June 3, 1948. This is the 26th edition of the championships.

== Final results ==
=== Division Honneur ===
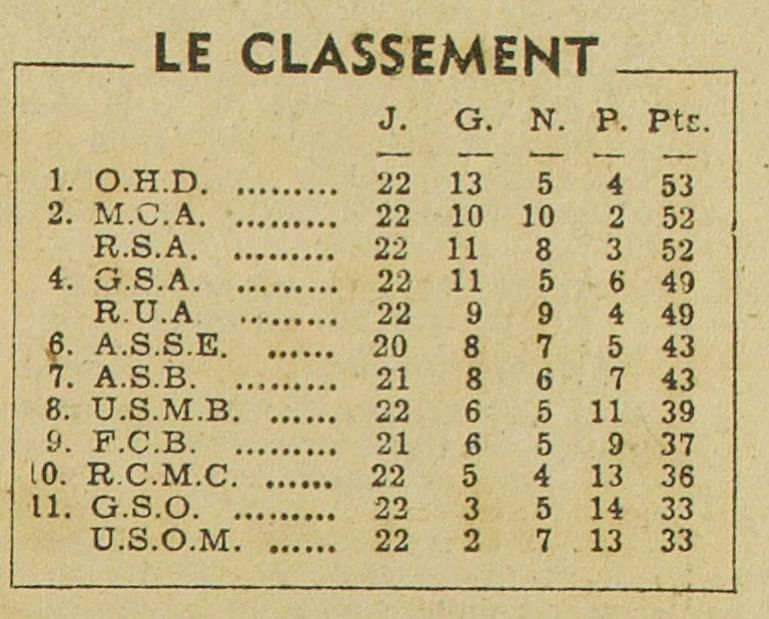
1947–48 League Algiers Standings

- Clubs of Division Honneur

The Division Honneur is the highest level of League Algiers Football Association, the equivalent of the elite for this league. It consists of twelve clubs who compete in both the title of "Champion of Division Honneur" and that of "Champion of Algiers", since it is the highest degree.

Pos	Team	Pld	W	D	L	GF	GA	GD	Pts	Qualification or relegation
1	O Hussein Dey (C)	22	13	5	4	42	23	+19	53	Qualified for North African Championship
2	MC Alger	22	10	10	2	32	17	+15	52	
3	RS Alger	22	11	8	3	24	21	+3	52	
4	GS Alger	22	11	5	6	0	0	0	49	
5	RU Alger	22	9	9	4	29	23	+6	49	
6	AS Saint Eugène	20	8	7	5	0	0	0	43	
7	AS Boufarik	21	8	6	7	0	0	0	43	
8	USM Blida	22	6	5	11	19	30	−11	39	
9	FC Blida	20	6	5	9	0	0	0	37	
10	RC Maison Carrée	22	5	4	13	0	0	0	36	
11	GS Orléansville	22	3	5	14	0	0	0	33	
12	USO Mitidja	22	2	7	13	0	0	0	33	Relegated to 1950–51 First Division

Source: L'Echo d'Alger
(C) Champions

=== First Division ===
- Groupe I
- Groupe II
- Groupe III
- Results of Playoffs First Division

=== Second Division ===
- Groupe I
- Groupe II
- Groupe III
- Groupe IV
- Results of Playoffs Second Division

=== Third Division ===
- Groupe I
- Groupe II
- Groupe III
- Groupe IV
- Results of Playoffs Third Division
