= 1954–55 League Algiers =

League Algiers Football Association
- Season: 1954–55
- Champions: GS Alger (DH); GS Orléansville (PH)
- Relegated: ASPTT Alger, O Hussein Dey (DH); ÉS Zéralda, O Littoral (PH)

The season 1954–55 the League Algiers Football Association, started on September 18, 1954. and ended on May 29, 1955. This is the 33rd edition of the championships.

== Final results ==
=== Division Honor ===
Pos	Team	Pld	W	D	L	GF	GA	GD	Pts	Qualification or relegation
1	GS Alger (C)	22	15	5	2	40	20	+20	57	Qualified for North African Championship
2	MC Alger	22	13	5	4	32	15	+17	53	
3	S.Guyotville	22	13	4	5	42	28	+14	52	
4	AS Boufarik	22	11	6	5	31	27	+4	50	
5	USM Blida	22	7	8	7	27	35	−8	44	
6	SCU El Biar	22	7	7	8	37	40	−3	43	
7	RS Alger	22	6	7	9	31	43	−12	41	
8	AS Saint Eugène	22	6	6	10	26	26	0	40	
9	FC Blidéen	22	7	4	11	24	30	−6	40	
10	O. Marengo	22	6	4	12	32	42	−10	38	
11	ASPTT Alger	22	4	5	13	22	40	−18	35	Relegated to 1955–56 Promotion Honor
12	O Hussein Dey	22	5	3	14	24	35	−11	35	Relegated to 1955–56 Promotion Honor

Source: Alger républicain
(C) Champions

=== Promotion Honor ===
Pos	Team	Pld	W	D	L	GF	GA	GD	Pts	Promotion or relegation
1	GS Orléansville (C)	22	16	5	1	43	10	+33	59	Promoted to 1955–56 Division Honor
2	RU Alger	22	11	6	5	35	23	+12	50	Promoted to 1955–56 Division Honor
3	OCB Oued Fodda	22	10	5	7	40	32	+8	47	
4	JS Kabylie	22	9	6	7	36	28	+8	46	
5	NA Hussein Dey	22	7	8	7	40	33	+7	44	
6	OM Saint-Eugène	22	7	8	7	32	41	−9	44	
7	RC Maison Carrée	22	8	6	8	31	22	+9	44	
8	JS El Biar	22	5	9	8	31	25	+6	41	
9	USM Marengo	22	4	11	7	25	33	−8	41	
10	WR Belcourt	22	5	8	9	25	33	−8	40	
11	ÉS Zéralda	22	4	7	11	31	42	−11	37	Relegated to 1955–56 First Division
12	O Littoral	22	3	7	12	17	50	−33	35	Relegated to 1955–56 First Division

Source: L'Écho d'Alger
(C) Champions

=== First Division ===
- Groupe I
- Groupe II
- Groupe III
- Results of Playoffs First Division

=== Second Division ===
- Groupe I
- Groupe II
- Groupe III

Pos	Team	Pld	W	D	L	GF	GA	GD	Pts	Qualification
1	RC Kouba	18	12	4	2	42	23	+19	46	Qualified for Playoffs First Division
2	USM Maison Carrée	18	10	4	4	37	22	+15	42	
3	WA Rivet	18	9	5	4	38	25	+13	41	
4	ASM Barre	18	7	7	4	25	17	+8	39	
5	US Fort-de-l'Eau	18	6	7	5	24	21	+3	37	
6	AST Alger	18	6	5	7	26	28	−2	35	
7	US Aumale	18	5	6	7	35	43	−8	34	
8	SC Algérois	18	5	5	8	18	29	−11	33	
9	Olympique de Rouiba	18	4	2	12	17	27	−10	28	
10	USM Alger	18	2	3	13	12	39	−27	25	Relegated to 1954–55 Second Division

Source: L'Écho d'Alger
- Groupe IV
- Results of Playoffs Second Division

=== Third Division ===
- Groupe I
- Groupe II
- Groupe III
- Groupe IV
- Results of Playoffs Third Division
