= 1953–54 League Algiers =

League Algiers Football Association
- Season: 1953–54
- Champions: GS Alger (DH)
- Relegated: RC Maison Carrée, GS Orléansville (DH)

The 1953–54 League Algiers Football Association season started on September 20, 1953 and ended on May 30, 1954. This is the 32nd edition of the championships.

== Final results ==
=== Division Honneur ===
- Clubs of Division Honneur

The Division Honneur is the highest level of League Algiers Football Association, the equivalent of the elite for this league. It consists of twelve clubs who compete in both the title of "Champion of Division Honneur" and that of "Champion of Algiers", since it is the highest degree.

Pos	Team	Pld	W	D	L	GF	GA	GD	Pts	Qualification or relegation
1	GS Alger (C)	22	14	3	5	42	16	+26	53	Qualified for North African Championship
2	MC Alger	22	11	8	3	33	22	+11	52	
3	AS Boufarik	22	11	7	4	48	32	+16	51	
4	FC Blidéen	22	9	10	3	45	28	+17	50	
5	O. Marengo	22	8	7	7	32	33	−1	45	
6	USM Blida	22	7	7	8	38	33	+5	43	
7	RS Alger	22	6	9	7	30	31	−1	43	
8	S.Guyotville	22	6	8	8	35	42	−7	42	
9	O Hussein Dey	22	6	7	9	33	40	−7	41	
10	AS Saint Eugène	22	4	8	10	27	39	−12	38	
11	RC Maison Carrée	22	4	6	12	24	46	−22	36	Relegated to 1954–55 Promotion Honor
12	GS Orléansville	22	2	8	12	18	40	−22	34	Relegated to 1954–55 Promotion Honor

Source: La Dépêche quotidienne d'Algérie
(C) Champions

=== First Division ===
- Groupe I
- Groupe II

Pos	Team	Pld	W	D	L	GF	GA	GD	Pts	Promotion or relegation
1	ASPTT Alger	18	13	3	2	0	0	0	47	1st of Group II (Note: 1st of Group II and the argument "first tournament" to both get the title of First Division champion and access in Division Honneur)
2	JS Kabylie	18	12	4	2	38	15	+23	46	2nd of Group II (Note: 2nd of Group II and the argument "second tournament" to get the play-off against the last of the "first tournament" and thus access in Division Honneur)
3	RU Alger	18	9	5	4	0	0	0	41	3rd, 4th and 5th of Group II (Note: 3rd, 4th and 5th Group II respectively and compete for the "tournaments third, fourth and fifth "classification matches to access the newly created Promotion Honor)
4	WR Belcourt	18	10	3	5	0	0	0	41	3rd, 4th and 5th of Group II
5	O Tizi Ouzou	18	7	7	4	0	0	0	39	3rd, 4th and 5th of Group II
6	US Fort de l'Eau	18	5	4	9	0	0	0	32	
7	O Rouïba	18	5	3	10	0	0	0	31	
8	JSM Alger	18	4	2	12	0	0	0	28	
9	RC Arbaâ	18	4	2	12	0	0	0	28	9th of Group II (Note: 9th argument and the "Tournament of the ninth" to stay in First Division)
10	AS Rivet	18	4	1	13	0	0	0	27	10th of Group II (Note: 10th argument and the "Tournament of the last" to snatch the playoff against the last of the "Tournament of the ninth" to stay in First Division)

Notes:
- Groupe III

Pos	Team	Pld	W	D	L	GF	GA	GD	Pts	Qualification
1	OCB Oued-Fodda	18	13	2	3	0	0	0	46	Qualified for Playoffs First Division
2	USM Marengo	18	11	5	2	0	0	0	45	
3	Olympique Littoral	18	11	2	5	0	0	0	42	
4	JS El Biar	18	10	3	5	0	0	0	41	
5	RC Kouba	18	9	4	5	0	0	0	40	
6	SC Algérois	18	7	3	8	0	0	0	35	
7	US Blida	18	3	5	10	0	0	0	29	
8	GS Alger Hydra	18	3	4	11	0	0	0	28	
9	USM Alger	18	3	4	11	21	38	−17	28	Relegated to 1954–55 Second Division
10	OM Ruisseau	18	2	4	12	0	0	0	26	Relegated to 1954–55 Second Division

Source: L'Echo d'Alger
- Results of Playoffs First Division

=== Second Division ===
- Groupe I
- Groupe II
- Groupe III
- Groupe IV
- Results of Playoffs Second Division

=== Third Division ===
- Groupe I
- Groupe II
- Groupe III
- Groupe IV
- Results of Playoffs Third Division
