= 1955–56 League Algiers =

League Algiers Football Association
- Season: 1955–56
- Champions: GS Orléansville (DH); O Hussein Dey (PH)
- Relegated: MC Alger, USM Blida (DH); JS Kabylie, OM Saint Eugène (PH)
- Biggest home win: S Guyotville 7–1 O Marengo (29 avril 1956)
- Biggest away win: S Guyotville 0–5 GS Alger (18 septembre 1955)

The League Algiers Football Association 1955–56 season started on September 4, 1955 and ended on June 23, 1956. This is the 34th edition of this league championships which saw the consecration of the Groupement Sportif Orléansville in Division Honneur, Olympique Hussein Dey in Honor Promotion of Montpensier Berre-Sports Association first Division Sporting Club Duperre in Second Division and Entente Sportive Franco Muslim Burdeau in Third Division.

== Final results ==
=== Division Honor ===
Pos	Team	Pld	W	D	L	GF	GA	GD	Pts	Qualification or relegation
1	GS Orléansville (C)	22	13	4	5	0	0	0	52	Qualified for North African Championship
2	AS Boufarik	22	13	4	5	0	0	0	52	
3	GS Alger	22	12	5	5	0	0	0	51	
4	AS Saint Eugène	22	11	5	6	0	0	0	49	
5	Stade Guyotville	22	11	5	6	0	0	0	49	
6	SCU El-Biar	22	10	3	9	0	0	0	45	
7	FC Blidéen	22	8	6	8	0	0	0	44	
8	Olympique Marengo	22	6	2	14	0	0	0	36	
9	RS Alger	20	6	4	10	0	0	0	36	
10	RU Alger	22	4	4	14	0	0	0	34	
11	USM Blida	22	7	3	12	0	0	0	32 (Note: 7 point deducted?)	Relegated to 1956–57 Promotion Honor
12	MC Alger	22	6	5	11	0	0	0	32 (Note: 7 point deducted?)	Relegated to 1956–57 Promotion Honor

(C) Champions

=== Promotion Honneur ===
Pos	Team	Pld	W	D	L	GF	GA	GD	Pts	Qualification or relegation
1	O Hussein-Dey (C)	22	13	4	5	0	0	0	52	Promoted to Division Honneur
2	RC Maison Carrée	22	13	3	6	0	0	0	51	Promoted to Division Honneur
3	O Tizi Ouzou	22	11	4	7	0	0	0	48	
4	JS El Biar	22	10	4	8	0	0	0	46	
5	ASPTT Alger	22	9	2	11	0	0	0	42	
6	OCB Oued Fodda	22	8	4	10	0	0	0	42	
7	RC Kouba	22	9	6	7	0	0	0	41 (Note: 5 points deducted?)	
8	NA Hussein Dey	22	6	6	10	0	0	0	34 (Note: 6 points deducted?)	
9	USM Marengo	22	7	3	12	0	0	0	33	
10	WR Belcourt	22	6	4	12	0	0	0	33	
11	JS Kabylie	22	4	4	14	0	0	0	29	Relegated to 1956–57 Première Division
12	OM Saint-Eugène	22	3	7	12	0	0	0	33 (Note: 2 points deducted?)	Relegated to 1956–57 Première Division

(C) Champions
Notes:

Résultats des matchs du 11 mars 1956 :

   À Saint-Eugène : OMSE bat JSK, 4 à 1
   À El-Biar : RCMC bat WRB, 2 à 0
   À Kouba : RCK et OHD font match nul, 0 à 0
   À Hussein-Dey : ASPTT bat NAHD, 1 à 0
   À Bordj-Menaïel : JSEB bat OTO, 2 à 1
   À Oued-Fodda : OCEOF bat USMM, 1 à 0

=== First Division ===
- Groupe I
- Groupe II
- Groupe III
- Results of Playoffs First Division

=== Second Division ===
- Groupe I
- Groupe II
- Groupe III
- Groupe IV
- Results of Playoffs Second Division

=== Third Division ===
- Groupe I
- Groupe II
- Groupe III
- Groupe IV
- Results of Playoffs Third Division

"Ajout du résultat ASR – USMA du 11 mars 1956"

Troisième groupe ASR 7 – USMA 0 L'ASR a largement dominé la rencontre face à une équipe de l'USMA méconnaissable. Dès les premières minutes, l'ASR a imposé un rythme élevé, prenant rapidement l'avantage grâce à une attaque bien organisée et une défense solide. L'USMA, en manque d'inspiration et de solutions offensives, n'a jamais réussi à inverser la tendance. Les joueurs de l'ASR ont multiplié les offensives et ont concrétisé leurs occasions avec une grande efficacité.

"Ajout du résultat JUA– CCA du 11 mars 1956"

Troisième groupe JUA 3 – CCA 1 L’équipe du JUA a réussi à s’imposer face au CCA grâce à une performance solide et bien maîtrisée. Le CCA a pourtant bien débuté le match en ouvrant le score rapidement, mais le JUA a su réagir avec une attaque efficace et une défense compacte. En seconde période, le JUA a pris le dessus physiquement, marquant deux buts supplémentaires pour sceller la victoire.
