= 1949–50 League Algiers =

League Algiers Football Association
- Season: 1949–50
- Champions: O Hussein Dey (DH)
- Relegated: USO Mitidja, RC Maison Carrée (DH)
- Top goalscorer: Dahmane Meftah (FC Blida) (18)

The 1949–50 League Algiers Football Association season started on September 25, 1949 and ended on May 28, 1950. This is the 28th edition of the championships.

== Final results ==
=== Division Honneur ===
- Clubs of Division Honneur

The Division Honneur is the highest level of League Algiers Football Association, the equivalent of the elite for this league. It consists of twelve clubs who compete in both the title of "Champion of Division Honneur" and that of "Champion of Algiers", since it is the highest degree.

Pos	Team	Pld	W	D	L	GF	GA	GD	Pts	Qualification or relegation
1	O Hussein Dey (C)	22	13	4	5	36	21	+15	52	Qualified for North African Championship
2	AS Saint Eugène	22	13	3	6	44	28	+16	51	
3	GS Alger	22	12	4	6	31	17	+14	50	
4	FC Blidéen	22	11	4	7	30	24	+6	48	
5	S.Guyotville	22	9	8	5	25	24	+1	48	
6	MC Alger	22	6	10	6	23	23	0	44	
7	RS Alger	22	7	7	8	29	31	−2	43	
8	USM Blida	22	6	9	7	29	28	+1	43	
9	AS Boufarik	22	8	4	10	30	29	+1	42	
10	RU Alger	22	8	4	10	26	30	−4	42	
11	USO Mitidja	22	3	5	14	22	47	−25	33	Relegated to 1950–51 First Division
12	RC Maison Carrée	22	2	6	14	20	43	−23	32	Relegated to 1950–51 First Division

(C) Champions

=== First Division ===
- Groupe I
  - SCU El Biar, O Tizi Ouzou, AS Douéra, US Fort-de-l'Eau, O Rouiba, USM Alger, AS Rivet, AS Kouba, JS Birtouta, OM Saint Eugène.

=== Groupe I ===
Pos	Team	Pld	W	D	L	F	A	GD	Pts	Notes
1	US Fort-de-l'eau	18	0	0	0	0	0	0	46	
2	O. Tizi Ouzou	18	0	0	0	0	0	0	44	
3	OM Saint Eugène	18	0	0	0	0	0	0	41	
4	AS Kouba	18	0	0	0	0	0	0	39	
5	USM Alger	18	7	6	5	28	25	+3	38	
6	SCU El Biar	18	0	0	0	0	0	0	33	
7	JS Birtouta	18	0	0	0	0	0	0	32	
8	Olympique Rouiba	18	0	0	0	0	0	0	32	
8	AS Rivet	18	0	0	0	0	0	0	29	
10	AS Douéra	18	0	0	0	0	0	0	26	

- Groupe II
  - SC Alger, WA Boufarik, O Littoral, ASPTT Alger, O Marengo, GSA Hydra, GS Orléansville, US Blida, ES Zéralda, USM Maison-Carré.

=== Groupe II ===
Pos	Team	Pld	W	D	L	F	A	GD	Pts	Notes
1	Olymique Marengo	18	0	0	0	0	0	0	48	
2	GS Orléansville	18	0	0	0	0	0	0	43	
3	WA Boufarik	18	0	0	0	0	0	0	39	
4	SC Algérois	18	0	0	0	0	0	0	36	
5	Olympique Littoral	18	0	0	0	0	0	0	34	
6	ASPTT Alger	18	0	0	0	0	0	0	33	
7	USM Maison Carré	18	0	0	0	0	0	0	33	
8	GSA Hydra	18	0	0	0	0	0	0	32	
9	US Blida	18	0	0	0	0	0	0	32	
10	ES Zéralda	18	0	0	0	0	0	0	30	

- Results of Playoffs First Division

=== Second Division ===
- Groupe I
- Groupe II
- Groupe III
- Groupe IV
- Results of Playoffs Second Division

=== Third Division ===
- Groupe I
- Groupe II
- Groupe III
- Groupe IV
- Results of Playoffs Third Division
