= 1951–52 League Algiers =

League Algiers Football Association
- Season: 1951–52
- Champions: AS Saint Eugène (DH)
- Relegated: GS Alger, USM Marengo (DH)

The 1951–52 League Algiers Football Association season started on September 23, 1951 and ended on June 8, 1952. This is the 30th edition of the championships.

== Final results ==
=== Division Honneur ===
- Clubs of Division Honneur

The Division Honneur is the highest level of League Algiers Football Association, the equivalent of the elite for this league. It consists of twelve clubs who compete in both the title of "Champion of Division Honneur" and that of "Champion of Algiers", since it is the highest degree.

Pos	Team	Pld	W	D	L	GF	GA	GD	Pts	Qualification or relegation
1	AS Saint Eugène (C)	22	8	13	1	43	24	+19	51	Qualified for North African Championship
2	MC Alger	22	9	10	3	34	30	+4	50	
3	RS Alger	22	10	7	5	32	35	−3	49	
4	O Hussein Dey	22	11	4	7	45	33	+12	48	
5	AS Boufarik	22	8	8	6	39	41	−2	45 (Note: 1 point deducted?)	
6	FC Blidéen	22	8	8	6	52	32	+20	45	
7	RU Alger	22	7	7	8	27	31	−4	43	
8	S.Guyotville	22	5	10	7	30	32	−2	42	
9	GS Orléansville	22	6	7	9	38	41	−3	41	
10	USM Blida	22	6	7	9	28	30	−2	41	
11	GS Alger	22	4	8	10	32	44	−12	38	Relegated to 1952–53 First Division
12	USM Marengo	22	4	3	15	24	55	−31	33	Relegated to 1952–53 First Division

(C) Champions

=== First Division ===
1951–52 Group A League Algiers Standings.

- Groupe I
- Groupe II
- Groupe III

Pos	Team	Pld	W	D	L	GF	GA	GD	Pts	Promotion or relegation
1	O. Marengo (C)	18	13	5	0	0	0	0	46 (Note: 3 points deducted?)	Qualified for the "Tournament of the first" (Note: Champion, qualified for the "Tournament of the first" and fight both the title of First Division Champion and accession in Division Honneur. Also note that the second of this tournament is crowned Vice-champion and also accessed by higher division.)
2	O. Littoral	17	11	4	2	0	0	0	43	Qualified for the "second tournament" (Note: Vice-Champion, qualified for the "second tournament" qualifying the dam third place against the last of the "first of the tournament," is the last place in the Accession Division Honneur. This classification match is honorary because that means the barrage also third in the First Division)
3	US Fort de l'Eau	18	9	6	3	0	0	0	42	
4	WA Boufarik	18	9	5	4	0	0	0	41	
5	AS Kouba	18	6	9	3	0	0	0	39	
6	JS Kabylie	18	5	4	9	35	33	+2	32	
7	USM Maison Carrée	18	3	7	8	0	0	0	31	
8	CC Alger	18	3	4	11	0	0	0	28	
9	AS Montpensier Berre	18	1	7	10	0	0	0	27	Relegation zone (Note: Second last, relegation zone, is playing the "Tournament of the ninth" last chance not to go down to the second division, " 2F/A ". The first two of this tournament are saved.)
10	JSM Alger	18	3	3	12	0	0	0	27	Relegation zone (Note: Last, second and last relegation, fight the "tenths of tournament," the winner of this tournament is playing a dam against the last of the "ninth of the tournament," sort of "barrier" not to go down to the second division " 2F/A ")

(C) Champions
Notes:
- Results of Playoffs First Division

=== Second Division ===
- Groupe I
- Groupe II
- Groupe III
- Groupe IV
- Results of Playoffs Second Division

=== Third Division ===
- Groupe I
- Groupe II
- Groupe III
- Groupe IV
- Results of Playoffs Third Division
