= Henri Salvano =

French footballer

Personal information
- Full name: Henri Michel Salvano
- Date of birth: 22 August 1901
- Place of birth: Blida, Algeria
- Date of death: 15 May 1964 (aged 62)
- Place of death: Dijon, France
- Position: Forward

Senior career*
Years	Team	Apps	(Gls)
1922–1929	Blida		

International career
1926	France	1	(1)
- * Club domestic league appearances and goals

Henri Michel Salvano (22 August 1901 – 15 May 1964) was a French footballer who played as a forward for Blida and the French national team in the 1920s.

== Biography ==
Henri Lesur was born in Blida, Algeria, on 22 August 1901, and he played most of his career at FC Blida, doing so between 1922 and 1919. He helped his club win the North African Championship twice, in 1923 and 1929, as well as the Coupe Steeg in 1929.

On 18 April 1926, the 25-year-old Salvano earned his first (and only) international cap for France in a friendly match against Portugal at Toulouse, in front of 16,000 spectators, helping his side to a 4–2 win. He played the entire match as a starter, and scored the opening goal of the match in the 16th minute, a header following a cross from his club teammate, Georges Bonello.

== Career statistics ==
France score listed first, score column indicates score after each Salvano goal.

List of international goals scored by Henri Salvano
No.	Date	Venue	Opponent	Score	Result	Competition
1	18 April 1926	Ponts Jumeaux, Toulouse, France	Portugal	1–0	4–2	Friendly match

== Honours ==
Blida

- North African Championship:
  - Champions (2): 1923 and 1929
- Coupe Steeg:
  - Champions (1): 1929
