= Norrie Haywood =

Scottish footballer

Norrie Haywood was a Scottish professional footballer who played as a forward. He played for Watford F.C., Queen of the South, Peebles Rovers, Raith Rovers and St Bernard's F.C.

== Career ==
In 1935, George McLachlan became Queen of the South manager and in May 1936 he took Queens on an eleven-game tour to France, Luxembourg and Algeria. In France they played against such teams as Montpellier HSC (losing 4–2) and Stade Reims (winning 5–4).

The tour included competing in a four team invitational tournament in Algiers. With Algeria then under French colonial rule the official programme listed the venue as "Stade-Velodrome Municipal d'Alger" and the participants as:

Home side Racing Universitaire d'Alger (R.U.A. for whom Nobel Prize winning author-philosopher Albert Camus had played in goals for its junior team) had already won both the North African Champions Cup and the North African Cup in the 1930s (R.U.A. would win each twice by the decade's end). Goals by Willie Thomson and Joe Tulip (the Northumbrian was one of the first Englishmen to play in the Scottish League) saw Queens book a place in the invitational tournament final with a 2–1 victory against them.

In the final Queens faced a Racing de Santander side who had just finished 4th in Spain's La Liga notching home and away double victories against both Real Madrid and F.C. Barcelona. Norrie Haywood's goal and a 1–0 scoreline saw victory for La Belle Equipe Ecossaise. The trophy can still be seen in QoS' club museum today.
