= Pierre Chesneau =

French footballer (born 1902)

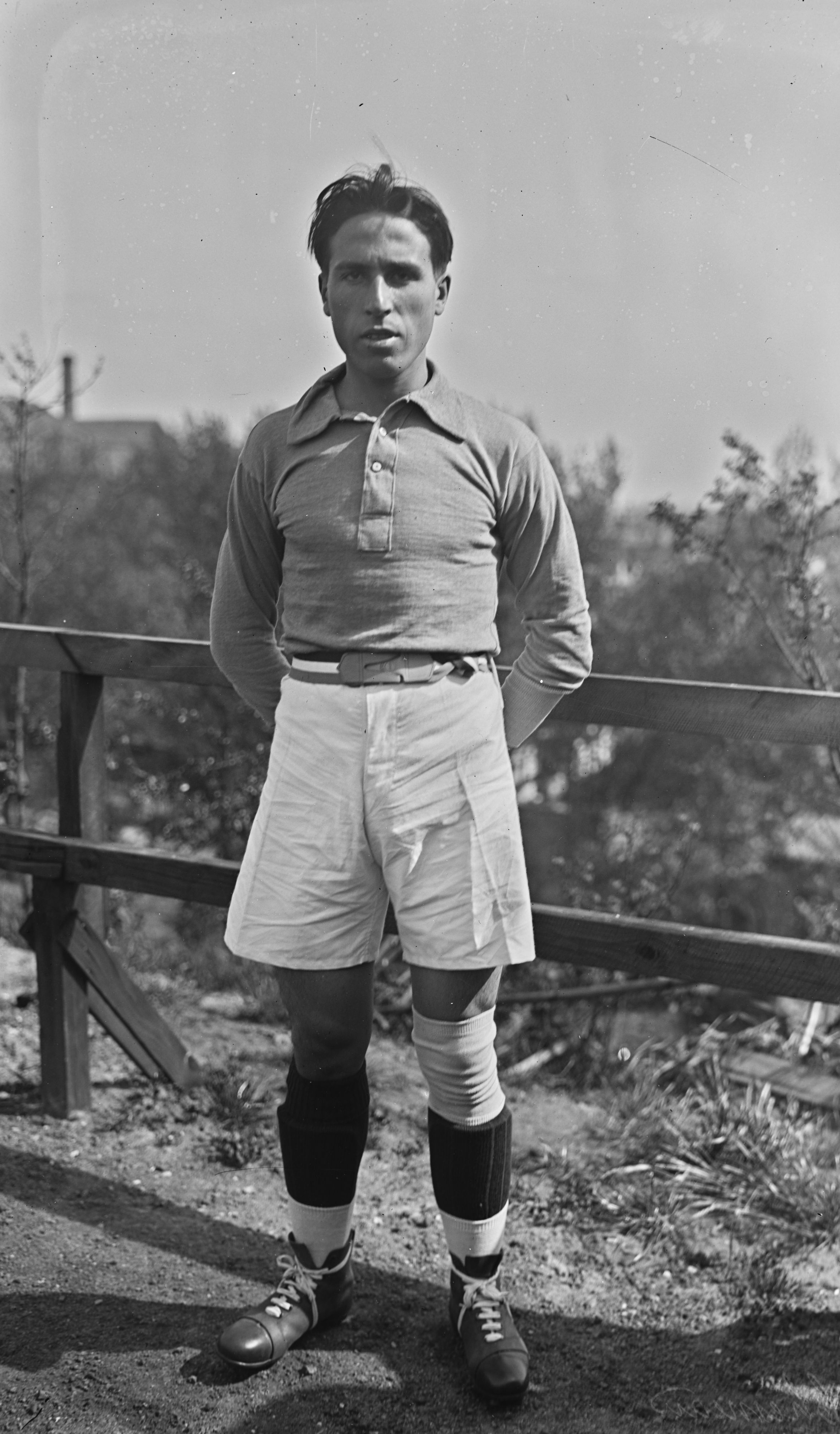

Personal information
- Date of birth: 10 April 1902

International career
Years	Team	Apps	(Gls)
1924	France	1	(0)

Pierre Chesneau (born 10 April 1902, date of death unknown) was a French footballer. He played in one match for the France national football team in 1924.
