= FC Blida =

Former Algerian football club

- Full name: Football Club Blida
- Nickname: The Dean
- Founded: 4 October 1904
- Dissolved: 1962
- Ground: FCB Stadium, Blida
- Capacity: 3.000
Home colours

The Football club Blida, commonly abbreviated as FC Blida or FCB, is a former Algerian football club based in Blida.

Formed on 4 October 1904, FC Blida became known, The Dean teams of the Algiers. The club won six titles including the Algiers champion of Division Honor, four Forconi Cup, two Championship and North African Cup.

During the independence of Algeria in 1962, FCB was dissolved like most other clubs.

== History ==
founded in 1904 in Blida, was one of the earliest football clubs in North Africa. Known as “The Dean”, the club earned this title due to its age, heritage, and influence on the development of football in the region.

Throughout the early and mid-20th century, FC Blida competed in regional and North African competitions, achieving notable results. The club won multiple Algiers Division Honor titles and secured important trophies such as the North African Championship and the North African Cup. The club won several regional titles during this period.

FC Blida is often referred to as the “Dean of North African clubs”, a title that reflects its status as one of the oldest football clubs in the region. The club was founded in 1904 and competed in regional football across North Africa.

Beyond its achievements, the club participated in spreading football in the Blida region. However, its journey came to an end in 1962 following Algerian independence, when many colonial-era clubs were dissolved and the football system was reorganized.

Despite its disappearance, FC Blida is remembered as one of the earliest football clubs in Algeria and North Africa.

== Stadium ==
The FCB Stadium was inaugurated in 1924. After 1962 the stadium was renamed Zoubir Zouraghi Stadium (Stade Chahid Zoubir Zouraghi). It have a capacity of 3,000 places.

== Honours ==
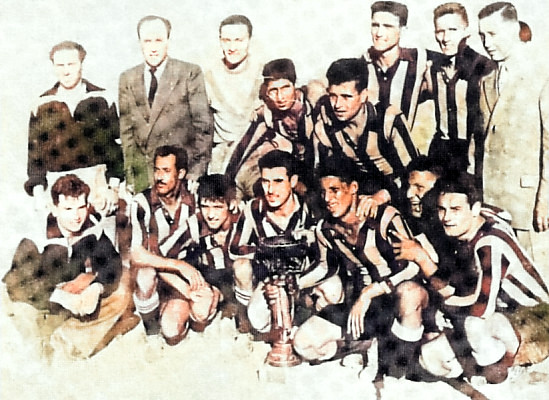
Final of North African Cup 1952 Stand Up (L-R) : Samary Yvon, Bachelu Georges, Reynaud, Schmitt (coach), Camand, Gasque, Riera (Captain) et Mercadal (Vice President). Sitting (L-R) : Arnaud Guy, Hasni, Giner, Sic ard, Dahmane Meftah, Rais et Ruiz

=== Domestic competitions ===
- League Algiers Football Association

Champion (6): 1921, 1922, 1923, 1924, 1929 and 1953.

- Forconi Cup

Winner (4): 1946, 1952, 1954 and 1957.

=== International competitions ===
- North African Championship

Winner (1): 1923 and 1929.

- North African Cup

Winner (1): 1952

== Notable players ==
- (France) Pierre Chesneau
- (France) Georges Bonello
- (France) Henri Salvano
- (France) Georges Riera
- (France) Claude Sicard
- (France) Charly Camand
- (France) Guy Zaragozi
- (France) Alain Torres
- (France) Tonio Torres
- (France) Bernard Rahis
- (France) Armand Libérati
- (France) Sauveur Rodriguez
- (Algeria) Dahmane Meftah
- (Algeria) Djilali Hasni
