= Forconi Cup =

Coupe Edmond Forconi
- Founded: 1942
- Region: France Algeria
- Most championships: FC Blida; GS Alger; O Hussein Dey (3 titles each)

The Forconi Cup, also called Coupe Edmond Forconi was an Organized in 1942 to 1962, open to all clubs affiliated to the League Algiers Football Association. Regional level as for all Algiers department, the competition to determine the qualified clubs in the area for the North African Cup, inter-regional competition.

The competition, which follows other departmental cuts of the same league, takes place for almost a decade. His editions are paired with the qualifications for the North African Cup and resist the enthusiasm aroused after 1957 the permission of North African clubs to compete in the Coupe de France, as the Algerian Cup in 1957. Finally the cup disappears in 1962 with the independence of Algeria.

== Key ==
Key to list of winners
(R)	Replay
*	Match went to extra time
	Match decided by a penalty shootout after extra time
	Winning team won the Double

=== Results ===
Forconi Cup winners
Season	Dates	Winners	Score	Runners–up	Venue
1939–40	June 9, 1940	RU Alger	2–1	MC Alger	Stade Municipal d'Alger, Hamma-Anassers
1940–41	May 4, 1941	RU Alger	4–1	RC Maison Carrée	Stade Municipal d'Alger, Hamma-Anassers
1942–43	May 1, 1943	AS Saint Eugène	2–1	RS Alger	Stade Municipal d'Alger, Hamma-Anassers
1944–45	February 4, 1945	USM Blida	1–0	RS Alger	Stade Municipal d'Alger, Hamma-Anassers
1945–46	May 11, 1946	FC Blida	1–0	GS Alger	Stade Municipal d'Alger, Hamma-Anassers
1946–47	June 1, 1947	RS Alger	2–1	O Hussein Dey	Stade Communal Saint-Eugène, Saint-Eugène
1947–48	June 3, 1948	MC Alger	5–3	AS Saint Eugène	Stade Communal Saint-Eugène, Saint-Eugène
1948–49	May 25, 1949	GS Alger	1–1	AS Saint Eugène	Stade Communal Saint-Eugène, Saint-Eugène
1949–50	June 18, 1950	O Hussein Dey	2–0	FC Blida	Stade Communal Saint-Eugène, Saint-Eugène
1950–51	June 3, 1951	MC Alger	3–2	AS Saint Eugène	Stade Communal Saint-Eugène, Saint-Eugène
1951–52	June 15, 1952	FC Blida	3–1	MC Alger	Stade Communal Saint-Eugène, Saint-Eugène
1952–53	May 24, 1953	RC Maison Carrée	4–2	FC Blida	Stade Communal Saint-Eugène, Saint-Eugène
1953–54	April 4, 1954	O Hussein Dey	3–2	RC Maison Carrée	
1954–55	March 31, 1955	AS Saint Eugène	2–1	RS Alger	
1955–56	April 29, 1956	RC Maison Carrée	4–0	SCU El Biar	
1956–57	June 2, 1957	FC Blida	1–0	RC Maison Carrée	Stade de Boufarik, Boufarik
1957–58	May 26, 1958	O Hussein Dey	3–1	RU Alger	
1958–59	May 7, 1959	GS Alger	3–1	GS Orléansville	Stade d'El Biar, El Biar
1959–60	June 12, 1960	GS Alger	3–1	RU Alger	Stade Communal Saint-Eugène, Saint-Eugène
1960–61		RC Maison Carrée	4–2	FC Blida	
1961–62					

== Performance by club ==
Rank	Club	Winners	Runners-up	Winning years
1	FC Blida	3	3	1946, 1952, 1957
2	RC Maison Carrée	3	3	1953, 1956, 1961
3	GS Alger	3	1	1949, 1959, 1960
4	O Hussein Dey	3	1	1950, 1954, 1958
5	AS Saint Eugène	2	3	1943, 1955
6	MC Alger	2	2	1948, 1951
7	RU Alger	2	2	1940, 1941
8	RS Alger	1	3	1947
9	USM Blida	1	0	1946

== See also ==
- League Algiers Football Association
- Coupe de France
