= League Algiers Football Association =

- Founded: 1919
- Folded: 1962 due to fall of France after 38 seasons
- Country: France Algeria
- Number of clubs: varied
- Level on pyramid: 1
- Domestic cup(s): Forconi Cup; Coupe de France
- Last champions: O Hussein Dey (1958–59)
- Most championships: Gallia Sport d'Alger (8)

The League Algiers Football Association, also called League Algiers Football or League of Algiers was an organization of soccer in Algeria to the French colonial era. Founded in 1920 in order to develop the colonial football to Algiers; She paused for a moment due to World War II, then resumed in 1946. Eventually it will cease all activities in 1962 after the end of the War of Algeria who devoted the independence of the Algeria and which led to the mass exodus of settlers to France signifier abandonment of sports clubs run by the "settlers" and their structures.

Affiliated to the French Football Federation with four other leagues in North Africa that are leagues: the Constantine of Oran of Tunisia and Morocco; League Algiers so possessed as his four sisters the status of "league" or "Championship" amateur, and had four divisions that corresponded to the seventh, sixth, fifth and fourth division of French football.

These leagues so were the main football regions in North Africa from cutting the French colonial administration. They were very structured and very hierarchical and organized competitions for all age categories in addition to a so-called "corporate" (or category Championship "corporate" or company), the highest level was called Division of Honor .

== League participation ==
36 clubs have participated. Note: from 1920–21 to 1955–56 season.

- 36 seasons: AS Saint Eugène, FC Blida
- 35 seasons: Association Sportive Boufarik, Gallia Sports Algiers
- 26 seasons: RU Alger
- 22 seasons: GS Orléansville, Olympique d'Hussein-Dey, Red Star Algiers
- 21 seasons: Racing Club Maison-Carrée (1954), US Ouest-Mitidja
- 20 seasons: MC Alger (1956)
- 19 seasons: Union Sportive Blida (1947)
- 11 seasons: USM Blida (1956)
- 9 seasons: Olympique de Marengo
- 7 seasons: Sporting Club Union El Biar, Stade Guyotville
- 5 seasons: Racing Club Algiers (1927)
- 4 seasons: Association Sportive de Montpensier (1929)
- 3 seasons: Club Sportif Algiers (1923)
- 2 seasons: Elan Bab El Oued (1928), Football Club d'El Affroun (1927), Olympique de Tizi-Ouzou (1939), Stary Standard Club (1922)
- 1 season: Association Sportive Algiers (1921), Etoile Stary Marine Algiers (1922), Marine Sportive Algiers (1923), Jeunesse sportive de Mouzaiaville (1927),USM Marengo (1952), ASPTT Alger (1955).

== Champions of Honor Division (DH) of the League Algiers ==
- DH Championship League Algiers Centre Football Association (LAFA)

Season	Team	Season	Team	Season	Team	Season	Team
1920–1921 Season	FC Blida	1930–1931 Season	AS Boufarik	1940–1941 Season	Not Played (War)	1950–1951 Season	GS Algiers
1921–1922 Season	FC Blida	1931–1932 Season	GS Algiers	1941–1942 Season	AS Boufarik	1951–1952 Season	AS Saint Eugène
1922–1923 Season	FC Blida	1932–1933 Season	AS Boufarik	1942–1943 Season	AS Saint Eugène	1952–1953 Season	FC Blida
1923–1924 Season	FC Blida	1933–1934 Season	RU Algiers	1943–1944 Season	AS Saint Eugène	1953–1954 Season	GS Algiers
1924–1925 Season	AS Boufarik	1934-1935 Season	RU Algiers	1944-1945 season	Unassigned	1954–1955 Season	GS Algiers
1925–1926 Season	US Blida	1935–1936 Season	AS Saint Eugène	1945-1946 Season	RU Algiers	1955–1956 Season	GS Orléansville
1926–1927 Season	GS Orléansville	1936–1937 Season	GS Algiers	1946–1947 Season	GS Algiers	1956–1957 Season	AS Saint Eugène
1927–1928 Season	GS Algiers	1937–1938 Season	AS Boufarik	1947–1948 Season	O Hussein-Dey	1957–1958 Season	GS Algiers
1928–1929 Season	FC Blida	1938–1939 Season	RU Algiers	1948–1949 Season	O Hussein-Dey	1958–1959 Season	O Hussein-Dey
1929–1930 Season	AS Saint Eugène	1939–1940 Season	Not Played (War)	1949–1950 Season	O Hussein-Dey	1959–1960 Season	(training CFA)

== Titles by club ==
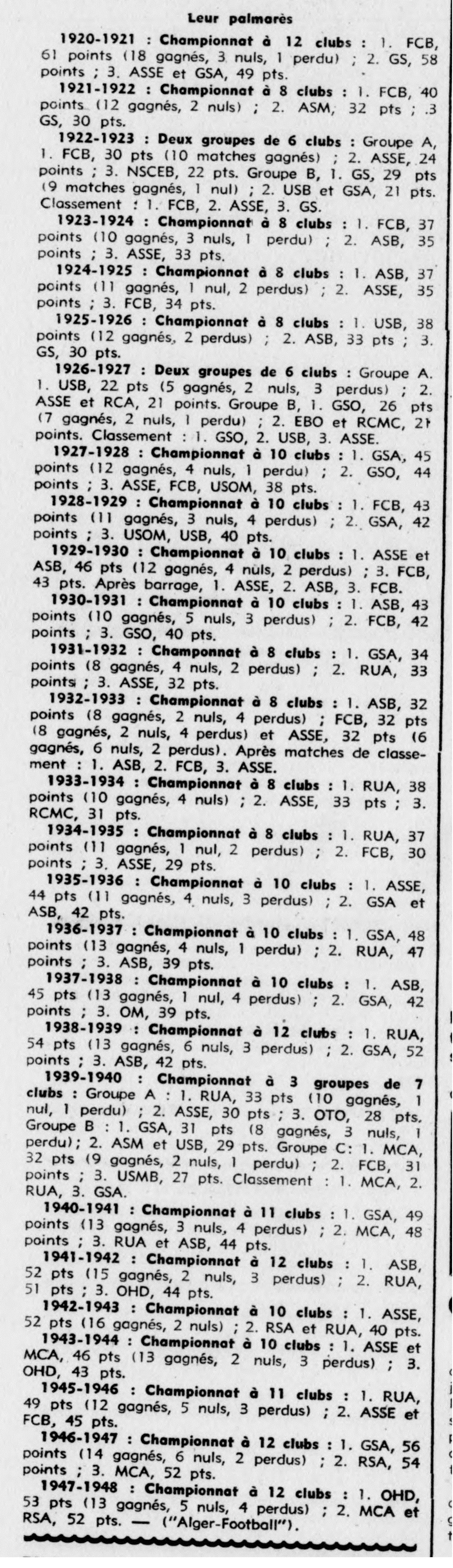

Club	Winners	Winning seasons
GS Algiers	8	1927–28, 1931–32, 1936–37, 1946–47, 1950–51, 1953–54, 1954–55, 1957–58
AS Saint Eugène	6	1929–30, 1935–36, 1942–43, 1943–44, 1951–52, 1956–57
FC Blida	6	1920–21, 1921–22, 1922–23, 1923–24, 1928–29, 1952–53
AS Boufarik	5	1924–25, 1932–33, 1930–31, 1937–38, 1941–42
O Hussein-Dey	4	1947–48, 1948–49, 1949–50, 1958–59
RU Algiers	4	1933–34, 1934–35, 1938–39, 1945–46
GS Orléansville	2	1926–27, 1955–56
US Blida	1	1925–26

== See also ==
- Forconi Cup
- Coupe de France
