= AS Saint Eugène =

- Full name: Association sportive saint eugénoise
- Founded: 1 January 1908
- Dissolved: 1962
- Ground: Stade Omar Hammadi, Bologhine
- Capacity: 6.000
| Home colours | Away colours |

The Sports Association saint-eugénoise, commonly abbreviated as AS Saint-Eugène or ASSE, is a former Algerian football club based in Algiers, in the municipality of Bologhine, known at the time as Saint-Eugène.

Formed on 1 January 1908, AS Saint Eugène became known, from 1930, as one of the notorious teams of the Algiers. The club won seven titles including the Algiers champion of Division Honor and a Championship and North African Cup.

During the independence of Algeria in 1962, ASSE was dissolved like most other clubs that were founded by European settlers.

== Honours ==
=== Domestic competitions ===
- League Algiers Football Association

Champion (6): 1930, 1936, 1943, 1944, 1952, 1957

- Forconi Cup

Winner (1): 1955

=== International competitions ===
- North African Championship

Winner (1): 1930

- North African Cup

Winner (1): 1950
