= North African Championship =

ULNA Champions League
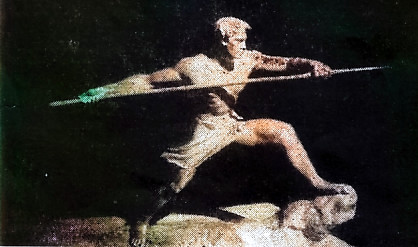
- The Last Trophy (1946–1956)
- Founded: 1920
- Abolished: 1956
- Region: North Africa (ULNA)
- Teams: 6 teams
- Last champions: (Algeria) (France) ESFM Guelma
- Most championships: (Algeria) (France) SC Bel Abbès (7 times)

The North African Championship, commonly referred as ULNA Champions League is an old football competition organized in North Africa since 1920 to 1956, it pits only the champions of the North African Leagues against each other at the end of the season to set the African Champion. It disappears at the end of the 1955–56 edition.

== Winners of unofficial edition ==
Was organized by the Union of French Athletic Sports Societies (UFASS).

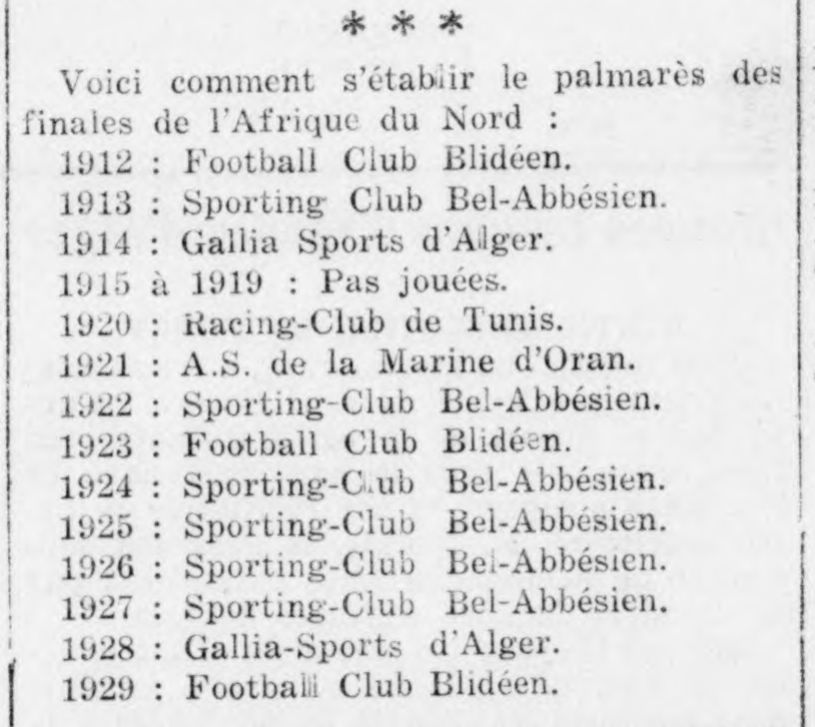

- 1912 : FC Blida (Blida)
- 1913 : SC Bel Abbès (Sidi Bel Abbès)
- 1914 : Gallia SA (Algiers)
- 1915–1919 : Not played.

== Winners of the official competition ==
Was organized by the Union of North-African Football Leagues, hosted by the FIFA.

Year	Home team	Score	Away team	Venue	Attendance
1920	(Tunisia); Racing Club Tunis	2 – 1	(Algeria); AS Marine Oran	..., Algiers	
1921	(Algeria); AS Marine Oran	3 – 1	(Algeria); FC Blida	..., Algiers	
1922	(Algeria); SC Bel Abbès	4 – 1	(Algeria); RC Philippeville	..., Philippeville	
1923	(Algeria); FC Blida	1 – 0	(Algeria); SC Bel Abbès	..., Algiers	
1924	(Algeria); SC Bel Abbès	3 – 1	(Algeria); FC Blida	..., Algiers	
1925	(Algeria); SC Bel Abbès	2 – 0	(Tunisia); Stade Gaulois Tunis	Stade des Oliviers, Sidi Bel Abbès	
1926	(Algeria); SC Bel Abbès	3 – 0	(Tunisia); SC Tunis	..., Tunis	
1927	(Algeria); SC Bel Abbès	3 – 0	(Algeria); JS Philippeville	Stade des Oliviers, Sidi Bel Abbès	
1928	(Algeria); Gallia Sports Alger	3 – 2 (aet)	(Algeria); SC Bel Abbès	..., Algiers	
1929	(Algeria); FC Blida	1 – 0 (aet)	(Algeria); Gallia Sports Alger	..., Algiers	
1930	(Algeria); AS Saint Eugène	3 – 0	(Morocco); OM Rabat	Stade Belvédère, Rabat	
1931	(Algeria); CDJ Oran	3 – 2 (aet)	(Morocco); CS Marocain	Stade Alenda, Oran	
1932	(Morocco); USM Casablanca	4 – 1	(Algeria); Gallia Club Oran	Stade Philip, Casablanca	
1933	(Morocco); USM Casablanca	3 – 0	(Algeria); USM Oran	Stade Alenda, Oran	
1934	(Morocco); USM Casablanca	2 – 0	(Tunisia); US Tunis	Stade Philip, Casablanca	
1935	(Algeria); RU Alger	2 – 1	(Algeria); USM Oran	..., Algiers	
1936	(Algeria); Gallia Club Oran	5 – 0	(Algeria); AS Saint Eugène	Stade Alenda, Oran	
1937	(Algeria); Gallia Sports Alger	3 – 2	(Algeria); CDJ Oran	..., Algiers	
1938	(Algeria); JAC Bône	3 – 1	(Morocco); USM Casablanca	Stade Municipal Paul Pantaloni, Bône	
1939	(Algeria); RU Alger	2 – 1	(Morocco); USM Casablanca	..., Algiers	
1940	not held (Note: The competition were cancelled because of the Second World War)				
1941	not held				
1942	(Morocco); USM Casablanca	4 – 1	(Algeria); CDJ Oran	Stade Philip, Casablanca	
1943	not held				
1944	not held				
1945	not held				
1946	(Algeria); FC Oran	2 – 1	(Morocco); USM Casablanca	Stade Vincent Monréal, Oran	
1947	(Algeria); Gallia Sports Alger	2 – 0	(Algeria); SC Bel Abbès	..., Algiers	
1948	(Morocco); Wydad AC	4 – 2	(Morocco); USA Casablanca	Stade Philip, Casablanca	
1949	(Morocco); Wydad AC	3 – 0	(Algeria); MO Constantine	Stade Philip, Casablanca	
1950	(Morocco); Wydad AC	4 – 0	(Algeria); USM Oran	Stade Vincent Monréal, Oran	
1951	(Algeria); Gallia Sports Alger	1 – 0	(Tunisia); CS Hammam-Lif	..., Algiers	
1952	(Morocco); USM Casablanca	2 – 0	(Algeria); AS Saint Eugène	..., Algiers	
1953	(Algeria); SC Bel Abbès	4 – 0	(Algeria); FC Blida	Stade Vincent Monréal, Oran	
1954	(Algeria); SC Bel Abbès	6 – 1	(Tunisia); CS Hammam-Lif	Stade Vincent Monréal, Oran	
1955	(Algeria); ESFM Guelma	2 – 1 (aet)	(Morocco); Wydad AC	Stade Philip, Casablanca	
1956	not held				

== Winners by team ==
Num	Club	Winners	Runners-up
1	(Algeria) SC Bel Abbès	7 (1922, 1924, 1925, 1926, 1927, 1953, 1954)	3 (1923, 1928, 1947)
2	(Morocco) USM Casablanca	5 (1932, 1933, 1934, 1942, 1952)	3 (1938, 1939, 1946)
3	(Algeria) Gallia Sport d'Alger	4 (1928, 1937, 1947, 1951)	1 (1929)
4	(Morocco) Wydad AC	3 (1948, 1949, 1950)	1 (1955)
5	(Algeria) FC Blida	2 (1923, 1929)	3 (1921, 1924, 1953)
6	(Algeria) RU Alger	2 (1935, 1939)	0
7	(Algeria) AS Saint Eugène	1 (1930)	2 (1936, 1952)
7	(Algeria) CDJ Oran	1 (1931)	2 (1937, 1942
9	(Algeria) Gallia Club Oran	1 (1936)	1 (1932)
10	(Tunisia) Racing Club Tunis	1 (1920)	0
10	(Algeria) AS Marine Oran	1 (1921)	0
10	(Algeria) JAC Bône	1 (1938)	0
10	(Algeria) FC Oran	1 (1946)	0
10	(Algeria) ES Guelma	1 (1955)	0
15	(Algeria) USM Oran	0	3 (1933, 1935, 1950)
16	(Morocco) USA Casablanca	0	2 (1948, 1949)
16	(Tunisia) CS Hammam-Lif	0	2 (1951, 1954)
18	(Algeria) RC Philippeville	0	1 (1922)
18	(Tunisia) Stade Gaullois Tunis	0	1 (1925)
18	(Tunisia) SC Tunis	0	1 (1926)
18	(Algeria) JS Phillipville	0	1 (1927)
18	(Morocco) OM Rabat	0	1 (1930)
18	(Morocco) Stade Marocain	0	1 (1931)
18	(Tunisia) US Tunisienne	0	1 (1934)

NTB:

- ES Guelma (ex. ESFM Guelma)

== Winners by nation ==
Num	Nation	Winners	Runners-up
1	(Algeria) (France) Oran (department)	11	9
2	(Algeria) (France) Alger (department)	9	7
3	Morocco	8	7
4	(Algeria) (France) Constantine (department)	2	2
5	Tunisia	1	2
