= Racing Universitaire d'Alger =

Former Algerian multi-sports club

Racing Universitaire d'Alger (in Arabic: فريق جامعة الجزائر) is a former multi sports club formed in 1927 in Algiers, Algeria.

== The Algiers invitational tournament 1936 ==
In 1936 R.U.A. were the home side in a four team invitational tournament. With Algeria then under French colonial rule the official programme listed the venue as "Stade-Velodrome Municipal d'Alger" and the participants as:

- Le Queen of the South - La Belle Equipe Ecossaise de Première Division
- Racing-Club de Santander - Favori des Championnats d'Espagne
- Floriana F. C. de Malte - Champion Officiel et Vainqueur de la Coupe
- R.U.A. - Champion de l'Afrique du Nord 1935

The match days were 21 May and 24 May.

R.U.A. had already won both the North African Champions Cup and the North African Cup in the 1930s (R.U.A. would win each twice by the decade's end). Goals by Willie Thomson and Joe Tulip (the Northumbrian was one of the first Englishmen to play in the Scottish League) saw Queens book a place in the invitational tournament final with a 2–1 victory against them.

In the final Queens faced a Racing de Santander side who had just finished 4th in Spain's La Liga notching home and away double victories against both Real Madrid and F.C. Barcelona. Norrie Haywood's goal and a 1–0 scoreline saw victory for Queen of the South.

== Former players and athletes ==
RUA's former players include Albert Camus who played for the junior football team as goalkeeper.
