= List of MC Alger seasons =

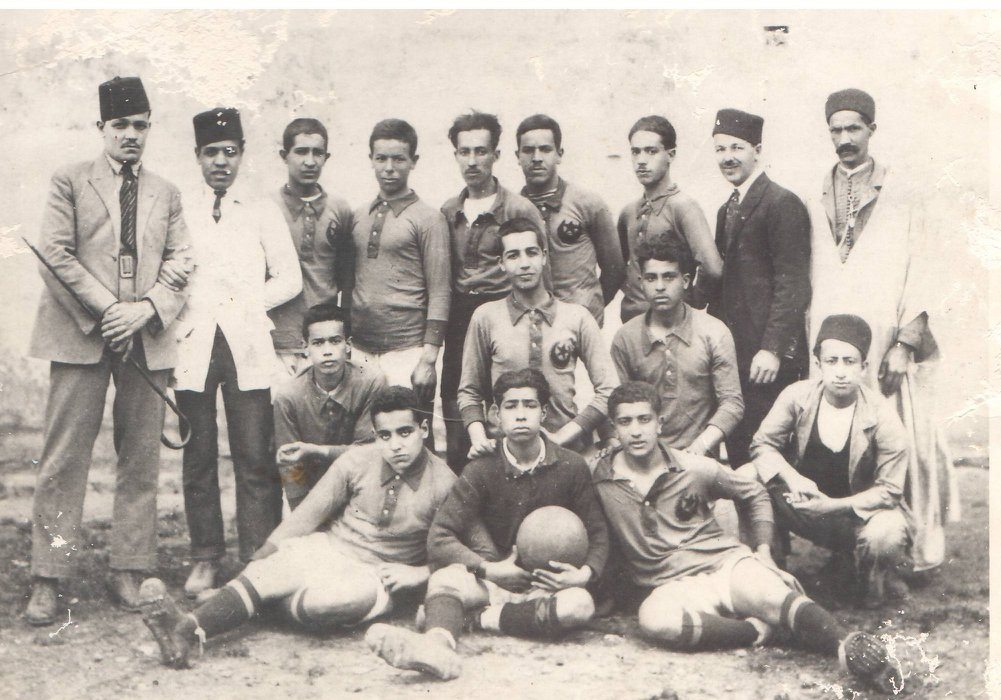
MC Alger's team during their first season 1921–22.

Mouloudia Club d'Alger is an Algerian professional football club based in Algiers, Algiers Province. The club was formed in Casbah in 1921 as Mouloudia Chaàbia d'Alger, and played their first competitive match in 1921, when they entered the 1921–22 Ligue d'Alger Troisième Division. This list details MC Alger's achievements in major competitions, together with the top scorers for each season.

The club has won a total of 20 major trophies, including the national championship 7 times also won the Algerian Cup a record 8 times, the Algerian Super Cup a record 3 times, the Algerian League Cup 1 times MC Alger won the CAF Champions League 1 times. The club has also never been out of the top two divisions of Algerian football since entering the Football League.

This is a list of the seasons played by MC Alger from 1962 when the club first entered a league competition to the most recent seasons. The club's achievements in all major national and international competitions as well as the top scorers are listed. Top scorers in bold were also top scorers of Ligue 1. The list is separated into three parts, coinciding with the three major episodes of Algerian football:

== Seasons ==
=== Before independence ===
Season	League Algiers									Forconi Cup	AFN		Top goalscorer(s)		Ref.
Season	Division	Pos	Pts	P	W	D	L	GF	GA	Forconi Cup	AFN		Name	Goals	Ref.
1921–22	5 Division	4th	21	10	4	3	3	12	13						
1922–23	4 Division	1st	24	10	6	2	2	14	6						
1923–24	Third Division	2nd	20	8	5	2	1	23	11						
1924–25	Third Division	2nd	21	8	6	1	1	10	8						
1927–28	5 Division	1st	20	8	5	2	1	15	5						
1928–29	4 Division	1st	39	17	14	2	1	41	9						
1929–30	Third Division	3rd	41	18	9	5	4	33	21						
1930–31	Third Division	1st	49	18	14	3	1	52	16						
1931–32	Second Division	9th	42	22	5	9	9	25	38						
1932–33	Second Division	8th	30	18	4	4	10	20	38	R1					
1933–34	Second Division	5th	34	18	6	4	8	35	37	QF					
1934–35	Second Division	2nd	44	18	12	2	4	37	16	SF					
1935–36	Second Division	1st	46	18	12	4	2	38	18		North African Championship	QF			
1936–37	Division Honneur	4th	42	18	9	6	3	28	16						
1937–38	Division Honneur	4th	34	18	5	6	7	23	27						
1938–39	Division Honneur	7th	40	22	8	2	12	31	37						
1939–40	Division Honneur	**1st**	38	14	10	2	2	47	11	SF					
1940–41	Division Honneur	2nd	36	16	8	4	4	30	21	QF					
1941–42	Division Honneur	5th	28	14	5	1	8	15	23						
1942–43	Division Honneur	5th	35	18	5	7	6	17	26						
1943–44	Division Honneur	2nd	42	18	10	4	4	30	18	Not played					
1944–45	Division Honneur	**1st**	46	18	13	2	3	41	21	R32					
1945–46	Division Honneur	2nd	49	22	9	9	4	28	17	SF					
1946–47	Division Honneur	3rd	52	22	12	6	4	31	24	QF					
1947–48	Division Honneur	2nd	52	22	10	10	2	32	17	**W**	North African Championship	R2	Omar Hahad	16	
1948–49	Division Honneur	3rd	48	22	9	8	5	34	24	R16			Hassen Bennour	11	
1949–50	Division Honneur	6th	44	22	6	10	6	23	23	QF	North African Championship	R1			
1950–51	Division Honneur	4th	49	22	10	7	5	31	22	**W**	North African Championship	R16			
1951–52	Division Honneur	2nd	50	22	9	10	3	34	30	RU	North African Cup	R2	Smaïl Khabatou, Omar Hahad	9	
1952–53	Division Honneur	2nd	46	22	7	10	5	26	22	R32					
1953–54	Division Honneur	2nd	52	22	11	8	3	34	23	R32					
1954–55	Division Honneur	2nd	53	22	13	5	4	33	15	QF	North African Cup	R16			
1955–56	Division Honneur	5th	32	15	6	5	4	26	17						

=== After independence ===
Below, the MC Alger season-by-season record after independence of Algeria :

Season	League									Cup	Other	Africa		Top goalscorer(s) (Note: Goals in all competitions (Algerian Ligue Professionnelle 1, Algerian Cup, League Cup, African and Super Cup) are counted.)		Ref.
Season	Division	Pos	Pts	P	W	D	L	GF	GA	Cup	Other	Africa		Name	Goals	
1962–63	Critérium Honneur	2nd	47	18	13	3	2	49	13	R32				Omar Hahad	15	
1963–64	Division Honneur	5th	57	30	16	9	7	54	30	SF				Zoubir Aouadj	24	
1964–65	National	14th	32	30	8	8	14	31	36	QF				Zoubir Aouadj	19	
1965–66	National 2	1st	68	30	20	8	2	63	18	QF				Abdelkrim Berkani	14	
1966–67	National II	7th	20	18	4	8	6	18	22	R16				Mourad Saâdi	6	
1967–68	National II	1st	45	22	14	3	5	41	14	R16				Aziz Oucif	15	
1968–69	National I	4th	46	22	11	2	9	28	24	QF				Hassen Tahir	12	
1969–70	National I	2nd	52	22	11	8	3	39	24	R32				Hassen Tahir	10	
1970–71	National I	3rd	46	22	7	10	5	28	22	**W**				Hassen Tahir	10	
1971–72	National I	**1st**	70	30	14	12	4	48	28	SF		Maghreb Cup Winners Cup	**W**	Hassen Tahir	24	
1972–73	National I	3rd	67	30	15	7	8	56	34	**W**		Maghreb Cup Winners Cup	3rd	Abdeslam Bousri	12	
1973–74	National I	5th	62	30	12	8	10	53	35	R32		Maghreb Cup Winners Cup	**W**	Omar Betrouni	17	
1974–75	National I	**1st**	72	30	16	10	4	49	22	QF		Maghreb Cup Winners Cup	SF	Ali Bencheikh	8	
1975–76	National I	**1st**	73	30	18	7	5	63	32	**W**		African Cup of Champions Clubs	**W** (Note: The competition ended in the following season)	Abdelkader Ait Hamouda	12	
1975–76	National I	**1st**	73	30	18	7	5	63	32	**W**		Maghreb Champions Cup	RU	Abdelkader Ait Hamouda	12	
1976–77	National I	5th	53	26	13	6	7	50	48	R16		African Cup of Champions Clubs	R2	Abdeslam Bousri	18	
1977–78	Division 1	**1st**	62	26	15	6	5	47	28	R16				**Abdeslam Bousri**	14	
1978–79	Division 1	**1st**	61	26	14	7	5	32	24	QF		African Cup of Champions Clubs	R2	**Abdeslam Bousri**	11	
1979–80	Division 1	8th	60	28	9	12	9	34	30	R32		African Cup of Champions Clubs	QF	**Nasser Bouiche**	19	
1980–81	Division 1	5th	58	28	13	4	11	47	42	R16				Nasser Bouiche	13	
1981–82	Division 1	10th	58	30	9	10	11	37	36	SF				**Abdeslam Bousri**	16	
1982–83	Division 1	4th	60	30	10	10	10	35	33	**W**				**Abdeslam Bousri**	19	
1983–84	Division 1	4th	63	30	11	11	8	36	30	QF		African Cup Winners' Cup	R2			
1984–85	Division 1	18th	73	38	9	17	12	40	39	QF						
1985–86	Division 2	1st	80	30	20	10	0	62	16	R16						
1986–87	Division 1	9th	39	38	13	13	12	42	37	R16				Mekhloufi, Sebbar	6	
1987–88	Division 1	13th	34	34	11	12	11	35	26	R32						
1988–89	Division 1	2nd	36	30	14	8	8	26	21	R32				khelifa Belaouchet	9	
1989–90	Division 1	3rd	34	30	11	12	7	27	20	NP				Khelifa Belhouchet	11	
1990–91	Division 1	5th	32	30	12	8	10	36	28	R32				Mourad Tebbal	7	
1991–92	Division 1	7th	32	30	12	8	10	30	34	R32	SF					
[1992–93	Division 1	7th	29	30	7	15	8	27	23	NP				Hedibel, Benmessahel	7	
1993–94	Division 1	7th	31	30	9	13	8	31	27	R16				Redouane Benmessahel	8	
1994–95	Division 1	5th	31	30	8	15	7	34	32	QF				Mourad Tebbal	11	
1995–96	Division 1	8th	40	30	12	4	14	29	32	R32	Grp			Mourad Aït Tahar	7	
1996–97	Division 1	6th	41	30	12	5	13	40	37	SF				Mourad Aït Tahar	11	
1997–98	Division 1	5th	16	14	3	7	4	8	11	R64	**W**			Ameur Benali	4	
1998–99	Super Division	**1st**	56	26	16	8	2	44	16	SF				Hamid Rahmouni	17	
1999–2000	Super Division	11th	22	22	4	10	8	18	25	R32	R16	CAF Champions League	R1	Fodil Dob	6	
2000–01	Super Division	14th	36	30	9	9	12	34	43	R16				Fodil Dob	8	
2001–02	Super Division	15th	34	30	7	13	10	27	33	QF				Fodil Dob	9	
2002–03	Division 2	**1st**	67	28	20	7	1	62	15	R64				Ameur Benali	10	
2003–04	Division 1	4th	47	30	14	5	11	35	34	R16				Karim Braham Chaouch	13	
2004–05	Division 1	3rd	49	30	14	7	9	39	44	QF		Arab Champions League	QF	Noureddine Daham	11	
2005–06	Division 1	6th	44	30	13	5	12	42	35	**W**		Arab Champions League	QF	Noureddine Daham	14	
2006–07	Division 1	11th	38	30	8	14	8	34	30	**W**	**W**	CAF Confederation Cup	R1	Hadj Bouguèche	10	
2006–07	Division 1	11th	38	30	8	14	8	34	30	**W**	**W**	Arab Champions League	R16	Hadj Bouguèche	10	
2007–08	Division 1	7th	39	30	9	12	9	26	25	R32	**W**	CAF Confederation Cup	R1	Younès, Belghomari	6	
2008–09	Division 1	5th	49	32	13	10	9	40	38	R32				Salim Boumechra	10	
2009–10	Division 1	**1st**	66	34	18	12	4	50	23	QF				**Hadj Bouguèche**	17	
2010–11	Ligue 1	10th	37	30	8	13	9	30	28	QF		Champions League	Grp	Abdelmalek Mokdad	12	
2011–12	Ligue 1	6th	44	30	11	11	8	35	33	R16				Moustapha Djallit	9	
2012–13	Ligue 1	5th	50	30	15	8	7	33	24	RU				**Moustapha Djallit**	18	
2013–14	Ligue 1	6th	45	30	13	6	11	26	25	**W**				Abderahmane Hachoud	11	
2014–15	Ligue 1	12th	39	30	10	9	11	33	31	R64		CAF Confederation Cup	PR	Kaled Gourmi	10	
2015–16	Ligue 1	12th	38	30	8	14	8	28	26	**W**				Abderahmane Hachoud	8	
2016–17	Ligue 1	2nd	50	30	14	8	8	38	27	SF	RU	CAF Confederation Cup	QF	Hichem Nekkache	10	
2017–18	Ligue 1	5th	44	30	12	8	10	41	32	SF		Champions League	Grp	Derrardja, Nekkache	14	
2018–19	Ligue 1	6th	43	30	11	10	9	35	36	R16		Arab Club Champions Cup	QF	Mohamed Souibaâh	8	
2019–20	Ligue 1 (Note: On March 15, 2020, the Ligue de Football Professionnel (LFP) decided to halt the season due to the COVID-19 pandemic in Algeria. On July 29, 2020, the LFP declared that season is over and CR Belouizdad to be the champion, the promotion of four teams from the League 2, and scrapping the relegation for the current season.)	2nd	34	20	10	4	6	28	25	R32		Arab Club Champions Cup	QF	Samy Frioui	12	
2020–21	Ligue 1	7th	57	38	15	12	11	59	43	NP	R16	CAF Champions League	QF	Samy Frioui	14	
2021–22	Ligue 1	8th	51	34	13	12	9	36	24	NP				Samy Frioui	17	
2022–23	Ligue 1	4th	47	30	12	11	7	21	20	R64				Kheireddine Merzougui	4	
2023–24	Ligue 1	**1st**	65	30	19	8	3	55	20	RU				**Youcef Belaïli**	16	
2024–25	Ligue 1	**1st**	58	30	15	13	2	39	19	R32	**W**	CAF Champions League	QF	Sofiane Bayazid	10	
2025–26	Ligue 1	**1st**	65	30	20	5	5	41	18	QF	**W**	CAF Champions League	Grp	Mohamed Saliou Bangoura	11	

== Key ==
Key to league record:

- P = Played
- W = Games won
- D = Games drawn
- L = Games lost
- GF = Goals for
- GA = Goals against
- Pts = Points
- Pos = Final position

Key to divisions:

- 1 = Ligue 1
- 2 = Ligue 2

Key to rounds:

- DNE = Did not enter
- Grp = Group stage
- R1 = First Round
- R2 = Second Round
- R32 = Round of 32
- R16 = Round of 16
- QF = Quarter-finals
- SF = Semi-finals
- RU = Runners-up
- W = Winners

Champions	Runners-up	Promoted	Relegated

Division shown in bold to indicate a change in division.
Top scorers shown in bold are players who were also top scorers in their division that season.

== Honours ==
As of the 2018–19 season, Mouloudia Club d'Alger have won a total of 20 titles (regional competitions not considered), of which 19 were achieved domestically and 1 in international competitions. The club's most recent honour is the 2015–16 Algerian Cup.

=== National ===
Competition	Titles	Winning years or seasons
Algerian Ligue Professionnelle 1	10	1971–72, 1974–75, 1975–76, 1977–78, 1978–79, 1998–99, 2009–10, 2023–24, 2024–25, 2025–26
Algerian Cup	8	1970–71, 1972–73, 1975–76, 1982–83, 2005–06, 2006–07, 2013–14, 2015–16
Algerian Super Cup	5	2006, 2007, 2014, 2024, 2025
Algerian League Cup	1	1998

=== African ===
Competition	Titles	Winning years or seasons
CAF Champions League	1	1976

=== Regional ===
Competition	Titles	Winning years or seasons
Maghreb Cup Winners Cup	2	1971, 1974

=== Doubles and trebles ===
- Trebles: (1975–76)
