= 1976–77 MC Alger season =

MC Alger
1976–77 season
- President: Abdelkader Drif
- Head coach: Hamid Zouba
- Stadium: Stade du 5 Juillet
- National 1: 5th
- Algerian Cup: Round of 16
- African Cup of Champions: 1976: Winners; 1977: Second round
- Top goalscorer: League: Abdeslam Bousri (17); All: Abdeslam Bousri (18)
Home colours

In the 1976–77 season, MC Alger is competing in the National 1 for the 12th season, as well as the Algerian Cup. It is their 9th consecutive season in the top flight of Algerian football. They will be competing in National, the Algerian Cup and the African Cup of Champions.

== Squad list ==
Players and squad numbers last updated on 18 November 1976.
Note: Flags indicate national team as has been defined under FIFA eligibility rules. Players may hold more than one non-FIFA nationality.

No.	Nat.	Position	Name	Date of Birth (Age)	Signed from
Goalkeepers
Defenders
Midfielders
Forwards

== Pre-season and friendlies ==
22 March 1977 Friendly	Real Madrid (Spain)	2–1	(Algeria) MC Alger	Madrid
20:45	Breitner 14'; Javier Aguilar 40'		Bachta 74'	Stadium: Santiago Bernabéu Stadium; Referee: Andaluz Sanchez Rio (Spain)
Note: Lineup for MC Alger - Ait Mouhoub Mohamed, Zemmour, Azzouz (Oudina 46'), Mahiouz, Zenir, Bachta, Betrouni, Bachi (cap), Bousri (Ait Hamouda 69'), Bencheikh, Draoui

24 March 1977 Friendly	MC Alger (Algeria)	1–1 (3–5 p)	Iran	Madrid
19:30	Zenir 60'		Kafur 54'	Stadium: Estadio Chamartín; Referee: Urrestarazu (Spain)
Note: Lineup for MC Alger - Ait Mouhoub Mohamed, Zemmour, Oudina, Mahiouz, Zenir, Bencheikh, Betrouni, Bachi (cap) (Draoui 46'), Bousri, Bachta, Ait Hamouda (Bellemou 78')

== Competitions ==
=== Overview ===
Competition	Record								Started round	Final position / round	First match	Last match
Competition	G	W	D	L	GF	GA	GD	Win %	Started round	Final position / round	First match	Last match
National 1	25	11	6	8	50	48	+2	44.00	—	5th	14 September 1976	1 July 1977
Algerian Cup	2	0	1	1	0	1	−1	0.00	Round of 32	Round of 16	14 January 1977	11 February 1977
1976 African Cup of Champions	6	4	0	2	13	8	+5	66.67	Quarter-Finals	Winners	10 September 1976	12 December 1976
1977 African Cup of Champions	2	1	1	0	4	3	+1	50.00	Second round		8 May 1977	22 May 1977
Total	35	16	8	11	67	60	+7	45.71				

=== Championnat National ===
==== League table ====
Pos	Team	Pld	W	D	L	GF	GA	GD	Pts	Qualification or relegation
3	NA Hussein Dey	26	16	5	5	60	26	+34	62 (Note: 1 point deducted?)	Algerian Cup Runner-up, qualified for Cup Winners' Cup
4	MC Oran	26	13	10	3	53	36	+17	62	
5	MC Alger	25	11	6	8	50	48	+2	52 (Note: 1 point deducted?)	
6	CA Batna	26	9	7	10	38	44	−6	51	
7	El Asnam SO	26	10	5	11	28	28	0	51	

Source: rsssf.com

==== Results by round ====
Round	1	2	3	4	5	6	7	8	9	10	11	12	13	14	15	16	17	18	19	20	21	22	23	24	25	26	27	28	29	30
Ground	H	A	H	A	H	A	H	H	H	A	H	A	H	A	H	A	H	A	H	A	H	A	A	A	H	A	H	A	H	A
Result																														
Position																														

Source: Competitive matches
A = Away; H = Home; W = Win; D = Draw; L = Loss

=== Matches ===
Win Draw Loss

14 September 1976 Round 1	MC Alger	4–0	El Asnam SO	Algiers
	Bousri 19', 48'; Draoui 21'; Azzouz 78' (pen.)			Stadium: Stade du 5 Juillet; Referee: Mohandi
Note: Lineup for MC Alger - .

22 November 1976 Round 2	RC Kouba	1–0	MC Alger	Algiers
	Ait Chegou Djillali 20'			Stadium: Stade du 5 Juillet; Referee: Benguergoura
Note: Lineup for MC Alger - Ait Mouhoub (Kaoua), Zemmour, Azzouz, Oudina, Zenir, Mahiouz, Betrouni (cap), Bachta, Bousri, Bencheikh, Ait Hamouda (Bellemou).

28 January 1977 Round 3	MC Alger	3–1	CA Batna	Algiers
	Nourine 22'; Bousri 28'; Ghozlane 67' (o.g.)		Smail 50'	Stadium: Stade du 5 Juillet; Referee: Mihoub, Bencheddad, Bendjahène
Note: Lineup for MC Alger - Ait Mouhoub, Bouzerde (Mechedal), Zemmour, Oudina, Mahiouz, Bencheikh, Betrouni (cap), Haddad, Bousri, Draoui, Nourine Réda.

1 October 1976 Round 4	CR Belcourt	4–0	MC Alger	Algiers
	Nefla 31'; Tlemçani 41', 75', 80'			Stadium: Stade du 5 Juillet; Referee: Mameri, Osmane, Saoudi
Note: Lineup for MC Alger - Ait Mouhoub (Kaoua), Zemmour, Azzouz, Mahiouz, Zenir, Bencheikh, Betrouni (cap), Bachta, Bousri, Draoui, Bellemou (Ait Hamouda 45').

15 October 1976 Round 5	MC Alger	4–2	RCG Oran	Algiers
	Zenir 18', 18'; Ait Hamouda 74', 89'		Itim 22'; Rouaz 88'	Stadium: Stade du 5 Juillet; Referee: Ghotari, Bendriss, Bendaoud
Note: Lineup for MC Alger - Ait Mouhoub, Zemmour, Azzouz, Mahiouz, Zenir, Bencheikh (Oudina), Betrouni (cap), Bachta, Bousri, Draoui (Ait Hamouda), Bellemou.

1 April 1977 Round 6	ES Guelma	2–4	MC Alger	Annaba
	Hamami 2'; Belaidi 46'		Ait Hamouda 35'; Bousri 54'; Bencheikh 78'; Betrouni 89'	Stadium: Colonel Chabou Abdelkader Stadium; Referee: Senoussi, Kaid, Tolo
Note: Lineup for MC Alger - Ait Mouhoub, Zemmour, Mechedal, Oudina, Bachta, Bencheikh, Betrouni, Bachi (cap) (Zenir), Bousri, Haddad, Ait Hamouda.

29 October 1976 Round 7	MC Alger	1–1	USM Alger	Algiers
	Ait Hamouda 75'		Guedioura 34'	Stadium: Stade du 5 Juillet; Referee: Garoui, Benguergoura, Bouaka
Note: Lineup for MC Alger - Ait Mouhoub (Kaoua), Zemmour, Mechedal, Mahiouz, Oudina, Labed (Zenir), Betrouni (cap), Bachta, Ait Hamouda, Achari.

3 January 1977 Round 8	MC Alger	1–4	JS Kawkabi	Algiers
	Bencheikh 59'		Baileche 24', 77', 85'; Baris 82'	Stadium: Stade du 5 Juillet; Referee: Bensaidi
Note: Lineup for MC Alger - Ait Mouhoub, Attar Braham, Azzouz, Oudina, Mahiouz, Haddad, Betrouni (cap), Bachta, Bousri, Bencheikh, Bellemou.

12 November 1976 Round 9	MC Alger	2–1	USM Maison Carrée	Algiers
	Bousri 56'; Bencheikh 72'		Selmi 46'	Stadium: Stade du 5 Juillet; Referee: Lakhal, Benganif, Mesli
Note: Lineup for MC Alger - Ait Mouhoub, Zemmour, Azzouz, Oudina, Zenir (cap), Mahiouz, Betrouni, Bachta, Bousri, Bencheikh, Bellemou (Ait Hamouda).

26 November 1976 Round 10	ES Sétif	2–2	MC Alger	Sétif
	Salhi Abdelhamid 31'; Salhi Layachi 55'		Bousri 51'; Zenir 89'	Stadium: Stade Mohamed Guessab; Referee: Bendjahène, Lacarne, Senouci
Note: Lineup for MC Alger - Kaoua, Zemmour, Azzouz, Oudina, Zenir, Bachta, Betrouni (cap), Mahiouz, Bousri, Ait Hamouda, Bellemou.

3 December 1976 Round 11	MC Alger	2–3	NA Hussein Dey	Algiers
	Zenir 45'; Bellemou 64'		Sahli 37', 57'; Ait El Hocine 76'	Stadium: Stade du 5 Juillet; Referee: Aouissi, Chibane, Osmane
Note: Lineup for MC Alger - Kaoua, Oudina, Azzouz, Mahiouz, Zenir, Bencheikh, Betrouni, Bachi (cap), Bousri (Ait Hamouda), Draoui, Attar Braham (Bellemou).

18 April 1977 Round 12	MC Oran	2–1	MC Alger	Oran
	Freha 32'; Kechra 43'		Bousri 63'	Stadium: Stade 19 juin 1965; Referee: Khelassi, Kezzoula, Lahmar
Note: Lineup for MC Alger - Kaoua (Ait Mouhoub 46'), Zemmour, Azzouz, Oudina, Zenir, Bachta, Ait Hamouda (Betrouni 46'), Bachi (cap), Bousri, Mahiouz, Bellemou (Bouzerde).

30 December 1976 Round 13	MC Alger	2–1	MO Constantine	Algiers
	Bousri 34'; Zemmour 58'		Krokro 24'	Stadium: Stade du 5 Juillet; Referee: Hansal
Note: Lineup for MC Alger - Ait Mouhoub, Zemmour (Attar Braham), Azzouz, Oudina, Mahiouz, Haddad, Betrouni, Bachi (cap), Bousri, Bencheikh, Bellemou.

7 January 1977 Round 14	El Asnam SO	0–1	MC Alger	Chlef
			Bousri 15'	Stadium: Stade Mâamar Sahli; Referee: Touil, Malek, Ould Kelai
Note: Lineup for MC Alger - Ait Mouhoub, Azzouz, Oudina,...Mahiouz, Betrouni, Bachi (c), Bousri.

21 January 1977 Round 15	MC Alger	1–1	RC Kouba	Algiers
	Bousri 4'		Bedjaoui 69'	Stadium: Stade du 5 Juillet; Referee: Bergui, Benaissa, Saoudi
Note: Lineup for MC Alger - Ait Mouhoub, Zemmour, Azzouz, Oudina, Zenir, Bencheikh, Betrouni, Bachi (cap), Bousri, Mahiouz, Ait Hamouda (Bachta).

14 April 1977 Round 16	CA Batna	2–1	MC Alger	Batna
	Gourdache ?'; Boutamine ?'		Bencheikh ?'	Stadium: Mustapha Seffouhi Stadium
Note: Lineup for MC Alger - Kaoua, Zemmour, Azzouz, Oudina, Bachta, Mahiouz, Betrouni (c), Haddad, Bencheikh, Bousri, Ait Hamouda.

4 April 1977 Round 17	MC Alger	1–2	CR Belcourt	Algiers
	Bousri 86'		Tlemçani 29', 79'	Stadium: Stade du 5 Juillet; Referee: Benganif, Bouaka, Bensaidi
Note: Lineup for MC Alger - Ait Mouhoub, Zemmour, Oudina, Mahiouz, Zenir, Haddad (Azzouz), Betrouni, Bachi (c), Bousri, Bachta, Bellemou.

17 June 1977 Round 18	RCG Oran	0–1	MC Alger	Oran
			Bousri 88'	Stadium: Stade 19 juin 1965
Note: Lineup for MC Alger - .

10 June 1977 Round 19	MC Alger	3–2	ES Guelma	Algiers
				Stadium: Stade du 5 Juillet
Note: Lineup for MC Alger - .

8 April 1977 Round 20	USM Alger	1–2	MC Alger	Algiers
	Ali Messaoud 71'		Zenir 17'; Bachi 82'	Stadium: Stade du 5 Juillet; Referee: Benguergoura, Touil, Saoudi
Note: Lineup for MC Alger - Kaoua, Zemmour, Oudina, Mahiouz, Zenir, Bencheikh (Haddad), Betrouni, Bachi (c), Bousri, Bachta, Ait Hamouda.

22 April 1977 Round 21	JS Kawkabi	3–3	MC Alger	Tizi Ouzou
	Baileche 48'; Dali 53'; Douadi 58'		Bellemou 25'; Bousri 47', 64'	Stadium: Stade Oukil Ramdane; Referee: Benganif, Bouaka, Amroune
Note: Lineup for MC Alger - Ait Mouhoub, Oudina, Azzouz, Mahiouz, Zenir, Bencheikh, Betrouni, Bachi (c), Bousri, Bachta, Bellemou.

29 April 1977 Round 22	USM Maison Carrée	3–2	MC Alger	Algiers
	Selmi 16', 65'		Mahiouz 25'; Bousri 44' (pen.); Zenir 72' (pen.)	Stadium: Stade du 5 Juillet; Referee: Aouissi, Chibane, Berkane
Note: Lineup for MC Alger - Kaoua, Zemmour, Azzouz, Oudina, Zenir, Mahiouz, Betrouni, Bachi (c), Bousri, Bachta (Bencheikh), Ait Hamouda (Bellemou).

13 May 1977 Round 23	MC Alger	2–2	ES Sétif	Algiers
	Ait Hamouda 17', 75'		Fellahi 15'; Griche 47'	Stadium: Stade du 5 Juillet; Referee: Mihoub, Sahli, Ouzane
Note: Lineup for MC Alger - Ait Mouhoub, Zemmour, Mechedal, Yousfi (Oudina), Azzouz, Mahiouz (Belkaid), Betrouni, Bachi (c), Ait Hamouda, Haddad, Bellemou.

27 May 1977 Round 24	NA Hussein Dey	6–3	MC Alger	Algiers
	Chenane 7'; Zarabi 53'; Benalouane 67'; Ighil 72'; Guenoun 80'; Guendouz 84'		Bellemou 4', 19', 89'	Stadium: Stade du 5 Juillet
Note: Lineup for MC Alger - Kaoua, Bouzerde (Saf), Oudina, Azzouz, Mahiouz, Haddad, Betrouni, Bachi (c), Bousri, Bencheikh (Zemmour), Bellemou.

3 June 1977 Round 25	MC Alger	3–3	MC Oran	Algiers
	Bousri 19', 22'; Betrouni 31'		Mehdi 56'; Benyoucef 75'; Chaib 86'	Stadium: Stade du 5 Juillet; Referee: Benghezal, Benseddik, Seddik Amerar
Note: Lineup for MC Alger - Ait Mouhoub, Zemmour, Mazid, Yousfi, Azzouz, Haddad, Betrouni Ramdane, Belkaid, Bousri (Labed), Betrouni Omar (c), Belaidi.

1 July 1977 Round 26	MO Constantine	0–3	MC Alger	Annaba
				Stadium: Colonel Chabou Abdelkader Stadium
Note: Lineup for MC Alger - .

=== Algerian Cup ===
14 January 1977 Round of 32	MC Alger	0–0 (a.e.t.)	RC Kouba	Algiers
				Stadium: Stade du 5 Juillet; Referee: Benganif
Note: Lineup for MC Alger - Ait Mouhoub, Zemmour, Oudina (Azzouz), Mahiouz, Zenir, Bencheikh, Betrouni, Bachi (cap), Bousri, Haddad (Junior), Bellemou (Bachta).

11 February 1977 Round of 16	USM Alger	1–0	MC Alger	Algiers
	Deraoui 93'			Stadium: Stade du 5 Juillet; Referee: Garoui
Note: Lineup for MC Alger - Ait Mouhoub, Zemmour, Azzouz, Oudina, Zenir, Bencheikh, Betrouni (cap), Mahiouz, Bousri, Ait Hamouda (Bachi), Draoui.

=== 1976 African Cup of Champions Clubs ===
==== Quarter-Finals ====
10 September 1976	MC Alger (Algeria)	6–3	(Kenya) Gor Mahia	Algiers
	Azzouz 13'; Bousri 18', 54'; Bencheikh 37', 58'; Bachta 30'		Ochieng Che 25'; Ayouma 79'; Aggounda 84'	Stadium: Stade du 5 Juillet; Referee: Fahmi (Egypt)
Note: Lineup for MC Alger - Kaoua, Zemmour, Azzouz, Mahiouz, Zenir, Bencheikh, Betrouni, Bachi, Bousri, Bachta, Bellemou (Draoui).

26 September 1976	Gor Mahia (Kenya)	0–1	(Algeria) MC Alger	Mombasa
			Bousri 32'	Stadium: ? Referee: ?
Note: Lineup for MC Alger - Ait Mouhoub, Zemmour, Azzouz, Mahiouz, Zenir, Bencheikh, Betrouni, Bachi (cap) (Ait Hamouda 16'), Bousri, Bachta, Draoui.

==== Semi-Finals ====
22 October 1976	Enugu Rangers (Nigeria)	2–0	(Algeria) MC Alger	Enugu
	Onjeka ?'; Anfayo ?'			Stadium: Nnamdi Azikiwe Stadium; Referee: ? (Senegal)
Note: Lineup for MC Alger - Kaoua, Zemmour, Bachta, Mahiouz (Azzouz), Zenir (Cap), Bencheikh, Betrouni, Bachi (Draoui), Bousri, Ait Hamouda, Bellemou.

6 November 1976	MC Alger (Algeria)	3–0	(Nigeria) Enugu Rangers	Algiers
	Bellemou 46'; Zenir 50'; Bousri 77'			Stadium: Stade du 5 Juillet; Referee: Diab Lattar (Egypt)
Note: Lineup for MC Alger - Ait Mouhoub, Zemmour, Azzouz, Oudina, Zenir (cap), Bencheikh, Betrouni, Bachta, Bousri, Draoui, Bellemou (Ait Hamouda).

==== Final ====
5 December 1976	Hafia FC (Guinea)	3–0	(Algeria) MC Alger	Conakry
	M. Sylla 24'; B. Sylla 37'; N’Jo Léa 65'			Stadium: Stade du 28 Septembre; Referee: M. Joyna (Gambia)
Note: Lineup for MC Alger - Kaoua (Ait Mouhoub 35'), Zemmour, Azzouz, Mahiouz, Zenir, Bencheikh, Betrouni, Bachi (cap), Bousri, Bachta, Bellemou.

12 December 1976	MC Alger (Algeria)	3–0 (3–1 p)	(Guinea) Hafia FC	Algiers
20:45 UTC+1	Bachi 24'; Betrouni 76', 90'			Stadium: Stade du 5 Juillet; Referee: Taoufik Ghazaya (Tunisia)
	Penalties
	Zenir (penalty scored); Bencheikh (penalty scored); Bachta (penalty scored)		(penalty missed) Bangoura; (penalty missed) Diarra; (penalty scored) M. Sylla; (penalty missed) Souleymane
Note: Lineup for MC Alger - Ait Mouhoub, Zemmour (Ait Hamouda), Azzouz, Mahiouz, Zenir, Bencheikh, Betrouni, Bachi (cap), Bousri, Bachta, Draoui.

=== 1977 African Cup of Champions Clubs ===
==== Second round ====
8 May 1977 First leg	Kampala City (Uganda)	1–1	(Algeria) MC Alger	Kampala
	Oudina 71' (o.g.)		Bachi 25'	Stadium: ? Referee: ? (Kenya)
Note: Lineup for MC Alger - Ait Mouhoub, Zemmour, Azzouz, Oudina, Zenir, Mahiouz (Haddad, junior), Betrouni, Bachi (cap), Bousri, Bachta, Draoui (Ait Hamouda).

22 May 1977 Second leg	MC Alger (Algeria)	3–2	(Uganda) Kampala City	Algiers
	Bousri 7'; Betrouni 14'; Bachta 82'		Dungu 54'; Kirunda 59'	Stadium: Stade du 5 Juillet; Referee: Gaâmar Saâdeddine (Libya)
Note: Lineup for MC Alger - Ait Mouhoub, Zemmour, Azzouz, Oudina, Zenir, Mahiouz (Bellemou), Betrouni, Bachi (cap), Bousri, Bachta, Draoui (Ait Hamouda).

== Squad information ==
=== Goalscorers ===
Includes all competitive matches. The list is sorted alphabetically by surname when total goals are equal.

Nat.	Player	Pos.	N 1	AC	CL 1	TOTAL
(Algeria)	Abdeslam Bousri	FW	17	0	5	22
(Algeria)	Abdelouahab Zenir	DF	6	0	1	7
(Algeria)	Abdelkader Ait Hamouda	FW	6	0	0	6
(Algeria)	Ali Bencheikh	MF	4	0	2	6
(Algeria)	Abdenour Bellemou	FW	5	0	1	6
(Algeria)	Omar Betrouni	FW	2	0	3	5
(Algeria)	Zoubir Bachi	MF	1	0	2	3
(Algeria)	Mohamed Azzouz	DF	1	0	1	2
(Algeria)	Anwar Bachta	MF	0	0	2	2
(Algeria)	Aissa Draoui	MF	1	0	0	1
(Algeria)	Nourine	?	1	0	0	1
(Algeria)	Abdenour Zemmour	DF	1	0	0	1
(Algeria)	Bouzid Mahiouz	DF	1	0	0	1
Own Goals			1	0	0	1
Totals			50	0	17	67
