= 1995–96 MC Alger season =

MC Alger
1995–96 season
- Head coach: Bencheikh Ali & Biskri Mustapha
- Stadium: Stade du 5 Juillet
- Division 1: 8th
- Algerian Cup: Round of 32
- League Cup: Group stage
- Top goalscorer: League: Mourad Aït Tahar (7); All: ()

In the 1995–96 season, MC Alger is competing in the National 1 for the 28th season, as well as the Algerian Cup. It is their 10th consecutive season in the top flight of Algerian football. They will be competing in National, and the Algerian Cup.

== Squad list ==
Players and squad numbers last updated on 18 November 1995.
Note: Flags indicate national team as has been defined under FIFA eligibility rules. Players may hold more than one non-FIFA nationality.

No.	Nat.	Position	Name	Date of Birth (Age)	Signed from
Goalkeepers
Defenders
Midfielders
Forwards

== Pre-season ==
15 July 1995 Friendly	Slovan Liberec (Czech Republic)	0–1	(Algeria) MC Alger
			Benali

July 1995 Friendly	AEK Larnaca (Cyprus)	2–1	(Algeria) MC Alger
			Aït Tahar

== Competitions ==
=== Overview ===
Competition	Record							
Competition	G	W	D	L	GF	GA	GD	Win %
Division 1	30	12	4	14	29	32	−3	40.00
Algerian Cup	2	1	0	1	2	2	+0	50.00
Algerian League Cup	6	1	4	1	5	2	+3	16.67
Total	38	14	8	16	36	36	+0	36.84

=== Division 1 ===
==== League table ====
Pos	Team	Pld	W	D	L	GF	GA	GD	Pts
6	CS Constantine	30	11	10	9	25	20	+5	43
7	USM El Harrach	30	12	7	11	24	26	−2	43
8	MC Alger	30	12	4	14	29	32	−3	40
9	US Chaouia	30	11	6	13	28	33	−5	39
10	CA Batna	30	12	3	15	35	44	−9	39

Rules for classification: 1) points; 2) goal difference; 3) number of goals scored.

==== Matches ====
Win Draw Loss

14 September 1995 Round 1	MC Alger	2–0	WA Boufarik	Algiers
	Bouderyassa 14', 70'	Report		Stadium: Stade du 5 Juillet; Referee: Zekrini, Mezouer, Roumani
Note: Lineup for MC Alger - Lezzoum, Harkat, Benaissi, Allouche, Khiat Sofiane, Sellou, Ait Tahar (Benali 75'), Benkedjoune, Boudersaia, Khiat Laid, Mechri (c) (Boussouar 79')

21 September 1995 Round 2	MC Oran	2–1	MC Alger	Oran
	Meçabih 41'; Zerrouki 64'	Report	Mecheri 72'	Stadium: Ahmed Zabana Stadium; Referee: Lamara
Note: Lineup for MC Alger - Lezzoum, Harkat, Benaissi, Allouche, Khiat Sofiane, Sellou (Khezrouni), Benali (Lemoui Kenzi 19'), Benkedjoune, Boudersaia, Khiat Laid, Mechri (c)

28 September 1995 Round 3	MC Alger	1–3	USM Aïn Beïda	Algiers
	Khiat laid 17'	Report	Touré Moussa 46'; Amiar 62' (pen.); Touré I. 86'	Stadium: Stade du 5 Juillet; Referee: Azem, Aouimer, Goumi
Note: Lineup for MC Alger - Lezzoum, Cherrouk, Zitouni, Allouche, Khiat Sofiane, Sellou (Benkedjoune 67'), Boudersaia (Nazef 74'), Khezrouni, Tebbal, Khiat Laid, Mechri

5 October 1995 Round 4	MC Alger	1–2	CR Belouizdad	Algiers
	Tebbal 50'	Report	Mounir Dob 65'; Ali Moussa 84'	Stadium: Stade du 5 Juillet; Referee: Nems, Bousnadji, Mazari
Note: Lineup for MC Alger - Lezzoum, Harkat, Zitouni (c), Lazizi, Ait Abderahmane, Sellou, Tebbal, Khezrouni (Benkedjoune 87'), Nazef, Khiat Laid (Boussouar 72'), Mechri

16 October 1995 Round 5	WA Tlemcen	1–0	MC Alger	Tlemcen
	Bettadj 53'	Report		Stadium: Stade Akid Lotfi; Referee: Belbordj, Chadli, Bourayou
Note: Lineup for MC Alger - Lezzoum, Harkat, Benaissi, Lazizi, Ait Abderahmane, Khezrouni, Ait Tahar, Nazef, Boussouar, Benali (Benkedjoune), Mecheri

8 April 1996 Round 6	MC Alger	3–0	JS Kabylie	Algiers
	Aït Tahar 3', 34'; Fodil Dob 46'			Stadium: Stade du 5 Juillet; Referee: Kouradji, Bourayou, Chadli
Note: Lineup for MC Alger - Lezzoum, Harkat, Benaissi, Lazizi (c), Nazef, Sellou, Ait Tahar (Benkedjoune 80'), Khezrouni, Dob Fodil, Benali, Mechri (Boussouar 83')

18 March 1996 Round 7	USM Alger	1–0	MC Alger	Bologhine
14:00	Zekri 1'	Report		Stadium: Omar Hamadi Stadium; Attendance: 0 (close doors); Referee: Belbordj, Hamida, Belatrèche
Note: Lineup for MC Alger - Lezzoum, Harkat, Zitouni, Lazizi (c), Ait Abderahmane, Allouche, Mechri, Benali, Nazef, Maza, Ait Tahar

15 April 1996 Round 8	MC Alger	1–1	CS Constantine	Algiers
	Khezrouni 53' (pen.)		Kaoua 30'	Stadium: Stade du 5 Juillet; Referee: Oukil Tahar, Tarchoune, Osmane
Note: Lineup for MC Alger - Lezzoum, Cherrouk, Benaissi, Allouche, Lazizi (c), Nazef, Ait Tahar, Khezrouni, Dob, Benali, Mechri

24 May 1996 Round 9	USM Blida	0–0	MC Alger	Blida
				Stadium: Brakni Brothers Stadium; Referee: Bendada, Atrous, Chadli
Note: Lineup for MC Alger - Alane, Cherrouk, Benaissi, Fatahine, Allouche, Sellou, Ait Tahar (c), Maza, Tebbal (Khiat Sofiane 75'), Benali (Zitouni 72'), Mechri

26 February 1996 Round 10	MC Alger	2–1	US Chaouia	Algiers
	Sellou 14'; Dob F 65'		Difallah 42'	Stadium: Stade du 5 Juillet
Note: Lineup for MC Alger - Bensalem, Harkat, Zitouni, Lazizi (c), Ait Abderrahmane, Sellou, Maza, Nazef, Dob Fodil, Benali, Ait Tahar

29 February 1996 Round 11	ASM Oran	4–0	MC Alger	Oran
	Amrane 28'; Benamara 47', 54'; Haddada 90'			Stadium: Habib Bouakeul Stadium; Referee: Oussaci, Mahmoud et Badache
Note: Lineup for MC Alger - Bensalem Fethi, Khiat Sofiane, Zitouni (c), Harkat, Ait Abderahmane, Sellou, Nazef, Maza, Dob Fodil (Boussouar 59'), Benali (Benkedjoune), Boudersaia

14 March 1996 Round 12	MC Alger	1–0	JS Bordj Ménaïel	Algiers
	Sellou 28' (pen.)			Stadium: Stade du 5 Juillet; Referee: Benchenâa, Bourayou, Chadli
Note: Lineup for MC Alger - Alane, Khiat Sofiane (Cherrouk 76'), Zitouni, Fatahine, Lazizi (c), Sellou, Boussouar (Benkedjoune 90'), Maza, Dob Fodil, Benali (Khezrouni 64'), Mechri

21 March 1996 Round 13	AS Aïn M'lila	1–0	MC Alger	Aïn M'lila
	Ababsa 30'			Stadium: Stade des Frères Demane Debih; Referee: Belbah, Khiar, Amrane
Note: Lineup for MC Alger - Alane, Khiat Sofiane, Zitouni, Fatahine, Lazizi (c), Allouche, Boussouar, Khezrouni (Ouahid), Boudersaia, Sellou (Chine), Mechri

28 March 1996 Round 14	MC Alger	1–0	CA Batna	Algiers
	Benali 63'			Stadium: Stade du 5 Juillet; Referee: Ouissi, Djezzar, Harrag
Note: Lineup for MC Alger - Alane, Khiat Sofiane, Cherrouk, Fatahine, Lazizi (c), Chine (Sellou), Boussouar (Allouche 73'), Maza, Dob Fodil, Benali (Benkedjoune 82'), Mechri

4 April 1996 Round 15	USM El Harrach	3–2	MC Alger	El Harrach
	Azizène 28', 45'; Azzouz 63'		Benkedjoune 35'; Ait Taher 90+1'	Stadium: Stade du 1er Novembre 1954; Referee: Lamara, Belaid, Idirène
Note: Lineup for MC Alger - Alane, Khiat Sofiane, Benaissi, Fatahine, Lazizi (c), Maza, Ait Tahar, Khezrouni, Bouamama (Dob Fodil), Benali, Benkedjoune (Mechri 74')

11 April 1996 Round 16	WA Boufarik	2–0	MC Alger	Boufarik
	Abane 30', 88'			Stadium: Stade Mohamed Reggaz; Referee: Boussis
Note: Lineup for MC Alger - Lezzoum, Harkat, Benaissi, Allouche, Lazizi (c), Khezrouni, Ait Tahar, Nazef (Mechri 49'), Dob Fodil (Benkedjoune 70'), Benali, Maza (Boussouar 68')

18 April 1996 Round 17	MC Alger	0–0	MC Oran	Algiers
				Stadium: Stade du 5 Juillet; Referee: Benyounès, Saker, Nakouri
Note: Lineup for MC Alger - Lezzoum, Allouche, Benaissi, Fatahine, Lazizi (c), Khezrouni, Ait Tahar, Maza, Nazef (Dob Fodil 59'), Benali (Boussouar 85'), Mechri

2 May 1996 Round 18	USM Aïn Beïda	2–0	MC Alger	Aïn Beïda
	Bouzghaia 55'; Boursas 90'			Stadium: Stade Hamdi Ali; Referee: Oussaci, Bouriche, Bâadache
Note: Lineup for MC Alger - Lezzoum, Cherrouk, Benaissi, Allouche, Lazizi (c), Sellou, Maza (Bouamama), Dob Fodhil, Benali, Boudersaia (Chine)

6 May 1996 Round 19	CR Belouizdad	0–3	MC Alger	Belouizdad
				Stadium: Stade 20 Août 1955; Referee: Azem, Bousnadji, El Djezzar
Note: CR Belouizdad did not show up refusing to play because of the presence of 3 of its players With Algeria national football team: Fayçal Badji, Slatni Mourad and Ahmed Chedba

16 May 1996 Round 20	MC Alger	0–1	WA Tlemcen	Algiers
			Bensaha 77'	Stadium: Stade du 5 Juillet; Referee: Kouradji, Latrèche, Aggoune
Note: Lineup for MC Alger - Lezzoum, Cherrouk (Benaissi 46'), Zitouni, Fatahine, Lazizi (cap), Maza (Sellou 66'), Ait Tahar (Dob Fodil 60), Khezrouni, Tebbal, Benali, Mechri

13 June 1996 Round 21	JS Kabylie	0–1	MC Alger	Tizi Ouzou
			Benali 67'	Stadium: Stade 1er Novembre 1954; Referee: Berber, Mazari, Hamouche
Note: Lineup for MC Alger - Lezzoum, Cherrouk, Benaissi, Fatahine, Allouche, Sellou, Ait Tahar, Khezrouni, Tebbal (Dob Fodil 79'), Benali, Mechri

20 June 1996 Round 22	MC Alger	1–0	USM Alger	Algiers
14:00	Aït Tahar 54'			Stadium: Stade du 5 Juillet; Referee: Bendada, Hafirassou, Belatrèche
Note: Lineup for MC Alger - Lezzoum, Khiat Sofiane (Zitouni 58'), Benaissi, Fatahine, Lazizi (c), Sellou, Ait Tahar, Khezrouni, Tebbal, Benali, Mechri

27 June 1996 Round 23	CS Constantine	1–0	MC Alger	Constantine
	Khellaf 9'			Stadium: Stade Mohamed Hamlaoui; Referee: Lezzoum, Hafirassou, Aissaoui
Note: Lineup for MC Alger - Lezzoum, Khiat Sofiane, Benaissi, Fatahine, Lazizi, Allouche, Tebbal (Bourahli), Khezrouni, Sellou (Dob), Benali (Benkedjoune), Mechri

8 July 1996 Round 24	MC Alger	1–0	USM Blida	Algiers
	Tebbal 19'			Stadium: Stade du 5 Juillet; Referee: Belbcir, Nakouri, Benziane
Note: Lineup for MC Alger - Lezzoum, Khiat Sofiane, Benaissi, Fatahine, Lazizi (c) (Allouche 66'), Sellou, Ait Tahar, Khezrouni, Tebbal, Benali (Boussouar 46'), Mechri (Benkedjoune 82')

11 July 1996 Round 25	US Chaouia	2–1	MC Alger	Oum El Bouaghi
	Soltani 3', 37'		Tebbal 10'	Stadium: Stade Hassouna Zerdani; Referee: Belbah, Châa, Benâakou
Note: Lineup for MC Alger - Lezzoum, Khiat Sofiane, Cherrouk, Allouche, Latrèche, Sellou, Ait Tahar (c) (Benkedjoune 73'), Khezrouni, Dob (Benazzouz 75'), Tebbal, Mechri

18 July 1996 Round 26	MC Alger	2–0	ASM Oran	Algiers
	Tebbal 2'; Dob Fodil 78'			Stadium: Stade du 5 Juillet; Referee: Oussaci, Belaid, Idirem
Note: Lineup for MC Alger - Alane, Khiat, Benaissi, Fatahine, Lazizi (c), Ait Tahar (Dob Fodil 75'), Khezrouni, Tebbal (Maza 32'), Benali (Allouche 70'), Mechri

25 July 1996 Round 27	JS Bordj Ménaïel	0–1	MC Alger	Bordj Ménaïel
			Khiat Sofiane 40'	Stadium: Stade Salah Takejerad; Referee: Benbetka, Boussendji, Mazari
Note: Lineup for MC Alger - Alane, Khiat Sofiane, Zitouni, Fatahine, Allouche, Sellou, Ait Tahar, Maza, Dob Fodil, Benali, Boudersaia

29 July 1996 Round 28	MC Alger	2–0	AS Aïn M'lila	Algiers
	Aït Tahar (?)			Stadium: Stade du 5 Juillet
Note: Lineup for MC Alger -

1 August 1996 Round 29	CA Batna	4–1	MC Alger	Batna
	Guechir 7'; Souilah 15', 22'; Bensaci 80'		Boussouar 67'	Stadium: Mustapha Seffouhi Stadium; Referee: Belbeh
Note: Lineup for MC Alger - Bensalem Fethi, Khiat Sofiane (Ouahid 63'), Benaissi (Benhamlat Hakim 37'), Allouche (Azzouz Said 46'), Latrèche Youcef, Chine Ryad, Benazzouz Moussa, Maza (c), Dob Fodil, Laleg, Boussouar

8 August 1996 Round 30	MC Alger	1–1	USM El Harrach	Algiers
	Ait Tahar 30'		Azizane 69'	Stadium: Stade du 5 Juillet; Referee: Bettache
Note: Lineup for MC Alger - Lezzoum, Benhamlat Hakim, Zitouni, Fatahine, Allouche, Sellou (Benazzouz Moussa 46'), Ait Tahar, Khezrouni, Maza, Mechri (Dob Fodil 83'), Benali (Laceb Brahim 83')

== Algerian Cup ==
7 March 1996 Round of 64	JB Aïn Kercha	1–2 (a.e.t.)	MC Alger	Aïn Kercha
14:00
Note: Lineup for MC Alger -

1 April 1996 Round of 32	JJ Azzaba	1–0	MC Alger	Azzaba
14:00				Stadium: Stade Boucetta Ali
Note: Lineup for MC Alger -

== Algerian League Cup ==
=== Group B ===
Team	Pld	W	D	L	GF	GA	GD	Pts
JS Bordj Ménaïel	6	3	1	2	4	5	−1	7
USM Blida	6	2	2	2	6	3	+3	6
MC Alger	6	1	4	1	5	2	+3	6
USM El Harrach	6	2	1	3	3	8	−5	5

30 November 1995 1	USM Blida	1–1	MC Alger	Blida
14:00	Amer Ouali 88'		Boussouar 6'	Stadium: Brakni Brothers Stadium; Referee: Bousnadji, Rekkad
Note: Lineup for MC Alger - Bensalem, Cherrouk, Zitouni, Khiat Sofiane, Ait Abderahmane, Sellou, Ait Tahar (c) (Nazef 60'), Khezrouni, Boussouar, Benali, Mechri (Dob Fodil 54')

7 December 1995 2	USM El Harrach	0–0	MC Alger	El Harrach
14:00				Stadium: Stade du 1er Novembre 1954
Note: Lineup for MC Alger - Bensalem, Cherrouk, Zitouni, Allouche, Ait Abderahmane, Sellou (c), Mechri, Khezrouni, Tebbal, Benali, Ait Tahar

14 December 1995 3	JS Bordj Ménaïel	0–0	MC Alger
14:00
Note: Lineup for MC Alger -

21 December 1995 4	MC Alger	0–0	USM Blida	Algiers
14:00				Stadium: Stade du 5 Juillet; Referee: Achir, Zelioui, Seghir
Note: Lineup for MC Alger - Bensalem, Cherrouk, Zitouni, Harkat, Ait Abderahmane, Sellou (Tebbal 60'), Mechri (Dob Fodil 76'), Khezrouni, Benali, Nazef, Boussouar

29 December 1995 5	MC Alger	4–0	USM El Harrach	Algiers
14:00				Stadium: Stade du 5 Juillet
Note: Lineup for MC Alger -

4 January 1996 6	MC Alger	0–1	JS Bordj Ménaïel	Algiers
14:00			Termoul 40'	Stadium: Stade du 5 Juillet
Note: Lineup for MC Alger -

== Squad information ==
=== Appearances and goals ===
No.	Pos	Nat	Player	Total		Ligue 1		Algerian Cup		League Cup	
No.	Pos	Nat	Player	Apps	Goals	Apps	Goals	Apps	Goals	Apps	Goals
Goalkeepers
	GK	(Algeria) ALG	Lezzoum Ali	0	0	0	0	0	0	0	0
	GK	(Algeria) ALG	Alane Abderahmane	0	0	0	0	0	0	0	0
	GK	(Algeria) ALG	Bensalem Fethi	0	0	0	0	0	0	0	0
Defenders
	DF	(Algeria) ALG	Cherrouk Merouane	0	0	0	0	0	0	0	0
	DF	(Algeria) ALG	Harkat Abdelkader	0	0	0	0	0	0	0	0
	DF	(Algeria) ALG	Benaïssi Kamel	0	0	0	0	0	0	0	0
	DF	(Algeria) ALG	Allouche Fayçal	0	0	0	0	0	0	0	0
	DF	(Algeria) ALG	Lazizi Tarek	0	0	0	0	0	0	0	0
	DF	(Algeria) ALG	Fatahine Lyès	0	0	0	0	0	0	0	0
	DF	(Algeria) ALG	Khiat Sofiane	0	0	0	0	0	0	0	0
Midfielders
	MF	(Algeria) ALG	Nazef Lahcène	0	0	0	0	0	0	0	0
	MF	(Algeria) ALG	Khezrouni Mohamed	0	0	0	0	0	0	0	0
	MF	(Algeria) ALG	Benali Ameur	0	0	0	0	0	0	0	0
	MF	(Algeria) ALG	Sellou Nadir	0	0	0	0	0	0	0	0
Forwards
	FW	(Algeria) ALG	Mechri Bachir	0	0	0	0	0	0	0	0
	FW	(Algeria) ALG	Ait Tahar Mourad	0	0	0	0	0	0	0	0
	FW	(Algeria) ALG	Dob Fodil	0	0	0	0	0	0	0	0
	FW	(Algeria) ALG	Benkedjoune Fethi	0	0	0	0	0	0	0	0
	FW	(Algeria) ALG	Boussouar Rafik	0	0	0	0	0	0	0	0
	FW	(Algeria) ALG	Tebbal Mourad	0	0	0	0	0	0	0	0
	FW	(Algeria) ALG	Zitouni Abderahmane	0	0	0	0	0	0	0	0
	FW	(Algeria) ALG	Boudersaia Younès	0	0	0	0	0	0	0	0
Players transferred out during the season
	DF	(Algeria) ALG	Ait Abederrahmane Messaoud	0	0	0	0	0	0	0	0
	MF	(Algeria) ALG	Khiat Laid	0	0	0	0	0	0	0	0
	MF	(Algeria) ALG	Lemoui Kanzi	0	0	0	0	0	0	0	0

Source: Competitions

=== Goalscorers ===
Includes all competitive matches. The list is sorted alphabetically by surname when total goals are equal.

No.	Nat.	Player	Pos.	National 1	Cup	League Cup	TOTAL
	(Algeria)			0	0	0	0
	(Algeria)			0	0	0	0
	(Algeria)			0	0	0	0
	(Algeria)			0	0	0	0
	(Algeria)			0	0	0	0
	(Algeria)			0	0	0	0
Own Goals				0	0	0	0
Totals				0	0	0	0

== Transfers ==
=== In ===
Date	Pos	Player	From club	Transfer fee	Source
1995	MF	(Algeria) Benali Ameur	ASO Chlef	Free transfer	
1995	MF	(Algeria) Khiat Laid	US Chaouia	Free transfer	
1995	GK	(Algeria) Alane Abderahmane	JS Kabylie	Free transfer	
1995	GK	(Algeria) Bensalem Fethi	WB Ain Benian	Free transfer	
1995	DF	(Algeria) Ait Abederrahmane Messaoud	JS Kabylie	Free transfer	
1995	DF	(Algeria) Benaïssi Kamel	Hydra AC	Free transfer	
1995	FW	(Algeria) Boudersaia Younès	Hydra AC	Free transfer	
