= 1948–49 MC Alger season =

MC Alger
1948–49 season
- Head coach: Smaïl Khabatou
- Stadium: Stade de Saint-Eugène
- Division Honneur: 3rd
- Forconi Cup: Round of 16
- Top goalscorer: League: Hassen Bennour (9); All: Hassen Bennour (11)
Home colours

In the 1948–49 season, MC Alger competed in the Division Honneur for the 13th season French colonial era, as well as the Forconi Cup. They competed in Division Honneur, and the North African Cup.

== Friendly ==
29 August 1948 Coupe le Royal	MC Alger	4–2	GS Alger	Saint Eugène
	Bouhired (?); Khabatou (?); Guitoun (?)		Deléo (?); Fortuné (?)	Stadium: Stade Communal Saint Eugène

4 September 1948 Coupe le Royal	MC Alger	1–1	O Hussein Dey	Saint Eugène
	Guitoun 36'		Fez 72'	Stadium: Stade Communal Saint Eugène; Referee: Boroni

11 September 1948 Coupe le Royal	MC Alger	2–3	RC Maison Carrée	Saint Eugène
	Hahad (?); Kouar Sid Ahmed (?)		Ségui (?); Kreugel (?)	Stadium: Stade Communal Saint Eugène
Note: Lineup for MC Alger - Bachet, Khabatou, Bouhired Mustapha, Benhamou Hamid, Kouar Sid Ahmed, Kouar Omar, Bouzagou, Ait Saâda Mohamed, Hahad, Azef (Deguigui), Guitoun.

1 May 1949 Friendly	MC Alger	0–0	(Socialist Federal Republic of Yugoslavia) Lokomotiva Zagreb	Saint Eugène
		Report		Stadium: Stade Communal Saint Eugène
Note: Lineup for MC Alger - Abtouche, Hamoutène, Tadjet, Bouachoun, Abdelaoui, Benhamou Hamid, Ait Saâda (Kouar Sid Ahmed), Belhadj, Bennour, Hahad, Khelil.

5 June 1949 Friendly	MC Alger	2–6	(France) FC Sète	Saint Eugène
	Ait Saâda 40' (?)		Nagy 20' (?); Bucchi 41'; Koranyi (?); Bouchouk (?)	Stadium: Stade Communal Saint Eugène
Note: Lineup for MC Alger - Yousfi, Hamoutène, Abdelaoui, Bouaichoun, Khabatou, Benhamou Hamid, Ait Saâda, Belhadj, Hahad, Bennour, Kouar Sid Ahmed.

== Competitions ==
=== Overview ===
Competition	Record								Started round	Final position / round	First match	Last match
Competition	G	W	D	L	GF	GA	GD	Win %	Started round	Final position / round	First match	Last match
Division Honneur	22	9	8	5	34	24	+10	40.91	—N/a	3rd	26 September 1948	24 April 1949
Forconi Cup	2	1	0	1	6	2	+4	50.00	Round of 32	Round of 16	17 October 1948	7 November 1948
Total	24	10	8	6	40	26	+14	41.67				

=== Division Honneur ===
==== League table ====
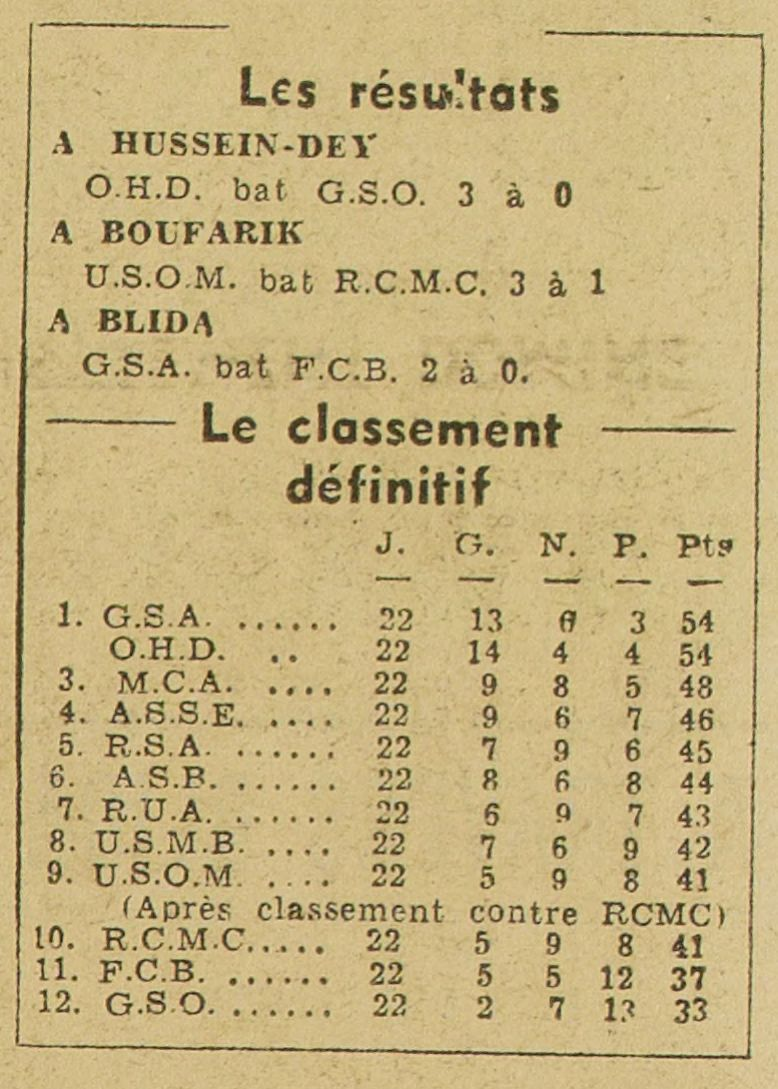
1948–49 League Algiers Standings

Pos	Team	Pld	W	D	L	F	A	GD	Pts	Notes
1	GS Alger	22	13	6	3	0	0	0	54	
2	O Hussein Dey	22	14	4	4	0	0	0	54	
3	MC Alger	22	9	8	5	34	24	+10	48	
4	AS Saint Eugène	22	9	6	7	0	0	0	46	
5	RS Alger	22	7	9	6	0	0	0	45	
6	AS Boufarik	22	8	6	8	0	0	0	44	
7	RU Alger	22	6	9	7	0	0	0	43	
8	USM Blida	22	7	6	9	36	33	+2	42	
9	US Ouest Mitdja	22	5	9	8	0	0	0	41	
10	RC Maison Carrée	22	5	9	8	0	0	0	41	
11	FC Blida	22	5	5	12	0	0	0	37	
12	GS Orléansville	22	2	7	13	0	0	0	33	

==== Results by round ====
Round	1	2	3	4	5	6	7	8	9	10	11	12	13	14	15	16	17	18	19	20	21	22
Ground	A	H	A	H	A	H	H	A	H	A	H	H	A	H	A	H	A	A	H	A	H	A
Result	D	D	D	W	D	W	D	L	W	W	D	W	W	L	W	L	D	W	L	D	W	L
Position																						3

Source: Competitive matches
A = Away; H = Home; W = Win; D = Draw; L = Loss

=== Matches ===
Win Draw Loss

26 September 1948 Round 1	O Hussein Dey	1–1	MC Alger	Hussein Dey
	Gomez (?)	Report	Ait Saâda (?)
Note: Lineup for MC Alger - Abtouche, Bouhired Mustapha, Khabatou, Tadjet, Abdelaoui, Benhamou Hamid, Ait Saâda Mohamed, Guitoun, Hahad, Kouar Sid Ahmed, Deguigui.

3 October 1948 Round 2	MC Alger	2–2	AS Saint Eugène	Saint Eugène
	Hahad 14'; Ait Sâada 56'	Report		Stadium: Stade Communal Saint Eugène
Note: Lineup for MC Alger - Bachet, Bouhired, Tadjet, Khabatou, Abdelaoui, Benhamou Hamid, Ait Saâda, Bennour, Hahad, Kouar Sid Ahmed, Deguigui.

10 October 1948 Round 3	FC Blida	2–2	MC Alger	Blida
	Ruiz (?); Antoine (?)	Report	Ait Sâada 63'; Bouhired 71'	Referee: Pellegrineschi
Note: Lineup for MC Alger - Bachet, Hamoutène, Khabatou, Abdelaoui, Tadjet, Benhamou Hamid, Deguigui, Kouar Sid Ahmed, Bouhired, Hahad, Ait Saâda.

24 October 1948 Round 4	MC Alger	5–1	GS Orléansville	Saint Eugène
	Bennour 1', 8', 65'; Ait Saâda 29'; Hahad 89'	Report	Larbi 44'	Stadium: Stade Communal Saint Eugène
Note: Lineup for MC Alger - Bachet, Bouhired Mustapha, Hamoutène, Hanoun, Benhamou Hamid, Abdelaoui, Ait Saâda Mohamed, Khabatou, Bennour, Kouar Sid Ahmed, Hahad.

11 November 1948 Round 5	RS Alger	0–0	MC Alger	Algiers
		Report		Stadium: Stade municipal
Note: Lineup for MC Alger - Abtouche, Hamoutène, Khabatou, Abdelaoui, Hanoun, Benhamou Hamid, Guitoun, Bouhired Mustapha, Kouar Sid Ahmed, Azef.

14 November 1948 Round 6	MC Alger	2–0	GS Alger	Saint Eugène
	Hahad (?)	Report		Stadium: Stade Communal Saint Eugène; Referee: Boccechiampe
Note: Lineup for MC Alger - Abtouche, Hamoutène, Benhamou Hamid, Abdelaoui, Bennour, Khabatou, Hahad, Kouar Sid Ahmed, Bouhired Mustapha, Hanoun, Azef.

21 November 1948 Round 7	MC Alger	0–0	USM Blida	Saint Eugène
		Report		Stadium: Stade Communal Saint Eugène; Referee: Graziani
Note: Lineup for MC Alger - Abtouche, Hamoutène, Tadjet, Khabatou, Abdelaoui, Benhamou Hamid, Ait Saâda Mohamed, Bennour, Hahad, Kouar Sid Ahmed, Azef.

28 November 1948 Round 8	AS Boufarik	2–1	MC Alger	Boufarik
	Defrance (?), 88'	Report	Hahad 60'	Referee: Toodori
Note: Lineup for MC Alger - Abtouche, Khabatou, Bouhired Mustapha, Benhamou Hamid, Abdelaoui, Tadjet, Hahad, Kouar Sid Ahmed, Derriche Merzak, Bennour, Azef.

12 December 1948 Round 9	MC Alger	2–1	RU Alger	Saint Eugène
	Bennour 21', 71'	Report	Trapp 66'	Stadium: Stade Communal Saint Eugène; Referee: Pelligrineschi
Note: Lineup for MC Alger - Abtouche, Khabatou, Hamoutène, Bouhired Mustapha, Abdelaoui, Tadjet, Deguigi, Kouar Sid Ahmed, Bennour, Hahad, Azef.

19 December 1948 Round 10	RC Maison Carrée	0–2	MC Alger	Maison Carrée
		Report	Khabatou 5'; Ait Saâda 43'	Stadium: Stade Maison Carrée; Referee: Leyguevaques
Note: Lineup for MC Alger - Abtouche, Aziz, Hamoutène, Tadjet, Bouzagou, Benhamou Hamid, Hahad, Ait Saâda Mohamed, Bouhired Mustapha, Kouar Sid Ahmed, Khabatou.

9 January 1949 Round 11	MC Alger	0–0	US Ouest Mitdja	Saint Eugène
		Report		Stadium: Stade Communal Saint Eugène; Referee: Todori
Note: Lineup for MC Alger - Abtouche, Hamoutène, Khabatou, Abdelaoui, Tadjet, Bouhired Mustapha, Ait Saâda Mohamed, Benhamou Hamid, Bennour, Hahad, Kouar Sid Ahmed.

16 January 1949 Round 12	MC Alger	3–1	O Hussein Dey	Saint Eugène
	Deguigui 4', 77'; Bouhired 90'	Report	Sintès 36'	Stadium: Stade Communal Saint Eugène; Referee: Riveiccio
Note: Lineup for MC Alger - Abtouche, Hamoutène, Tadjet, Khabatou, Benhamou Hamid, Bennour, Abdelaoui, Hahad, Kouar Sid Ahmed, Bouhired Mustapha, Deguigui.

23 January 1949 Round 13	AS Saint Eugène	0–1	MC Alger	Saint Eugène
		Report	Abdelaoui 79'	Stadium: Stade Communal Saint Eugène; Referee: Attanasio
Note: Lineup for MC Alger - Abtouche, Hamoutène, Tadjet, Khabatou, Hanoun, Benhamou Hamid, Deguigui, Abdelaoui, Bouhired Mustapha, Kouar Sid Ahmed, Hahad.

30 January 1949 Round 14	MC Alger	0–2	FC Blida	Saint Eugène
		Report	Abtouche (?); Camand (?)	Stadium: Stade Communal Saint Eugène; Referee: Pélegrineschi
Note: Lineup for MC Alger - Abtouche, Hamoutène, Tadjet, Khabatou, Hanoun, Benhamou Hamid, Bennour, Bouhired Mustapha, Abdelaoui, Kouar Sid Ahmed, Khelil.

20 February 1949 Round 15	GS Orléansville	0–2	MC Alger	Orléansville
		Report	Bennour 47', 60'	Referee: Gorofalo
Note: Lineup for MC Alger - Abtouche, Hamoutène, Khabatou, Ader, Bouhired Mustapha, Bennour, Benhamou Hamid, Bouzagou, Deguigui, Hahad.

27 February 1949 Round 16	MC Alger	0–1	RS Alger	Saint Eugène
		Report	Buffard (?)	Stadium: Stade Communal Saint Eugène; Referee: Graziani
Note: Lineup for MC Alger - Abtouche, Hamoutène, Khabatou, Tadjet, Abdelaoui, Benhamou Hamid, Deguigui, Hahad, Bouhired Mustapha, Kouar Sid Ahmed, Azef.

13 March 1949 Round 17	GS Alger	2–2	MC Alger	Algiers
	Déléo (?); Hamoutène (?)	Report	Bennour 2'; Tadjet 84'	Stadium: Stade municipal Referee: Boccheciampo
Note: Lineup for MC Alger - Abtouche, Hamoutène, Bouhired Mustapha, Abdelaoui, Benhamou Hamid, Tadjet, Deguigui, Khabatou, Bennour, Kouar Sid Ahmed, Hahad.

20 March 1949 Round 18	USM Blida	0–1	MC Alger	Blida
		Report	Hahad 31'	Referee: Garofalo
Note: Lineup for MC Alger -

27 March 1949 Round 19	MC Alger	1–2	AS Boufarik	Saint Eugène
	Hahad 68'	Report	Pérez 13'; Robert (?)	Stadium: Stade Communal Saint Eugène; Referee: Rivieccio
Note: Lineup for MC Alger - Belahcène, Hamoutène, Khabatou, Abdelaoui, Tadjet, Benhamou Hamid, Ait Saâda, Bennour, Derriche Merzak, Kouar Sid Ahmed, Hahad.

10 April 1949 Round 20	RU Alger	3–3	MC Alger	Algiers
	Vivès (?); Lorenzo (?); Jasseron (?)	Report	Tadjet 20', 60', 65'	Stadium: Stade municipal Referee: Pellegrineschi
Note: Lineup for MC Alger - Abtouche, Hamoutène, Abdelaoui, Khabatou, Kouar Omar dit Kouar II, Benhamou Hamid, Ait Saâda, Bennour, Tadjet, Kouar Sid Ahmed, Hahad.

17 April 1949 Round 21	MC Alger	4–2	RC Maison Carrée	Saint Eugène
	Ait Sâada 46'; Tadjet 49'; Khabatou 74'; Bennour 77'	Report	Ségui 42'; Marcellin 51'	Stadium: Stade Communal Saint Eugène; Referee: Amar
Note: Lineup for MC Alger - Abtouche, Khabatou, Kouar Sid Ahmed, Kouar Omar, Abdelaoui, Benhamou Hamid, Ait Saâda, Hanoun, Tadjet, Bennour, Hahad.

24 April 1949 Round 22	US Ouest Mitdja	2–0	MC Alger	El Affroun
	Kouar Omar (?); Botaro (?)	Report		Referee: Baroni
Note: Lineup for MC Alger - Abtouche, Hamoutène, Kouar Omar, Abdelaoui, Hanoun, Bouzagou, Ait Saâda, Bennour, Tadjet, Hahad, Kouar Sid Ahmed.

== Forconi Cup ==
17 October 1948 4th Round	MC Alger	6–0	WR Belcourt	Saint Eugène
	Ait Sâada 34', 89'; Kouar Sid Ahmed 60' (pen.); Bennour 68', 86'; Azef 83'	Report		Stadium: Stade Communal Saint Eugène
Note: Lineup for MC Alger -

7 November 1948 5th Round	GS Alger	2–0	MC Alger	Hussein Dey
	Deléo (?)	Report		Referee: Riveccio
Note: Lineup for MC Alger - Abtouche, Hamoutène, Bennour, Bouhired Mustapha, Abdelaoui, Behamou Hamid, Ait Saâda, Khabatou, Hahad, Kouar Sid Ahmed, Deguigui.

== Squad information ==
=== Playing statistics ===
All except round 18 and 4th Round Cup.

No.	Pos	Nat	Player	Total		Division Honneur		Forconi Cup	
No.	Pos	Nat	Player	Apps	Goals	Apps	Goals	Apps	Goals
Goalkeepers
	GK	(Algeria) ALG	Abtouche Mansour "Ali"	19	0	17	0	2	0
	GK	(Algeria) ALG	Bachet Benaissa	3	0	3	0	0	0
	GK	(Algeria) ALG	Belahcène M'hamed	1	0	1	0	0	0
	GK	(Algeria) ALG	Yousfi Ali	0	0	0	0	0	0
	DF	(Algeria) ALG	Smaïl Khabatou	22	2	20	2	2	0
		(Algeria) ALG	Kouar Sid Ahmed	22	1	20	0	2	1
	FW	(Algeria) ALG	Omar Hahad	20	7	19	7	1	0
		(Algeria) ALG	Abdelkader Bouzera as Abdelaoui	20	1	19	1	1	0
	MF	(Algeria) ALG	Benhamou Hamid dit Hamid	20	0	19	0	1	0
		(Algeria) ALG	Mohamed Tadjet	17	5	17	5	0	0
	DF	(Algeria) ALG	Hassen Hamoutène	18	0	17	0	1	0
		(Algeria) ALG	Mustapha Bouhired	17	2	16	2	1	0
		(Algeria) ALG	Hassen Bennour	17	11	15	9	2	2
		(Algeria) ALG	Mohamed Ait Saâda	13	8	11	6	2	2
		(Algeria) ALG	Abderahmane Deguigui	9	2	8	2	1	0
		(Algeria) ALG	Hanoun Larbi	7	0	7	0	0	0
	FW	(Algeria) ALG	Azef Aziouez	7	1	6	0	1	1
		(Algeria) ALG	Kouar Omar	3	0	3	0	0	0
		(Algeria) ALG	Bouzagou Abdelkader	3	0	3	0	0	0
		(Algeria) ALG	Guitoun Mohamed "Amar"	2	0	2	0	0	0
		(Algeria) ALG	Derriche Merzak	2	0	2	0	0	0
		(Algeria) ALG	Benna Mohamed	0	0	0	0	0	0
		(Algeria) ALG	Oualiken Mohamed "Mohand"	0	0	0	0	0	0
		(Algeria) ALG	Derriche Ilyès	0	0	0	0	0	0
		(Algeria) ALG	Bouaichoun Mustapha	0	0	0	0	0	0

=== Goalscorers ===
Includes all competitive matches. The list is sorted alphabetically by surname when total goals are equal.

Nat.	Player	Pos.	DH	FC	TOTAL
(Algeria)	Hassen Bennour		9	2	11
(Algeria)	Mohamed Ait Saâda		6	2	8
(Algeria)	Omar Hahad	FW	7	0	7
(Algeria)	Mohamed Tadjet		5	0	5
(Algeria)	Abderahmane Deguigui		2	0	2
(Algeria)	Smaïl Khabatou	DF	2	0	2
(Algeria)	Mustapha Bouhired		2	0	2
(Algeria)	Abdelkader Bouzera as Abdelaoui		1	0	1
(Algeria)	Kouar Sid Ahmed		0	1	1
(Algeria)	Azef Aziouez		0	1	1
Own Goals			0	0	0
Totals			34	6	40
