= 1997–98 MC Alger season =

MC Alger
1997–98 season
- President: Mohamed Djouad
- Head coach: Abdelwahab Zenir (until January 1998); Ali Bencheikh & Mohamed Henkouche (from January 1998) (until April 1998); Abdelwahab Zenir (from April 1998)
- Stadium: Stade du 5 Juillet
- Division 1: 5th
- Algerian Cup: Round of 64
- League Cup: Winners
- Top goalscorer: League: Benali, Gacemi (2 goals); All: Ameur Benali (4 goals)

In the 1997–98 season, MC Alger competed in the Division 1 for the 30th time They competed in Ligue 1, the Algerian Cup, and the Algerian League Cup.

== Squad list ==
Players and squad numbers last updated on 18 November 1998.
Note: Flags indicate national team as has been defined under FIFA eligibility rules. Players may hold more than one non-FIFA nationality.

No.	Nat.	Name	Position	Date of Birth (Age)	Signed from
Goalkeepers
	(Algeria)	Omar Hamenad	GK	7 February 1969 (aged 28)	(Algeria) JS Kabylie
	(Algeria)	Ali Lezzoum	GK	9 January 1971 (aged 26)	(Algeria)
	(Algeria)	Fethi Bensalem	GK		(Algeria)
Defenders
	(Algeria)	Yacine Slatni		3 November 1973 (aged 23)	(Algeria) USM Annaba
	(Algeria)	Mohamed Mekhazni		12 February 1978 (aged 19)	(Algeria) JS Kabylie
	(Algeria)	Mohamed Belgherbi			(Algeria) ASO Chlef
	(Algeria)	Abdelhamid Nechad			(Algeria) ASM Oran
	(Algeria)	Rafik Khennouf			(Algeria) US Biskra
	(Algeria)	Hakim Benhamlat		12 May 1977 (aged 20)	(Algeria)
	(Algeria)	Sofiane Khiat			(Algeria)
	(Algeria)	Said Azzouz			(Algeria)
	(Algeria)	Fayçal Allouche			(Algeria)
	(Algeria)	Lyès Fatahine			(Algeria)
	(Algeria)	Abderrahmane Zitouni			(Algeria)
	(Algeria)	Ramzi Bendaoud			(Algeria)
Midfielders
	(Algeria)	Abdellatif Derriche			(Algeria) USM El Harrach
	(Algeria)	Brahim Ouahid		19 August 1977 (aged 20)	(Algeria)
	(Algeria)	Moussa Benazzouz			(Algeria)
	(Algeria)	Mohamed Maâchou			(Algeria) RC Kouba
	(Algeria)	Fethi Benkedjoune			(Algeria)
	(Algeria)	Ameur Benali		28 February 1970 (aged 27)	(Algeria) ASO Chlef
	(Algeria)	Abdelkrim Doudène		25 October 1972 (aged 24)	(Algeria) JS Kabylie
	(Algeria)	Nadir Sellou			(Algeria)
	(Algeria)	Amar Ammour		10 September 1976 (aged 21)	(Algeria) MCB Aïn Hedjel
	(Algeria)	Brahim Maghrici			(Algeria) JS Kabylie
Forwards
	(Algeria)	Bachir Mecheri		5 July 1967 (aged 30)	(Algeria) MC Oran
	(Algeria)	Fodil Dob		22 October 1975 (aged 21)	(Algeria) Reserve team
	(Algeria)	Rafik Saifi		7 February 1975 (aged 22)	(Algeria) IB Khémis El Khechna
	(Algeria)	Hocine Gacemi		26 March 1973 (aged 24)	(Algeria) CRB Mécheria
	(Algeria)	Tayeb Houti			(Algeria) CR Belouizdad
	(Algeria)	Affif Goual			(Algeria) MO Constantine

== Competitions ==
=== Overview ===
Competition	Record								Started round	Final position / round	First match	Last match
Competition	G	W	D	L	GF	GA	GD	Win %	Started round	Final position / round	First match	Last match
Division 1	14	3	7	4	8	11	−3	21.43	—	5th	1 January 1998	11 June 1998
Algerian Cup	1	0	1	0	0	0	+0	0.00	Round of 64		16 March 1998	
League Cup	6	6	0	0	8	1	+7	100.00	Round of 64	Winner	2 October 1997	1 November 1997
Total	21	9	8	4	16	12	+4	42.86				

=== Division 1 ===
==== League table ====
Pos	Team	Pld	W	D	L	GF	GA	GD	Pts	Qualification
1	USM Alger (Q)	14	6	7	1	16	10	+6	25	Qualified for the championship final
2	JS Kabylie	14	6	4	4	14	11	+3	22	
3	ES Mostaganem	14	6	3	5	20	16	+4	21	
4	ES Sétif	14	4	6	4	15	15	0	18	
5	MC Alger	14	3	7	4	8	11	−3	16	
6	AS Aïn M'lila	14	2	9	3	8	11	−3	15	
7	WA Boufarik	14	1	9	4	11	12	−1	12	
8	USM Blida	14	1	9	4	9	13	−4	12	

Source: rsssf
Rules for classification: 1) points; 2) goal difference; 3) number of goals scored.
(Q) Qualified for the phase indicated

==== Results summary ====
Overall								Home						Away					
Pld	W	D	L	GF	GA	GD	Pts	W	D	L	GF	GA	GD	W	D	L	GF	GA	GD
14	3	7	4	8	11	−3	16	2	4	1	4	2	+2	1	3	3	4	9	−5

Last updated: 14 March 2020.
Source: Competitive matches

==== Results by round ====
Round	1	2	3	4	5	6	7	8	9	10	11	12	13	14
Ground	A	H	A	H	A	H	A	H	A	H	A	H	A	H
Result	D	D	L	W	D	D	W	L	L	D	L	W	D	D
Position														

Source: Competitive matches
A = Away; H = Home; W = Win; D = Draw; L = Loss

=== Matches ===
Win Draw Loss

1 January 1998 Round 1	USM Alger	0–0	MC Alger	Algiers
13:30		Report		Stadium: Stade du 5 Juillet; Referee: Zekrini, Mazari, Athamna
Note: Lineup for MC Alger - Hamened, Slatni Yacine, Khenouf, Allouche, Fatahine (Belgherbi 77e), Derriche, Saifi, Doudène, Dob Fodil, Benali (Sellou 85e), Mechri (c). - Coach Abdelouahab Zenir

8 January 1998 Round 2	MC Alger	1–1	JS Kabylie	Algiers
14:30	Fodil Dob 25'	Report	Aït Tahar 41'	Stadium: Stade du 5 Juillet; Referee: Berber, Roumani, Abbès
Note: Lineup for MC Alger - Hamenad, Slatni, Khennouf, Neched, Belgherbi, Derriche, Saifi, Doudène, Fodil Dob, Benali (Benkadjoun 68), Mécheri. - Coach Zenir Abdelouaheb

15 January 1998 Round 3	ES Sétif	2–1	MC Alger	Sétif
:	Derbal 46'; Rahmouni 85'	Report	Mecheri 45'	Stadium: 8 May 1945 Stadium; Referee: Karim Dahou, Harraz, Bettahar
Note: Lineup for MC Alger - Hamened, Allouche, Khenouf (Zitouni 70'), Nechad, Belgherbi, Derriche, Slatni Yacine, Doudène (Saifi 76'), Dob Fodil, Sellou, Mechri (c). - Coach Zenir Abdelouahab

22 January 1998 Round 4	MC Alger	1–0	ES Mostaganem	Algiers
:	Sellou Nadhir 15' (pen.)	Report		Stadium: Stade du 5 Juillet; Referee: Hirèche, Hamlaoui, Guettaf
Note: Lineup for MC Alger - Hamened, Allouche (Benali 57'), Zitouni (Khennouf 89'), Nechad, Blegherbi, Derriche, Slatni Yacine, Sellou, Dob Fodil (Saifi 72'), Doudène, Mechri (c). - Coach Zenir Abdelouahab

27 February 1998 Round 5	USM Blida	1–1	MC Alger	Blida
14:30	Belatrèche or Benamor 65'	Report	Benali 34'	Stadium: Brakni Brothers Stadium; Referee: Oussaci, H'Mida, Miloudi
Note: Lineup for MC Alger - Lezzoum, Doudène, Slatni Yacine, Nechad, Allouche, Sellou, Benkedjoune (Fatahine 89'), Derriche (Khiat Sofiane 60'), Dob Fodil, Benali, Mâachou (Gasmi 55'). - Coach Henkouche Mohamed & Bencheikh Ali

6 March 1998 Round 6	MC Alger	0–0	AS Aïn M'lila	Algiers
14:30		Report		Stadium: Stade du 5 Juillet; Referee: Touati Djaballah, Bettahar, Charef
Note: Lineup for MC Alger - Hamened, Khiat Sofiane, Slatni Yacine, Nechad, Belgherbi, Derriche, Mâachou (Gasmi 59'), Sellou (Ammour 23'), Benkedjoun, Benali, Mechri (cap) (Houti 57'). - Coach Henkouche Mohamed & Bencheikh Ali

30 March 1998 Round 7	WA Boufarik	0–1	MC Alger	Boufarik
14:00		Report	Benali 52'	Stadium: Stade Mohamed Reggaz; Referee: El-Azzoun, Baidar, Zerguine
Note: Lineup for MC Alger - Hamened (c), Khiat Sofiane, Slatni Yacine, Nechad, Belgherbi, Derriche, Sellou, Benkedjoun, Benali, Ammour (Houti 57'), Mâachou. - Coach Henkouche Mohamed & Bencheikh Ali

17 April 1998 Round 8	MC Alger	0–1	USM Alger	Algiers
14:00		Report	Mehdaoui 31' (pen.)	Stadium: Stade du 5 Juillet; Attendance: 65,000; Referee: Djamel Eddine Benchenâa, Chadli, Bourayou
Note: Lineup for MC Alger - Hamened (c), Slatni Yacine, Zitouni, Nechad, Allouche, Derriche (Mâachou 73e), Goual (Benkedjoune 62e), Saifi, Dob Fodil, Benali, Mechri. - Coach Henkouche Mohamed & Bencheikh Ali

24 April 1998 Round 9	JS Kabylie	3–0	MC Alger	Tizi Ouzou
:	Aït Tahar 12', 40'; Meghraoui 87'	Report		Stadium: November 1, 1954 Stadium
Note: Lineup for MC Alger - Hamened (cap), Allouche, Slatni Yacine, Nechad, Belgherbi, Derriche, Goual, Doudène, Dob Fodil, Benali (Sellou 40 puis Saifi 63'), Mechri (Mâachou 63'). - Coach Henkouche Mohamed & Lafri Fouzi

7 May 1998 Round 10	MC Alger	0–0	ES Sétif	Algiers
:		Report		Stadium: Stade du 5 Juillet; Referee: Djamel Haimoudi, Terchoune, Kerrai
Note: Lineup for MC Alger - Hamened (c), Slatni Yacine, Zitouni, Nechad, Fatahine, Derriche, Goual, Doudène (Saifi 72'), Dob Fodil (Gasmi 60'), Benali, Mechri. - Coach Henkouche Mohamed & Zenir Abdelouahab

14 May 1998 Round 11	ES Mostaganem	3–1	MC Alger	Mostaganem
:	Nechad 5' (o.g.); Blehocine 50'; Merakchi 58'	Report	Goual 15'	Stadium: Stade Mohamed Bensaïd; Referee: Oussaci, H'mida, Athamnia
Note: Lineup for MC Alger - Hamened (cap), Slatni Yacine, Khennouf, Nechad, Fatahine, Derriche, Goual, Sellou, Saifi, Benali, Benkedjoun (Mâachou 60'). - Coach Henkouche Mohamed & Zenir Abdelouahab

21 May 1998 Round 12	MC Alger	2–0	USM Blida	Algiers
:	Hocine Gasmi 49', 77'	Report		Stadium: Stade du 5 Juillet; Referee: Mourad Bendada, Belbordj, Dani
Note: Lineup for MC Alger - Lezzoum, Slatni Yacine, Khiat Sofiane (Khennouf 46', Belgherbi 56'), Nechad, Derriche, Goual, Doudène, Saifi, Gasmi, Benali (Sellou 74'), Mechri (c). - Coach Henkouche Mohamed & Zenir Abdelouahab

28 May 1998 Round 13	AS Aïn M'lila	0–0	MC Alger	Aïn M'lila
:		Report		Stadium: Stade des Frères Demane-Debbih; Referee: Lezzoum, Benkhaledi, Tayeb
Note: Lineup for MC Alger - Lezzoum, Slatni Yacine, Zitouni, Nechad, Belgherbi, Derriche, Saifi, Sellou, Gasmi (Benali 46'), Doudène, Mechri (c). - Coach Henkouche Mohamed & Zenir Abdelouahab

11 June 1998 Round 14	MC Alger	0–0	WA Boufarik	Algiers
:		Report		Stadium: Stade du 5 Juillet; Referee: Benaissa, Saker, Belebcir
Note: Lineup for MC Alger - Lezzoum, Slatni Yacine, Derriche, Allouche Fayçal, Belgherbi, Sellou, Goual (Benali 55'), Doudène, Gasmi (Mâachou 75'), Saifi, Mechri (c). - Coach Henkouche Mohamed & Zenir Abdelouahab

=== Algerian Cup ===
16 March 1998 Round of 64	USM Khenchela	0–0 (4–3 p)	MC Alger	Khenchela
14:00		Report		Stadium: Amar Hamam Stadium; Referee: Oussaci, Aribi, Demane
Note: Lineup for MC Alger - Hamened (c), Slatni Yacine, Zitouni, Nechad, Belgherbi, Derriche, Benkedjoune, Doudène, Dob Fodil, Benali, Mechri. - Coach Henkouche Mohamed & Bencheikh Ali

=== League Cup ===
2 October 1997 Round of 64	MC Alger	2–0	MC El Eulma	Algiers
:	Houhou 32'; Benkedjoune 82'	Report		Stadium: Stade 5 Juillet 1962
Note: Lineup for MC Alger - Lezzoum, Mekhazni, Benhamlat Hakim, Nechad, Fatahine, Derriche (Ouahid 79'), Saifi, Doudène (Benazzouz 75'), Houhou, Benali (Benkedjoun 75'), Mechri (c). - Coach Zenir Abdelouahab

6 October 1997 Round of 32	MC Alger	1–0	JS Bordj Ménaïel	Algiers
:		Report		Stadium: Stade 5 Juillet 1962
Note: Lineup for MC Alger - - Coach

9 October 1997 Round of 16	USM El Harrach	1–2	MC Alger	El Harrach
:	Boukelal 90+1'	Report	Houhou 6'; Benali 40'	Stadium: Stade du 1er Novembre 1954; Referee: Ouznadji, Bendjaballah, Bentahar
Note: Lineup for MC Alger - Hamened, Mekhazni, Khennouf, Nechad, Fatahine, Derriche, Saifi (Benkedjoune 83'), Doudène, Houhou, Benali (Benazzouz 62'), Mechri (c) (Azzouz Said 87'). - Coach Zenir Abdelouahab

16 October 1997 Quarter-finals	CR Belouizdad	0–1	MC Alger	Algiers
:		Report	Benali 45'	Stadium: Stade 5 Juillet 1962; Referee: Oussaci, Hmida, Nakouri
Note: Lineup for MC Alger - Hamened, Mekhazni, Khennouf, Nechad, Fatahine Lyès, Derriche (Azzouz 82'), Saifi (Gasmi 77'), Doudène, Houhou, Benali, Mechri (c) (Benazzouz 75'). - Coach Zenir Abdelouahab

27 October 1997 Semi-finals	MC Alger	1–0	ASM Oran	Algiers
:	Mecheri 2'	Report		Stadium: Stade 5 Juillet 1962; Attendance: 20,000; Referee: Bendada, Belbordj, Dani
Note: Lineup for MC Alger - Hamened, Mekhazni, Khennouf, Nechad, Fatahine, Derriche, Saifi, Doudène, Houhou (Maâchou 60'), Mechri (c) (Benkedjoune 62'), Benali. - Coach Zenir Abdelouahab

1 November 1997 Final	MC Alger	1–0	CA Batna	Algiers
:	Rafik Saïfi 8'	Report		Stadium: Stade 5 Juillet 1962; Attendance: 70,000; Referee: Dahou, Belbeh, Kherrez
Note: Lineup for MC Alger - Hamened, Khiat Sofiane, Khennouf, Nechad, Fatahine, Derriche, Mechri (cap), Saifi, Houhou, Benali (Benkedjoune), Doudène (Dob Fodil). - Coach Abdelwahab Zenir

== Squad information ==
=== Appearances and goals ===
No.	Pos	Nat	Player	Total		Division 1		Algerian Cup		League Cup	
No.	Pos	Nat	Player	Apps	Goals	Apps	Goals	Apps	Goals	Apps	Goals
	GK	(Algeria) ALG	Omar Hamenad	15	0	10	0	1	0	4	0
	GK	(Algeria) ALG	Ali Lezzoum	5	0	4	0	0	0	1	0
	GK	(Algeria) ALG	Fethi Bensalem	0	0	0	0	0	0	0	0
	DF	(Algeria) ALG	Yacine Slatni	15	0	14	0	1	0	0	0
	DF	(Algeria) ALG	Mohamed Mekhazni	4	0	0	0	0	0	4	0
	DF	(Algeria) ALG	Mohamed Belgherbi	11	0	10	0	1	0	0	0
	DF	(Algeria) ALG	Abdelhamid Nechad	18	0	12	0	1	0	5	0
	DF	(Algeria) ALG	Rafik Khennouf	10	0	6	0	0	0	4	0
	DF	(Algeria) ALG	Hakim Benhamlat	1	0	0	0	0	0	1	0
	DF	(Algeria) ALG	Sofiane Khiat	5	0	4	0	0	0	1	0
	DF	(Algeria) ALG	Said Azzouz	2	0	0	0	0	0	2	0
	DF	(Algeria) ALG	Fayçal Allouche	7	0	7	0	0	0	0	0
	DF	(Algeria) ALG	Lyès Fatahine	9	0	4	0	0	0	5	0
	DF	(Algeria) ALG	Abderrahmane Zitouni	6	0	5	0	1	0	0	0
	DF	(Algeria) ALG	Ramzi Bendaoud	0	0	0	0	0	0	0	0
	MF	(Algeria) ALG	Abdellatif Derriche	20	0	14	0	1	0	5	0
	MF	(Algeria) ALG	Brahim Ouahid	1	0	0	0	0	0	1	0
	MF	(Algeria) ALG	Moussa Benazzouz	3	0	0	0	0	0	3	0
	MF	(Algeria) ALG	Mohamed Maâchou	8	0	7	0	0	0	1	0
	MF	(Algeria) ALG	Fethi Benkedjoune	11	1	6	0	1	0	4	1
	MF	(Algeria) ALG	Ameur Benali	19	4	13	2	1	0	5	2
	MF	(Algeria) ALG	Karim Doudéne	16	0	10	0	1	0	5	0
	MF	(Algeria) ALG	Nadir Sellou	11	1	11	1	0	0	0	0
	MF	(Algeria) ALG	Amar Ammour	2	0	2	0	0	0	0	0
	MF	(Algeria) ALG	Brahim Maghrici	0	0	0	0	0	0	0	0
	FW	(Algeria) ALG	Bachir Mecheri	17	2	11	1	1	0	5	1
	FW	(Algeria) ALG	Samir Houhou	5	2	0	0	0	0	5	2
	FW	(Algeria) ALG	Fodil Dob	10	1	8	1	1	0	1	0
	FW	(Algeria) ALG	Rafik Saifi	16	1	11	0	0	0	5	1
	FW	(Algeria) ALG	Hocine Gacemi	7	2	6	2	0	0	1	0
	FW	(Algeria) ALG	Tayeb Houti	2	0	2	0	0	0	0	0
	FW	(Algeria) ALG	Affif Goual	6	1	6	1	0	0	0	0

Last updated: 10 May 2001
Source: Competitions

=== Goalscorers ===
Includes all competitive matches. The list is sorted alphabetically by surname when total goals are equal.

No.	Nat.	Player	Pos.	D 1	AC	LC	TOTAL
	(Algeria)	Ameur Benali	MF	2	0	2	4
	(Algeria)	Bachir Mecheri	FW	1	0	1	2
	(Algeria)	Samir Houhou	FW	0	0	2	2
	(Algeria)	Hocine Gacemi	FW	2	0	0	2
	(Algeria)	Fethi Benkedjoune	MF	0	0	1	1
	(Algeria)	Nadir Sellou	MF	1	0	0	1
	(Algeria)	Fodil Dob	FW	1	0	0	1
	(Algeria)	Rafik Saifi	FW	0	0	1	1
	(Algeria)	Affif Goual	FW	1	0	0	1
Own Goals				0	0	0	0
Totals				8	0	8	16
