= 1962–63 MC Alger season =

MC Alger
1962–63 season
- Chairman: Abdellah Benahbylès
- Head coach: Saïd Haddad
- Stadium: Stade de Saint-Eugène
- Criterions of Honour: Runners-up
- Algerian Cup: Round of 32
- Top goalscorer: League: Omar Hahad (15); All: Omar Hahad (15)
Home colours	Away colours

In the 1962–63 season, MC Alger is competing in the Criteria of Honour for the 1st season, as well as the Algerian Cup. They will be competing in National, and the Algerian Cup.

== Squad list ==
Players and squad numbers last updated on 18 November 1976.
Note: Flags indicate national team as has been defined under FIFA eligibility rules. Players may hold more than one non-FIFA nationality.

== Pre-season and friendlies ==
29 September 1962 El Anasser Tournoi	OM Ruisseau	7–1	MC Alger	Hamma Annassers
				Stadium: Stade municipal
Note: Lineup for MC Alger - Ben Berkane, Berrekia, Issiakhem, Djamal, Maârouf, Aboudil, Lyassine, Azza, Hahad, Boumaiza, Azzef.

30 September 1962 El Anasser Tournoi	MC Alger	1–0	JS Kabylie	Hamma Annassers
	Meziani ?'			Stadium: Stade municipal Referee: Chibane
Note: Lineup for MC Alger - Benberkane, Maârouf, Berrekia, Djamel, Belksir, Zouaoui, Hadjou, Benali, Lyès, Aouar, Benhamou Hamid, Lyassine, Meziani Abderahmane, Azzef, Seddiki Ali.

October 1962 Friendly	NA Hussein Dey	3–2	MC Alger
Note: Lineup for MC Alger - Boubekeur, Benhamou, Berrekia, Azzouz, Boualem, Maârouf, Haffar, Boumaiza (Mouloud), Azza, Azef.

21 October 1962 Friendly	MC Alger	4–1	CC Alger
	Azza 48', 52'; Laâgoun 70', 72'		Tazairt 26'	Referee: Chala, Mecebbeb, Harachi
Note: Lineup for MC Alger - Benberkane, Benhamou Hamid, Maârouf, Atbi, Senane, Azzouz, Dahmoun Abdeldjalil, Laâgoun, Hahad (Azza), Zidane, Azzef.

30 December 1962 Friendly	AS Orléansville	2–1	MC Alger	Orléansville
	Belaid 46'; Fedlaoui 81'		Rezzoug 25'	Referee: Dubourg, Merzoug, Bensaidi
Note: Lineup for MC Alger -

9 February 1963 Friendly	MC Alger	4–2	WA Boufarik	Saint-Eugène
	Hahad 27'; Azza 55', 75'; Azzouz 70'		Reguig 48' (pen.); Rezzik II 65'	Stadium: Stade de Saint-Eugène
Note: Lineup for MC Alger - Boubekeur, Maârouf, Atbi, Sahnine, Senane, Dahmoune, Zidane, Azza, Hahad (cap), Oualiken, Rezzoug.

17 March 1963 Coupe Air France	JS El Biar	2–1	MC Alger	El Biar
	Hamiani 18'; Bendamardji 43'		Lyassine 14'	Referee: Addou
Note: Lineup for MC Alger -

== Competitions ==
=== Overview ===
Competition	Record								Started round	Final position / round	First match	Last match
Competition	G	W	D	L	GF	GA	GD	Win %	Started round	Final position / round	First match	Last match
Criteria of Honour	18	13	3	2	49	13	+36	72.22	—	1st	7 October 1962	7 April 1963
Algerian Cup	2	1	0	1	5	4	+1	50.00	Round of 64	Round of 32	4 November 1962	25 November 1962
Total	0	0	0	0	0	0	+0	—				

=== Results by round ===
Round	1	2	3	4	5	6	7	8	9	10	11	12	13	14	15	16	17	18
Ground	H	A	H	A	H	A	A	H	A	A	H	A	H	A	H	H	A	H
Result	L	W	D	D	L	W	D	W	W	W	W	W	W	W	W	W	W	W
Position																		

Source: Competitive matches
A = Away; H = Home; W = Win; D = Draw; L = Loss

=== Matches ===
Win Draw Loss

7 October 1962 Round 1	MC Alger	0–2	RS Alger	Saint-Eugène
		Report	Malek 15'; Rezig 37'	Stadium: Stade de Saint-Eugène; Referee: Chibane, Bouamama, Kara
Note: Lineup for MC Alger - Benberkane, Berrekia, Maârouf, Aboudil, Benhamou Hamid, Lyassine, Haffar, Hahad, Azza, Hadjou, issiakhem.

14 October 1962 Round 2	JSI Issers	1–10	MC Alger	Issers
	Bouhanik ?'	Report	Azzef 13', 28', 79'; Hahad 7', 49'; Lyassine 33'; Benhamou 44'; Senane 57'; Azzouz 65'; Kouar 87'	Referee: Loubari, Rahmouni
Note: Lineup for MC Alger - .

28 October 1962 Round 3	MC Alger	1–1	AS Dellys	Saint-Eugène
	Azza 27'	Report	Zerrar 11'	Stadium: Stade de Saint-Eugène; Referee: Di Méglio, Miloud, Juan
Note: Lineup for MC Alger - Benberkane, Maârouf, Atbi, Benhamou Hamid, Azzouz, Senane, Lyassine, Laâgoun, Azza, Zidane, Dahmoune Abdeldjalil.

11 November 1962 Round 4	JS Bordj Ménaïel	1–1	MC Alger	Bordj Menaïel
	Ramdani Brahim 25'	Report	Laâgoun 85'	Stadium: Stade Salah Takjrad; Referee: Khelifi
Note: Lineup for MC Alger - Belahcène, Maârouf, Berrekia, Atbi, Dahmoun Abdeldjalil, Naâmane, Haffar, Laâgoun, Hahad, Zidane, Azzef.

18 November 1962 Round 5	MC Alger	1–3	USM Maison Carrée	Saint-Eugène
	Laâgoun 70'	Report	Aouar 30', 83'; Nazef 56'	Stadium: Stade de Saint-Eugène; Referee: Chekaimi, Bencherif, Chala
Note: Lineup for MC Alger - Belahcène, Maârouf, Berrekia, Atbi, Dahmoun, Naâmane, Lyassine, Laâgoun, Azzef, Azzouz, Zidane.

2 December 1962 Round 6	ESM Alger	1–2	MC Alger	Bab El Oued
	Nefir 83'	Report	Hahad 41'; Atbi 46'	Stadium: Stade Marcel Cerdan; Referee: Amara, Zitouni, Abdelaziz
Note: Lineup for MC Alger - Belahcène M'Hamed, Maârouf, Berrekia, Senane, Naâmane, Sahnine, Azza, Atbi, Hahad, Zidane, Dahmoun.

9 December 1962 Round 7	JS Kabylie	4–3	MC Alger	Tizi Ouzou
	Abbès 25'; Merad 46' (pen.); Zoubir ?'; Lahrari Moussa 75'	Report	Hahad 6', 42'; Azza ?'	Stadium: Stade Oukil Ramdane; Referee: Benchelha, Benzi, Bouamama
Note: Lineup for MC Alger - Belahcène M'hamed, Berrekia, Senane, Atbi, Naâmane, Sahnine, Azzouz, Azza, Hahad, Dahmoun, Zidane.

20 January 1963 Round 7	JS Kabylie	1–1	MC Alger	Thénia
	Abbès 77'		Zidane 11'	Stadium: Stade de Thenia; Attendance: 0 (close doors); Referee: Loubari, Azzi, Duborg
Note: Lineup for MC Alger - Merkiche, Maârouf, Atbi, Sahnine, Senane, Dahmoun, Azza, Azzouz, Hahad, Zidane, Rezzoug.

23 December 1962 Round 8	MC Alger	1–0	WA Rouiba	Saint-Eugène
	Dahmoun 68'	Report		Stadium: Stade de Saint-Eugène; Referee: Chekaimi, Bendali, Bencherif
Note: Lineup for MC Alger - Merkiche, Maârouf, Senane, Atbi, Naâmane, Sahnine, Azza, Azzouz, Hahad, Dahmoun, Zidane.

6 January 1963 Round 9	ES Aïn Taya	1–4	MC Alger	Aïn Taya
		Report	Hahad 16', 62'; Azzef 27'; Zidane 43'	Stadium: Stade de Aïn Taya; Referee: Benganif, Abdelaziz, Anghar
Note: Lineup for MC Alger - .

20 January 1963 Round 10	RS Alger	0–5	MC Alger	Saint-Eugène
		Report	Oualiken 33'; Hahad 44'; Belkhodja 55' (o.g.); Azzouz 66'; Rezzoug 89'	Stadium: Stade de Saint-Eugène; Referee: Chekaimi
Note: Lineup for MC Alger - Boubekeur, Maârouf, Atbi, Sahnine, Senane, Dahmoun, Azzouz, Oualiken, Hahad (cap), Rezzoug, Zidane.

27 January 1963 Round 11	MC Alger	7–0	JSI Issers	Hamma Annassers
	Azzouz 7', 33', 43'; Rezzoug 18'; Zidane 41', 70'; Oualiken 85'	Report		Stadium: Stade municipal Referee: Chaâbane, Melloud, Cherouati
Note: Lineup for MC Alger - Boubekeur, Maârouf, Senane, Atbi, Sahnine, Dahmoun, Zidane, Oualiken, Hahad (cap), Rezzoug, Azzouz.

10 February 1963 Round 12	MC Alger	1–0	JS Bordj Ménaïel	Saint-Eugène
	Azzouz 60'	Report		Stadium: Stade de Saint-Eugène; Referee: Benganif, Amashri, Benzi
Note: Lineup for MC Alger - Boubekeur, Maârouf, Atbi, Senane, Dahmoun, Sahnine, Azzouz, Azza, Hahad (cap), Oualiken, Zidane.

17 February 1963 Round 13	USM Maison Carrée	0–1	MC Alger	Maison Carrée
		Report	Hahad 8'	Stadium: Stade Lavigerie; Referee: Chekaimi
Note: Lineup for MC Alger - Boubekeur, Djaâfer Bey, Atbi, Sahnine, Senane, Dahmoun, Azzouz, Laâgoun, Hahad, Oualiken, Zidane.

24 February 1963 Round 14	WA Rouiba	1–3	MC Alger	Rouïba
		Report	Hahad 12'; Oualiken 51'; Senane 78'	Stadium: Stade de Rouïba
Note: Lineup for MC Alger - .

10 March 1963 Round 15	AS Dellys	0–2	MC Alger	Dellys
		Report	Haffar 49' (pen.); Atbi 74'	Stadium: Stade de Dellys
Note: Lineup for MC Alger - Boubekeur, Mazari, Atbi, Senane, Haddad, Dahmoun, Haffar, Azza, Hahad, Zidane, Oualiken Amokrane.

17 March 1963 Round 16	MC Alger	7–0	ES Aïn Taya	Saint-Eugène
	Oualiken 12', 30', 80'; Azzouz 22', 85'; Zidane 52'; Haffar 77'	Report		Stadium: Stade de Saint-Eugène; Referee: Benguergoura
Note: Lineup for MC Alger - Boubekeur, Mazari, Maârouf, Haddad, Senane, Sahnine, Azzouz, Haffar, Hahad, Oualiken, Zidane.

24 March 1963 Round 17	MC Alger	2–0	ESM Alger	Saint-Eugène
	Hahad 33'; Arbi 55'	Report		Stadium: Stade de Saint-Eugène
Note: Lineup for MC Alger - Boubekeur, Mazari, Senane, Maârouf, Naâmane, Atbi, Lyassine, Azzouz, Hahad, Oualiken, Zidane.

7 April 1963 Round 18	MC Alger	1–0	JS Kabylie	Saint-Eugène
	Mazari 85'	Report		Stadium: Stade de Saint-Eugène; Referee: Khelifi, Benganif
Note: Lineup for MC Alger - Boubekeur, Mazari, Senane, Maârouf, Naâmane, Atbi, Lyassine, Azzouz, Hahad, Oualiken, Zidane.

== Final Groups ==
=== Algiers ===
Pos	Team	Pld	W	D	L	F	A	GD	Pts	Notes
1	USM Alger	4	4	0	0	15	3	+12	12	
2	MC Alger	4	3	0	1	9	2	+8	10	
3	AS Orléansville	4	2	0	2	5	7	-2	8	
4	NA Hussein Dey	4	1	0	3	7	12	-5	6	
5	OM Saint-Eugène	4	0	0	4	3	15	-12	4	

P = Matches played; W = Matches won; D = Matches drawn; L = Matches lost; F = Goals for; A = Goals against; GD = Goal difference; Pts = Points

11 May 1963 Round 1	MC Alger	1–0	NA Hussein Dey	Saint-Eugène
	Hahad 10' (pen.)			Stadium: Stade de Saint-Eugène; Referee: Benguergoura
Note: Lineup for MC Alger - Boubekeur, Mazari, Maârouf, Atbi, Senane, Naâmane, Azzouz, Hahad (cap), Laâgoun, Oualiken, Zidane

19 May 1963 Round 2	MC Alger	3–0	AS Orléansville	Hamma Annassers
	Azzouz 11', 14'; Oualiken 80' (pen.)			Stadium: Stade municipal Referee: Benganif, Benkortebi, Debbih
Note: Lineup for MC Alger - Boubekeur, Mazari, Atbi, Sahnine, Naâmane, Azzouz, Laâgoun, Hahad (cap), Oualiken, Zidane

26 May 1963 Round 3	MC Alger	4–0	OM Saint-Eugène	Saint-Eugène
	Dahmoune 2'; Hahad 44', 65', 85'			Stadium: Stade de Saint-Eugène; Referee: Naiti
Note: Lineup for MC Alger - Boubekeur, Mazari, Senane, Maârouf, Naâmane, Atbi, Azzouz, Oualiken, Hahad (cap), Dahmoun, Zidane

9 June 1963 Round 4	MC Alger	1–2	USM Alger	Saint-Eugène
15:00	Lâagoun 8'		Meziani 17'; Krimo 39'	Stadium: Stade de Saint-Eugène; Referee: Benzellat
Note: Lineup for MC Alger - Boubekeur, Mazari, Senane, Maârouf, Atbi, Naâmane, Dahmoun, Zidane, Oualiken, Hahad (cap), Laâgoun

=== Final tournament ===
15 June 1963 Semi-finals	MC Alger	4–0	SCM Oran	Hamma Annassers
15:00	Hahad 29' (pen.); Oualiken 40', 49', 53'			Stadium: Stade municipal Referee: Mohamedi, Mezahi
Note: Lineup for MC Alger - Boubekeur, Mazari, Senane, Mâarouf, Atbi, Hahad (cap), Lâagoun, Azzouz, Dahmoun, Oualiken, Zidane.

16 June 1963 Final	USM Alger	3–0	MC Alger	Hamma Annassers
15:00	Belbekri (penalty missed) 36'; Ben Tifour 60'; Krimo 73'; Bernaoui 89'			Stadium: Stade municipal Attendance: 20.000; Referee: Mezahi, Benjadi
Note: Lineup for MC Alger - Boubekeur, Mazari, Atbi, Maârouf, Naâmane, Azzouz, Dahmoun, Laâgoun, Hahad (cap), Oualiken, Zidane.

== Algerian Cup ==
4 November 1962 2 tour régional	MC Alger	4–2	US Bouzareah	Hamma Annassers
	Azzouz 26'; Rezzik 46' (o.g.); Azzef 57', 65'		Cherbali 47'; Zeddane ?'	Stadium: Stade municipal Referee: Borg, Souci, Mahfoud
Note: Lineup for MC Alger - Benberkane, Maârouf, Atbi, Berrekia, Dahmoun, Kouar Sid Ahmed, Haffar, Zidane, Azzef, Hahad, Azzouz.

25 November 1962 3 tour régional	MC Alger	1–2	CC Alger	Saint-Eugène
	Atbi 83'		Bouhired 47'; Tafiani 62'	Stadium: Stade de Saint-Eugène; Referee: Hasni
Note: Lineup for MC Alger - Birem, Maârouf, Berrekia, Atbi, Dahmoun, Naâmane, Haffar, Zidane, Kerbani, Laâgoun, Lyassine.

== Squad information ==
=== Goalscorers ===
Includes all competitive matches. The list is sorted alphabetically by surname when total goals are equal.

No.	Nat.	Player	Pos.	Critériums d'Honneur	Final tournament	Cup	TOTAL
	(Algeria)	Omar Hahad	FW	9	5	0	15
	(Algeria)	Ali Azzouz	FW	8	2	1	11
	(Algeria)	Amokrane Oualiken	FW	6	4	0	10
	(Algeria)	Aziouez Azzef	FW	4	0	2	6
	(Algeria)	Zidane	MF	5	0	0	5
	(Algeria)	Boualem Atbi	DF	2	0	1	3
	(Algeria)	Ahmed Laâgoun	FW	2	1	0	3
	(Algeria)	Abdeldjalil Dahmoun	FW	1	1	0	2
	(Algeria)	Boualem Haffar	FW	2	0	0	2
	(Algeria)	Rezzoug	?	2	0	0	2
	(Algeria)	Sahnine	?	2	0	0	2
	(Algeria)	Nouredine Mazari	DF	1	0	0	1
	(Algeria)	Arbi	?	1	0	0	1
	(Algeria)	Azza	?	1	0	0	1
	(Algeria)	Lyassine	?	1	0	0	1
	(Algeria)	Hamid Benhamou	MF	1	0	0	1
	(Algeria)	Kouar	?	1	0	0	1
Own Goals				1	0	1	2
Totals				49	13	5	65
