= Samir Houhou =

Algerian footballer (born 1968)

Personal information
- Date of birth: 7 September 1968 (age 58)
- Place of birth: Constantine, Algeria
- Height: 1.86 m (6 ft 1 in)
- Position: Forward

Senior career*
Years	Team	Apps	(Gls)
1988–1998	MO Constantine		
1989–1990	→ CR Belouizdad		
1998–2000	NA Hussein Dey		
2000–2001	MO Constantine		
2001–2002	CS Constantine		
2002–2003	NA Hussein Dey		
2003–2004	CA Batna		

Managerial career
- 2021–: US Biskra
- * Club domestic league appearances and goals

Samir Houhou (born 7 September 1968) is a retired Algerian football striker and later manager.
