= 1951–52 MC Alger season =

MC Alger
1951–52 season
- President: Abdellah Benhabyles
- Head coach: Smaïl Khabatou
- Stadium: Stade Communal de Saint Eugène
- Division Honneur: Runners–up
- Forconi Cup: Runners–up
- North African Cup: Round of 16
- Top goalscorer: League: Smaïl Khabatou (6 goals); All: Smaïl Khabatou; Omar Hahad (9 goals)

In the 1951–52 season, MC Alger is competing in the Division Honneur for the 16th season French colonial era, as well as the Forconi Cup and the North African Cup. They competing in Division Honneur, the Forconi Cup and the North African Cup.

== Squad list ==
Players and squad numbers last updated on 30 September 1951.
Note: Flags indicate national team as has been defined under FIFA eligibility rules. Players may hold more than one non-FIFA nationality.

Nat.	Position	Name	Date of Birth (Age)	Signed from
(France)	GK	Mansour Abtouche	10 April 1918 (aged 33)	(France) GS Alger
(France)	GK	Mohamed Zebairi		(France) USM Alger
(France)	GK	M'Hamed Belahcène		(France)
(France)	GK	Ali Yousfi		(France)
(France)	GK	M'Hamed Mekirèche		(France) O Hussein Dey
(France)	GK	Ahmed Meghraoui		(France)
(France)		Mustapha Bouhired		(France) RU Alger
(France)	DF	Smail Khabatou	8 September 1920 (aged 31)	(France) Youth system
(France)	RB	Hassen Hamoutène	26 September 1913 (aged 38)	(France)
(France)		Abdelkader Bouzera dit Abdelaoui		(France)
(France)		Hassen Bennour		(France)
(France)	MF	Hamid Benhamou dit Hamid		(France)
(France)	DF	Sid Ahmed Kouar dit Kouar I	17 May 1924 (aged 27)	(France) RS Alger
(France)		Omar Kouar dit Kouar II		(France)
(France)		Hacène "Ahcène" Kouar dit Kouar III		(France)
(France)		Mohamed Tadjet		(France)
(France)	MF	Abderahmane Deguigui	25 January 1925 (aged 26)	(France)
(France)	FW	Omar Hahad		(France)
(France)	CB	Mohamed "Mohand" Oualiken		(France)
(France)		Mohamed "Amar" Guitoun		(France)
(France)		Rachid Khelil		(France)
(France)		Said Kebaili dit "Khalis"		(France)
(France)		Mohamed Ait Saâda		(France)
(France)		Slimane Aliane		(France)
(France)		Abdeldjalil Dahmoun	17 April 1933 (aged 18)	(France) SCU El Biar
(France)		Hanafi Larabi dit Amirouche "Jackson"		(France)
(France)	DF	Rachid Aftouche	2 November 1933 (aged 17)	(France) GS Alger
(France)		Merzak Ouargli		(France)
(France)		Ahmed Abdi		(France) RS Alger
(France)		Abdelkader Bouzagou		(France)
(France)		Mohamed Benna		(France) CC Alger
(France)		Bachir Belazouz		(France)
(France)		Ahmed Laribi "Sid Ahmed"		(France) JS El Biar
(France)	RW	Amokrane Oualiken	6 April 1933 (aged 18)	(France) Youth system

== Pre-season and friendlies ==
2 September 1951 Coupe Milady	MC Alger	2–3	O Hussein Dey	Saint Eugène
	Deguigui 50' (pen.); Hahad 55' Belahcène (Zebairi), Hamoutène (Kouar Sid Ahmed), Abdelaoui, Dekkari (Khabatou), Bennour, Kouar Sid Ahmed (Benhamou Hamid), Dahmoun (Kouar Omar), Hahad, Oualiken Mohamed, Kebaili (Guitoun), Khelil (Deguigui).	Report	Scriba 10', 40'; Perez 87' Vadel, Andreu Queugnet (Tuduri), Santiago, Montovani, Vial (Belamine), Mokrane, Gomez (Mas), Fez, Belamine (Perez), Serrano (Scriba), Scriba (Vianet ou Vianney).	Stadium: Stade Communal de Saint Eugène; Referee: Riveccio

9 September 1951 Coupe Milady	MC Alger	0–4	AS Saint Eugène	Saint Eugène
	Boubekeur (Videnlocher), Aboulker, Despax, Savona, Valenza, Aouadj Saïd, Alarcon (Buils), Brouel, Bachtarzi, Baeza, Vidal (Alarcon).	Report	Bachtarzi 15'; Vidal (?); Aouadj Said (?); Alarcon (?) Zebairi (Belahcène), Hamoutène (Oualiken Mohamed), Abdelaoui, Khabatou, Bennour, Benhamou Hamid, Kouar Omar, Kouar Sid Ahmed, Guitoun, Oualiken Mohamed (Hahad), Hahad (Deguigui), Khelil.	Stadium: Stade Communal de Saint Eugène; Referee: Garofato

15 March 1952 Friendly	MC Alger	0–4	Stade de Reims	Belcourt
	Belahcène, Hamoutène (Kouar Omar), Oualiken Mohamed, Khabatou, Abdelaoui, Benhamou Hamid, Belbachir, Hahad, Gadi, Kouar Sid Ahmed (Deguigui), Ait Saâda (Dahmoun Abdeldjalil).	Report	Bilard Abenozza, Jacowski, Jonquet, Marche, Penverne, Zimmy (Cicci), Villanova, Kopa, Bilard, Leblond, Apple.	Stadium: Stade municipal Referee: Caratino

== Competitions ==
=== Overview ===
Competition	Record								Started round	Final position / round	First match	Last match
Competition	G	W	D	L	GF	GA	GD	Win %	Started round	Final position / round	First match	Last match
Division Honneur	22	9	10	3	34	30	+4	40.91	—N/a	Runners–up	16 September 1951	27 April 1952
Forconi Cup	4	3	0	1	19	5	+14	75.00	Fourth Round	Runners–up	4 November 1951	15 June 1952
North African Cup	2	1	0	1	1	2	−1	50.00	Fifth Round	Round of 16	2 December 1951	13 January 1952
Total	28	13	10	5	54	37	+17	46.43				

=== Division Honneur ===
==== League table ====
Pos	Team	Pld	W	D	L	GF	GA	GD	Pts	Qualification or relegation
1	AS Saint Eugène (C)	22	8	13	1	43	24	+19	51	Qualified for North African Championship
2	MC Alger	22	9	10	3	34	30	+4	50	
3	RS Alger	22	10	7	5	32	35	−3	49	
4	O Hussein Dey	22	11	4	7	45	33	+12	48	
5	AS Boufarik	22	8	8	6	39	41	−2	45 (Note: 1 point deducted?)	
6	FC Blidéen	22	8	8	6	52	32	+20	45	
7	RU Alger	22	7	7	8	27	31	−4	43	
8	S.Guyotville	22	5	10	7	30	32	−2	42	
9	GS Orléansville	22	6	7	9	38	41	−3	41	
10	USM Blida	22	6	7	9	28	30	−2	41	
11	GS Alger	22	4	8	10	32	44	−12	38	Relegated to 1952–53 First Division
12	USM Marengo	22	4	3	15	24	55	−31	33	Relegated to 1952–53 First Division

(C) Champions

==== Results by round ====
Round	1	2	3	4	5	6	7	8	9	10	11	12	13	14	15	16	17	18	19	20	21	22
Ground	A	H	A	A	H	A	H	A	H	A	H	H	A	H	H	A	H	A	H	A	H	A
Result	L	W	D	W	D	L	W	D	W	D	W	D	D	W	D	D	L	W	W	D	D	W
Position																						2

Updated to match(es) played on 27 April 1952. Source: Competitive matches
A = Away; H = Home; W = Win; D = Draw; L = Loss

=== Matches ===
Win Draw Loss

16 September 1951 Round 1	USM Blida	2–0	MC Alger	Blida
15:10	Mazouz 52', 72'	Report		Stadium: USB Stadium; Attendance: 2.000; Referee: Attanasio J.
Note: Lineup for MC Alger - Zebairi, Abdelaoui, Oualiken, Khabatou, Bennour, Hamid, Kouar A, Guittoun, Hahad, Kouar II, Khelil. Lineup for USM Blida - Menacer, Mansouri, Bekhoucha, Zerrouki, Bouguerra, Madoudou, Zouraghi, Hadji, Bensamet, Mahieddine, Mazouz.

23 September 1951 Round 2	MC Alger	2–0	RU Alger	Saint Eugène
	Dahmoun Abdeldjalil 35', 55'	Report		Stadium: Stade Communal de Saint Eugène; Referee: Gorofalo
Note: Lineup for MC Alger - Belahcène, Khabatou, Abdelaoui, Oualiken Mohamed, Bennour, Benhamou Hamid, Deguigui, Kouar Sid Ahmed dit Kouar I, Guitoun, Hahad, Dahmoun Abdeldjalil. Lineup for RU Alger - Messina, Rocher, Bouvier, Jasseron, Riu, Fiorit, Lorenzo, Riveccio, Brouillet, Baylé, Daube.

29 September 1951 Round 3	O Hussein Dey	1–1	MC Alger	Saint Eugène
	Gomez 20'	Report	Deguigui 48'	Stadium: Stade Communal de Saint Eugène; Referee: Caratino
Note: Lineup for MC Alger - Belahcène, Abdelaoui, Oualiken Mohamed, Khabatou, Benhamou Hamid, Bennour, Deguigui, Dahmoun Abdeldjalil, Hahad, Kouar Sid Ahmed dit Kouar I, Guitoun. Lineup for O Hussein Dey - Vadel, Belamine, Santiago, Montovani, Perret, Mokrane, Fez, Ouzifi, Gomez, Vianet, Scriba.

7 October 1951 Round 4	GS Orléansville	2–3	MC Alger	Orléansville
	Mihoubi 72'; Daoud 75'	Report	Dahmoun Abdeldjalil 35'; Deguigui 63'; Hahad 65'	Referee: Pellegrineschi
Note: Lineup for MC Alger - Belahcène, Abdelaoui, Oualiken Mohamed, Khabatou, Bennour, Benhamou Hamid, Dahmoun ABdeldjalil, Deguigui, Hahad, Kouar Sid Ahmed, Guitoun. Lineup for GS Orléansville - Merle, Mellet, Maiza, Auber, Moussaoui, Bertoli, Martinez, Ketib, Gévaudan, Daoud, Mihoubi.

14 October 1951 Round 5	MC Alger	1–1	AS Boufarik	Saint Eugène
	Benelfoul 58' (o.g.)	Report	Vomero 90'	Stadium: Stade Communal de Saint Eugène; Referee: Mazocchi
Note: Lineup for MC Alger - Belahcène, Abdelaoui, Oualiken Mohamed, Khabatou, Bennour, Benhamou Hamid, Deguigui, Kouar Sid Ahmed, Dahmoun Abdeldjalil, Hahad, Guitoun. Lineup for AS Boufarik - Gervala, Massip, Vicedo, Chazot, Redegonde, Amiel, Benelfoul, Saib Said dit Said Said, Navarro, Defrance, Vomero.

21 October 1951 Round 6	FC Blidéen	4–0	MC Alger	Blida
	Schmidt 10'; Rais (?); Cau (?); Meftah 62'	Report		Stadium: FCB Stadium; Referee: Graziani
Note: Lineup for MC Alger - Belahcène, Khabatou, Oualiken Mohamed, Abdelaoui, Benhamou Hamid, Bennour, Dahmoun Abdelddjalil, Hahad, Kouar Sid Ahmed, Guitoun. Lineup for FC Blidéen - Cano, Riera, Asni, Giner, Sicard, Cau, Schmidt, Gasc, Ruiz, Meftah, Rais.

28 October 1951 Round 7	MC Alger	3–1	USM Marengo	Saint Eugène
	Ait Saâda 4'; Khabatou 5', 85'	Report	Moussaoui 52'	Stadium: Stade Communal de Saint Eugène; Referee: Giner
Note: Lineup for MC Alger - Zebairi, Hamoutène, Kouar Sid Ahmed, Abdelaoui, Oualiken Mohamed, Benhamou Hamid, Hahad, Bennour, Khabatou, Dahmoune Abdeldjalil, Ait Saâda. Lineup for USM Marengo - Saâdi Abdelkader, Djelfi, Moussaoui, Abbés, Boukhalfa, Hocine, Saâdi Ali, Saidi Boualem, Abdet, Baya, Ferhat.

25 November 1951 Round 9	MC Alger	2–1	AS Saint Eugène	Saint Eugène
	Deguigui 26'; Hahad 51'	Report	Boret 71'	Stadium: Stade Communal de Saint Eugène; Referee: Abdelaziz Chekaïmi
Note: Lineup for MC Alger - Zebairi, Hamoutène, Oualiken Mohamed, Khabatou, Abdelaoui, Benhamou Hamid, Deguigui, Bennour, Hahad, Ait Saâda, Aliane. Lineup for AS Saint Eugène - Boubekeur, Oliver, Berenguer, Aboulker, Valemza, Aouadj Said, Boret, Baeza, Alarcon, Collonges, Rouet.

9 December 1951 (Note: The match was originally to be played on 18 November 1951, but it was postponed due to a Coupe Forconi match on 17 November 1951 between GS Alger & O. Littoral.) Round 8	GS Alger	1–1	MC Alger	Belcourt
	Zapata 70'	Report	Ait Sâada 25'	Stadium: Stade municipal Referee: Caratino
Note: Lineup for MC Alger - Zebairi, Hamoutène, Oualiken Mohamed, Khabatou, Abdelaoui, Benhamou Hamid, Ait Sâada, Deguigui, Bennour, Larabi Hanafi, Hahad. Lineup for GS Alger - Pellegrino, Fortuné, Belmonte, Ferrasse, Torres, Calmus A, Biton, Azzef Abdelaziz dit "Aziouez, Deleo, Zapata, Gay.

11 December 1951 Round 10	RS Alger	1–1	MC Alger	Belcourt
	Mohand Maouche 18'	Report	Bennour 70'	Stadium: Stade municipal Referee: Garafalo
Note: Lineup for MC Alger - Zebairi, Hamoutène, Oualiken Mohamed, Khabatou, Abdelaoui, Benhamou Hamid, Ait Saâda, Deguigui, Aliane, Bennour, Hahad. Lineup for RS Alger - Diehl, Magliozzi V, Caillat, Mayens, Zerepha, Saâdi, Gelabert, Magliozzi II, Zaibeck, Llorens, Maouche Mohand.

23 December 1951 Round 11	MC Alger	1–0	S.Guyotville	Saint Eugène
	Ait Sâada 53'	Report		Stadium: Stade Communal de Saint Eugène; Referee: Attanasio
Note: Lineup for MC Alger - Zebairi, Hamoutène, Khabatou, Bennour, Oualiken Mohamed, Benhamou Hamid, Ait Saâda, Abdelaoui, Kouar Sid Ahmed, Deguigui, Hahad. Lineup for S.Guyotville - Zaidi, Salort, Valence, Balester V, De Pasquale, Giorgetti, Balester P, Cambressy, Vitiello, Errera, Mouset.

30 December 1951 Round 12	MC Alger	1–1	USM Blida	Saint Eugène
	Deguigui 70'	Report	Mahieddine 4'	Stadium: Stade Communal de Saint Eugène; Referee: Favre
Note: Lineup for MC Alger - Zebairi, Hamoutène, Oualiken, Khabatou, Hamid, Abdelaoui, Dahmoune, Deguigui, Kouar, Guittoun, Hahad. Lineup for USM Blida - Menacer, Bekhoucha, Mansouri, Madoudou, Hadji, Bouguerra, Mazouz, Zouraghi, Mahieddine, Boumbadji Benyoucef, Dahmane.

20 January 1952 Round 13	RU Alger	2–2	MC Alger	Belcourt
	Forit 15'; Lorenzo 89'	Report	Tadjet 40'; Kouar Sid Ahmed 55' (pen.)	Stadium: Stade municipal Referee: Calvo
Note: Lineup for MC Alger - Zebairi, Kouar Sid Ahmed, Oualiken Mohamed, Khabatou, Abdelaoui, Benhamou Hamid, Ait Saâda, Hahad, Tadjet, Guitoun, Dahmoun Abdeldjalil. Lineup for RU Alger - Denevic, Rocher, Friand, Daube, Faglin, Jasseron, Ferrari, Riu, Bayle, Lorenzo, Fllorit.

27 January 1952 Round 14	MC Alger	3–2	O Hussein Dey	Saint Eugène
	Deguigui 38'; Dahmoune Abdeldjalil 81'; Belamine 87' (o.g.)	Report	Gomez 50', 53'	Stadium: Stade Communal de Saint Eugène; Referee: Giner
Note: Lineup for MC Alger - Zebairi, Kouar Sid Ahmed, Khabatou, Oualiken Mohamed, Benhamou Hamid, Abdelaoui, Dahmoun Abdeldjalil, Hahad, Tadjet, Deguigui, AIt Saâda. Lineup for O Hussein Dey - Vadel, Montovani, Santiago, Coronel, Perret, Belamine, Scriba, Ouzifi, Gomez, Fez, Serrano.

17 February 1952 Round 15	MC Alger	1–1	GS Orléansville	Saint Eugène
	Ait Saâda 67'	Report	Daoud 17'	Stadium: Stade Communal de Saint Eugène; Referee: Cabot
Note: Lineup for MC Alger - Zebairi, Kouar Sid Ahmed, Oualiken Mohamed, Khabatou, Abdelaoui, Benhamou Hamid, Deguigui, Hahad, Ait Saâda, Tadjet, Dahmoun Abdeldjalil. Lineup for GS Orléansville - Merle, Melet, Maeza, Nayrac, Folcher, Bellili, Mihoubi, Gévaudan, Daoud, Bertoli, Monnier.

24 February 1952 Round 16	AS Boufarik	4–4	MC Alger	Boufarik
	Navaro Valentin 3'; Benelfoul 25'; Djoudad 54'; Olcina 69'	Report	Vicédo 40' (o.g.); Belbachir 48'; Hahad 60'; Khabatou 85'	Referee: Riveccio
Note: Lineup for MC Alger - Yousfi, Kouar Sid Ahmed, Oualiken Mohamed, Khabatou, Abdelaoui, Benhamou Hamid, Ait Saâda, Dahmoun Abdeldjalil, Hahad, Belbachir, Deguigui. Lineup for AS Boufarik - Gervais, Massip, Siesse, Chazot, Navarro A, Vicédo, Benelfoul, Navarro Valentin, Djoudad, Roman, Olcina.

23 March 1952 Round 17	MC Alger	1–3	FC Blidéen	Saint Eugène
	Kouar Sid Ahmed 44'	Report	Rais 17', 75'; Asni 74'	Stadium: Stade Communal de Saint Eugène; Referee: Attanasio
Note: Lineup for MC Alger - Abtouche, Hamoutène, Oualiken Mohamed, Khabatou, Abdelaoui, Benhamou Hamid, Kouar Sid Ahmed, Kouar Omar, Belbachir, Hahad, Dahmoun Abdeldjalil. Lineup for FC Blidéen - Raynaud, Asni, Gasc, Giner, Riera, Arnaud, Camand, Schmidt, Meftah, Rais.

30 March 1952 Round 18	USM Marengo	0–2	MC Alger	Marengo
		Report	Khabatou 44', 66'	Stadium: Stade Municipal de Marengo; Referee: Caratino
Note: Lineup for MC Alger - Belahcène, Hamoutène, Ouakiken Mohamed, Kouar Sid Ahmed, Benhamou Hamid, Abdelaoui, Ait Saâda, Belbachir, Khabatou, Ouargli, Hahad. Lineup for USM Marengo - Saâdi Abdelkader, Djelfi, Saâdi Ali, Moussaoui, Saidi Boualem, Bouziane, Bouanène, Touhami, Abbès, Abdat, Ferhat.

13 April 1952 Round 19	MC Alger	1–0	GS Alger	Saint Eugène
	Khabatou 2'	Report		Stadium: Stade Communal de Saint Eugène; Referee: Riveccio
Note: Lineup for MC Alger - Belahcène, Hamoutène, Oualiken Mohamed, Kouar Sid Ahmed, Abdelaoui, Benhamou Hamid, Ait Saâda, Hahad, Khabatou, Guitoun, Khelil. Lineup for GS Alger - Fabiano, Diagne, Belmonte, Fortuné, Daverio, Calmus A, Biton, Gay, Cerdan, Torrès, Déléo.

20 April 1952 Round 20	AS Saint Eugène	1–1	MC Alger	Saint Eugène
	Boret 85'	Report	Belbachir 22'	Stadium: Stade Communal de Saint Eugène; Referee: Abdelaziz Chekaïmi
Note: Lineup for MC Alger - Belahcène, Hamoutène, Oualiken Mohamed, Kouar Sid Ahmed, Benhamou Hamid, Abdelaoui, Ait Saâda, Hahad, Khabatou, Guitoun, Belbachir. Lineup for AS Saint Eugène - Boubekeur, Oliver, Beringuer, Aboulker, Berrah, Valenza, Alarcon, Boret, Rouet, Brouel, Rivas.

27 April 1952 Round 21	MC Alger	1–1	RS Alger	Saint Eugène
	Hahad 14'	Report	Llorens 58'	Stadium: Stade Communal de Saint Eugène; Referee: Boccechiampe
Note: Lineup for MC Alger - Belahcène, Hamoutène, Oualiken Mohamed, Kouar Sid Ahmed, Abdelaoui, Benhamou Hamid, Ait Saâda, Dahmoun Abdeldjalil, Khabatou, Belbachir, Hahad. Lineup for RS Alger - Garcia, Mayens, Caillat, Pons, Vermeuil, Saâdi, Magliozzi I, Maouche Mohand, Zaibek, Magliozzi II, Llorens.

4 May 1952 Round 22	S.Guyotville	1–2	MC Alger	Belcourt
	Vitiello 59'	Report	Khelil 40'; Hahad 65'	Stadium: Stade municipal Referee: Abdelaziz Chekaïmi
Note: Lineup for MC Alger - Belahcène, Hamoutène, Oualiken Mohamed, Kouar Sid Ahmed, Abdelaoui, Benhamou Hamid, Dahmoun Abdeldjalil, Hahad, Khabatou, Belbachir, Khelil. Lineup for S.Guyotville - Fayet, Salort, Ballester V, Benejean, Llorens, Cioffi, De Pasquale, Valence, Vitiello, Georgetti, Gilabert.

== Forconi Cup ==
4 November 1951 Fourth Round	MC Alger	7–0	JS Kabylie	Belcourt
14:15	Hahad 27' (?); Aliane 30'; Ait Saâda (?) (?); Kouar Sid Ahmed 68', 71'	Report		Stadium: Stade municipal Referee: Riveccio
Note: Lineup for MC Alger - Zebairi, Abdelaoui, Oualiken Mohamed, Khabatou, Bennour, Benhamou Hamid, Ait Saâda, Dahmoun Abdeldjalil (Junior), Aliane, Kouar Sid Ahmed dit Kouar I, Hahad. Lineup for JS Kabylie - Mansour, Korogli, Hassoun, Azzoug, Kouffi I, Belhadj, Cherrak, Boukersi, Zemirli, Iratni I, Hameg.

2 December 1951 Fifth Round	AS Saint Eugène	0–1	MC Alger	Saint Eugène
14:00		Report	Hahad 18'	Stadium: Stade Communal de Saint Eugène; Referee: Attanasio
Note: Lineup for MC Alger - Zebairi, Hamoutène, Oualiken, Khabatou, Abdelaoui, Hamid, Saâda, Deguigui, Aliane, Bennour, Hahad. Lineup for AS Saint Eugène - Boubekeur, Aguis, Bérenguer, Aboulker, Oliver, Aouadj, Alarcon, Berrah, Collongues, Baeza, Vidal .

10 May 1952 Quarter-finals	GS Orléansville	1–2	MC Alger	Blida
15:30	Bertoli 49'	Report	Khabatou 25'; Guitoun 69' (pen.)	Stadium: FCB Stadium; Referee: Perez
Note: Lineup for MC Alger - Belahcène, Hamoutène, Larabi Hanafi, Kouar Sid Ahmed, Abdelaoui, Hahad, Dahmoun Abdeldjalil, Belbachir, Guitoun, Khabatou, Khelil. Lineup for GS Orléansville - Merle, Haouari, Melet, Aubert, Belili, Maeza, Gevaudan, Bertoli, Daoud, Mihoubi, Castello.

1 June 1952 Semi-finals	MC Alger	8–1	AS Boufarik	Saint Eugène
16:00	Hahad 12'; Khabatou 17', 84'; Khelil 44' (?); Guitoun 55'; Deguigui 85'; Larabi 89'	Report	Voméro	Stadium: Stade Communal de Saint Eugène; Referee: Cabot
Note: Lineup for MC Alger - Belahcène, Hamoutène, Abdelaoui, Kouar Sid Ahmed, Hahad, Benhamou Hamid, Larabi Hanafi, Deguigui, Khabatou, Guitoun, Khelil. Lineup for AS Boufarik - Winium, Massip, Chazot, Amiel, Siesse, Benelfoul, Voméro, Saib Ali dit Said Said, Reichert, Navarro V.

15 June 1952 Final	FC Blida	3–1	MC Alger	Belcourt
15:00	Ruiz 30'; Rais 64'; Meftah 89'	Report	Gasq 2' (o.g.)	Stadium: Stade municipal Referee: Attanasio
Note: Lineup for MC Alger - Belahcène, Hamoutène, Abdelaoui, Kouar Sid Ahmed, Oualiken Mohamed, Benhamou Hamid, Deguigui, Hahad, Khabatou, Guitoun, Khelil. Lineup for FC Blida - Reynaud, Giner, Gasq, Hasni, Arnaud, Sicart, Schmidt, Camand, Meftah, Ruiz, Rais.

== North African Cup ==
13 January 1952 Round of 16	ÉS Sahel	2–0	MC Alger	Tunis
	Naija 38'; Mougou 55'	Report		Stadium: Stade Géo André; Referee: Mailly
Note: Lineup for MC Alger - Zebairi, Hamoutène, Oualiken Mohamed, Khabatou, Abdelaoui, Benhamou Hamid, Ait Saâda, Deguigui, Kouar Sid Ahmed, Guitoun, Hahad. Lineup for ÉS Sahel - Douik, Lamti, Naceur, Dhaou, Cheatta, Mouldi, Djembi, Chetali, Mougou, Rachid, Naija.

== Squad information ==
=== Playing statistics ===
No.	Pos	Nat	Player	Total		Division Honneur		Forconi Cup		North African Cup	
No.	Pos	Nat	Player	Apps	Goals	Apps	Goals	Apps	Goals	Apps	Goals
Goalkeepers
	GK	(France) FRA	Mansour Abtouche	0	0	0	0	0	0	0	0
	GK	(France) FRA	Mohamed Zebairi	0	0	0	0	0	0	0	0
	GK	(France) FRA	M'Hamed Belahcène	0	0	0	0	0	0	0	0
	GK	(France) FRA	Ali Yousfi	0	0	0	0	0	0	0	0
	GK	(France) FRA	M'Hamed Mekirèche	0	0	0	0	0	0	0	0
	GK	(France) FRA	Ahmed Meghraoui	0	0	0	0	0	0	0	0
		(France) FRA	Mustapha Bouhired	0	0	0	0	0	0	0	0
	DF	(France) FRA	Smail Khabatou	0	0	0	0	0	0	0	0
	DF	(France) FRA	Hassen Hamoutène	0	0	0	0	0	0	0	0
		(France) FRA	Abdelkader Bouzera	0	0	0	0	0	0	0	0
		(France) FRA	Hassen Bennour	0	0	0	0	0	0	0	0
		(France) FRA	Hamid Benhamou	0	0	0	0	0	0	0	0
	DF	(France) FRA	Sid Ahmed Kouar	0	0	0	0	0	0	0	0
		(France) FRA	Omar Kouar	0	0	0	0	0	0	0	0
		(France) FRA	Hacène "Ahcène" Kouar	0	0	0	0	0	0	0	0
		(France) FRA	Mohamed Tadjet	0	0	0	0	0	0	0	0
	MF	(France) FRA	Abderahmane Deguigui	0	0	0	0	0	0	0	0
	FW	(France) FRA	Omar Hahad	0	0	0	0	0	0	0	0
	DF	(France) FRA	Mohamed "Mohand" Oualiken	0	0	0	0	0	0	0	0
		(France) FRA	Mohamed "Amar" Guitoun	0	0	0	0	0	0	0	0
		(France) FRA	Rachid Khelil	0	0	0	0	0	0	0	0
		(France) FRA	Said Kebaili	0	0	0	0	0	0	0	0
		(France) FRA	Mohamed Ait Saâda	0	0	0	0	0	0	0	0
		(France) FRA	Slimane Aliane	0	0	0	0	0	0	0	0
		(France) FRA	Abdeldjalil Dahmoun	0	0	0	0	0	0	0	0
		(France) FRA	Hanafi Larabi	0	0	0	0	0	0	0	0
	DF	(France) FRA	Rachid Aftouche	0	0	0	0	0	0	0	0
		(France) FRA	Merzak Ouargli	0	0	0	0	0	0	0	0
		(France) FRA	Ahmed Abdi	0	0	0	0	0	0	0	0
		(France) FRA	Abdelkader Bouzagou	0	0	0	0	0	0	0	0
		(France) FRA	Mohamed Benna	0	0	0	0	0	0	0	0
		(France) FRA	Bachir Belazouz	0	0	0	0	0	0	0	0
		(France) FRA	Ahmed Laribi "Sid Ahmed"	0	0	0	0	0	0	0	0
	MF	(France) FRA	Amokrane Oualiken	0	0	0	0	0	0	0	0

=== Goalscorers ===
Includes all competitive matches. The list is sorted alphabetically by surname when total goals are equal.

Nat.	Player	Pos.	DH	FC	NAC	TOTAL
(France)	Omar Hahad	FW	5	4	0	9
(France)	Smail Khabatou	DF	6	3	0	9
(France)	Abderahmane Deguigui	MF	5	1	0	6
(France)	Mohamed Ait Saâda		4	2	0	6
(France)	Abdeldjalil Dahmoun		4	0	0	4
(France)	Sid Ahmed Kouar	DF	2	2	0	4
(France)	Mohamed "Amar" Guitoun		0	2	0	2
(France)	Rachid Khelil		0	2	0	2
(France)	Belbachir		2	0	0	2
(France)	Slimane Aliane		0	1	0	1
(France)	Hanafi Larabi		0	1	0	1
(France)	Hassen Bennour		1	0	0	1
(France)	Mohamed Tadjet		1	0	0	1
(France)	Rachid Khelil		1	0	0	1
Own Goals			3	1	0	4
Totals			34	19	0	53
