= 1952–53 USM Blida season =

USM Blida
1952–53 season
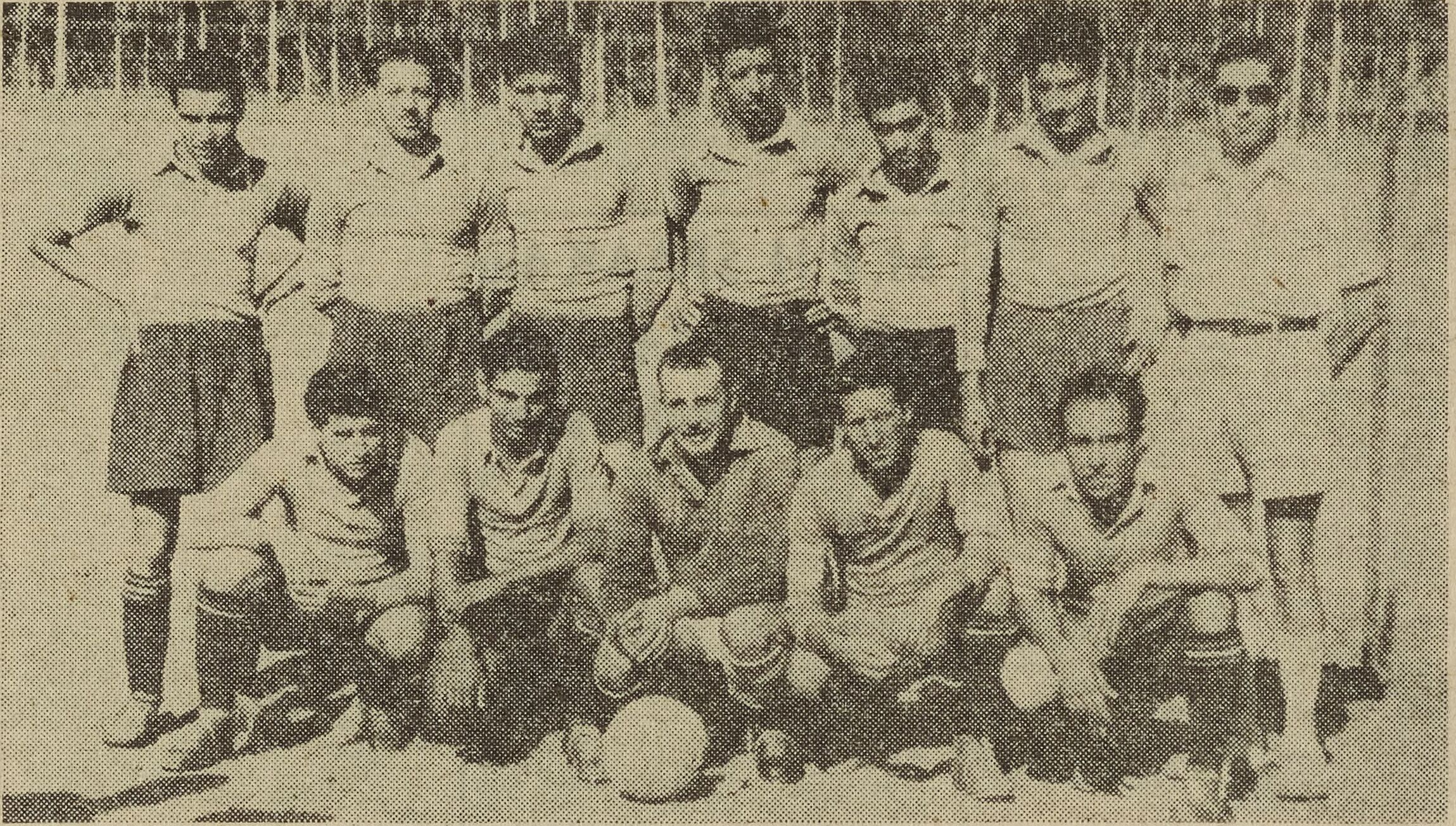
- President: Bachir Abdelouahab
- Head coach: Mohamed Benhoura
- Stadium: USB Stadium, Blida
- Division Honneur: 11th /12
- Forconi Cup: Semi-final
- Top goalscorer: League: Benyoucef Boumbadji (5); All: Benyoucef Boumbadji (6)
- Highest home attendance: 3,000 (vs MC Alger, 23 November 1952)
- Lowest home attendance: 1,800 (vs Stade Guyotville, 14 September 1952)
- Average home league attendance: 2,194
- Biggest win: 5–3 v SCU El-Biar, 10 May 1953
- Biggest defeat: 0–4 v FC Blida, 12 April 1953
Home colours

In the 1952–53 season, USM Blida competed in the Division Honneur for the 20th season French colonial era, as well as the Forconi Cup. They competed in Division Honneur, and the Forconi Cup.

== Pre-season and friendlies ==
31 August 1952 Round 1	AS Boufarik	0–0 (4-2 corners)	USM Blida	Marengo
	Minana (Buc), Massip, Siesse (Chazot), Reguieg, Schmidt, Roman (Pérez), Alonzo, Reichert, Djoudad, Saib, Navarro	Report	Meradi, Madoudou, Zerrouki, Bekhoucha, Boudjeltia, Benhamouda, Bahlouli, Zahzah, Yahia, Rezig Mohamed, Fellous	Referee: M. Khelifi

31 August 1952 Round 2	Olympique de Marengo	0–5	USM Blida	Marengo
	Duhin, Cortès (Papillon), Miramond, Torrès, Papillon, Bianchi, Turbessi, Chatelaine, Bourgeois, Saidi, Menil	Report	Bahlouli; Brakni; Meradi, Rezig Mohamed, Zerrouki, Bekhoucha, Boudjeltia, Madoudou, Brinis, Bahlouli, Brakni, Dahmane, Begga	Referee: M. Khelifi

== Competitions ==
=== Overview ===
Competition	Record								Started round	Final position / round	First match	Last match
Competition	G	W	D	L	GF	GA	GD	Win %	Started round	Final position / round	First match	Last match
Division Honneur	22	8	4	10	23	27	−4	36.36	—	10th	14 September 1952	3 May 1953
Forconi Cup	4	3	0	1	5	5	+0	75.00	Fourth Round	Semi-final	4 November 1951	12 April 1953
Playoffs	1	1	0	0	5	3	+2	100.00	—	—	10 May 1953	10 May 1953
Total	27	12	4	11	33	35	−2	44.44				

=== Division Honneur ===
==== League table ====
Pos	Team	Pld	W	D	L	GF	GA	GD	Pts	Qualification or relegation
1	FC Blida (C)	22	10	9	3	41	25	+16	51	Qualified for North African Championship
2	MC Alger	22	7	10	5	26	23	+3	46	
3	GS Orléansville	22	8	8	6	27	19	+8	46	
4	Olympique de Marengo	22	9	5	8	34	35	−1	45	
5	AS Saint Eugène	22	8	7	7	26	22	+4	45	
6	AS Boufarik	22	9	4	9	30	34	−4	44	
7	Olympique d'Hussein Dey	22	8	6	8	24	27	−3	44	
8	RS Alger	22	7	7	8	21	20	+1	43	
9	Stade Guyotville	22	6	9	7	30	33	−3	43	
10	USM Blida	22	8	4	10	23	27	−4	42	Qualification for relegation play-offs
11	SCU El Biar (R)	22	6	8	8	21	24	−3	42	Qualification for relegation play-offs
12	RU Alger (R)	22	4	7	11	20	28	−8	37	Relegated to 1953–54 First Division

Source: L'Écho d'Alger
(C) Champions; (R) Relegated

==== Results by round ====
Round	1	2	3	4	5	6	7	8	9	10	11	12	13	14	15	16	17	18	19	20	21	22
Ground	H	A	H	A	H	A	H	A	H	H	A	A	H	A	H	A	H	A	H	A	A	H
Result	L	W	L	D	L	L	W	W	L	W	W	L	D	W	D	D	L	L	L	W	L	W
Position	11	8	7	9	11	11	10	7	8	8	5	6	6	5	5	9	10	9	9	9	11	10

Updated to match(es) played on 27 April 1953. Source: Competitive matches
A = Away; H = Home; W = Win; D = Draw; L = Loss

=== Matches ===
Win Draw Loss

14 September 1952 Round 1	USM Blida	0–1	Stade Guyotville	Blida
	Meradi, Bekhoucha Raouti, Zerrouki, Rezig Mohamed, Boudjeltia, Yahia, Begga, Madoudou, Dahmane, Brakni, Boumbadji.	Report	Cambrésy 48' Zaidi, Salord, Ballester V., Errera, Elorrens, Haddad, Cambrésy, Bonnet, Vitiello, Clofei, Cuba	Stadium: USB Stadium; Attendance: 1.800; Referee: M. Attanasio Janvier

21 September 1952 Round 2	AS Saint Eugène	1–2	USM Blida	Saint Eugène
	Valenza 49' Schneider, Aboulker, Bérenguer, Oliver, Valenza, Nuevo, Alarcon, Brouel, Rouet, Boret, Buffard	Report	Boumbadji 5'; Dahmane 64' Meradi, Rezig Mohamed, Mansouri, Zerrouki, Boudjeltia, Bekhoucha Raouti, Mahieddine, Chalane, Brakni, Dahmane, Boumbadji	Stadium: Stade Communal de Saint Eugène; Attendance: 6.500; Referee: M. Rivieccio

28 September 1952 Round 3	USM Blida	2–4	RS Alger	Blida
	Boudjeltia 71' (pen.), 81'; Bekhoucha Raouti (red card) 66'; Meradi, Zerrouki, Bekhoucha Raouti, Mansouri, Boudjeltia, Madoudou, Zahzah, Chalane, Brakni, Dahmane, Boumbadji	Report	Maouch 30', 41' (red card) 66'; Ponsetti 64' (88); Diehl, Senane, Mayence, Vermeuil, Magliozzi, Said, Maouch, Llorens, Ponsetti, Zaibek, Camaret	Stadium: USB Stadium; Attendance: 2.500; Referee: M. Mazzochi

5 October 1952 Round 4	FC Blida	0–0	USM Blida	Blida
	Guarguillo, Giner, Gasque Paul, Hasni, Jelineck, Riéra, Espi, Camand, Meftah, Sicard, Rais	Report	Meradi, Bouguerra, Mansouri, Echikr Abdelkader (injured 72'); Hadji, Boudjeltia; Sebkhaoui, Chalane, Mahieddine, Brakni, Boumbadji	Stadium: USB Stadium; Attendance: 2.500; Referee: M. Kerrachi

12 October 1952 Round 5	USM Blida	1–2	AS Boufarik	Blida
	Hadji 54' Meradi, Bouguerra, Mansouri, Zerrouki, Hadji, Boudjeltia, Kebaili ou Sebkhaoui, Chalane, Mahieddine, Brakni, Boumbadji	Report	Navarro Antoine 5', 24' Buc, Massip, Chazot, Schmidt, Roman, Riechert, Said-Said, Navarro A., Navarro V., Vimum	Stadium: USB Stadium; Attendance: 2.700; Referee: M. Khalfoun

19 October 1952 Round 6	SCU El-Biar	3–1	USM Blida	El-Biar
	Vidal 74'; Moungad 76'; Sardi 80' Benoit, Bonnemaiso, Chakor, P. Vidal, Catrier, De Villeuneuve, Sardi, H. Vidal, Espinos, Moungad, Falzon	Report	Boumbadji 67' Meradi, Bouguerra, Mansouri, Zouakou, Hadji, Madoudou, Chalane, Boudjeltia, Mahieddine, Brakni, Boumbadji	Attendance: 2.000; Referee: M. Vals

26 October 1952 Round 7	USM Blida	3–0	Olympique d'Hussein Dey	Blida
	Madoudou 47'; Brakni 63'; Mahieddine 77' Meradi, Mansouri, Zouakou, Bouguerra, Hadji, Boudjeltia, Yahia, Madoudou, Mahieddine, Brakni, Boumbadji	Report	Sanchez, Santiago, Tudori, Kamal, Scriba, Corolen, Lefumat, Fez, Gomez, Senane, Vals	Stadium: USB Stadium; Attendance: 2.600; Referee: M. Salort

16 November 1952 Round 8	RU Alger	0–1	USM Blida	Belcourt
	Lavoignat, Rocher, Brouillet, Daube, Friand, Dubuc, Lorenzo, Florit, Sarrazin, Haffar, Ferrari	Report	Mahieddie 3' Bayou, Bouguerra, Mansouri, Bekhoucha Raouti, Hadji, Boudjeltia, Bensamet, Madoudou, Mahieddine, Brakni, Boumbadji	Stadium: Stade municipal Referee: M. Vals

23 November 1952 Round 9	USM Blida	0–1	MC Alger	Blida
	Bayou, Bouguerra, Mansouri, Rezig Mohamed, Hadji, Boudjeltia, Bensamet, Bekhoucha Raouti, Mahieddine, Brakni, Boumbadji	Report	Deguigui 76' Mekirèche, Hamoutène, Kouar, Hamid, Deguigui, Ouargli, Dahmoun, Abdelaoui, Oualiken, Lekhal, Hahah	Stadium: USB Stadium; Attendance: 3.000; Referee: M. Lapasset

7 December 1952 Round 10	USM Blida	1–0	GS Orléansville	Blida
	Boudjeltia 50' Bayou, Rezig Mohamed, Mansouri, Bekhoucha Raouti, Hadji, Bouguerra, Madoudou, Boudjeltia, Mahieddine, Dahmane, Boumbadji	Report	Merle, Aubert, Baiza, Mellet, Da Silva, Messaoui Benali, Daoud, Mihoubi, Gévaudan, Kettib, Zourgane	Stadium: USB Stadium; Attendance: 2.000; Referee: M. Fourrier

21 December 1952 Round 11	Olympique de Marengo	2–3	USM Blida	Marengo
	Lanata 20'; Loza 72' Duhin, Mougeot, Miramond, Torrent, Navarette, Bessonne, Loza, Lanata, Chatelaine, Yantrène, Turbessy	Report	Dahmane 28'; Boumbadji 38', 55' Bayou, Rezig Mohamed, Mansouri, Bekhoucha Raouti, Hadji, Bouguerra, Begga, Boudjeltia, Mahieddine, Dahmane, Boumbadji	Attendance: 2.100; Referee: M. Attanasio A.

28 December 1952 Round 12	Stade Guyotville	3–0	USM Blida	Guyotville
	Vitiello ?', ?' (pen.); Errera Zaidi, Lubrano, Ballester V., De Pasquale, Gioffi, Haddadi, Camrési, Llorens, Vitiello, Lekhal, Herréra>		Bayou, Rezig Mohamed, Mansouri, Bekhoucha Raouti, Bouguerra, Hadji, Begga, Boudjeltia, Mahieddine, Dahmane, Boumbadji	Attendance: 1.100; Referee: M. Kerrachi

18 January 1953 Round 13	USM Blida	0–0	AS Saint Eugène	Blida
	Bayou, Bouguerra, Mansouri, Bekhoucha Raouti, Zouakou, Hadji, Sebkhaoui, Boudjeltia, Brakni, Dahmane, Boumbadji	Report	Schneider, Bourkika, Beringuer, Aboulker, Valenza, Berah, Favre, Brouel, Aouadj, Buffard, Rivas	Stadium: USB Stadium; Attendance: 3.000; Referee: M. Giner

25 January 1953 Round 14	RS Alger	0–2	USM Blida	Belcourt
	Diehl, Vermeuil, Caillat, Llorens, Mayans, Magliozzi I, Maouch, Salem, Ponsetti, Magliozzi II, Zaibeck	Report	Brakni 35'; Sebkhaoui 57' Bayou, Bekhoucha Raouti, Mansouri, Bouguerra, Madoudou, Hadji, Sebkhaoui, Boudjeltia, Brakni, Dahmane, Ousser	Stadium: Stade municipal Referee: M. Fourrié

15 February 1953 Round 15	USM Blida	3–3	FC Blida	Blida
	Boumbadji 46'; Brakni 56'; Sebkhaoui 63' Bayou, Bouguerra, Mansouri, Bekhoucha Raouti, Hadji, Madoudou, Sebkhaoui, Boudjeltia, Brakni, Dahmane, Boumbadji	Report	Sicard 9'; Rahis 19'; Ruiz 51' Guarguillo, Casc, Hasni, Riéra, Giner, Espi, Camand, Ruiz, Sicard, Meftah, Rahis	Stadium: USB Stadium; Attendance: 2.500; Referee: M. Riveccio

22 February 1953 Round 16	AS Boufarik	0–0	USM Blida	Boufarik
	Gehin, Massip, Reguieg, Navarro A., Schmidt, Pérez, Briones, Voméro, Said, Reichert, Navarro V.	Report	Bayou, Bouguerra, Mansouri, Bekhoucha Raouti, Boudjeltia, Hadji, Ousser, Dahmane, Bahlouli Ben Lakdar, Brakni, Madoudou	Attendance: 1.800; Referee: M. Salort

1 March 1953 Round 17	USM Blida	0–1	SCU El Biar	Blida
	Bayou, Bouguerra, Mansouri, Bekhoucha Raouti, Hadji, Madoudou, Sebkhaoui, Boudjeltia, Brakni, Dahmane, Ousser	Report	Balogh 7' Benoit, Bennemaiso, Chakor, Vidal P. Gorgue, De Villeneuve, Gimenez, Figuières, Lopez, Boukoussa, Balogh	Stadium: USB Stadium; Attendance: 2.000; Referee: M. Belkessa

15 March 1953 Round 18	Olympique d'Hussein Dey	1–0	USM Blida	Hussein Dey
	Perret 83' Erhard, Montovani, Fiol, Vals, Santiago, Scriba, Perret, Serrano, Gomez, Lefumat, Saidi	Report	Bayou, Bouguerra, Bekhoucha Raouti, Hadji, Mansouri, Boudjeltia, Ousser, Madoudou, Brakni, Dahmane, Boumbadji	Stadium: Stade Communal de Hussein Dey; Attendance: 2.000; Referee: M. Derradji

29 March 1953 Round 19	USM Blida	0–1	RU Alger	Blida
	Bayou, Mansouri, Bouguerra, Bekhoucha Raouti, Hadji, Boudjeltia, Madoudou, Brakni, Mahieddine, Boumbadji, Ousser	Report	Baylé 80' Durandeu, Ségura, Brouillet, Bousier, Tréand, Jasseron, Coll, Riveccio, Baylé, Lorenzo, Rocher	Stadium: USB Stadium; Referee: M. Attanasio Janvier

19 April 1953 Round 20	MC Alger	0–1	USM Blida	Saint Eugène
	Mekidèche, Aftouche, Kouar, Smaïl Khabatou, Ouargli, Hamid, Dahmoune, Gadi, Bouhired, Guitoun, Hahad	Report	Mahieddine 6' Bayou, Bouguerra, Mansouri, Bekhoucha Raouti, Hadji, Boudjeltia, Dahmane, Brakni, Mahieddine, Ousser, Boumbadji	Stadium: Stade Communal de Saint Eugène; Referee: M. Riveccio

26 April 1953 Round 21	GS Orléansville	3–1	USM Blida	Orléansville
	Daoud 56'; Gevaudan 58'; Bertoli 62' Merle, Aubert, Maiza, Mellet, Messaoui Benali, Da Silva, Bertoli, Zorgane, Gevaudan, Mihoubi	Report	Chalane 14' Bayou, Bekhoucha Raouti, Mansouri, Bouguerra, Hadji, Boudjeltia, Begga, Chalane, Mahieddine, Dahmane, Ousser	Stadium: Stade Joseph Robert; Referee: M. Lapasset

3 May 1953 Round 22	USM Blida	2–1	Olympique de Marengo	Blida
	Chalane 19'; Mahieddine 22' Bayou, Zerrouki, Bekhoucha Raouti, Bouguerra, Hadji, Yahia, Bensamet, Chalane, Mahieddine, Ousser, Boudjeltia	Report	Miramond 33' Duhin, Mongeot, Dreuil, Abba, Lanata, Navaret, Chatelaine, Zoubir, Miramont, Loza, Turbessy	Stadium: USB Stadium; Attendance: 2.200; Referee: M. Attanasio

=== Play-off ===
10 May 1953 1	USM Blida	5–3	SCU El-Biar	Belcourt
15h 30	Hadji 2'; Bensamet 39', 75'; Brakni 43'; Yahia 44' Bayou, Bouguerra, Bekhoucha Raouti, Ousser, Hadji, Chalane, Bensamet, Yahia, Mahieddine, Brakni, Boumbadji	Report	Balogh 5'; De Villeneuve 72', 82' Benolt, Vidal P, Chakor, Gorgue, Gimenez, De Villeneuve, Boukoussa, Vidal H, Lopez, Falzon, Balogh	Stadium: Stade municipal Attendance: 1.800; Referee: M. Rivieccio

== Forconi Cup ==
2 November 1952 4th	USM Blida	2–1	GS Alger	Boufarik
	Boumbadji 3'; Hadji 71' Meradi, Bekhoucha Raouti, Mansouri, Bouguerra, Hadji, Boudjeltia, Madoudou, Brakni, Bahlouli Ben Lakdar, Mahieddine, Boumbadji	Report	Déléo 32' Fabiano, Ferrasse, Belmonte, Salva, Calmus, Torrès, Gambarutti, Fortuné, Biton, Cerdan, Déléo	Attendance: 6.167; Referee: M. Rivieccio

30 November 1952 5th	USM Blida	2–0	AS Kouba	Algiers
	Boudjeltia 20'; Hadji 63' Bayou, Bekhoucha Raouti, Mansouri, Rezig Mohamed, Bouguerra, Hadji, Boumbadji, Brakni, Mahieddine, Boudjeltia, Chalane	Report	Candéla, Ouil, Ariandis, Poizat, Amraoui, Guillaumin, Chambon, Martinache, Hadadi, Impérato, Rossetti	Stadium: 20 August 1955 Stadium (Algiers)

22 March 1953 Quarter-final	USM Blida	1–0	RS Alger	Boufarik
	Zerrouki 87' Bayou; Bekhoucha Raouti, Mansouri, Madoudou, Hadji, Boudjeltia, Zouakou; Brakni, Zerrouki, Boumbadji, Ousser	Report	Diehl, Flexas, Mayans, Senane, Zérapha, Berterent, Vermeuil, Salem, Maouche, MAgliozzi II, Llorens	Attendance: 1.000; Referee: M. Attanasio

12 April 1953 Semi-final	FC Blida	4–0	USM Blida	Blida
	Meftah 20', 26', 32'; Rahis 74' Garguillo, Cau, Gasque Paul, Hasni, Sicard, Riéra, Espi, Torrès, Meftah, Ruiz, Rais	Report	Bayou, Mansouri, Bouguerra, Bekhoucha Raouti, Yahia, Hadji, Bensamet, Chalane, Mahieddine, Dahmane, Ousser	Stadium: FCB Stadium; Attendance: 1.800; Referee: M. Khelifi

== North African Cup ==
4 January 1953 Round of 16	SC Bel-Abbès	4–0	USM Blida	Oran
	Amato Olmiccia 7', 55', 77'; Djilali Aber 85' Di Orio; Jean-Pierre Martinez; Cano; Manolo Rodriguez; Domingo; Slimane Benyamina; Djilali Aber; Antoine Diaz; Hubert Gros (c); Beraguas; Amato Olmiccia René Rebibo	Report	Saïd Bayou; Rezig; Ali Mansouri; Routhi Bekhoucha; Rachid Hadji; Belkacem Bouguerra (c); Mohamed Boudjeltia; Mokhtar Dahmane; Rabah Zerrouki; Braham Brakni; Benyoucef Boumbadji Ahmed Benhoura	Stadium: Stade Monréal; Attendance: 4.500; Referee: Morocco Franco

== Squad information ==
=== Playing statistics ===
Pos.	Name	Division Honneur																						FC				PO	PO	Total
Pos.	Name	1	2	3	4	5	6	7	8	9	10	11	12	13	14	15	16	17	18	19	20	21	22	1	2	3	4	1	1	Total
GK	Bayou								X	X	X	X	X	X	X	X	X	X	X	X	X	X	X		X	X	X	X	X	20
GK	Meradi	X	X	X	X	X	X	X																X						8
DF	Mansouri		X	X	X	X	X	X	X	X	X	X	X	X	X	X	X	X	X	X	X	X		X	X	X	X		X	25
DF	Bekhoucha Raouti	X	X	X	Suspended				X	X	X	X	X	X	X	X	X	X	X	X	X	X	X	X	X	X	X	X	X	24
DF	Bouguerra				X	X	X	X	X	X	X	X	X	X	X	X	X	X	X	X	X	X	X	X	X		X	X	X	24
DF	Rezig	X	X							X	X	X	X												X				X	8
DF	Zerrouki	X	X	X	SS	X																	X			X			X	7
DF	Soum Yahia	X						X															X				X	X		5
DF	Zouakou						X	X						X												X				4
DF	Begga	X										X	X									X								4
DF	Zahzah			X																										1
DF	Echikr				X																									1
MF	Boudjeltia	X	X	X	X	X	X	X	X	X	X	X	X	X	X	X	X	X	X	X	X	X	X	X	X	X			X	26
MF	Madoudou	X		X			X	X	X		X				X	X	X	X	X	X				X		X				14
FW	Hadji				X	X	X	X	X	X	X	X	X	X	X	X	X	X	X	X	X	X	X	X	X	X	X	X	X	25
FW	Brakni	X	X	X	X	X	X	X	X	X				X	X	X	X	X	X	X	X			X	X	X		X	X	22
FW	Boumbadji	X	X	X	X	X	X	X	X	X	X	X	X	X		X			X	X	X			X	X	X		X	X	22
FW	Mahieddine		X		X	X	X	X	X	X	X	X	X							X	X	X	X	X	X		X	X		18
FW	Dahmane	X	X	X							X	X	X	X	X	X	X	X	X		X	X					X		X	16
FW	Ousser														X		X	X	X	X	X	X	X			X	X	X		11
FW	Chalane		X	X	X	X	X															X	X		X		X	X		10
FW	Sebkhaoui				X									X	X	X		X												5
FW	Bensamet								X	X													X				X	X		5
FW	Bahlouli																X							X						2
FW	Kebaili					X																								1

=== Goalscorers ===

USM Blida 1952-1953

Includes all competitive matches. The list is sorted alphabetically by surname when total goals are equal.

Nat.	Player	Pos.	DH	FC	PO	TOTAL
(Algeria)	Benyoucef Boumbadji	FW	5	1	0	6
(Algeria)	Sid Ali Mahieddine	FW	4	0	0	4
(Algeria)	Mohamed Boudjeltia	MF	3	1	0	4
(Algeria)	Braham Brakni	FW	3	0	1	4
(Algeria)	Rachid Hadji	FW	1	2	1	4
(Algeria)	Mokhtar Dahmane	FW	2	0	0	2
(Algeria)	M'hamed Sebkhaoui	FW	2	0	0	2
(Algeria)	Belkacem Chalane	FW	2	0	0	2
(Algeria)	Kaddour Bensamet	FW	2	0	2	2
(Algeria)	Mohamed Madoudou	MF	1	0	0	1
(Algeria)	Rabah Zerrouki	DF	0	1	0	1
(Algeria)	Yahia Soum	DF	0	0	1	1
Own Goals			0	0	0	0
Totals			23	5	5	33

== Transfers ==
La liste complète des mutations dans la ligue d'Alger (F.F.F.)

=== In ===
Pos	Player	From club
	Mohamed Kritli	FC Blida
	Mohamed Abbad	US Blida
	M'hamed Benhafessa	US Blida
	Abded Ghomari	US Blida
	Mohamed Boudjeltia	SCM Blida

=== Out ===
Pos	Player	To club
GK	Abderrahmane Menacer	FC Blida
	Mustapha Djellouli	SCM Blida

== Youths teams ==
Reserve team
Position: 3

Pos	Team	Pld	W	D	L	GF	GA	GD	Pts
1	USM Blida	22	8	7	7	0	0	0	45

Source: Source

Third team
Position: 1

Pos	Team	Pld	W	D	L	GF	GA	GD	Pts
1	USM Blida	18	12	5	1	0	0	0	47

Junior team
Position: 6

Pos	Team	Pld	W	D	L	GF	GA	GD	Pts
1	USM Blida	22	9	4	9	0	0	0	44

Cadet team
Position: 6

Pos	Team	Pld	W	D	L	GF	GA	GD	Pts
1	USM Blida	20	5	6	9	0	0	0	36

Minime team
Position: 7

Pos	Team	Pld	W	D	L	GF	GA	GD	Pts
1	USM Blida	20	4	7	9	0	0	0	35
