= 1954–55 USM Blida season =

USM Blida
1954–55 season
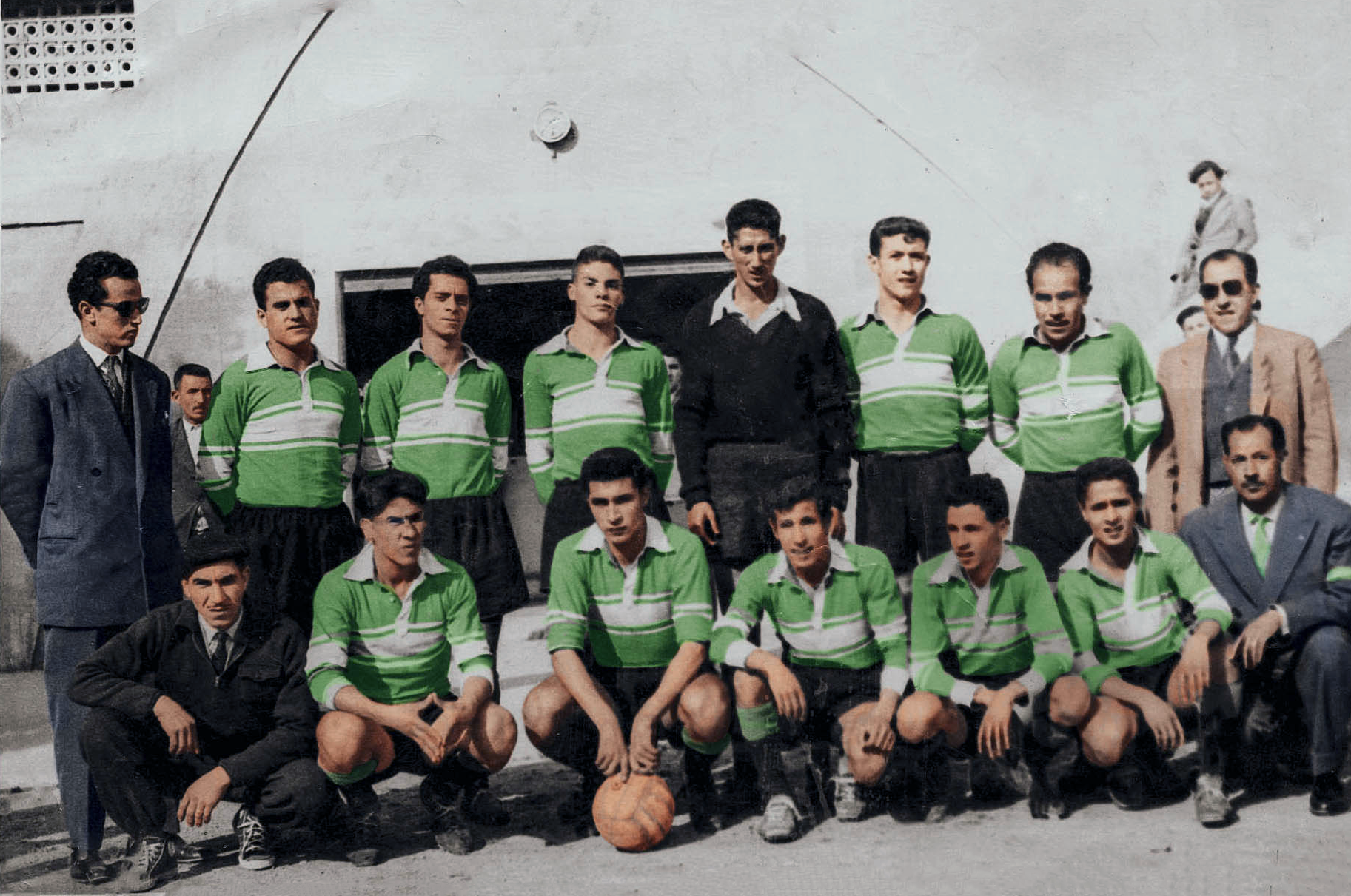
- President: Mustapha Hadji
- Head coach: Smaïl Khabatou
- Stadium: USB Stadium, Blida
- Division Honneur: 5th
- Forconi Cup: Fifth Round
- Top goalscorer: League: Abdelkader Mazouz (7); All: Abdelkader Mazouz (12)
Home colours

In the 1954–55 season, USM Blida competed in the Division Honneur for the 22nd season French colonial era, as well as the Forconi Cup. They competed in Division Honneur, and the Forconi Cup.

== Review ==
The 1954–1955 season is considered one of the most successful seasons, as the team achieved one of its best results in the league since its promotion to the Division Honneur in 1947. This success came during the second season of coach Smaïl Khabatou at the head of the technical staff, where he continued his work in building a strong and competitive team.

USM Blida finished the season in fifth place with 44 points, a remarkable achievement that reflected the club's stability and progress. Throughout the league campaign, the team played 22 matches, recording 7 victories, 8 draws, and 7 defeats. These results confirmed the solid level and consistency that the club had reached during that period.

On an individual level, striker Abdelkader Mazouz stood out as the team's top scorer in the league with 7 goals. His performances were crucial to the team's positive results and he played a key role in the attacking line.

In the North African Cup competition, USM Blida faced the Tunisian side Club Africain in a challenging match held at the Municipal Stadium in Algiers. Despite a strong performance, the team was eliminated after a narrow 3–2 defeat. The two goals for USM Blida in that match were scored by Maâmar Ousser and Abdelkader Mazouz.

The 1954–1955 season remains a bright chapter, marked by technical stability under coach Smaïl Khabatou and by outstanding results that strengthened the club's reputation as one of the leading teams of that era.

== Squad information ==
As of match played 8 May 1955.

| Name | Position | Date of Birth (Age) | Signed in | Signed from | Apps | Goals |
Goalkeepers
| Saïd Bayou | GK | | 1952 | MC Alger | 53 | 0 |
| Abderrahmane Outata | GK | | 1954 | US Ouest Mitidja | 11 | 0 |
| Mohamed Mokdad | GK | | 1953 | Reserve team | 6 | 0 |
| Ghimour | GK | | 1954 | Reserve team | 5 | 0 |
Defenders
| Belkacem Bouguerra | DF | | 1944 | Reserve team | +144 | 7 |
| Maâmar Ousser | DF | 7 February 1935 (aged 19) | 1953 | Reserve team | 59 | 4 |
| Smaïl Khabatou | DF | 8 September 1920 (aged 33) | 1953 | MC Alger | 50 | 5 |
| Zoubir Zouraghi | DF | 1 January 1934 (aged 20) | 1953 | Reserve team | 22 | 0 |
| Djilali Hasni | DF | | 1954 | FC Blida | 7 | 0 |
| Mustapha Tchaker | DF | 10 March 1936 (aged 19) | 1954 | Reserve team | 1 | 0 |
Midfielders
| Rachid Hadji | MF | 1 January 1931 (aged 23) | 1948 | Reserve team | 150 | 21 |
| Belkacem Chalane | MF | 1 January 1930 (aged 24) | 1949 | Reserve team | 98 | 12 |
| Braham Brakni | MF | 19 January 1931 (aged 23) | 1949 | Reserve team | 94 | 15 |
| Yahia Soum | MF | | 1948 | Reserve team | 55 | 2 |
Forward
| Abdelkader Mazouz | FW | 4 August 1932 (aged 22) | 1949 | Reserve team | 84 | 37 |
| Mokhtar Dahmane | FW | 27 December 1931 (aged 22) | 1951 | Reserve team | 69 | 13 |
| Mohamed Sebkhaoui | FW | 25 October 1935 (aged 18) | 1952 | Reserve team | 51 | 13 |
| Mustapha Begga | FW | 10 June 1934 (aged 20) | 1952 | Reserve team | 48 | 7 |
| Benyoucef Boumbadji | FW | | 1951 | Reserve team | 47 | 6 |
| Benaissa Bouak | FW | | 1954 | FC Blida | 19 | 5 |

== Pre-season and friendlies ==
| 2 September 1954 | OCB Oued Fodda | 1–2 | USM Blida | Oued Fodda |
| | Bernardi 12' | Report | Abdelkader Mazouz 28'; Braham Brakni 28' | Referee: M. |

| 5 September 1954 | USM Blida | 1–2 | AS Boufarik | Blida |
| | (?) Outata, Hasni (Zouraghi), Bouguerra, Begga, Brakni, Chalane, Mazouz, Bouak (Yahia), Dahmane, Sebkhaoui | Report | Navarro Valentin (?) Widenlocher, Massip, Reguieg (Jasseron), Navarro Antoine, Perez, Barka (Fuselier), Pons, Navarro Valentin, Reichert, Vomero (Benincasa), Rezzig (Guillbert) | Stadium: USB Stadium; Referee: M. |

| 7 September 1954 Achoura | AS Boufarik | 3–3 | USM Blida | Boufarik |
| 16:00 | Pons 21' (?); Navarro Valentin (?) Widenlocher, Massip (Perez), Colombier, Navarro Antoine, Barka, Fuselier, Guilbert, Pons, Navarro Valentin, Reichert, Rezzig | Report | Bouak 40'; Mazouz (?) Mokdad, Zouraghi, Khabatou, Dahmane, Brakni, Oukaci, Begga, Sebkhaoui, Mazouz, Bouak, Lekhal | Referee: M. |

| 12 September 1954 | USM Blida | 6–2 | Stade Guyotville | Blida |
| | Begga; Sebkhaoui; Mazouz Outata (Mokdad), Hasni, Bouguerra, Khabatou, Brakni, Chalane, Begga, Mazouz, Bouak, Dahmane, Sebkhaoui | Report | Cambresy 54'; Vitiello Abderaka, Salord, Lubrano, Tortosa, Cioffi, Addadi, Ferrer, Tempowski, Vitiello, Ballester, Cambresy | Stadium: USB Stadium; Referee: M. Giner |

| 10 April 1955 friendly | MO Béjaïa | 1–2 | USM Blida | Bougie |

| 11 April 1955 friendly | JS Djijel | 1–3 | USM Blida | Bougie |
| | Djemame 65' Keddam, Moussaoui, Lehtihet, Arada, Boudergui, Bounab, Chater, Aberkane, Djemame, Benkiniouar, Kihal | Report | ? 7'; Bouak 39'; Mazouz 52' Outata; Brakni, Zouraghi, Ousser; Chalane, Hadji; Bouguerra, Sebkhaoui, Bouak, Mazouz, Begga | Referee: M. Touti |

== Competitions ==
=== Overview ===
| Competition | Record | | | | | | | | Started round | Final position / round | First match | Last match |
| Competition | G | W | D | L | GF | GA | GD | Win % | Started round | Final position / round | First match | Last match |
|---|---|---|---|---|---|---|---|---|---|---|---|---|
| Division Honneur | 22 | 7 | 8 | 7 | 25 | 35 | −10 | 31.82 | —N/a | 6th | 19 September 1954 | 8 May 1955 |
| Forconi Cup | 3 | 3 | 0 | 0 | 11 | 2 | +9 | 100.00 | Fourth Round | Fifth Round | 24 October 1954 | 12 December 1954 |
| North African Cup | 1 | 0 | 0 | 1 | 2 | 3 | −1 | 0.00 | Round of 32 | Round of 32 | 2 January 1955 | 2 January 1955 |
| Coupe de France | 1 | 0 | 0 | 1 | 0 | 1 | −1 | 0.00 | First Round | First Round | 3 October 1954 | 3 October 1954 |
| Total | 27 | 10 | 8 | 9 | 38 | 41 | −3 | 37.04 | | | | |

=== Division Honneur ===
==== League table ====
| Pos | Team | Pld | W | D | L | GF | GA | GD | Pts | Qualification or relegation |
|---|---|---|---|---|---|---|---|---|---|---|
| 1 | GS Alger (C) | 22 | 15 | 5 | 2 | 40 | 20 | +20 | 57 | Qualified for North African Championship |
| 2 | MC Alger | 22 | 13 | 5 | 4 | 32 | 15 | +17 | 53 | |
| 3 | S.Guyotville | 22 | 13 | 4 | 5 | 42 | 28 | +14 | 52 | |
| 4 | AS Boufarik | 22 | 11 | 6 | 5 | 31 | 27 | +4 | 50 | |
| 5 | USM Blida | 22 | 7 | 8 | 7 | 27 | 35 | −8 | 44 | |
| 6 | SCU El Biar | 22 | 7 | 7 | 8 | 37 | 40 | −3 | 43 | |
| 7 | RS Alger | 22 | 6 | 7 | 9 | 31 | 43 | −12 | 41 | |
| 8 | AS Saint Eugène | 22 | 6 | 6 | 10 | 26 | 26 | 0 | 40 | |
| 9 | FC Blidéen | 22 | 7 | 4 | 11 | 24 | 30 | −6 | 40 | |
| 10 | O. Marengo | 22 | 6 | 4 | 12 | 32 | 42 | −10 | 38 | |
| 11 | ASPTT Alger | 22 | 4 | 5 | 13 | 22 | 40 | −18 | 35 | Relegated to 1955–56 Promotion Honor |
| 12 | O Hussein Dey | 22 | 5 | 3 | 14 | 24 | 35 | −11 | 35 | Relegated to 1955–56 Promotion Honor |

(C) Champions

==== Results by round ====
| Round | 1 | 2 | 3 | 4 | 5 | 6 | 7 | 8 | 9 | 10 | 11 | 12 | 13 | 14 | 15 | 16 | 17 | 18 | 19 | 20 | 21 | 22 |
|---|---|---|---|---|---|---|---|---|---|---|---|---|---|---|---|---|---|---|---|---|---|---|
| Ground | H | A | H | A | H | A | H | A | H | A | H | A | H | A | H | A | H | A | H | A | H | A |
| Result | W | L | L | D | W | W | L | L | D | D | W | D | L | L | W | L | D | D | W | D | D | W |
| Position | 3 | 6 | 7 | 9 | 6 | 4 | 7 | 7 | 7 | 8 | 7 | 7 | 7 | 7 | 7 | 7 | 7 | 7 | 6 | 6 | 5 | 5 |

Updated to match(es) played on 8 May 1955. Source: Competitive matches
A = Away; H = Home; W = Win; D = Draw; L = Loss

=== Matches ===
Win Draw Loss

| 19 September 1954 Round 1 | USM Blida | 2–1 | Olympique de Marengo | Blida |
| | Sebkhaoui 48'; Bouak Outata, Bouguerra, Khabatou, Zouraghi, Brakni, Chalane, Begga, Sebkhaoui, Mazouza, Bouak, Dahmane | Report | Miramond 1' Robert, Laget, Bussiere, Mougeot, Dreuil, Barbian, Longo, Tardieu, Miramond Gaston, Losa, Bessonne Charly | Stadium: USB Stadium; Attendance: 3.000; Referee: M. Vals |

| 26 September 1954 Round 2 | GS Alger | 1–0 | USM Blida | Belcourt |
| | Deleo 69' Fabiano, Ferrasse, Salva, Cerdan, Mercadal, Torres, Fortune Roger, Calmus, Gambarutti, Bagur Albert, Deleo | Report | Outata, Zouraghi, Khabatou, Yahia, Brakni, Chalane, Begga, Sebkhaoui, Mazouza, Bouak, Dahmane. | Stadium: Stade municipal Referee: M. |

| 10 October 1954 Round 3 | USM Blida | 1–2 | AS Boufarik | Blida |
| | Brakni Mokdad, Zouraghi, Khabatou, Bouguerra, Brakni, Chalane, Begga, Sebkhaoui, Bouak, Yahia, Dahmane. | Report | Navarro; Pons Widenlocher, Massip, Navarro A., Winum, Barka, Alain Fuselier, Vomero, Pons, Navarro V., Reichert, Guisbert | Stadium: USB Stadium; Referee: M. Chelah |

| 17 October 1954 Round 4 | ASPTT Alger | 0–0 | USM Blida | Algiers |
| | | | Outata; Ousser, Khabatou, Yahia, Brakni, Chalane, Begga, Sebkhaoui, Bouak, Hadji, Dahmane. | Referee: M. Giner |

| 31 October 1954 Round 5 | USM Blida | 3–1 | AS Saint-Eugène | Blida |
| | Brakni (?); Mazouz Guimour, Zouraghi, Khabatou, Yahia, Brakni, Chalane, Begga, Sebkhaoui, Mazouza, Ousser, Hadji. | Report | Baéza | Stadium: USB Stadium; Attendance: 3.000; Referee: M. Rivieccio |

| 14 November 1953 Round 6 | FC Blida | 1–3 | USM Blida | Blida |
| | Ross 46' | Report | Brakni 40' (pen.); Sebkhaoui 54'; Mazouza 72' Guimour, Zouraghi, Khabatou, Yahia, Brakni, Chalane, Begga, Sebkhaoui, Mazouza, Hadji, Bouak. | Stadium: FCB Stadium; Attendance: 3.000; Referee: M. Attanasio Jean |

| 21 November 1954 Round 7 | USM Blida | 0–2 | SCU El Biar | Blida |
| | Guimour, Khabatou, Yahia, Ousser, Chalane, Hadji, Sebkhaoui, Bouak, Mazouza, Tchaker, Dahmane. | Report | Falzon; Tchaker (o.g.) | Stadium: USB Stadium; Referee: M. Belkessa |

| 28 November 1954 Round 8 | RS Alger | 5–0 | USM Blida | Belcourt |
| | Zaibek 29'; Maouch 43', 64'; Llorens 69'; Magliozzi II 75' | Report | Guimour, Ousser, Khabatou, Yahia, Hasni, Hadji, Begga, Sebkhaoui, Mazouza, Dahmane, Bouak. | Stadium: Stade municipal Referee: M. Derradji |

| 5 December 1954 Round 9 | USM Blida | 0–0 | Stade Guyotville | Blida |
| | Bayou, Ousser, Khabatou, Zouraghi, Brakni, Chalane, Begga, Sebkhaoui, Mazouza, Yahia, Hadji. | Report | | Stadium: USB Stadium; Attendance: 2.300; Referee: M. Kerrachi |

| 19 December 1954 Round 10 | MC Alger | 1–1 | USM Blida | Saint Eugène |
| | Hahad 46' | Report | Abdelkader Mazouz 22' Bayou, Zouraghi, Khabatou, Hasni, Hadji, Dahmane, Begga, Sebkhaoui, Mazouza, Bouak, Boumbadji. | Stadium: Stade Communal de Saint Eugène; Attendance: 10.000; Referee: M. Mazzocchi |

| 9 January 1955* Round 11 | USM Blida | 3–2 | Olympique d'Hussein Dey | Blida |
| | Khabatou 14', 31'; Bouak 59' Bayou, Bouguerra, Ousser, Yahia, Hasni, Hadji, Bouak, Chalane, Khabatou, Dahmane, Sebkhaoui | Report | Perret 15'; Lefumat 50' | Stadium: USB Stadium; Attendance: 2.049; Referee: M. Calfoun |

| 16 January 1955 Round 12 | Olympique de Marengo | 2–2 | USM Blida | Marengo |
| | Zoubir 6', 55' | Report | Bouak 7', 24' Bayou, Bouguerra, Ousser, Yahia, Hadji, Hasni, Begga, Chalane, Khabatou, Dahmane, Bouak | Stadium: Stade communal de Marengo; Referee: M. |

| 30 January 1955 Round 13 | USM Blida | 2–3 | GS Alger | Blida |
| | Sebkhaoui; Khabatou Bayou, Bouguerra, Ousser, Hasni, Hadji, Chalane, Begga, Mazouz, Khabatou, Sebkhaoui, Dahmane | Report | Bagur; Ferrase; Deleo | Stadium: USB Stadium; Referee: M. Rivieccio |

| 13 February 1955 Round 14 | AS Boufarik | 3–1 | USM Blida | Boufarik |
| | Liort 52'; Navarro 61', 88' | Report | Hadji 61' Outata, Zouraghi, Ousser, Hasni, Hadji, Brakni, Begga, Sebkhaoui, Bouak, Dahmane, Boumbadji | Attendance: 2.900; Referee: M. J. Attanasio |

| 27 February 1955 Round 15 | USM Blida | 2–0 | ASPTT Alger | Blida |
| | Ousser 81'; Sebkhaoui 86' Bayou, Zouraghi, Khabatou, Bouguerra, Chalane, Brakni, Begga, Sebkhaoui, Bouak, Hadji, Ousser | Report | | Stadium: USB Stadium; Attendance: 1.300; Referee: M. Lapasset |

| 6 March 1955 Round 16 | AS Saint-Eugène | 2–0 | USM Blida | Saint Eugène |
| | Brouel 54'; Boret 60' | Report | Bayou, Zouraghi, Khabatou, Bouguerra, Brakni, Chalane, Sebkhaoui, Hasni, Bouak, Hadji, Dahmane | Stadium: Stade Communal de Saint Eugène; Referee: M. Salort |

| 13 March 1955 Round 17 | USM Blida | 0–0 | FC Blida | Blida |
| | Outata, Ousser, Yahia, Zouraghi, Hadji, Brakni, Sebkhaoui, Boumbadji, Mazouz, Begga, Dahmane | Report | Menacer, Giner, J-P Marchesano, Torres M, Sicart, Moreno, Ruiz, Espi, Riera, Camand, Ross | Stadium: USB Stadium; Attendance: 2.300; Referee: M. Janvier Attanasio |

| 27 March 1955 Round 18 | SCU El Biar | 1–1 | USM Blida | El Biar |
| | De Villeneuve | Report | Hadji Outata, Zouraghi, Khabatou, Ousser, Yahia, Hadji, Begga, Sebkhaoui, Mazouz, Dahmane, Boumbadji | Referee: M. |

| 3 April 1955 Round 19 | USM Blida | 2–1 | RS Alger | Blida |
| | Begga 13'; Bouak 88' Outata, Brakni, Ousser, Zouraghi, Hadji, Yahia, Sebkhaoui, Bouak, Mazouz, Begga, Dahmane | Report | Pons 27' | Stadium: FCB; Attendance: 1.600; Referee: M. Vals |

| 17 April 1955 Round 20 | Stade Guyotville | 0–0 | USM Blida | Guyotville |
| | | Report | Outata, Zouraghi, Brakni, Ousser, Hadji, Chalane, Begga, Sebkhaoui, Bouak, Mazouz, Bouguerra | Referee: M. |

| 24 April 1955 Round 21 | USM Blida | 0–0 | MC Alger | Blida |
| | Outata, Ousser, Brakni, Zouraghi, Chalane, Hadji, Khabatou, Bouak, Mazouz, Sebkhaoui, Begga | Report | | Stadium: USB Stadium; Referee: M. |

| 8 May 1955 Round 22 | Olympique d'Hussein Dey | 2–4 | USM Blida | Hussein Dey |
| | Lefumat 35'; Perret 59' (pen.) | Report | Khabatou 48'; Mazouz 50', 70', 75' Bayou, Zouraghi, Brakni, Ousser, Hadji, Chalane, Begga, Sebkhaoui, Khabatou, Bouak, Mazouz | Stadium: Stade Communal de Hussein Dey |

== Coupe de France ==
| 3 October 1954 Round 1 | FC Blida | 1–0 | USM Blida | Boufarik |
| 14:30 | Moréno 48' Menacer; Giner, Gasque, Espi, Torrès M., Sicard, Moréno, Camand, Ross, Ruiz, Cano. | Report | Mazouz (red card) Outata, Zouraghi, Khabatou, Bouguerra, Chalane, Brakni, Begga, Sebkhaoui, Mazouz, Bouak, Dahmane. | Stadium: Stade Maréchal-Foch; Attendance: 3.000; Referee: M. Kerrachi |

== Forconi Cup ==
| 24 October 1954 5th Round | AS Chemin de Fer d'Alger | 1–4 | USM Blida | Lavigerie |
| | Sirena, Guillot, Ferigno, Poizat, Salom, Giner II, Séguy, Bourouiba, Sanchez, Nebot, Giner I. | Report | Begga 13'; Sebkhaoui 33', 88'; Brakni 59' Outata, Yahia, Khabatou, Zouraghi; Brakni, Chalane; Begga, Sebkhaoui, Bouak, Hadji, Ousser. | Attendance: 1.500; Referee: M. Lapasset |

| 7 November 1954 6th Round | NA Hussein Dey | 0–5 | USM Blida | Boufarik |
| 14:30 | Bachet, Boudjema, Zermaoui, Adadi, Mahdi, Marouf, Tchikou, Adder, Zioui, Mirou, Tirarf | Report | Boudjemaâ (?); Mazouz; Sebkhaoui Guimour, Yahia, Khabatou, Zouraghi, Chalane, Brakni, Begga, Sebkhaoui, Mazouza, Hadji, Ousser | Stadium: Stade des Quinconces; Referee: M. Attanasio A. |

| 12 December 1954 7th Round | AS Saint-Eugène | 1–2 | USM Blida | Boufarik |
| | Zouba 47' Signès, Oliver, Bérenguer, Aboulker, Zouba, Bérah, Delmas, Boret, Pappalardo, Maouche, Buadès | Report | Hadji 55'; Mazouz 87' (pen.) Bayou, Zouraghi, Khabatou, Yahia, Hadji, Chalane, Begga, Sebkhaoui, Mazouza, Ousser, Boumbadji | Stadium: Stade des Quinconces; Attendance: 1.800; Referee: M. Rivieccio |

== North Africain Cup ==
| 2 January 1955 Round of 32 | USM Blida | 2–3 | Club Africain | Belcourt |
| | Ousser 54'; Mazouz 68' Bayou, Bouguerra, Zouraghi, Chalane, Khabatou, Hadji, Begga, Sebkhaoui, Mazouz, Ousser, Boumbadji | Report | Ridah 22', 27'; Bokri 55' Abdelli, Fellah, Bokri, Azzabi, Durin, Skander, Kebaili, Namri, Ridah, Bohini, Guidri | Stadium: Stade municipal Referee: M. Brenet |

=== Playing statistics ===
| Pos. | Name | Division Honneur | | | | | | | | | | | | | | | | | | | | | | FC | FC | | | NAF | Total |
| Pos. | Name | 1 | 2 | 3 | 4 | 5 | 6 | 7 | 8 | 9 | 10 | 11 | 12 | 13 | 14 | 15 | 16 | 17 | 18 | 19 | 20 | 21 | 22 | 1 | 1 | 2 | 3 | 1 | Total |
|---|---|---|---|---|---|---|---|---|---|---|---|---|---|---|---|---|---|---|---|---|---|---|---|---|---|---|---|---|---|
| GK | Outata | X | X | | X | | | | | | | | | | X | | | X | X | X | X | X | | X | X | | | | 11 |
| GK | Bayou | | | | | | | | | X | X | X | X | X | Injured | X | X | S | | | | | X | | | | X | X | 10 |
| GK | Ghimour | | | | | X | X | X | X | | | | | | | | | | | | | | | | | X | | | 5 |
| GK | Mokdad | | | X | | | | | | | | | | | | | | | | | | | | | | | | | 1 |
| DF | Khabatou | X | X | X | X | X | X | X | X | X | X | X | X | X | Injured | X | X | S | X | | | X | X | X | X | X | X | X | 23 |
| DF | Zouraghi | X | X | X | | X | X | | | X | X | | | | X | X | X | X | X | X | X | X | X | X | X | X | X | X | 21 |
| DF | Ousser | | | | X | X | | X | X | X | | X | X | X | X | X | S | X | X | X | X | X | X | | X | X | X | X | 20 |
| DF | Bouguerra | X | | X | | | | | | | | X | X | X | | X | X | S | | | X | | | X | | | | X | 10 |
| DF | Hasni | | | | | | | | X | | X | X | X | X | X | | X | | | | | | | | | | | | 7 |
| DF | Tchaker | | | | | | | X | | | | | | | | | | | | | | | | | | | | | 1 |
| MF | Hadji | | | | X | X | X | X | X | X | X | X | X | X | X | X | X | X | X | X | X | X | X | | X | X | X | X | 23 |
| MF | Chalane | X | X | X | X | X | X | X | | X | | X | X | X | | X | X | S | | | X | X | X | X | X | X | X | X | 21 |
| MF | Brakni | X | X | X | X | X | X | | | X | | | | | X | X | X | X | | X | X | X | X | X | X | X | | | 18 |
| MF | Soum | | X | X | X | X | X | X | X | X | | X | X | S | | | | X | X | X | | | | | X | X | X | | 16 |
| FW | Sebkhaoui | X | X | X | X | X | X | X | X | X | X | X | | X | X | X | X | X | X | X | X | X | X | X | X | X | X | X | 26 |
| FW | Begga | X | X | X | X | X | X | | X | X | X | | X | X | X | X | | X | X | X | X | X | X | X | X | X | X | X | 24 |
| FW | Mazouz | X | X | S | | X | X | X | X | X | X | | | X | S | | | X | X | X | X | X | X | X | | X | X | X | 19 |
| FW | Bouak | X | X | X | X | | X | X | X | | X | X | X | | X | X | X | S | | X | X | X | X | X | X | | | | 19 |
| FW | Dahmane | X | X | X | X | | | X | X | | X | X | X | X | X | | X | X | X | X | | | | X | | | | | 16 |
| FW | Boumbadji | | | | | | | | | | X | | | | X | | | X | X | | | | | | | | X | X | 6 |

=== Goalscorers ===
Includes all competitive matches. The list is sorted alphabetically by surname when total goals are equal.

| Nat. | Player | Pos. | DH | FC | NAC | TOTAL |
|---|---|---|---|---|---|---|
| (Algeria) | Abdelkader Mazouz | FW | 7 | 4 | 1 | 12 |
| (Algeria) | Mohamed Sebkhaoui | FW | 4 | 3 | 0 | 7 |
| (Algeria) | Benaissa Bouak | FW | 5 | 0 | 0 | 5 |
| (Algeria) | Smaïl Khabatou | DF | 4 | 0 | 0 | 4 |
| (Algeria) | Braham Brakni | FW | 3 | 1 | 0 | 4 |
| (Algeria) | Rachid Hadji | FW | 2 | 1 | 0 | 3 |
| (Algeria) | Mustapha Begga | FW | 1 | 1 | 0 | 2 |
| (Algeria) | Maâmar Ousser | DF | 1 | 0 | 1 | 2 |
| Own Goals | | | 0 | 1 | 0 | 1 |
| Totals | | | 27 | 11 | 2 | 40 |

== Transfers ==
La liste complète des mutations dans la ligue d'Alger (F.F.F.).

=== In ===
| Pos | Player | From club |
|---|---|---|
| DF | Smaïl Khabatou | MC Alger |
| | Abdelkader Azeghour | FC Blida |
| DF | Djilali Hasni | FC Blida |
| GK | Abderrahmane Outata | US Ouest Mitidja |
| | SNP Kaddour | US Ouest Mitidja |
| | Bouak Benaissa | FC Blida |
| | Mohamed Gherbi | SCM Blida |
| GK | Mohamed Mokdad | |
| GK | Benganif | |

=== Out ===
| Pos | Player | To club |
|---|---|---|
| | Mohamed Abidi | FC Blida |
| | Missoum Boukerrara | SCM Blida |
| | Abdelaziz Meradi | FC Blida |
| | Rabah Zerrouki | |
| | Ahmed Zouakou | SCM Blida |
| | Mohamed Boudjeltia | |
| | Mohamed Rezig | US Blida |
| | Mohamed Behlouli | USMB Reserve |
| | Ahmed Zahzah | Olympique de Marengo |
| | Kaddour Bensamet | Retired |
| | Sid Ali Mahieddine | Retired |
| | Ali Mansouri | Retired |
| | Mohamed Madoudou | MS Cherchell |
| | Echeikh | |
| | Raouti Bekhoucha | |
