= 1953–54 USM Blida season =

USM Blida
1953–54 season
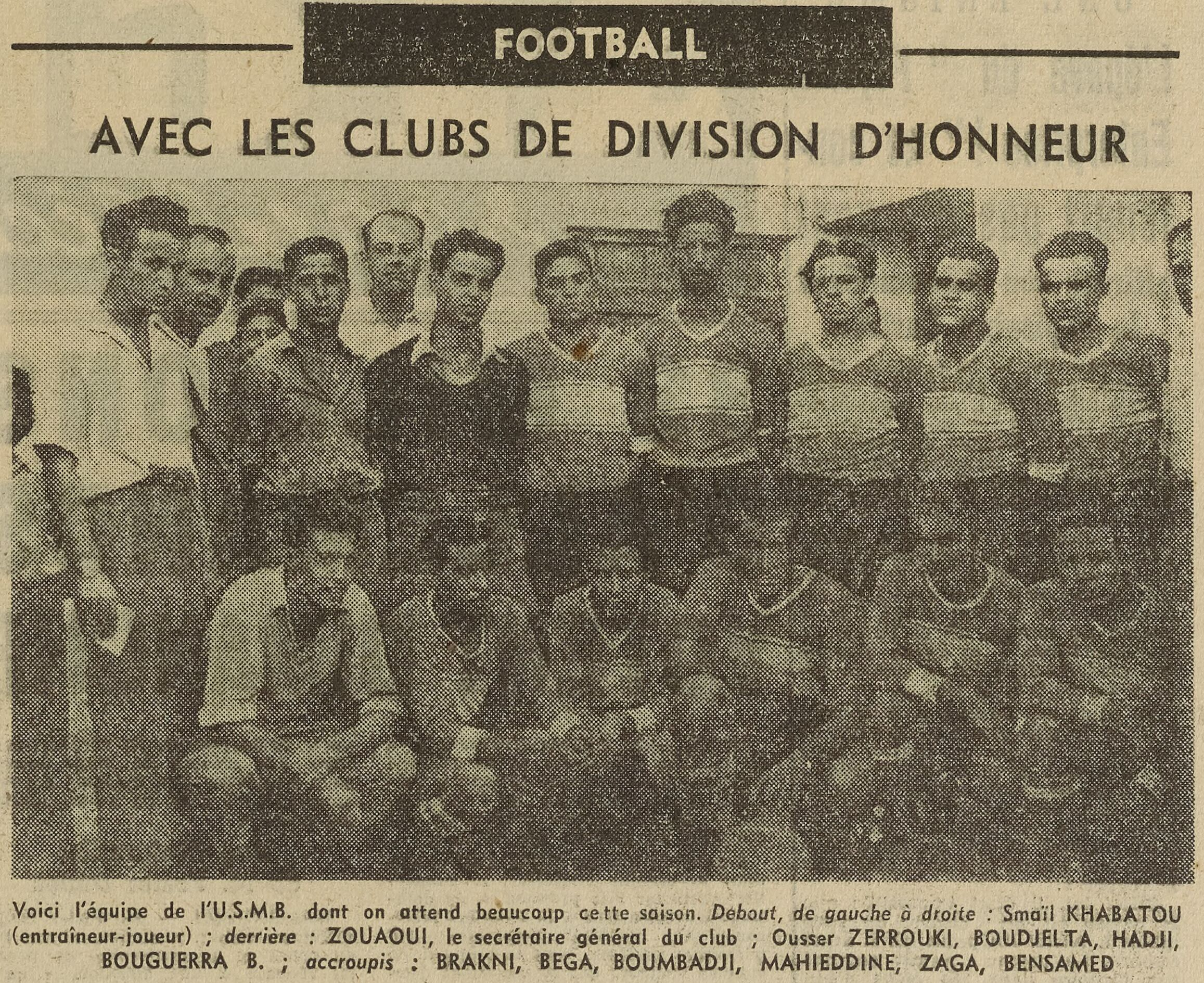
- President: Mustapha Hadji
- Head coach: Smaïl Khabatou
- Stadium: USB Stadium, Blida
- Division Honneur: 6th
- Forconi Cup: Fifth Round
- Top goalscorer: League: Abdelkader Mazouz (13); All: Abdelkader Mazouz (15)
Home colours

In the 1953–54 season, USM Blida competed in the Division Honneur for the 21st season French colonial era, as well as the Forconi Cup. They competed in Division Honneur, and the Forconi Cup.

== Pre-season and friendlies ==
7 June 1954	L'Entente de l'US Bougie-CS Bougie	2–2	USM Blida	Bougie
	Baaziz	Report	Mazouz ?	Referee: M.

13 June 1954 Tournoi de Saint-Eugène	USM Blida	3–0	NA Hussein Dey	Saint-Eugène
	Bouak 47'; Hadji 75' Mokdad, Zouraghi, Bouguerra, Hasni, Yahia, Zahzaz, Echeikh, Dahmane, Bouak, Hadji, Begga	Report	Ibrir, Boudjema, Zermani, Lardjane, Mokrane, Marouf, Tchikou, Khelifati, Mahdi, Zioui I, Zioui II	Stadium: Saint-Eugène Stadium; Referee: M.

30 August 1953	AS Boufarik	6–0	USM Blida	Boufarik
	Reichert 18', 76'; Dormoy 31'; Navarro 49', 59'; Olcina 62' Widenlocher (Dambrun), Massip, Reguieg, Vicédo (Siesse), Pérez (Said Ali), Barka Aissa, Voméro, Pons, Dormoy (Olcina), Reichert, Navarro V.	Report	Brakni (penalty missed) 60' Zouaoui, Bouguerra (Khabatou), Zerrouki, Ousser, Hadji, Boudjeltia (Yahia), Zahzah (Brakni), Dahmane (Brinis), Bensamed (Begga), Mahieddine, Boumbadji,	Referee: M. Chibane

6 September 1953	USM Blida	7–3	USM Marengo	Blida
16:30	Benyoucef Boumbadji; Sid Ali Mahieddine; Yahia Soum; Smaïl Khabatou; Mohamed Sebkhaoui	Report	Saâdoun; Ali	Stadium: Brakni Brothers Stadium

13 September 1953	Stade Guyotville	1–0	USM Blida	Guyotville
		Report

== Competitions ==
=== Overview ===
Competition	Record								Started round	Final position / round	First match	Last match
Competition	G	W	D	L	GF	GA	GD	Win %	Started round	Final position / round	First match	Last match
Division Honneur	22	7	7	8	38	33	+5	31.82	—N/a	6th	20 September 1953	2 May 1954
Forconi Cup	2	2	0	0	4	1	+3	100.00	Fourth Round	Fifth Round	8 November 1953	6 December 1953
North African Cup	5	3	1	1	6	3	+3	60.00	Round of 16	Semi-final	3 January 1954	3 April 1954
Total	29	12	8	9	48	37	+11	41.38				

=== Division Honneur ===
==== League table ====
Pos	Team	Pld	W	D	L	GF	GA	GD	Pts	Qualification or relegation
1	GS Alger (C)	22	14	3	5	42	16	+26	53	Qualified for North African Championship
2	MC Alger	22	11	8	3	33	22	+11	52	
3	AS Boufarik	22	11	7	4	48	32	+16	51	
4	FC Blidéen	22	9	10	3	45	28	+17	50	
5	O. Marengo	22	8	7	7	32	33	−1	45	
6	USM Blida	22	7	7	8	38	33	+5	43	
7	RS Alger	22	6	9	7	30	31	−1	43	
8	S.Guyotville	22	6	8	8	35	42	−7	42	
9	O Hussein Dey	22	6	7	9	33	40	−7	41	
10	AS Saint Eugène	22	4	8	10	27	39	−12	38	
11	RC Maison Carrée	22	4	6	12	24	46	−22	36	Relegated to 1954–55 Promotion Honor
12	GS Orléansville	22	2	8	12	18	40	−22	34	Relegated to 1954–55 Promotion Honor

Source: La Dépêche quotidienne d'Algérie
(C) Champions

==== Results by round ====
Round	1	2	3	4	5	6	7	8	9	10	11	12	13	14	15	16	17	18	19	20	21	22
Ground	H	A	A	H	A	H	A	H	A	H	A	A	H	H	A	H	A	H	A	H	A	H
Result	L	D	D	L	W	D	D	L	L	W	L	L	W	D	D	D	W	W	L	L	W	W
Position	9	9	8	9	9	9	9	9	9	10	10	11	10	10	10	10	9	7	8	9	8	6

Updated to match(es) played on 2 May 1954. Source: Competitive matches
A = Away; H = Home; W = Win; D = Draw; L = Loss

=== Matches ===
Win Draw Loss

20 September 1953 Round 1	USM Blida	0–1	GS Alger	Blida
16:00	Bayou, Bouguerra, Bekhoucha, Ousser, Khabatou, Hadji, Begga, Yahia, Mahieddine, Sebkhaoui, Boumbadji	Report	Déléo 40' Fabiano, Lapasset, Salva, Fortuné, Torrès, Gambarutti, Biton, Bagur, Cerdan, Azef, Déléo	Stadium: USB Stadium; Attendance: +4000; Referee: M. Rivieccio

27 September 1953 Round 2	MC Alger	0–0	USM Blida	Saint Eugène
	Mekirèche, Bouaichoune, Abdelaoui, Hamid, Zouraghi, Hamadi, Dahmoun, Lamrani, Gadi, Hahad, Guitoun	Report	Bayou, Ousser, Echeikh, Bouguerra, Yahia, Khabatou, Bensamet, Begga, Mahieddine, Sebkhaoui, Boumbadji	Stadium: Stade Communal de Saint Eugène; Referee: M. Attanacio Janvier

4 October 1953 Round 3	GS Orléansville	2–2	USM Blida	Orléansville
	Bensaid 36'; Mihoubi 67' Merle, Kanfar, Mellet, Maiza, Da Silva, Arroudj, Bensaid, Jelinek, Mihoubi, Daoud, Bertoli	Report	Kaddour Bensamet 4'; Sid Ali Mahieddine 6' Bayou, Ousser, Bouguerra, Zahzah, Khabatou, Bensamet, Begga, Yahia, Mahieddine, Sebkhaoui, Boumbadji	Stadium: Stade Joseph Robert; Referee: M. Belkessa

11 October 1953 Round 4	USM Blida	1–2	Olympique de Marengo	El Affroun
	Mustapha Begga 58' Bayou, Ousser, Khabatou, Bouguerra, Zahzah, Bekhoucha, Bensamet, Sebkhaoui, Mahieddine, Begga, Yahia	Report	Zoubir 53', 80' Roehring, Torrens (c), Mongeot, Dreuille, Lanata, Yantrène, Chatelaine, Zoubir, Miramond, Abdesselam, Loza	Stadium: Stade de l'USOM; Referee: M. Giner

18 October 1953 Round 5	Stade Guyotville	2–3	USM Blida	Guyotville
	Llorens 36', 86' Fayet, Lubrano, De Pasquale, Ballester V., Haddadi, Cioffi, Cambrésy, Vitiello, Ballester P, Llorens, Despax	Report	Mokhtar Dahmane 23', 74'; Belkacem Bouguerra 58' Bayou, Ousser, Khabatou, Bouguerra, Chalane, Zahzah, Bensamet, Begga, Mahieddine, Dahmane, Boumbadji	Referee: M. Lapasset

25 October 1953 Round 6	USM Blida	1–1	AS Saint Eugène	Guyotville
	Dahmane ou Begga 65'; Yahia (red card) 71' Bayou, Ousser, Khabatou, Yahia, Zahzah, Chalane, Sebkhaoui, Begga, Mahieddine, Dahmane, Bensamet	Report	Valenza ou Brouel 85'; Aouadj (red card) 71' Boubekeur, Oliver, Bérenguer, Aboulker, Berah, Valenza, Aouadj Mahieddine, Brouel, Rouet, Boret, Baesa	Referee: M. Fourrié

15 November 1953 Round 7	RS Alger	2–2	USM Blida	Belcourt
	Kouar 37', 45' Diehl, Pons, Mayans, Georges, Izzo, Magliozzi I, Maouch, Salem, Vermeuil, Magliozzi II, Kouar	Report	Rachid Hadji 48'; Ahmed Zahzah 53' Bayou, Madoudou, Khabatou, Bouguerra, Hadji, Chalane, Begga, Dahmane, Zahzah, Mahieddine, Ousser	Stadium: Stade municipal Referee: M. Rivieccio

22 November 1953 Round 8	USM Blida	0–2	FC Blida	Blida
	Bayou, Ousser, Khabatou, Bouguerra, Hadji, Chalane, Zahzah, Mazouz, Mahieddine, Begga, Sebkhaoui	Report	Moréno I Dahmane Meftah Moréno II, Giner, Gasque, Marchisano, Espi, Sicard, Camand, Ruiz, Moréno I, Meftah, Torrès	Stadium: USB Stadium; Attendance: 2.500; Referee: M. Diméglio

29 November 1953 Round 9	AS Boufarik	3–1	USM Blida	Boufarik
	Voméro 48'; Navarro V. 77'; Reichert 88' Videnlocher, Massip, Reguieg, Navarro A., Pérez, Barka, Voméro, Wiuum, Navarro V., Reichert, Llort	Report	Rachid Hadji 55' Mokdad, Ousser, Khabatou, Bouguerra, Yahia, Chalane, Zahzah, Hadji, Mazouz, Dahmane, Boumbadji	Referee: M. Belkessa

20 December 1953 Round 10	USM Blida	2–1	RC Maison-Carré	Blida
	Yahia Soum 20'; Mokhtar Dahmane 65' Bayou, Ousser, Khabatou, Mansouri, Chalane, Zahzah, Hadji, Brakni, Mazouz, Yahia, Dahmane	Report	Verdéal 50' Pujol, Marmu, Speltta, Kermiche, Mas, Cazalis, Mouliné, Montez, Canto R., Verdéal, Juanéda	Stadium: USB Stadium; Attendance: 2.800; Referee: M. Attanacio Janvier

27 December 1953 Round 11	Olympique d'Hussein Dey	2–0	USM Blida	Hussein Dey
	Ratajezack 18', 71' Erhard, Montovani, Belhamine, Vals, Perret, Scriba, Saidi, Serrano, Gomez, Lefumat, Ratajezack	Report	Bayou, Mansouri, Ousser, Chalane, Khabatou, Yahia, Dahmane, Hadji, Mazouz, Brakni, Zahzah	Stadium: Stade Communal de Hussein Dey; Attendance: 2.285; Referee: M. Rivieccio

21 February 1954* Round 12	GS Alger	2–1	USM Blida	Belcourt
	Fortuné 14', 17' Fabiano, Ferrasse, Salva, Cerdan, Mercadal, Gambrarutti, Fortuné, Bagur, Déléo, Calmus, Gay	Report	Mohamed Sebkhaoui 72' Bayou, Ousser, Khabatou, Bouguerra, Hadji, Chalane, Begga, Sebkhaoui, Mazouz, Brakni, Dahmane	Stadium: Stade municipal Attendance: 10.000; Referee: M. Attanasio Antoine

24 January 1954 Round 13	USM Blida	5–1	MC Alger	Blida
	Abdelkader Mazouz 7', 12', 19', 27', 57'; Chalane (red card) 85' Mokdad, Ousser, Bouguerra, Mansouri, Hadji, Chalane, Yahia, Mazouz, Mahieddine, Brakni, Boumbadji	Report	Deguigui 47'; Deguigui (red card) 85' Belkacem, Aftouche, Abdelaoui, Kouar Sid Ahmed, Benhamou Hamid, Deguigui, Hamadi, Guitoun, Berabah, Bouhired Mustapha, Hahad	Stadium: USB Stadium; Attendance: 3.000; Referee: M. Lapasset

31 January 1954 Round 14	USM Blida	0–0	GS Orléansville	Blida
	Bayou, Ousser, Mansouri, Bouguerra, Hadji, Khabatou, Begga, Mazouz, Mahieddine, Brakni, Boumbadji	Report	Merle, Aubert, Maiza, Bouzid, Da Silva, Khettib, Jelinek, Da Silva, Bertoli, Daoud	Stadium: USB Stadium; Attendance: 2.500; Referee: M. Attanasio Janvier

14 February 1954 Round 15	Olympique de Marengo	1–1	USM Blida	Marengo
	Loza 22' Robert, Mougeot, Dreuil, Laget, Babia, Yantrèn, Chatelaine, Abdesslem, Zoubir, Loza, Krutchy	Report	Abdelkader Mazouz 40' Bayou, Ousser, Khabatou, Yahia, Chalane, Hadji, Sebkhaoui, Zahzah, Mahieddine, Mazouz, Brakni	Stadium: Stade communal de Marengo; Referee: M.Fourié; Solvès, Hamlat

28 February 1954 Round 16	USM Blida	1–1	Stade Guyotville	Blida
	Ousser 70' Mokdad, Ousser, Khabatou, Bouguerra, Hadji, Chalane, Begga, Mazouz, Brakni, Sebkhaoui, Dahmane	Report	Llorens I 10' Faye, Ballester, Lubrano, Salort, de Pasquale, Ochoa, Camressy, Llorens I, Llorens II, Vitiello, Gélabert	Stadium: USB Stadium; Attendance: 3.000; Referee: M. Fourié

14 March 1954 Round 17	AS Saint-Eugène	0–2	USM Blida	Saint Eugène
	Boubekeur, Aboulker, Bérenguer, Oliver, Berah, Maouche, Aouadj, Lliader, Rouet, Boret, Baesa	Report	Abdelkader Mazouz 69'; Mustapha Begga 88' Bayou, Ousser, Khabatou, Bouguerra, Hadji, Chalane, Begga, Sebkhaoui, Mazouz, Brakni, Dahmane	Stadium: Stade Communal de Saint Eugène; Attendance: 5.400; Referee: M. Kerachi

21 March 1954 Round 18	USM Blida	4–2	RS Alger	Blida
	Mustapha Begga 25'; Abdelkader Mazouz 30', 65'; Mohamed Sebkhaoui 67' Bayou, Ousser, Khabatou, Bouguerra, Chalane, Hadji, Begga, Sebkhaoui, Mazouz, Brakni, Dahmane	Report	Mohamed Maouche 50'; Magliozzi II 80' Garcia, Senane, Magliozzi, Zaibeck, Vermeuil, Senane II, Maouch, Salem, Magliozzi II, Tailleu, Boutria	Stadium: USB Stadium; Attendance: 3.000; Referee: M. Lapasset

28 March 1954 Round 19	FC Blida	3–1	USM Blida	Blida
	Abderrahmane Meftah 34', 57'; Ruiz 72' Menacer, Sicard, Gasque, Riéra, Torrès, Espi, Moréno, Camand, Meftah, Riéra, Rahis	Report	Abdelkader Mazouz 30' Bayou, Ousser, Khabatou, Bouguerra, Hadji, Brakni, Begga, Sebkhaoui, Mazouz, Boumbadji, Dahmane	Stadium: FCB Stadium

11 April 1954 Round 20	USM Blida	1–3	AS Boufarik	Blida
	Massip (o.g.) Bayou, Ousser, Khabatou, Yahia, Chalane, Hadji, Brakni, Sebkhaoui, Mazouz, Boumbadji, Dahmane		Pons 30'; Voméro 73', 84' Widenlocher, Massip, Navarro Antoine, Barka, Mimoun, Pénez, Navarro Valenti, Pons, Llort, Benacaza, Voméro	Stadium: USB Stadium; Referee: M. Rivieccio

25 April 1954 Round 21	RC Maison-Carré	1–6	USM Blida	Maison-Carré
	Verdeal 80' Moraguès, Kabri, Marmu, Khermiche, Cazalis, Marcellin, Moulinié, Martin, Montès, Verdeal, Rahem	Report	Mokhtar Dahmane 27'; Mohamed Sebkhaoui 49'; Abdelkader Mazouz 70', 75'; Mokhtar Dahmane 82'; Mustapha Begga 89' Mokdad, Zouraghi, Ousser, Bouguerra, Chalane, Hadji, Begga, Sebkhaoui, Mazouz, Dahmane, Khabatou	Referee: M. Derradji

2 May 1954 Round 22	USM Blida	4–1	Olympique d'Hussein Dey	Blida
	Abdelkader Mazouz 46'; Mustapha Begga 50'; Mohamed Sebkhaoui 82'; Braham Brakni 84' Mokdad, Mansouri, Echikh, Bouguerra, Chalane, Hadji, Begga, Sebkhaoui, Mazouz, Brakni, Dahmane	Report	Hamoud Fez 25' Sanchez, Belamine, Vals, Serrano, Scriba, Ratajezak, Serrano II, Fez, Belhadj, Mascaro, Covès	Stadium: USB Stadium

== Forconi Cup ==
8 November 1953 Round	USM Blida	3–1	JSI Issers	Maison-Carré
	?' (o.g.); Bouguerra; Ousser Benganif, Ousser, Khabatou, Bouguerra, Zahzah, Chalane, Sebkhaoui, Begga, Mahieddine, Hadji, Dahmane	Report	Mokhtari Lascombe, Zurcher, Ferradji, Guettaf, Boussaid, Delpech, Abdelhak, Mokhtari, Personn, Rahem, Guilleminot	Referee: M. Mazzochi

6 December 1953 Round	USM Blida	1–0	Olympique Hussein Dey	El Biar
	Hadji 70' Bayou, Mansouri, Ousser, Chalane, Khabatou, Yahia, Zahzah,Hadji, Mazouz, Begga, Dahmane	Report	Erhard, Montovani, Vals, Scriba, Santiago, Perret, Gomez, Saidi, Zatelli, Lefumat, Bouami	Attendance: 2.000

== North Africain Cup ==
3 January 1954 Round of 32	ES Sahel	2–2	USM Blida	Tunis
	Mougou; Rachid 71' Douik,Lamti, Djerbi, Ben Sassi, Rachid, Mezaz, Khiari, Mougou, El Badji, Naidji	Report	Abdelkader Mazouz 25'; Smaïl Khabatou 73' Bayou, Ousser, Bouguerra, Mansouri, Hadji, Chalane, Bensamet, Mahieddine, Mazouz, Boumbadji, Khabatou	Stadium: Géo André; Attendance: 3.220; Referee: M. Chaby (Constantine)

17 January 1954 Round of 32 (R)	USM Blida	1–0	ES Sahel	Algiers
	Mouldi 6' (o.g.) Bayou, Ousser, Khabatou, Bouguerra, Hadji, Chalane, Yahia, Brakni, Dahmane, Sebkhaoui, Boumbadji	Report	Douik, Djerbi, Mouldi, Lamti, Chatali, Rachid, Naidji, Badji, Mougou I, Mougou II, Mezaz	Stadium: Municipal; Attendance: 6.000; Referee: M. Yacano (Constantine)

6 February 1954 Round of 16	USM Blida	2–0	EJ Philippeville	Algiers
14:30	Abdelkader Mazouz 71'; Ascencio 87' (o.g.) Bayou, Ousser, Mansouri, Bouguerra, Hadji, Chalane, Bensamet, Mazouz, Mahieddine, Brakni, Khabatou	Report	Lefafta, Stefanini, Ermécini, Ascencio, Guettaf, Guettaf II, Fani, Gedda, Conte, Buonacore, Cuomo	Stadium: Municipal; Attendance: 3.000; Referee: M. Habib (Tunisia)

6 March 1954 Quarter-finals	USM Blida	1–0	GC Oran	Algiers
	Mokhtar Dahmane 48' Bayou, Ousser, Khabatou, Bouguerra, Hadji, Chalane, Begga, Sebkhaoui, Mahieddine, Mazouz, Dahmane	Report	Gracia, Ramirez, Ariza, Urquijo, Escolano, Cuevas, Braum, Albert, Aliber, Garcia, Pamies	Stadium: Municipal; Attendance: 8.500; Referee: M. Boukili (Morocco)

3 April 1954 Semi-finals	USM Oran	1–0	USM Blida	Oran
	Nekkache 28' Bouameur Arroumia; Larbi Naier, Kouider Bendjahen, Lasni Mokhtar; Tahar Derrouis, Cheraka Cerra, Ghanem Soualmia, Lakhder Moussa, Omar Nekkache, Mohamed Benhamou (Fenoun), Benaouda Boudjellal (Tchengo)	Report	Bayou, Ousser, Khabatou, Bouguerra, Hadji, Chalane, Begga, Sebkhaoui, Mazouz, Brakni, Dahmane	Stadium: Vincent-Monréal; Attendance: 8.000; Referee: M. Belkouas (Tunisia)

== Squad information ==
Name	Position	Date of birth (age)	Signed in	Signed from	Apps	Goals
Goalkeepers
Saïd Bayou	GK		1952	MC Alger		
Mokdad	GK		1953	Reserve team		
Benganif	GK		1953	Reserve team		
Defenders
Maâmar Ousser	DF	7 February 1935 (aged 19)	1953	Reserve team		
Smaïl Khabatou	DF	8 September 1920 (aged 33)	1953	MC Alger		
Belkacem Bouguerra	DF		1944	Reserve team		
Ali Mansouri	DF	13 May 1918 (aged 36)	1938	AS Boufarik		
Bekhoucha	DF		1948	Reserve team		
Echeikh	DF		1952	Reserve team		
Zoubir Zouraghi	DF	1 January 1934 (aged 20)	1953	Reserve team		
Midfielders
Rachid Hadji	MF	1 January 1931 (aged 23)	1948	Reserve team		
Belkacem Chalane	MF	1 January 1930 (aged 24)	1949	Reserve team		
Yahia Soum	MF		1948	Reserve team		
Mohamed Madoudou	MF		1949	Reserve team		
Forwards
Abdelkader Mazouz	FW	4 August 1932 (aged 22)	1949	Reserve team		
Mustapha Begga	FW	10 June 1934 (aged 20)	1952	Reserve team		
Mohamed Sebkhaoui	FW	25 October 1935 (aged 18)	1952	Reserve team		
Mokhtar Dahmane	FW	27 December 1931 (aged 22)	1951	Reserve team		
Braham Brakni	FW	19 January 1931 (aged 23)	1949	Reserve team		
Sid Ali Mahieddine	FW		1948	Reserve team		
Ahmed Zahzah	FW	10 June 1934 (aged 20)	1951	Reserve team		
Benyoucef Boumbadji	FW		1951	Reserve team		
Kaddour Bensamet	FW		1944	Reserve team		

=== Playing statistics ===
Pos.	Name	Division Honneur																						FC		NAF					Total
Pos.	Name	1	2	3	4	5	6	7	8	9	10	11	12	13	14	15	16	17	18	19	20	21	22	1	2	1	2	3	4	5	Total
GK	Bayou	X	X	X	X	X	X	X	X		X	X	X		X	X		X	X	X	X				X	X	X	X	X	X	23
GK	Mokdad									X				X			X					X	X								5
GK	Benganif																							X							1
DF	Ousser	X	X	X	X	X	X	X	X	X	X	X	X	X	X	X	X	X	X	X	X	X		X	X	X	X	X	X	X	28
DF	Khabatou	X	X	X	X	X	X	X	X	X	X	X	X		X	X	X	X	X	X	X	X		X	X	X	X	X	X	X	27
DF	Bouguerra	X	X	X	X	X		X	X	X	Suspended		X	X	X		X	X	X	X		X	X	X		X	X	X	X	X	23
DF	Mansouri										X	X		X	X								X		X	X		X			8
DF	Bekhoucha	X			X	SS																									2
DF	Echeikh		X																				X								2
DF	Zouraghi																					X									1
MF	Hadji	X	Suspended					X	X	X	X	X	X	X	X	X	X	X	X	X	X	X	X	X	X	X	X	X	X	X	24
MF	Chalane					X	X	X	X	X	X	X	X	X	SS	X	X	X	X		X	X	X	X	X	X	X	X	X	X	23
MF	Yahia	X	X	X	X		X	Suspended		X	X	X		X		X					X				X		X				13
MF	Madoudou							X																							1
FW	Mazouz								X	X	X	X	X	X	X	X	X	X	X	X	X	X	X		X	X		X	X	X	20
FW	Begga	X	X	X	X	X	X	X	X				X		X		X	X	X	X		X	X	X	X				X	X	20
FW	Sebkhaoui	X	X	X	X		X		X				X			X	X	X	X	X	X	X	X	X			X		X	X	19
FW	Dahmane					X	X	X		X	X	X	X				X	X	X	X	X	X	X	X	X		X		X	X	19
FW	Brakni	Injured									X	X	X	X	X	X	X	X	X	X	X		X				X	X		X	15
FW	Mahieddine	X	X	X	X	X	X	X	X					X	X	X								X		X		X	X		15
FW	Zahzah			X	X	X	X	X	X	X	X	X				X								X	X						12
FW	Boumbadji	X	X	X		X				X	Suspended			X	X					X	X					X	X				11
FW	Bensamet		X	X	X	X	X																			X		X			7

=== Goalscorers ===

USM Blida 1953-1954

Includes all competitive matches. The list is sorted alphabetically by surname when total goals are equal.

Nat.	Player	Pos.	DH	FC	NAC	TOTAL
(Algeria)	Abdelkader Mazouz	FW	13	0	2	15
(Algeria)	Mokhtar Dahmane	FW	6	0	1	7
(Algeria)	Mustapha Begga	FW	5	0	0	5
(Algeria)	Mohamed Sebkhaoui	FW	4	0	0	4
(Algeria)	Rachid Hadji	FW	2	1	0	3
(Algeria)	Belkacem Bouguerra	FW	1	1	0	2
(Algeria)	Maâmar Ousser	DF	1	1	0	2
(Algeria)	Ahmed Zahzah	FW	1	0	0	1
(Algeria)	Sid Ali Mahieddine	FW	1	0	0	1
(Algeria)	Yahia Soum	FW	1	0	0	1
(Algeria)	Kaddour Bensamet	FW	1	0	0	1
(Algeria)	Braham Brakni	FW	1	0	0	1
(Algeria)	Smaïl Khabatou	DF	0	0	1	1
Own Goals			1	1	2	4
Totals			38	4	6	48

== Transfers ==
La liste complète des mutations dans la ligue d'Alger (F.F.F.).

=== In ===
Pos	Player	From club
DF	Smaïl Khabatou	MC Alger
	Abdelkader Azeghour	FC Blida
DF	Djilali Hasni	FC Blida
GK	Abderrahmane Outata	US Ouest Mitidja
	SNP Kaddour	US Ouest Mitidja
	Bouak Benaissa	FC Blida
	Mohamed Gherbi	SCM Blida
GK	Mokdad	
GK	Benganif	

=== Out ===
Pos	Player	To club
	Mohamed Abidi	FC Blida
	Missoum Boukerrara	SCM Blida
	Abdelaziz Meradi	FC Blida
	Rabah Zerrouki	
	Ahmed Zouakou	SCM Blida
	Mohamed Boudjeltia	
	Mohamed Rezig	US Blida
	Bahlouli	
