= Ahmed Zahzah =

Algerian footballer (1934–2025)

Personal information
- Date of birth: 10 June 1934
- Place of birth: Blida, French Algeria
- Date of death: 1 July 2025 (aged 91)
- Place of death: Blida, Algeria
- Position: Defender

Youth career
- 1947–1951: USM Blida

Senior career*
Years	Team	Apps	(Gls)
1951–1956	USM Blida		
1962–1967	USM Blida		
1968–1969	USM Blida		

International career
1957–1962	FLN football team		

Managerial career
- 1969–1970: ES Berrouaghia
- 1970–1977: JLC Douera
- 1982–1985: JLC Douera
- 1989–1991: JLC Douera
- 1993–1994: USM Blida
- * Club domestic league appearances and goals

Ahmed Zahzah (10 June 1934 – 1 July 2025) was an Algerian professional footballer who played as a defender.

Zahzah died on 1 July 2025, aged 91.

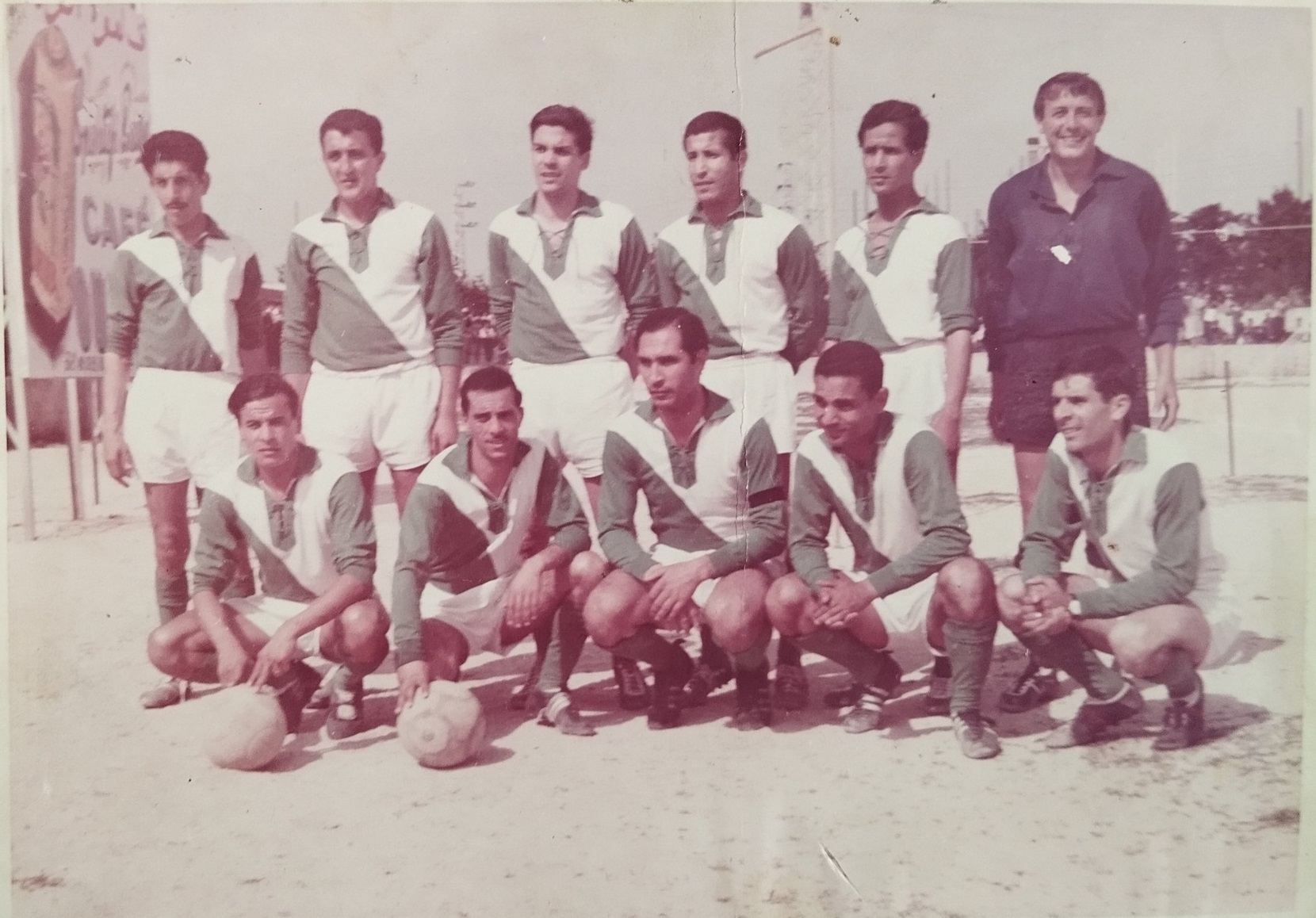
1963–1964

== Career statistics ==
Appearances and goals by club, season and competition
Club	Season	League			Cup		Total	
Club	Season	Division	Apps	Goals	Apps	Goals	Apps	Goals
USM Blida	1951–52	Division d'Honneur	3	0			3	0
USM Blida	1952–53	Division d'Honneur	1	0			1	0
USM Blida	1953–54	Division d'Honneur	10	1	2	0	12	1
USM Blida	1954–55	Division d'Honneur						
USM Blida	1955–56	Division d'Honneur						
USM Blida	1962–63	Critériums d'Honneur						
USM Blida	1963–64	Division d'Honneur						
USM Blida	1964–65	Nationale I						
USM Blida	1965–66	Nationale I						
USM Blida	Total							
Career total								
