= 1955–56 USM Blida season =

USM Blida
1955–56 season
- President: Mustapha Hadji
- Head coach: Smaïl Khabatou
- Stadium: FCB Stadium, Blida
- Division Honneur: 5th / 12
- Forconi Cup: Fifth round

In the 1955–56 season, USM Blida competed in the Division Honneur for the 23rd season French colonial era, as well as the Forconi Cup. They competed in Division Honneur, and the Forconi Cup.

== Review ==
The 1955–1956 season represents a significant historical milestone in the history of USM Blida, as it was the last season in which the club participated before withdrawing from official competitions. The team competed in the league until the fifteenth round, which took place on March 11, 1956.

In the league competition, USM Blida delivered a solid performance, playing fifteen matches in total. The team achieved seven victories, three draws, and suffered five defeats, a record that reflected its strength and competitive spirit despite the difficulties surrounding it. During this season, two players stood out as the team’s top scorers: Abdelkader Maazouz and Mohamed Sebkhaoui, each scoring seven goals and playing a key role in the squad’s success.

In the cup competition, USM Blida continued its strong performances by securing two important victories against USM Hadjout and USM Ouest Mitidja. These wins allowed the team to qualify for the North African Cup match. In that encounter, USM Blida faced GC Mascara but was defeated by four goals to one, with the team’s only goal scored by its leading striker, Abdelkader Maazouz.

Although the season could not be completed due to the club’s withdrawal, what USM Blida achieved during the 1955–1956 season remains a notable chapter in its history, illustrating the club’s heritage and the fighting spirit of its players and supporters during that period.

== Squad list ==
As of match played 11 March 1956.

Name	Position	Date of Birth (Age)	Signed in	Signed from	Apps	Goals
Goalkeepers
Saïd Bayou	GK		1952	MC Alger	63	0
Abderrahmane Outata	GK		1954	US Ouest Mitidja	20	0
Bensafar	GK		1955	Reserve team	1	0
Defenders
Maâmar Ousser	DF	7 February 1935 (aged 20)	1953	Reserve team	78	4
Smaïl Khabatou	DF	8 September 1920 (aged 34)	1953	MC Alger	67	6
Zoubir Zouraghi	DF	1 January 1934 (aged 21)	1953	Reserve team	40	0
Mustapha Tchaker	DF	10 March 1936 (aged 19)	1954	Reserve team	10	0
Djilali Hasni	DF		1954	FC Blida	10	0
Midfielders
Rachid Hadji	MF	1 January 1931 (aged 24)	1948	Reserve team	170	23
Belkacem Chalane	MF	1 January 1930 (aged 25)	1949	Reserve team	114	13
Braham Brakni	MF	19 January 1931 (aged 24)	1949	Reserve team	110	16
Yahia Soum	MF		1948	Reserve team	56	2
Forwards
Abdelkader Mazouz	FW	4 August 1932 (aged 23)	1949	Reserve team	99	44
Mustapha Begga	FW	10 June 1934 (aged 21)	1952	Reserve team	52	7
Mohamed Sebkhaoui	FW	25 October 1935 (aged 19)	1952	Reserve team	70	20
Mokhtar Dahmane	FW	27 December 1931 (aged 23)	1951	Reserve team	86	15
Benyoucef Boumbadji	FW		1951	Reserve team	56	9
Benaissa Bouak	FW		1954	Reserve team	35	10

== Pre-season and friendlies ==
28 August 1955	Olympique Hussein Dey	3–3	USM Blida	Hussein Dey
	Zborazski

29 August 1955 Achoura	USM Blida	5–3	USM El Harrach	Blida
	Sebkhaoui; Begga; Chalane; Hadji Outata, Zouraghi, Ousser, Tchaker (Daidi), Zidoun, Hasni, Begga, Hadji, Khabatou, Sebkhaoui, Chalane.	Report	Ferrari; Hamza Abdelgherfi (Gaceb), Laidani, Zeghroun, Lamari (Hazi), Aouara, Lahcene, (Koual), Ferrari, Hamza, Soudi, Boussadi, Menaoud.	Stadium: USB Stadium; Referee: M. Chekaimi Abdelaziz

11 September 1955	USM Blida	2–2	JS El Biar	Blida
	Bouak; Boumbadji (.) Bayou, Zouraghi, Brakni, Bouguerra, Zidoun, Hadji, Begga, Dahmane, Bouak, Boumbadji, Khabatou.	Report	Chicha; Kaci Gharbi, Azni I, Beztout, Ibrir, Rabah, Zeggane, Kerbache, Soukane I, Chicha (Kaci), Soukane II, Azni II.	Stadium: USB Stadium

== Competitions ==
=== Overview ===
Competition	Record								Started round	Final position / round	First match	Last match
Competition	G	W	D	L	GF	GA	GD	Win %	Started round	Final position / round	First match	Last match
Division Honneur	15	7	3	5	31	22	+9	46.67	—N/a	12th	18 September 1955	11 March 1956
Forconi Cup	2	2	0	0	5	2	+3	100.00	Fourth Round	Fifth Round	6 November 1955	4 December 1955
Coupe de France	2	1	0	1	2	5	−3	50.00	First Round	Second Round	25 September 1955	9 October 1955
North African Cup	1	0	0	1	1	4	−3	0.00	Round of 32	Round of 32	21 January 1956	21 January 1956
Total	20	10	3	7	39	33	+6	50.00				

=== Division Honneur ===
==== League table ====
Pos	Team	Pld	W	D	L	GF	GA	GD	Pts	Qualification or relegation
1	GS Alger (C)	15	9	4	2	27	15	+12	37	Qualified for North African Championship
2	AS Saint Eugène	15	8	4	3	23	19	+4	35	
3	GS Orléansville	15	8	4	3	30	14	+16	35	
4	AS Boufarik	15	8	3	4	31	22	+9	34	
5	USM Blida	15	7	3	5	30	21	+9	32	
6	MC Alger	15	6	5	4	26	17	+9	32	
7	SCU El-Biar	15	7	3	5	23	23	0	32	
8	S.Guyotville	15	6	3	6	26	29	−3	30	
9	FC Blidéen	15	3	5	7	13	23	−10	26	
10	O. Marengo	15	4	1	10	15	30	−15	24	
11	RU Alger	15	3	3	9	14	28	−14	23 (Note: 1 point deducted?)	Relegated to 1956–57 Promotion Honor
12	RS Alger	13	1	3	9	12	29	−17	18	Relegated to 1956–57 Promotion Honor

(C) Champions

==== Results by round ====
Round	1	2	3	4	5	6	7	8	9	10	11	12	13	14	15	16	17	18	19	20	21	22
Ground	H	A	A	H	A	H	A	H	A	H	A	A	H	H	A	H	A	H	A	H	A	H
Result	W	L	L	W	L	W	W	D	D	L	L	D	W	W	W	L	L	L	L	L	L	L
Position	2	5	7	6	6	6	5	5	5	6	8	8	7	6	5							

Updated to match(es) played on 11 March 1956. Source: Competitive matches
A = Away; H = Home; W = Win; D = Draw; L = Loss

=== Matches ===
Win Draw Loss

18 September 1955 Round 1	USM Blida	5–1	AS Saint-Eugène	Blida
	Mazouz 15', 89'; Bouak 18', 88'; Boumbadji 28' Outata, Zouraghi, Ousser, Brakni, Chalane, Hadji, Begga, Mazouza, Bouak, Sebkhaoui, Boumbadji	Report ·	Yahiaoui 28' Pujol, Errera, Brotons, Oliver, Donato, Yahiaoui, Buades, Serrano, Haeg, Achouche, Bouchache	Stadium: Stade de l'U.S.B; Attendance: 2.200; Referee: M. Kerachi

2 October 1955 Round 2	GS Orléansville	2–0	USM Blida	Orléansville
	Bernabeu 63'; Bertoli 72' Merle, Kanfar, Da Silva, Driss, Guichard, Daoud, Ferdji, Bouzid, Bertoli, Bernabeu, Fanals		Outata, Zouraghi, Brakni, Ousser, Hadji, Chalane, Begga, Bouak, Mazouza, Sebkhaoui, Dahmane

16 October 1955 Round 3	RU Alger	1–0	USM Blida	Algiers
	Carlotti 65' Juaneda, Rocher, Loti, Bouvier, Daube, Friand, Constantin, Mekhalfa, Coll, Carlotti, Tartevet		Outata, Zouraghi, Khabatou, Ousser, Brakni, Chalane, Hadji, Begga, Mazouza, Bouak, Dahmane	Stadium: Municipal

30 October 1955 Round 4	USM Blida	1–0	RS Alger	Blida
	Hadji 22' Bayou, Zouraghi, Khabatou, Ousser, Hadji, Hasni, Bouak, Sebkhaoui, Mazouz, Brakni, Chalane		Diehl, Flozas, Pons, Zaibeck, Mayans, Magliozzi, Maouch, Botella, Arguimbaud, Magliozzi, Novaoki	Stadium: Stade de l'U.S.B; Attendance: 1.300

13 November 1955 Round 5	Stade Guyotville	3–0	USM Blida	Guyotville
	Atzei 30'; Zouraghi 34' (o.g.); Llorens 39' Fayer, De Pasquale, Tortosa, Cioffi, Bout, Haddadi, Tempowsky, Grenier, Vitiello, Llorens, Atzei		Outata, Zouraghi, Ousser, Khabatou, Brakni, Soum Yahia, Sebkhaoui, Hadji, Bouak, Dahmane, Chalane	Referee: M. J. Attanasio

20 November 1955 Round 6	USM Blida	3–2	MC Alger	Blida
	Khabatou 23'; Bouak 65'; Sebkhaoui 80' Outata, Ousser, Zouraghi, Tchaker, Brakni, Dahmane, Boumbadji, Sebkhaoui, Bouak, Khabatou		Haffar 37'; Ouargli 90' Karoubi, Aftouche, Bourkika, Chaib, Ferhani, Hamid, Ouergli, Dahmoune, Hamadi, Haffar, Hahad	Stadium: Stade de l'U.S.B; Attendance: 2.500; Referee: M. Lapasset

27 November 1955 Round 4 (R)	USM Blida	2–1	RS Alger	Blida
	Sebkhaoui 27'; Tailleu 72' (o.g.) Outata, Zouraghi, Ousser, Brakni, Hasni, Tchaker, Chalane, Hadji, Khabatou, Sebkhaoui, Dahmane	Report	Ponsetti 76' Diehl, Flexas, Zaibeck, Magliozzi, Tailleu, Senane, Maouch, Botella, Ponsetti, Arguimbault, Magliozzi, Rables	Stadium: Stade de l'U.S.B; Referee: M. Khelifi

11 December 1955 Round 7	Olympique Marengo	0–3	USM Blida	Marengo
	Bastien, Mougeot, Bessone, Torrens, Zahzah, Tardieu, Vidal, Zoubir, Lanata, Loza		Mazouz 25'; Sebkhaoui 49', 68' Bayou, Zouraghi, Ousser, Tchaker; Hadji, Chalane; Khabatou, Sebkhaoui, Mazouz, Dahmane, Bouak

8 January 1956 Round 8	USM Blida	0–0	FC Blida	Blida
				Stadium: Stade de l'U.S.B

15 January 1956 Round 9	SCU El-Biar	1–1	USM Blida	El Biar
	Galéra 49' Benoit, Vidal, Forgue, Bruno, Issad, Baroni, Galéra, Buffard, Bouachiour, Florit, de Villaneuve		Abdelkader Mazouz 65' Ben Safar, Zouraghi, Brakni, Ousser, Hadji, Chalane, Mazouza, Sebkhaoui, Khabatou, Dahmane, Boumbadji	Referee: M. Belkessa

22 January 1956 Round 10	USM Blida	0–1	GS Alger	Blida
	Bayou, Hasni, Tchaker, Khabatou, Chalane, Hadji, Sebkhaoui, Dahmane, Bouak, Boumbadji, Mazouz		Calmus 57' Marco, Cerdan, El Kaim, Salva, Torrès, Bagur, Serrano V., Calmus, Serrano J., Fortuné, Ferrari	Stadium: Stade de l'U.S.B; Attendance: 4.000; Referee: M. Riveccio

29 January 1956 Round 11	AS Boufarik	5–3	USM Blida	Boufarik

12 February 1956 Round 12	AS Saint-Eugène	1–1	USM Blida	Algiers

26 February 1956 Round 13	USM Blida	5–3	GS Orléansville	Blida
	Mazouz 5'; Brakni 17'; Hadji 35'; Dahmane 50'; Sebkhaoui 82' Bayou, Hasni, Khabatou, Ousser, Brakni, Tchaker, Bouak, Hadji, Mazouz, Sebkhaoui, Dahmane		Bertoli 65'; Ousser 70' (o.g.); Braun 85' Merle, Maiza, Driss, Khanfar, Braun, Daoud, Bertoli, Fanals, Bontron, Bouzid, Guichard	Stadium: Stade de l'U.S.B; Attendance: 2.000; Referee: M. Cals

4 March 1956 Round 14	USM Blida	3–0	RU Alger	Blida
	Bayou, Khabatou, Ousser, Chalane, Brakni, Zoubir Zouraghi, Bouak, Hadji, Mazouz, Sebkhaoui, Dahmane			Stadium: Stade de l'U.S.B

11 March 1956 Round 15	RS Alger	1–5	USM Blida	Algiers
			Dahmane; Mazouz; Sebkhaoui; Hadji Bayou, Zoubir Zouraghi, Khabatou, Ousser, Chalane, Tchaker, Bouak, Hadji, Mazouz, Sebkhaoui, Dahmane	Stadium: Stade Municipal; Referee: M. Khelifi

25 March 1956 Round 16	USM Blida	w/o	Stade Guyotville	Blida
				Stadium: Stade de l'U.S.B

1 April 1956 Round 17	MC Alger	w/o	USM Blida	Algiers

15 April 1956 Round 18	USM Blida	w/o	Olympique Marengo	Blida
				Stadium: Stade de l'U.S.B

22 April 1956 Round 19	FC Blida	w/o	USM Blida	Blida
				Stadium: Stade de l'U.S.B

29 April 1956 Round 20	USM Blida	w/o	SCU El-Biar	Blida
				Stadium: Stade de l'U.S.B

6 May 1956 Round 21	GS Alger	w/o	USM Blida	Algiers

20 May 1956 Round 22	USM Blida	w/o	AS Boufarik	Blida
				Stadium: Stade de l'U.S.B

== Coupe de France ==
25 September 1955 Round 1	USM Blida	2–1 (a.e.t.)	Olympique de Marengo	Algiers
14:30	Boumbadji 92'; Bouak 102' Outata, Zouraghi, Brakni, Ousser, Hadji, Chalane, Begga, Mazouz, Bouak, Sebkhaoui, Boumbadji	Report	Mongeot 115' Zouaoui, Torrens, Bessone, Mougeot, Jerome, Langon, William, Vidal, Zoubir, Begondini, Loga	Stadium: Municipal

9 October 1955 Round 2	AS Saint Eugène	4–0	USM Blida	Boufarik
14:30	Matiben 54'; Bouchache II; Pappalardo 70'; Buades 75' Pujol, Brotons, Jurilli, Herrara, Zouba, Serrano, Buades, Matiben, Pappalardo, Bouchach II, Bouchache I	Report	Bayou, Zouraghi, Brakni, Ousser, Chalane, Khabatou, Bouak, Hadji, Mazouz, Sebkhaoui, Boumbadji

== Forconi Cup ==
6 November 1955 4th	USM Marengo	1–3	USM Blida	Mouzaiaville
14:15	85' Seddik, Djelfi, Saadi, Messaoud, Boukhalfa, Ferhat, Guendouz, Kebiche, Esaheli, Boualem, Saidel		Chalane 34'; Bouak 40'; Sebkhaoui 65' Bayou, Khabatou, Ousser, Zouraghi, Hadji, Brakni, Chalane, Sebkhaoui, Bouak, Dahmane, Boumbadji	Referee: M. Kerachi

4 December 1955 5th	US Ouest Mitidja	1–2 (a.e.t.)	USM Blida	Boufarik
	Bernardi 35' Berenguer, Achour, Andrada, Surzur, Rebbouh, Conquet, Belgoder, Bernardi, Alzina, Talbi, Battiat		Sebkhaoui 15'; Boumbadji 115' Outata, Zouraghi, Ousser, Tchaker; Chalane, Hadji; Bouak, Sebkhaoui, Dahmane, Khabatou, Boumbadji	Attendance: 1.500; Referee: M. Rivieccio

== North African Cup ==
21 January 1956 Round of 32	GC Mascara	4–1	USM Blida	Oran
14:00	Bahloul 14'; Bacoco 25'; Betsani 28'; Moumen 88' Abbès, Khemliche, Khiri, Baghdad, Sadek, Boutami, Mahi, Benmelouka, Bahloul, Moumen, Bekouche	Report	Abdelkader Mazouz 44' Outata, Zouraghi, Ousser, Brakni, Chalane, Hadji, Khabatou, Sebkhaoui, Mazouz, Dahmane, Boumbadji	Stadium: Vincent Monréal; Referee: Tunisia Bahri

== Squad information ==
=== Playing statistics ===
Pos.	Name	Division Honneur																						FC		FC		NAF	Total
Pos.	Name	1	2	3	4	5	6	7	8	9	10	11	12	13	14	15	16	17	18	19	20	21	22	1	2	1	2	1	Total
GK	Outata	X	X	X	X	X	X																	X			X	X	9
GK	Bayou							X			X			X	X	X									X	X			7
GK	Bensafar									X																			1
DF	Ousser	X	X	X	X	X	X	X		X				X	X	X								X	X	X	X	X	16
DF	Zouraghi	X	X	X	X	X	X	X		X					X	X								X	X	X	X	X	15
DF	Brakni	X	X	X	X	X	X			X				X	X									X	X	X		X	13
DF	Khabatou			X	X	X	X	X		X	X			X	X	X									X	X		X	13
DF	Tchaker				X		X	X	S		X			X		X											X		7
DF	Hasni				X		X				X			X															4
MF	Hadji	X	X	X	X	X		X		X	X			X	X	X								X	X	X	X	X	16
MF	Chalane	X	X	X	X	X		X		X	X				X	X								X	X	X	X	X	15
MF	Yahia					X																							1
FW	Sebkhaoui	X	X		X	X	X	X		X	X			X	X	X								X	X	X	X	X	16
FW	Bouak	X	X	X		X	X	X			X			X	X	X								X	X	X	X		14
FW	Dahmane		X	X	X	X	X	X		X	X			X	X	X										X	X	X	14
FW	Mazouz	X	X	X				X		X	X			X	X	X								X	X			X	12
FW	Boumbadji	X					X			X	X													X	X	X	X	X	9
FW	Begga	X	X	X																				X					4

=== Goalscorers ===

USM Blida 1955-1956

Includes all competitive matches. The list is sorted alphabetically by surname when total goals are equal.

Nat.	Player	Pos.	DH	FC	FC	NAC	TOTAL
(Algeria)	Mohamed Sebkhaoui	FW	6	2	0	0	8
(Algeria)	Abdelkader Mazouz	FW	6	0	0	1	7
(Algeria)	Benaissa Bouak	FW	3	1	1	0	5
(Algeria)	Rachid Hadji	FW	4	0	0	0	4
(Algeria)	Benyoucef Boumbadji	FW	1	1	1	0	3
(Algeria)	Mokhtar Dahmane	FW	2	0	0	0	2
(Algeria)	Braham Brakni	FW	1	0	0	0	1
(Algeria)	Smaïl Khabatou	DF	1	0	0	0	1
(Algeria)	Belkacem Chalane	MF	0	1	0	0	1
Unknown			7	0	0	0	7
Own Goals			0	0	0	0	0
Totals			31	5	2	1	39
