= Mokhtar Dahmane =

Algerian footballer (1931–2023)

Personal information
- Full name: Mokhtar Dahmane
- Date of birth: 27 December 1931
- Place of birth: Blida, Algeria
- Date of death: 25 July 2023 (aged 91)
- Place of death: Blida, Algeria
- Position: Forward

Youth career
- 1945–1952: USM Blida

Senior career*
Years	Team	Apps	(Gls)
1952–1956	USM Blida	83	(15)
1962–1966	USM Blida		(?)
- * Club domestic league appearances and goals

Mokhtar Dahmane (27 December 1931 - 25 July 2023) was an Algerian professional footballer who played as a forward.

== Career statistics ==
=== Club ===
Club	Season	League			Cup		Total	
Club	Season	Division	Apps	Goals	Apps	Goals	Apps	Goals
USM Blida	1951–52	Division d'Honneur	17	4	1	0	18	4
USM Blida	1952–53	Division d'Honneur	15	2	1	0	15	2
USM Blida	1953–54	Division d'Honneur	14	6	5	1	19	7
USM Blida	1954–55	Division d'Honneur	15	0	1	0	16	0
USM Blida	1955–56	Division d'Honneur	11	2	3	0	14	2
USM Blida	1962–63	Critériums d'Honneur	—	—	—	—	—	—
USM Blida	1963–64	Division d'Honneur	—	—	—	—	—	—
USM Blida	1964–65	Nationale I	—	—	—	—	—	—
USM Blida	1965–66	Nationale I	—	—	—	—	—	—
USM Blida	Total		—	—	—	—	—	—
USM Blida	Career total			0	0	0	0	0
