= USMA Stadium =

- USM Alger Stadium
- Interactive map of USMA Stadium
- Location: Aïn Bénian, Algiers, Algeria
- Coordinates: 36°48′3.8″N 3°2′53.2″E
- Capacity: 25,000

Tenant
- USM Alger (future)

USMA Stadium (Arabic: ملعب إتحاد الجزائر العاصمة) is a multi-use stadium in Aïn Bénian, just outside Algiers, Algeria, that is currently under construction. Once completed, it will be used mostly for football matches and will host the home matches of USM Alger. The stadium will have a capacity of 25,000 spectators. It is intended to replace the current stadium, which is the Omar Hammadi Stadium.
