= 1946–47 USM Blida season =

USM Blida
1946–47 season
- President: Hamid Kassoul
- Head coach: Belkacem Bouguerra II
- Stadium: FCB Stadium
- First Division: Champion
- Forconi Cup: Semi-Final
- North African Cup: Quarterfinal
- Top goalscorer: League: All: Abdelkader Djoudad (+20)
Home colours

In the 1946–47 season, USM Blida competed in the First Division for the 14th season French colonial era, as well as the Forconi Cup. They competed in First Division, and the North African Cup.

== Pre-season ==
Win Draw Loss

1 September 1946	USM Blida	3–0	USM Alger	Algiers
	Goal	Report		Stadium: Municipal
Note: Tournament Aïd el-Seghir

4 November 1946	USM Blida	1–0	JSM Alger	Algiers
	Belkacem Bouguerra	Report		Stadium: Municipal
Note: Tournament Aïd el-Kebir

== Competitions ==

USM Blida starting line-up against CS Hammam-Lif at the 1946–47 North African Cup round of 32, a match they won 0–1.

USM Blida starting line-up against USM Casablanca at the 1946–47 North African Cup quarterfinal, a match they lost 0–1.

=== Overview ===
Competition	Record							
Competition	G	W	D	L	GF	GA	GD	Win %
First Division	18	15	3	0	76	7	+69	83.33
Play-off	2	2	0	0	10	1	+9	100.00
Forconi Cup	5	4	0	1	13	4	+9	80.00
North African Cup	2	1	0	1	1	1	+0	50.00
Total	27	22	3	2	100	13	+87	81.48

=== First Division ===
==== League table ====
Pos	Team	Pld	W	D	L	GF	GA	GD	Pts	Relegation
1	USM Blida	18	15	3	0	76	7	+69	51	Promoted
2	Olympique de Marengo	18	13	2	3	55	17	+38	46	
3	Stade Guyotville	18	12	2	4	72	20	+52	44	
4	US Fort-de-l'Eau	18	11	2	5	54	30	+24	42	
5	Olympique de Tizi-Ouzou	18	9	4	5	40	18	+22	40	
6	AS Montpensier	18	9	2	7	46	37	+9	38	
7	Olympique de Rouïba	18	5	3	10	20	48	−28	31	
8	AST Alger	18	1	4	13	14	64	−50	24	
9	SA Belcourt	18	1	3	14	14	89	−75	23	
10	RAS Algéroise	18	0	3	15	14	75	−61	21	Relegated

Source: Competition

=== Matches ===
Win Draw Loss

6 October 1946 1	RAS Algéroise	0–7	USM Blida	Kouba
		Report

13 October 1946 2	Olympique de Rouïba	0–8	USM Blida	Rouiba
		Report

20 October 1946 3	AST Alger	0–6	USM Blida	Hydra
13:15		Report

10 November 1946 4	USM Blida	2–2	Olympique de Marengo	Blida
14:45	Dahmouche 60'; Djoudad 75'	Report	Oller 20'; Gatto 40'	Stadium: Zoubir Zouraghi Stadium; Referee: Todori

17 November 1946 5	USM Blida	9–0	SA Belcourt	Blida
		Report

8 December 1946 6	AS Montpensier	0–1	USM Blida	Algiers
		Report

15 December 1946 7	USM Blida	6–0	US Fort-de-l'Eau	Blida
		Report

29 December 1946 8	USM Blida	0–0	Olympique de Tizi-Ouzou	Blida
		Report

5 January 1947 9	Stade Guyotville	0–0	USM Blida	Guyotville
		Report

12 January 1947 10	USM Blida	7–0	RAS Algéroise	Blida
	Benelfoul; Djoudad; Dahmane; Dahmouche; Bob	Report

17 January 1947 11	USM Blida	3–0	Olympique de Rouïba	Blida
	Djoudad; Dahmouche	Report

26 January 1947 12	USM Blida	4–0	AST Alger	Blida
		Report

9 February 1947 13	Olympique de Marengo	2–3	USM Blida	Marengo
		Report

16 February 1947 14	SA Belcourt	0–5	USM Blida	El Biar
		Report

23 March 1947 15	USM Blida	5–1	AS Montpensier	Blida
		Report

30 March 1947 16	Olympique de Tizi-Ouzou	0–2	USM Blida	Tizi-Ouzou
		Report

13 April 1947 17	US Fort-de-l'Eau	1–3	USM Blida	Fort-de-l'Eau
		Report

27 April 1947 18	USM Blida	5–1	Stade Guyotville	Blida
	Djoudad; Dahmouche; Benelfoul	Report

=== Play-off ===
8 June 1947 Play-off 1	USM Blida	6–1	US Blida	Saint-Eugène, Algiers
	Djoudad 17'; Benelfoul; Bernou; Bensamet Menacer, Mansouri, Bouguerra, Zidoun, Bob, Zouraghi, Djoudad, Benelfoul, Bernou, Bensamet, Dahmouche	(1–1); Report	Alrando 15' Garguillo, Perals, Ribot, Perez, Ripoll, Doboeuf (blessé), Schutz, Alrando, Rubert, Louis, Cortès	Stadium: Saint-Eugène; Referee: Todori

15 June 1947 Play-off 2	USM Blida	4–0	US Blida	Belcourt, Algiers
16:45	Djoudad (red card); Dahmouche; Dahmouche; Djoudad; Dahmouche Menacer, Bouguerra, Mansouri, Chekaimi, Bob, Zouraghi, Benelfoul, Bensamet, Djoudad, Bernou, Dahmouche	(3–0); Report	(red card) Pérals Garguilo, Bolo, Pérals, Ripoll, Cortès, Ribaut, Ollive, Luis, Alrando, Schultz, Llopis	Stadium: Municipal; Referee: Riveccio

=== Forconi Cup ===
29 September 1946 2nd Round	USM Blida	2–1	JSM Boufarik	Béni Mered, Blida Province
15:00	Zouraghi; Djoudad Menacer, Mansouri, Rabah Hamou, Bensamet, Zouraghi, Zidoun, Benelfoul, Bernou, Djoudad, Hatem, Dahmouche	Report; Report	Derrouiche, Lazli Mohamed, Djeradi, Ali Cherif, Chergui Ali, Bouricha, Debbah, Taboudouche, Anine, Slimane Mohamed, Seghier	Referee: Martorelle

27 October 1946 3rd Round	USM Blida	4–1	SC Affreville	Marengo, Blida Province
14:45		Report

1 December 1946 4th round	USM Blida	2–1 (a.e.t.)	MC Alger	Boufarik, Blida Province
	Djoudad 89' (?); Zouraghi (red card) Menacer, Mansouri, Chekaïmi, Zouraghi, Imecaoudène, Bensamet, Benelfoul, Bouguerra, Djoudad, Bernou, Dahmouche	Report	Bouzid Abtouche, Abdoune, Hamoutène, Benhamou, Khabatou, Kouar, Missoum, Said Said, Bouzid, Tadjet, Deguigui	Referee: Attanasio

22 December 1946 5th Round	USM Blida	5–0	RC Maison Carrée	Boufarik, Blida Province
14:00	Dahmouche 25'; Djoudad 30' Menacer, Mansouri, Chekaïmi, Bensamet, Bob, Zouraghi, Benelfoul, Bouguerra, Djoudad, Bernou, Dahmouche	Report	Fajon, Tuffal I, Sellal I, Roux, Navarro, Ferrer, Ségui, Sellal II, Pico, Tuffal II, Khelifat	Referee: Todori

4 May 1947 Semi-Final	RS Alger	1–0	USM Blida	Algiers
	Gélabert Bouquet, Giuganti, Botella, Caillat, Zérapha, Sadi, Maouch, Magliozzi, Falandry, Imperato, Gélabert	Report	Meradi, Bouguerra, Mansouri, Hili, Bob, Zouraghi, Benelfoul, Bensamet, Djoudad, Bernou, Dahmouche	Stadium: Municipal

=== North African Cup ===
2 February 1947 16th finals	CS Hammam-Lif	0–1	USM Blida	Tunis
		Report	Ahmed Dahmouche 63' Menacer, Bouguerra, Mansouri, Bensamet, Bob, Zouraghi, Dahmouche, Hatem, Djoudad, Benelfoul, Bernou	Referee: Benzellat

9 March 1947 Quarterfinal	USM Blida	0–1	USM Casablanca	Algiers
	Menacer, Bouguerra, Mansouri, Bensamet, Bob, Zouraghi, Dahmouche, Hatem, Djoudad, Benelfoul, Bernou	Report	Martinez 33' Assaban, Savery, Missely, Bachir, Cabrera, Bouchta, Aomar, Lafaille, Martinez, Chicha, Nhaoui	Attendance: 12,000 (Revenue from the match exceeded 800,000 francs); Referee: Bernoud (From Tunisia)

== Players statistics ==
No.	Pos	Nat	Player	Total		First Division		Play-off		Forconi Cup		North African Cup	
No.	Pos	Nat	Player	Apps	Goals	Apps	Goals	Apps	Goals	Apps	Goals	Apps	Goals
Goalkeepers
	GK	(Algeria) ALG	Abderrahmane Menacer	7	0	0	0	2	0	3	0	2	0
	GK	(Algeria) ALG	Abdelaziz Meradi	1	0	0	0	0	0	1	0	0	0
Defenders
	DF	(Algeria) ALG	Ali Mansouri	8	0	0	0	2	0	4	0	2	0
	DF	(Algeria) ALG	Abdelaziz Chekaimi	3	0	0	0	1	0	2	0	0	0
	DF	(Algeria) ALG	Belkacem Bouguerra II	5	0	0	0	2	0	1	0	2	0
	DF	(Algeria) ALG	Kamel Hili	1	0	0	0	0	0	1	0	0	0
	DF	(Algeria) ALG	Rabah Zerrouki	0	0	0	0	0	0	0	0	0	0
Midfielders
	MF	(Algeria) ALG	Kadour Bensamet	8	1	0	0	2	1	4	0	2	0
	MF	(Algeria) ALG	Mohamed Imcaoudène as Bob	7	0	0	0	2	0	3	0	2	0
	MF	(Algeria) ALG	Mahmoud Zouraghi	8	1	0	0	2	0	4	1	2	0
	MF	(Algeria) ALG	Boualem Zidoun	2	0	0	0	1	0	1	0	0	0
	MF	(Algeria) ALG	Ahmed Bernou	8	2	0	0	2	2	4	0	2	0
Forwards
	FW	(Algeria) ALG	Ahmed Benelfoul (c)	8	2	0	0	2	2	4	0	2	0
	FW	(Algeria) ALG	Abdelkader Djoudad I	8	8	0	0	2	2	4	6	2	0
	FW	(Algeria) ALG	Abderrahmane Hatem	3	0	0	0	0	0	1	0	2	0
	FW	(Algeria) ALG	Ahmed Dahmouche	8	6	0	0	2	3	4	2	2	1
	FW	(Algeria) ALG	Bouguerra I	2	0	0	0	0	0	2	0	0	0

Reserve: Rabah Hamou, Bradai, M'henni Zahzah, Ali Reguieg, Boukhalfa, Laidi Mustapha, Youssari Embarek, Zouthi, Benazout, Bouguerra M, Bouchekour Mohamed.

=== Goalscorers ===
Player	Pos.	D1	PO	Cup	NAC	TOTAL
Abdelkader Djoudad	FW	8	2	5	0	+15
Ahmed Dahmouche	FW	4	3	2	1	+10
Ahmed Benelfoul	FW	3	2		0	+5
Ahmed Bernou	MF		2		0	+2
Kaddour Bensamet	MF		1		0	+1
Mohamed Imcaoudène as Bob	MF	1	0		0	+1
Abderrahmane Hatem	FW	1	0		0	+1
Totals		17+56	10	7+6	1	35+75

== Transfers ==
=== In ===
Player	From club
M'henni Zahzah	US Blida
Mustapha Laidi	US Blida
