= Mustapha Begga =

Algerian footballer (1934–2021)

Personal information
- Full name: Mustapha Begga
- Date of birth: 10 June 1934
- Place of birth: Blida, Algeria
- Date of death: 17 September 2021 (aged 87)
- Place of death: Blida, Algeria
- Position: Defender

Youth career
- 1947–1953: USM Blida

Senior career*
Years	Team	Apps	(Gls)
1953–1956	USM Blida		(?)
	fr:FC Blida		(?)
1962–1966	USM Blida		(?)
- * Club domestic league appearances and goals

Mustapha Begga (10 June 1934 - 17 September 2021) was a professional Algerian footballer who played as a defender.

== Career statistics ==
=== Club ===
Club	Season	League			Cup		Total	
Club	Season	Division	Apps	Goals	Apps	Goals	Apps	Goals
USM Blida	1953–54	Division d'Honneur	—	—	—	—	—	—
USM Blida	1954–55	Division d'Honneur	—	—	—	—	—	—
USM Blida	1955–56	Division d'Honneur	—	—	—	—	—	—
USM Blida	1962–63	Critériums d'Honneur	—	—	—	—	—	—
USM Blida	1963–64	Division d'Honneur	—	—	—	—	—	—
USM Blida	1964–65	Nationale I	—	—	—	—	—	—
USM Blida	1965–66	Nationale I	—	—	—	—	—	—
USM Blida	1966–67	Nationale I	—	—	—	—	—	—
USM Blida	Total		—	—	—	—	—	—
Career total			0	0	0	0	0	0
