= Zioui Brothers Stadium =

Multi-use stadium in Hussein Dey, Algeria

- Interactive map of Zioui Brothers Stadium
- Location: Hussein Dey, Algeria
- Coordinates: 36°44′38″N 3°5′31″E
- Capacity: 5,000
- Surface: Artificial turf

Construction
- Opened: 1940

Tenant
- NA Hussein Dey

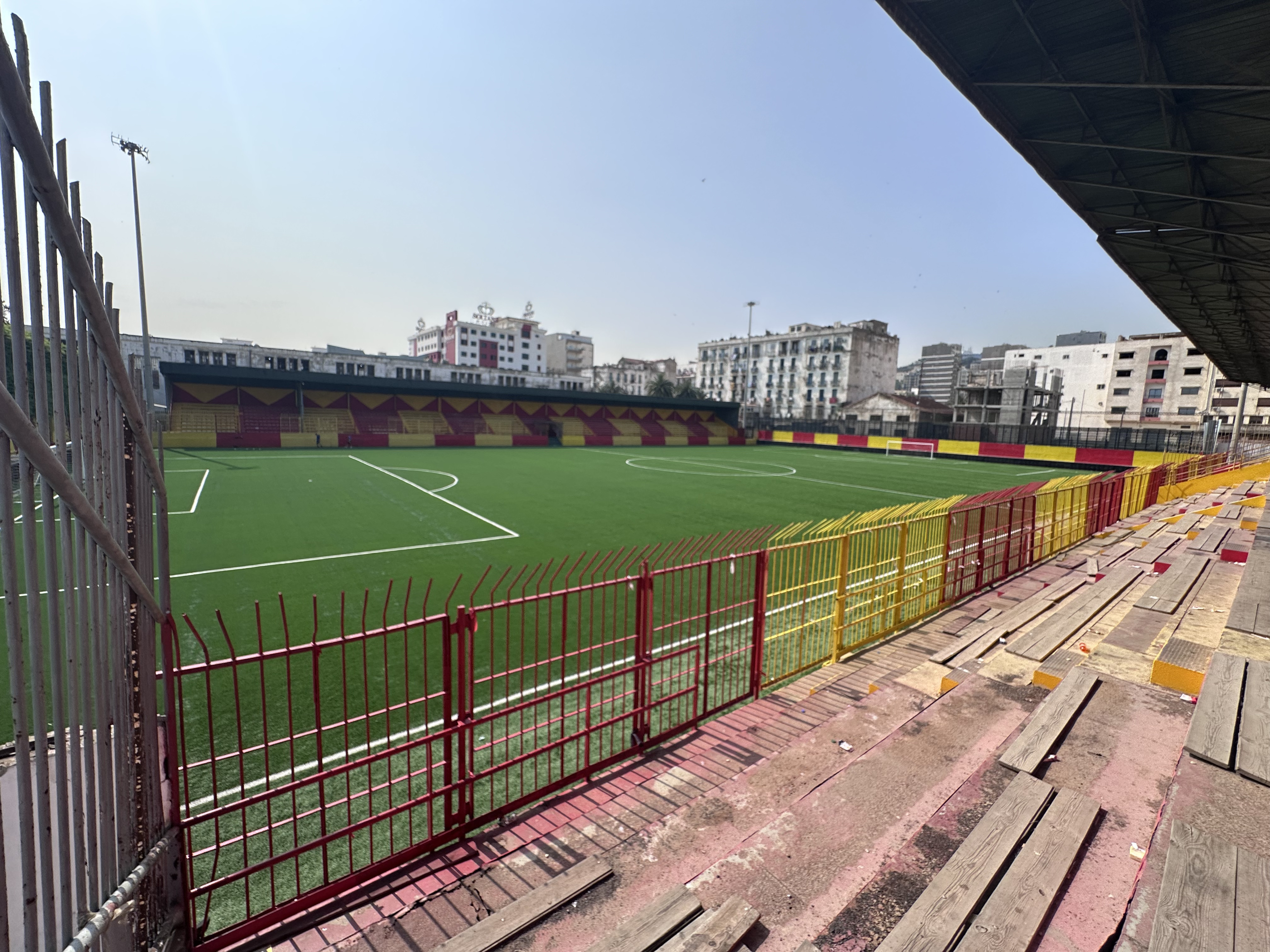
Zioui Brothers Stadium

Zioui Brothers Stadium (Arabic: ملعب الإخوة زيوي) is a multi-use stadium in Hussein Dey, Algeria. It is currently used mostly for football matches and is the home ground of NA Hussein Dey. The stadium holds 5,000 people.
