= Maâmar Ousser =

Algerian footballer (1935–2023)

Personal information
- Date of birth: 7 February 1935
- Place of birth: Blida, French Algeria
- Date of death: 13 December 2023 (aged 88)
- Place of death: Blida, Algeria
- Position: Full-back

Youth career
- 1953–1956: USM Blida

Senior career*
Years	Team	Apps	(Gls)
1960–1962	fr:FC Blida		
1962–1966	USM Blida		

International career
1964	Algeria U23	1	(0)
- * Club domestic league appearances and goals

Maâmar Ousser (7 February 1935 – 13 December 2023) was an Algerian professional footballer who played as a full-back. Ousser died in Blida on 13 December 2023, at the age of 88.

== Career statistics ==
=== Club ===
Appearances and goals by club, season and competition
Club	Season	League			Cup		Total	
Club	Season	Division	Apps	Goals	Apps	Goals	Apps	Goals
USM Blida	1962–63	Critériums d'Honneur						
USM Blida	1963–64	Division d'Honneur						
USM Blida	1964–65	Nationale I						
USM Blida	1965–66	Nationale I						
USM Blida	1966–67	Nationale I						
USM Blida	Total							
Career total			0	0	0	0	0	0
