= Aïn Bénian, Algiers =

Coordinates: 36°48′11″N 2°55′18″E

Aïn Benian, Algiers عين البنيان
- Commune
- Interactive map of Aïn Benian, Algiers
- Country: Algeria
- Province: Algiers

Area
  - Land: 78.25 km^{2} (30.21 sq mi)

Population (2008)
  - Total: 68,354
  - Density: 5,004/km^{2} (12,960/sq mi)
- Time zone: UTC+1 (West Africa Time)

Aïn Benian (Arabic: عين البنيان) is a commune in Algiers Province and suburb of the city of Algiers in northern Algeria. As of the 2008 census, the commune had a population of 68,354.

El-Benian, is a coastal town situated in the region Algiers, Algeria.

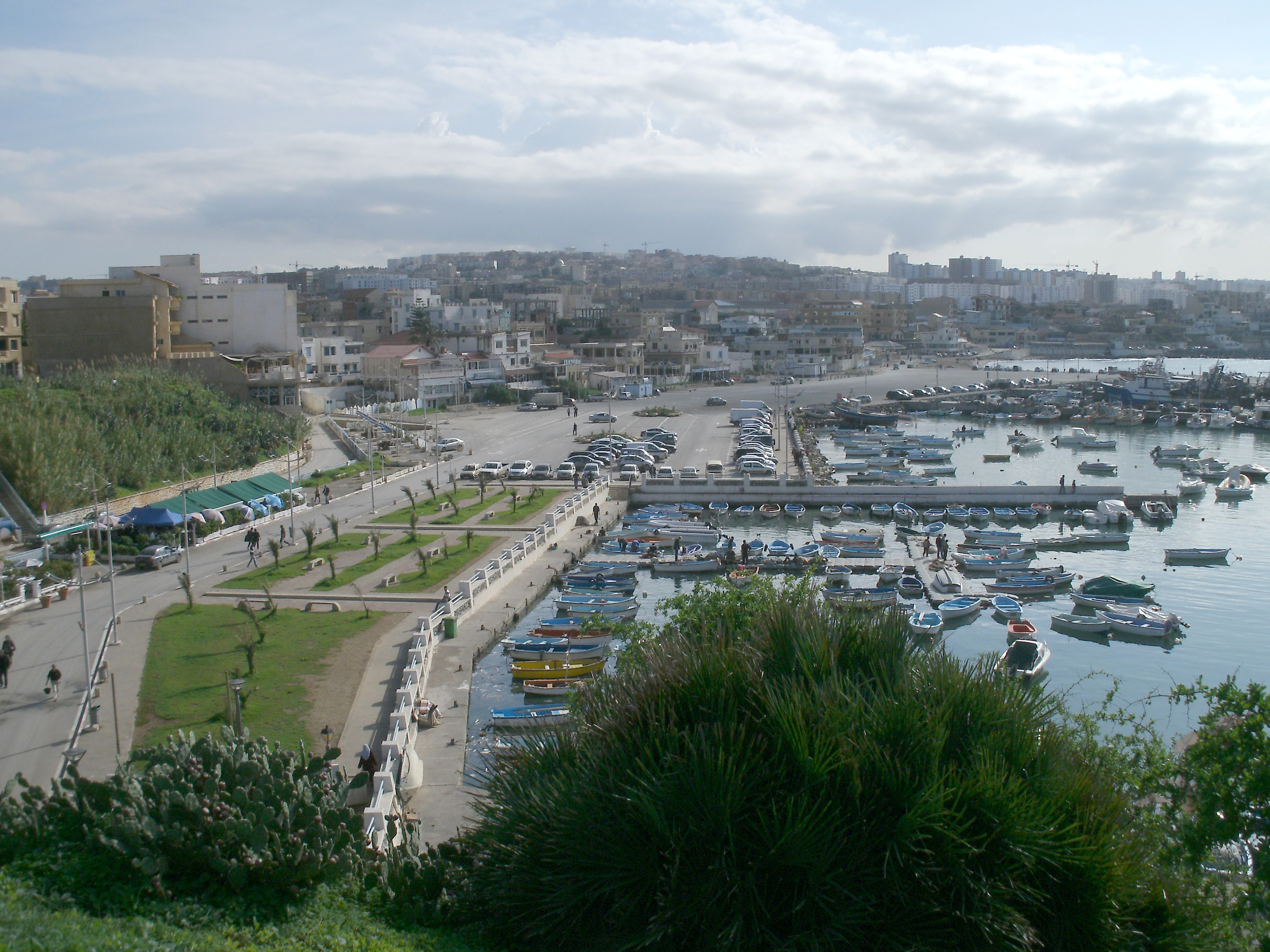
Aïn Bénian, Algiers

== Sports ==
- USMA Stadium
