= Smaïl Khabatou =

Algerian footballer (1920–2014)

Personal information
- Date of birth: 8 September 1920
- Place of birth: Algiers, French Algeria
- Date of death: 15 September 2014 (aged 94)

Youth career
- Stade Algérien de Belcourt

Senior career*
Years	Team	Apps	(Gls)
????–1950	MC Alger		
1950–1956	USM Blida		

Managerial career
- 1945–1950: MC Alger
- 1950–1956: USM Blida
- OM Ruisseau
- WA Boufarik
- 1963–1964: Algeria
- 1965–1966: Algeria
- 1969: USM Blida
- 1976–1977: MC Alger
- * Club domestic league appearances and goals

Smaïl Khabatou (8 September 1920 – 15 September 2014) was an Algerian football player and manager.

== Playing career ==
Khabatou played club football for Stade Algérien de Belcourt, MC Alger and USM Blida.

== Coaching career ==
Khabatou was player-manager of MC Alger and USM Blida, and also managed OM Ruisseau and WA Boufarik, as well as the Algerian national team.
