= Brakni Brothers Stadium =

Soccer stauium in Bilda, Algeria

Coordinates: 36°29′25″N 2°50′48″E

Brakni Brothers Stadium ملعب الاخوة براكني
- Brakni
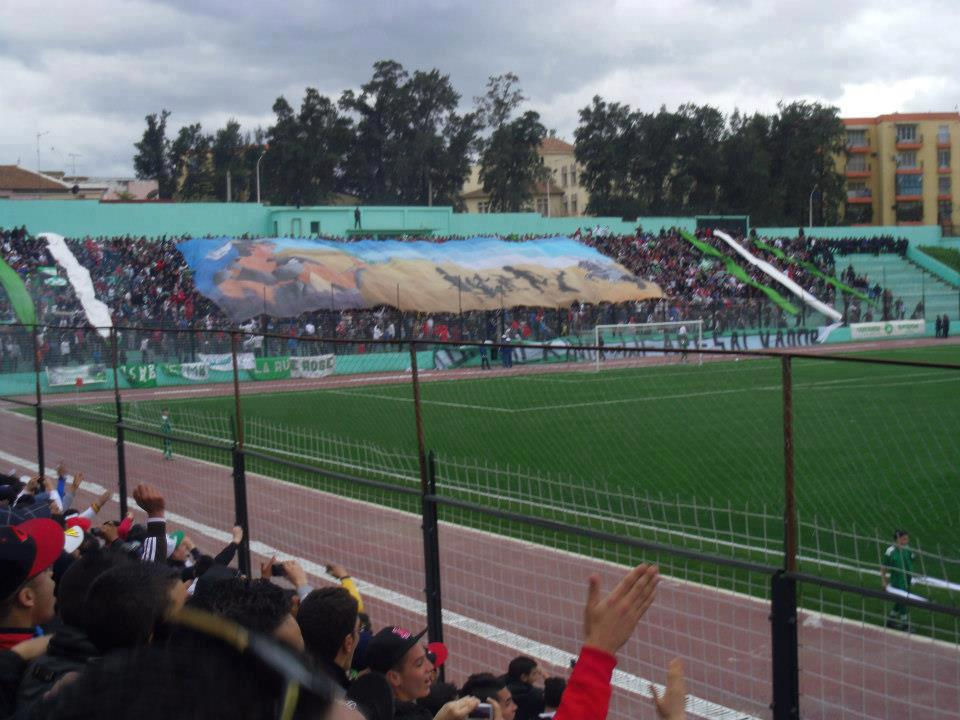
- Interactive map of Brakni Brothers Stadium ملعب الاخوة براكني
- Location: Blida, Algeria
- Owner: PMA of Blida
- Capacity: 10,000

Construction
- Opened: 6 February 1978

Tenant
- USM Blida

Brakni Brothers Stadium (Arabic: ملعب الاخوة براكني) is a soccer stadium in Blida, Algeria, it has a maximum capacity of 10,000 people. It was replaced by the bigger Stade Mustapha Tchaker currently used mostly for football matches, and for the national team since 2006.
