= History of USM Alger (2010–present) =

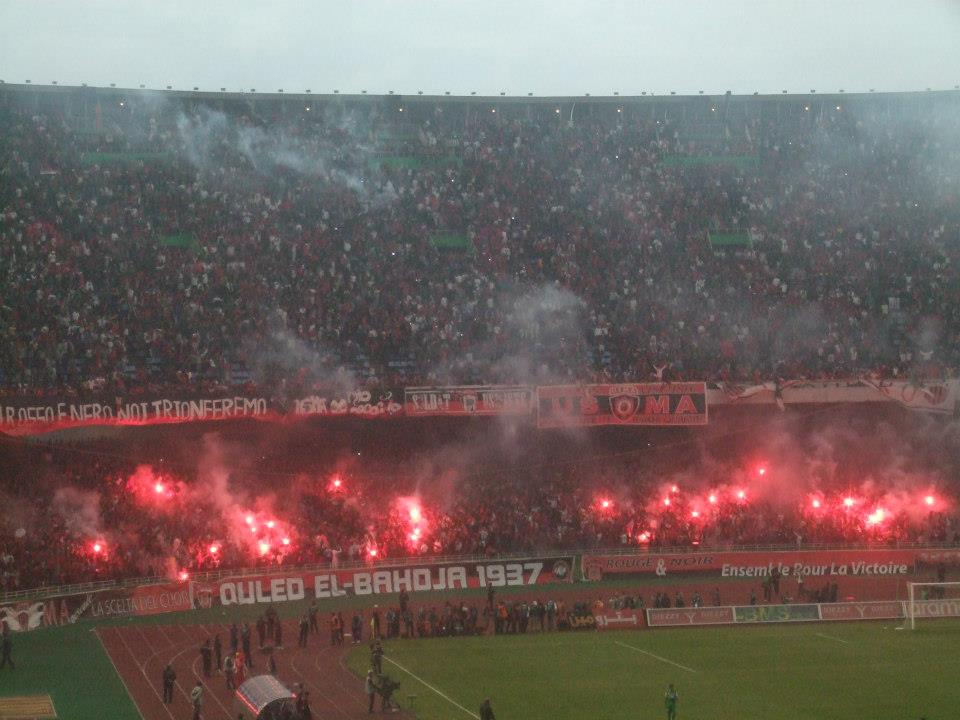
Ouled EL Bahdja fans during the final UAFA Club Cup, Stade 5 Juillet 1962 in Algiers, May 14, 2013 vs Al-Arabi SC.

The history of Union Sportive Médina d'Alger from 2010 to the present day, commonly referred to as USM Alger or simply USMA, is a professional football club based in Algiers, Algeria. The club was founded on 5 July 1937 and has become one of the most prominent teams in Algerian football. USMA currently competes in Ligue 1, the top tier of Algerian football. The club won its first major trophy in 1963, defeating MC Alger in the Critérium d'Honneur final. USMA has reached the cup final 17 times a national record, including an impressive run of five consecutive appearances from 1969 to 1973.

The club’s first international title came in 2013, when USMA won the UAFA Club Cup, defeating Al-Arabi of Kuwait 3–2 on aggregate. However, this title is not recognized by FIFA as an official continental trophy. The club’s greatest continental triumph came in 2023, when USM Alger won the CAF Confederation Cup by defeating Young Africans of Tanzania on away goals, after a 2–2 draw on aggregate. This marked the first major continental title in the club’s history. Later that same year, USMA won the CAF Super Cup by beating Al Ahly 1–0, further cementing their legacy on the African stage.

== Haddad ownership (2010–20) ==
=== Second professional era & Dream Team ===
I want to make this club the best in the country. The USMA is a great team and we will naturally have to play to win titles, that's the least. Personally, I will do my best to ensure that the club does not miss anything on a daily basis. We have many projects and we are very keen to achieve them.

— Ali Haddad a statement about his ambitions with the team.

In a joint decision by the Ligue de Football Professionnel and the Algerian Football Federation, the Algerian football championship was set to undergo professionalization starting from the 2010–11 season. As a result, all Algerian football clubs, which until then held semi-professional status, were to become fully professional that season.

Mohamed Raouraoua, president of the Algerian Football Federation, had advocated for professionalism since taking office. He emphasized a new management approach based on discipline and seriousness, especially given the decline of Algerian football in recent years. The poor performance was largely attributed to the mismanagement of clubs, which had fallen behind their counterparts in neighboring countries that had embraced professional models and made significant progress, particularly at the continental level.

A key milestone in this shift came on August 4, 2010, when USM Alger became the first Algerian club to go public in line with the league's professionalization. Businessman Ali Haddad became the majority shareholder, investing 700 million Algerian dinars to acquire an 83% stake in the club. Subsequently, on October 27, 2010, Haddad replaced Saïd Allik who had served as club president for 18 years as the new president and owner of USM Alger.

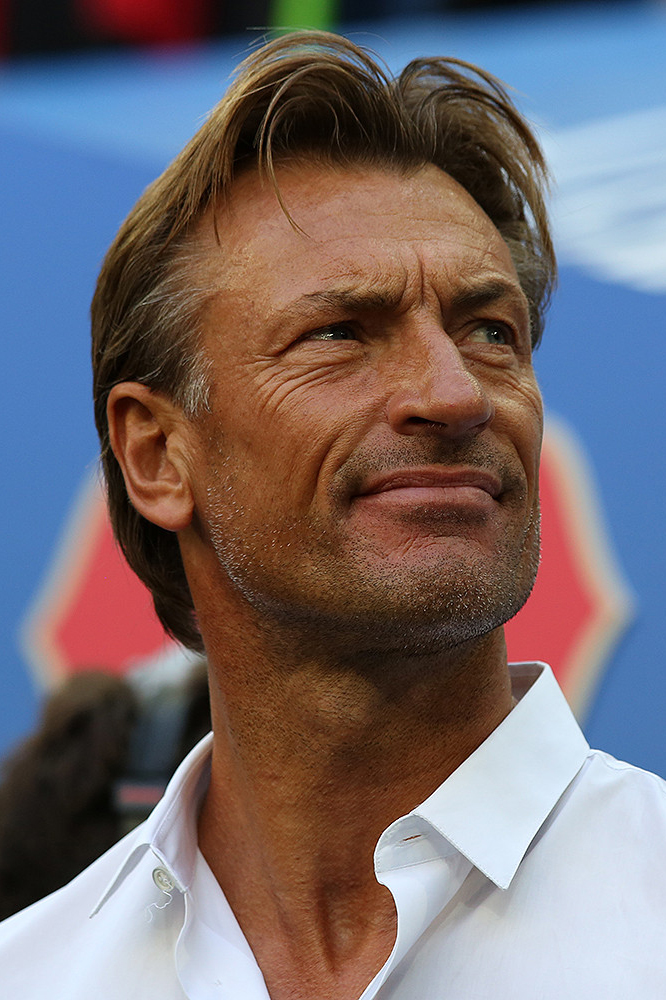
French coach Hervé Renard managed the team for a nine-month spell in 2011.

The first season of professional football in Algeria proved difficult for USM Alger and was their worst since the 1999–2000 season. Head coach Noureddine Saadi was dismissed and replaced by Frenchman Hervé Renard, whose contract included a clause allowing him to leave if offered a position with a national team. USM Alger endured a tough campaign, going nearly five months without a victory. The team only secured its place in the top flight in the final round of the season, following a crucial win against USM Annaba.

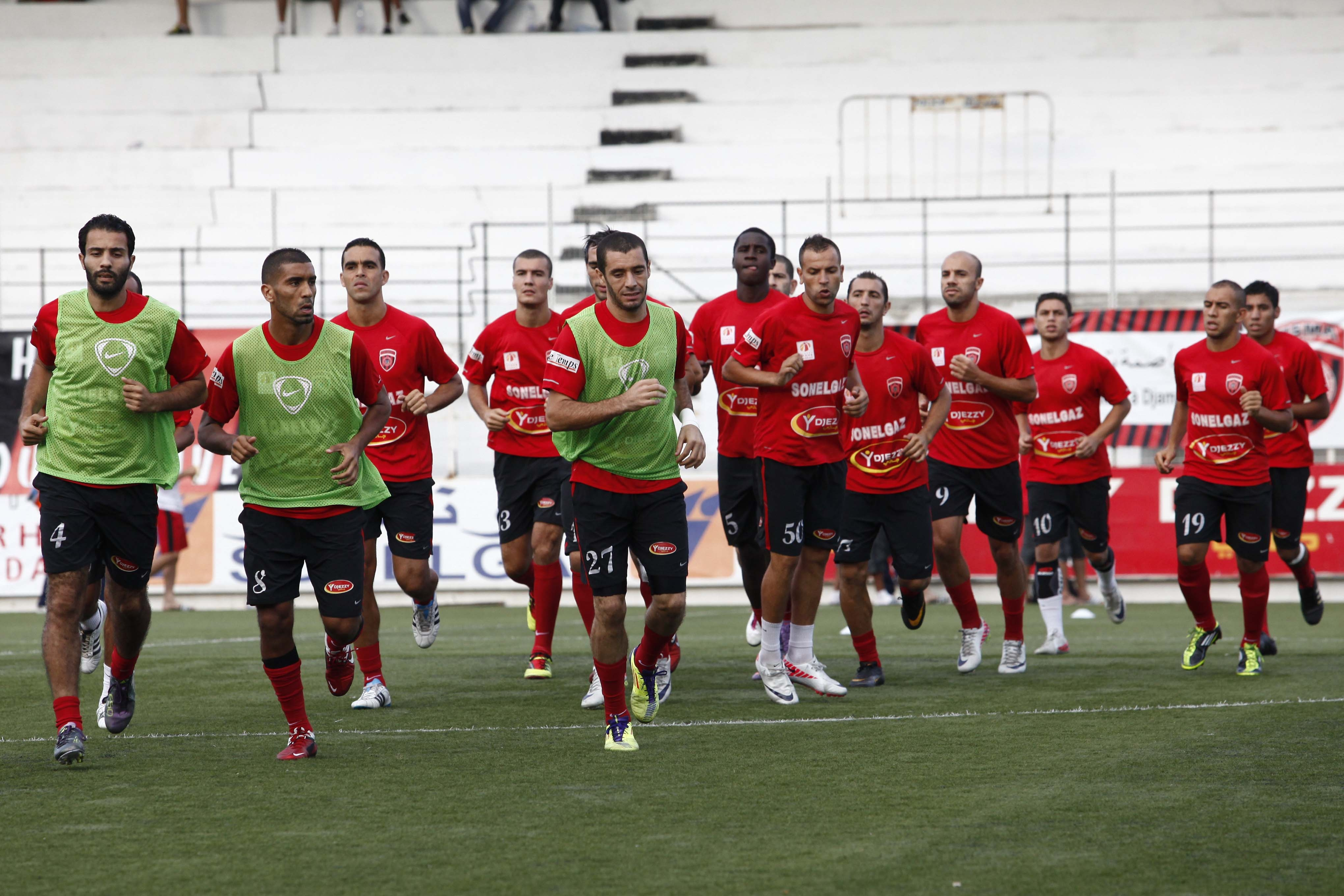
USM Alger Dream Team in training 2011–12 season.

In response to the poor season, the club made major moves during the summer transfer window. USMA signed 15 top level players, including four from rivals ES Sétif. Meanwhile, two of the club’s longest serving players, Hocine Achiou and Karim Ghazi, were released after the coach declined to keep them in the squad. On July 28, 2011, USM Alger signed an indefinite sponsorship deal with the American sportswear brand Nike. These sweeping changes significantly reshaped the team's core, prompting the Algerian media particularly local newspapers to nickname USM Alger the "Dream Team".

On April 29, 2011, USM Alger president Ali Haddad appointed Mouldi Aïssaoui as the club's General Director. However, less than a year into his tenure, on February 28, 2012, Aïssaoui announced his resignation from the Société Sportive par Actions (SSPA), citing internal conspiracies. He explained, "I had a frank discussion with USMA President Haddad, during which I informed him of my decision to leave my position. He certainly wanted to talk me out of it, but I made him understand that this decision was irrevocable".

During the 2011–12 Ligue 1 season, USM Alger remained in title contention until the final round. On April 14, 2012, they faced MC Saïda at Stade 13 Avril 1958 in a crucial match to avoid relegation to Ligue Professionnelle 2. In the final minute of the game, Nouri Ouznadji scored a dramatic equalizer to keep USMA safe. However, the post match events were marred by violence. As USM Alger players made their way to the dressing rooms, they were attacked by unknown assailants. The most serious incident involved Abdelkader Laïfaoui, who was stabbed with a knife. He suffered deep wounds, required stitches, and had to spend the night in the hospital. In response, the club filed a lawsuit against unknown perpetrators and announced it would refuse to play in Saïda for the next five years.

A month later, on May 12, 2012, USM Alger hosted JSM Béjaïa in Bologhine. The match was filled with controversy after referee Farouk Houasnia awarded USMA three penalties. JSM Béjaïa players responded by sarcastically applauding the referee, viewing the decisions as favoritism meant to help USM Alger in the title race. Despite the penalties, USMA lost the match 4–3 a result that cost them the championship. Nevertheless, the season ended on a positive note: after a six-year absence, USM Alger returned to continental competition by qualifying for the CAF Confederation Cup. The club was also invited by the Union of Arab Football Associations (UAFA) to participate in the newly revamped UAFA Club Cup.

The season also saw the end of the professional career of Mohamed "Hamia" Boualem, who officially retired almost three years after his last appearance for the club. Boualem had played his final match on March 24, 2012, against CS Constantine, coming off in the 76th minute. Recurring injuries affected his career, and during a training session, he suffered a serious injury that led to his early retirement from professional football.

=== From Setbacks to Silverware: USM Alger's Journey ===
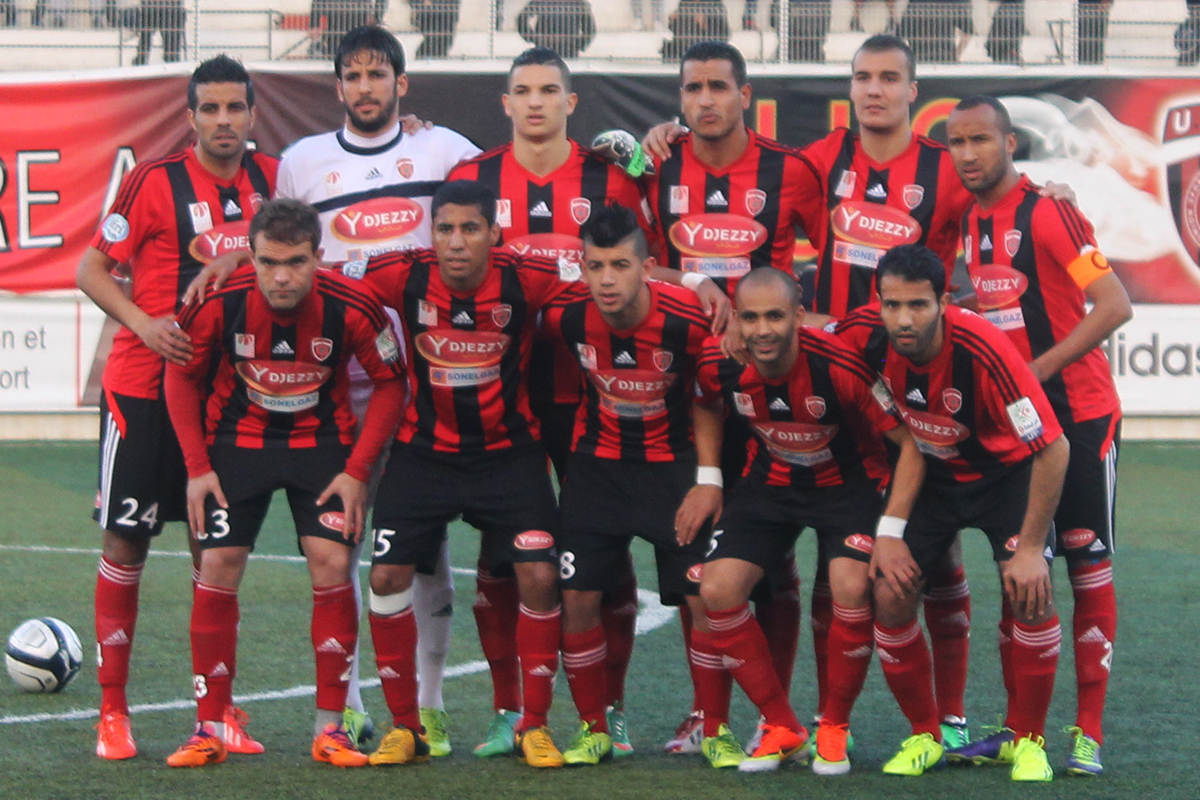
Team USM Alger Champion 2013–14 Algerian Ligue Professionnelle 1.

During the 2012–13 season, USM Alger was led by Argentine coach Miguel Angel Gamondi. The season began poorly and after a loss to ES Sétif, Gamondi was dismissed and replaced by former Olympique de Marseille coach Rolland Courbis. Under Courbis, the team made a strong comeback, finishing the first half of the season with six wins, two draws, and one defeat. However, the second half of the Ligue Professionnelle 1 campaign saw a decline in form, making it clear that winning the league would be difficult. The club began to shift focus to the Algerian Cup and the Arab Club Champions Cup.

In the Algerian Cup, USMA reached the semi-finals and secured victory against MC Oran with a decisive goal by Noureddine Daham, qualifying for the final for the 17th time in the club’s history and the first in six years. In the final, USM Alger faced city rivals MC Alger in a fifth Algiers Derby final. Mokhtar Benmoussa scored the only goal, giving USMA their eighth Algerian Cup title and their first victory over MC Alger in a final after four previous defeats. The post-match ceremony was marred by MC Alger's refusal to collect their medals in protest of referee Djamel Haimoudi’s officiating.

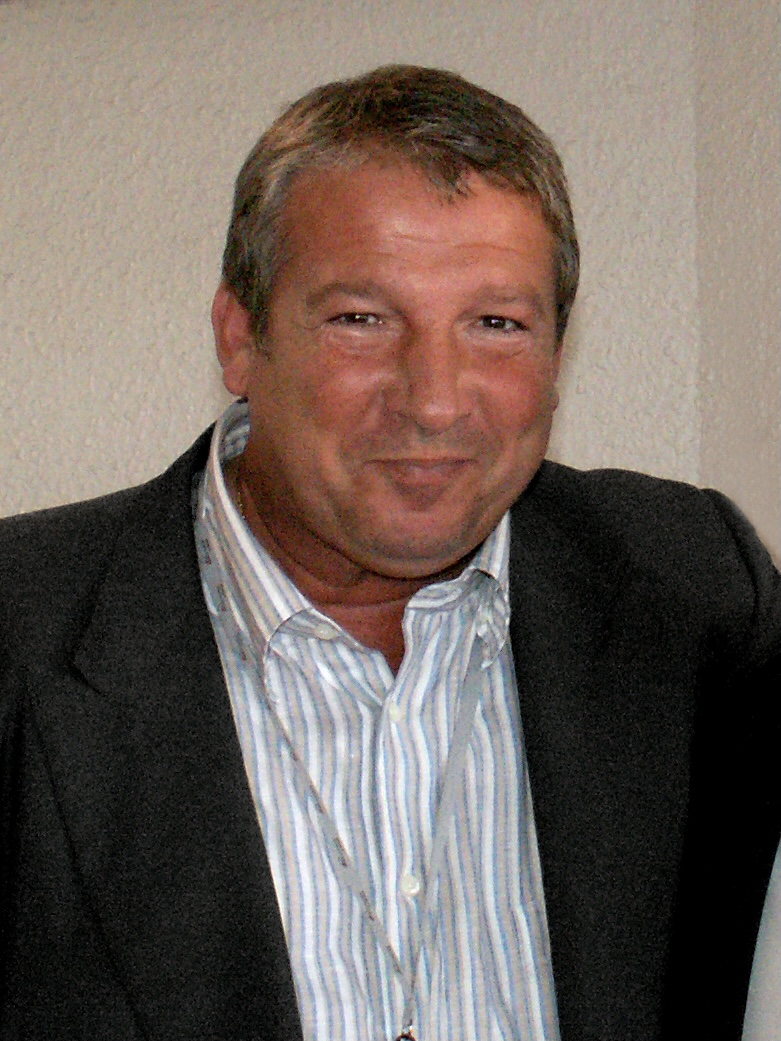
Rolland Courbis, who coached USM Alger from 2012 to 2013, became the first foreign manager in the club's history to win a title.

In the Arab Club Champions Cup, they advanced through the early rounds easily, but faced a tough semi-final against Ismaily SC of Egypt, which they won in a penalty shootout marking their first ever appearance in the competition's final. In contrast, the Confederation Cup was not prioritized, USM Alger traveled to Gabon with a reduced squad of only 16 players to face US Bitam. The defeat came as no surprise, as the Red and Black appeared largely uninterested in the African campaign, which had been deemed exhausting by both the staff and players. Prioritizing domestic objectives, USMA exits the continental stage with neither surprise nor apparent regret. On May 14, 2013, USMA captured their first Arab Club Champions Cup title, defeating Al-Arabi of Kuwait 3–2 on aggregate in the final. Prime Minister Abdelmalek Sellal attended the match and handed the trophy to team captain Mohamed Rabie Meftah.

On 21 September 2013 two USM Alger supporters, Azeeb Sufyan and Saif al-Din Darhoum, died after part of the Stade 5 Juillet 1962 collapsed following a match against MC Alger. Several hundred others were injured, casting a shadow over the victory. The drama occurred ten minutes after the end of the match. In the 2013–14 season, after their domestic cup and Arab triumphs, USM Alger set their sights on ending a nine year league title drought. However, after a win over CRB Aïn Fakroun on November 2, 2013, Courbis resigned, citing pressure and a desire to return to France to coach Montpellier. Courbis was replaced by Hubert Velud, who had won the league with ES Sétif the previous season. Velud's tenure started exceptionally well, with USMA going unbeaten until the season’s end, winning 16 matches, including eight in a row, USMA dominated the league and clinched the title in style, finishing 14 points clear of their longtime rivals, JS Kabylie. This marked first league title since the 2004–05 season and their first in the professional era. The club also won the Algerian Super Cup against ES Sétif.

This terrible news is saddening for football in our nation and in Cameroon and arrives like a bombshell just hours after the meeting with USM Alger which was played in Tizi Ouzou. In these painful circumstances, USM Alger and its members send their deepest condolences to the family of the deceased and to JS Kabylie. May Albert Ebossé rest in peace.

— USM Alger a statement about Albert Ebossé Bodjongo Death.

In the 2014–15 season, the team’s campaign began with a Super Cup defeat to MC Alger. The match was controversial assistant referee Mounir Bitam removed his shirt in protest, alleging he had been pressured to favor Mouloudia. He later apologized to USM Alger's administration and supporters. In the league, results were inconsistent.

On 23 August 2014, USM Alger secured a dramatic 2–1 win over JS Kabylie with a late goal from Youcef Belaïli. However, the match was overshadowed when Albert Ebossé Bodjongo, a JS Kabylie player, was fatally struck by a projectile as players were leaving the field. He died in hospital hours later at age 24. USM Alger issued a statement offering condolences to Ebossé's family and JS Kabylie.

Following a poor run, Velud was dismissed despite his earlier success. He was replaced by German coach Otto Pfister. But the team went winless in eight matches and was eliminated from the Algerian Cup by ASO Chlef. Pfister was sacked less than three months after his appointment. The season ended with Mounir Zeghdoud and Mahieddine Meftah taking over temporarily. USM Alger secured league survival in the final round with a win over ASO Chlef.

=== Continental Glory and Domestic Shifts ===

The usual starting line-up of the 2015 CAF Champions League Final Second leg Runner-up team

In the summer of 2015, Miloud Hamdi was officially appointed head coach of USM Alger for a three-season term. Although expectations were modest, Hamdi led the team to an impressive run in the Champions League. USM Alger finished first in the group stage and faced Al Hilal in the semi-finals. They pulled off a surprise victory in Sudan and secured a draw at Omar Hamadi Stadium, qualifying for the final of a continental competition for the first time in the club’s history. In the final, USM Alger faced TP Mazembe but suffered defeat in both legs, losing 4–1 on aggregate. Controversy arose regarding the choice of venue for the final match. While there was debate between using the larger Stade du 5 Juillet and the smaller Omar Hamadi Stadium, the club’s management, technical staff, and players preferred the latter. This decision was unpopular among fans due to the stadium’s limited capacity and artificial turf, especially given the historic nature of the final.

Meanwhile, star player Youcef Belaïli was suspended by the Confederation of African Football (CAF) for two years after testing positive for cocaine during an anti-doping control following the match against MC El Eulma on August 7, 2015, in the CAF Champions League. Belaïli admitted to the offense and subsequently tested positive again during a Ligue 1 match against CS Constantine on September 19, 2015. As a result, Belaïli received a four-year suspension and his contract with USM Alger was terminated. On the domestic front, USM Alger won the Ligue 1 title for the seventh time in its history and the second in the professional era. The club had a strong start to the season, going unbeaten in 17 consecutive matches, including a streak of seven straight victories.

As defending champions, a "new-look" USM Alger entered the following season determined to retain their crown. In the Super Cup, under interim coach Mustapha Aksouh, USM Alger claimed the title by defeating city rivals MC Alger. New head coach Paul Put observed the match from the stands as the team lifted the trophy. On November 5, in Put's first match as head coach, USM Alger suffered a defeat in the derby against USM El Harrach. From that point on, the team struggled with away form, failing to secure a single win outside Algiers during the first half of the season. This poor run ultimately cost USM Alger the chance to defend their league title. In the 28th round, despite a resounding victory over USM Bel-Abbès, they were officially eliminated from title contention following ES Sétif’s win.

In the CAF Champions League group stage, USM Alger faced CAPS United in the final round in front of over 50,000 spectators. The team needed a win to secure the top spot in the group, and they delivered with a dominant 4–1 victory. In the 80th minute, the match paused to commemorate the 80th anniversary of the club's founding. The atmosphere in the stadium turned celebratory, with a special tribute involving the presence of former club legends such as Bengana, Mansouri, Abdouche, Mouassi, Lalili, Hadj Adlane, Ghoul, Achiou, Dziri, Rahim, and others. Also present were former coach Noureddine Saadi, former president Saïd Allik, and prominent figures from Algeria’s National Liberation Front, including Saadi Yacef, a former club president and hero of the Algerian War of Independence. The celebration was made complete as USM Alger secured qualification for the Champions League quarter-finals.

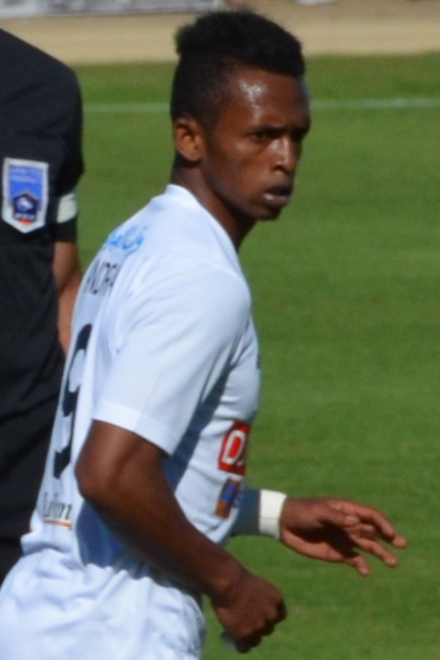
Carolus Andriamatsinoro The most foreign player played with USM Alger, Leaving the club after five years with them.

In the CAF Champions League semi-final, USM Alger faced WAC Casablanca in a much-anticipated regional clash. Despite tense diplomatic relations between Algeria and Morocco, the encounter unfolded in a remarkably fraternal atmosphere, reflecting the historic and cultural ties between the two clubs both founded in 1937. The supporters of Wydad were warmly welcomed in Algiers, receiving free entry to the stadium, and WAC Casablanca reciprocated the gesture during the second leg in Morocco.

Following their continental campaign, USM Alger returned to Ligue 1 competition, but tensions quickly surfaced. In the first league match back, against USM El Harrach, the players of the Soustara team were heavily insulted by the fans present at the Bologhine stadium. As soon as they appeared on the pitch, they were targeted by supporters who were deeply disappointed by the team’s elimination in the semi-finals of the caf Champions League. USMA president Rebouh Haddad was also subjected to insults from the club's own fans. The Red and Black supporters spared no one; after turning their anger on their president, they directed it at the coach, Belgian Paul Put.

Despite this difficult atmosphere, the team bounced back with a resounding 4–0 win in the derby against CR Belouizdad. However, inconsistency returned in a crucial home match against league leaders CS Constantine, where USM Alger suffered a 2–1 defeat. Immediately after the match, Paul Put announced his resignation. He took full responsibility for the team’s setbacks and stated that it had been an honor to coach USM Alger. In his post-match comments, Put criticized the players' lack of commitment, saying they "did not put their feet on the ground" and hinted at deeper internal issues within the squad.

=== Abdelhakim Serrar Appointed General Manager of USM Alger ===
Just one day after the resignation of coach Paul Put, the administration of USM Alger appointed Franco-Algerian coach Miloud Hamdi until the end of the season. Hamdi had previously managed the team during the 2015–16 season, leading them to a Ligue 1 title and a CAF Champions League final. On February 28, 2018, following a 2–2 draw in the Algiers Derby. club president Ali Haddad replaced his brother Rabouh Haddad as general manager with former international player and ex ES Sétif president Abdelhakim Serrar. After a derby loss to CR Belouizdad, Serrar and coach Hamdi mutually agreed to part ways at the end of the season. On April 3, Serrar traveled to Morocco and reached a preliminary agreement with Baddou Zaki to take over for the next season. However, on April 12, Zaki withdrew due to disagreements over contract terms. Despite the turbulent season, USM Alger striker Oussama Darfalou was crowned league top scorer with 18 goals, becoming only the second player from the club to achieve this honor after the first in 2003.

On April 4, 2018, reserve team (U21) goalkeeper Abderrahmane Bouyermane died following a Cardiac arrest. The 20-year-old collapsed during warm-up before a training session, as announced on the club’s official website. At the end of the season, USM Alger began its search for a new head coach and underwent significant changes to the squad. Several key players departed, most notably defender Ayoub Abdellaoui, who signed with Swiss club FC Sion. and striker Oussama Darfalou, who joined Dutch side Vitesse. After a month-long search, the club appointed French coach Thierry Froger to lead the team into the new season. USM Alger entered the campaign with ambitions on four competitive fronts, with the Confederation Cup being the primary target. However, their continental hopes were cut short as they were eliminated in the quarter-finals by Egyptian side Al-Masry.

Due to the Confederation of African Football (CAF) not approving Omar Hamadi Stadium, the club was required to choose an alternative home venue. Among the options Stade Omar Oucief, Ahmed Zabana Stadium in Oran, Stade 8 Mai 1945 in Sétif, and Stade Mohamed Hamlaoui in Constantine the management opted for Sétif. The decision was based on several factors, including the city’s proximity to Algiers, which would facilitate travel for supporters. Additionally, a strong bond of brotherhood exists between USM Alger and ES Sétif fans, who have historically supported each other in international competitions. In the Arab Club Champions Cup, USM Alger had high ambitions, driven in part by the tournament’s lucrative financial rewards, which exceeded $15 million more than those offered by the CAF Champions League. However, the team's journey ended in the second round after a narrow 4–3 aggregate loss to Sudanese Al-Merrikh.

Earlier in the tournament, during a home match against Iraqi club Al-Quwa Al-Jawiya at Omar Hamadi Stadium, a major incident occurred. In the 70th minute, Al-Quwa Al-Jawiya players withdrew from the field in protest after sections of the Algerian crowd chanted slogans perceived as offensive, including references to former Iraqi president Saddam Hussein and anti-Shia rhetoric. The incident sparked diplomatic backlash. In response, the Iraqi Ministry of Foreign Affairs summoned Algeria's ambassador in Baghdad, condemning the chants as sectarian and deeply offensive. Ahmed Mahjoub, spokesperson for the Iraqi Foreign Ministry, stated that Baghdad expressed “the government and the people of Iraq’s indignation… at the glorification of the horrible face of Saddam Hussein’s deadly dictatorial regime.” Following the uproar, USM Alger general manager Abdelhakim Serrar issued an apology, stating: “If the fans’ behavior offended the Iraqi team, I offer my apologies.” Team captain and goalkeeper Mohamed Lamine Zemmamouche also extended a personal apology to the Iraqi delegation for the conduct of the supporters.

Following their exit from continental and regional competitions, USM Alger turned its full attention to the domestic league. The club performed strongly in Ligue 1 and led the standings, securing first place at the end of the first phase of the championship, closely followed by JS Kabylie. However, political and administrative turbulence soon impacted the team. Nationwide protests erupted in Algeria, and the club's owner, Ali Haddad, was arrested on corruption charges. This upheaval affected the team's performance on the pitch. USM Alger suffered three consecutive derby losses against Paradou AC, MC Alger, and CR Belouizdad which reduced their lead to just one point over their nearest rivals, with four matches remaining in the season.

The season was tough on all counts and I took my responsibilities to the end. Now it's time for me to pull out and officially announce it: I will not be the CEO of USMA next year.

— Abdelhakim Serrar a statement about his resignation.

On April 30, 2019, the board of directors of SSPA USMA convened and officially acknowledged the vacancy in the club presidency following Haddad’s imprisonment. Boualem Chendri was unanimously elected as the new president, while the Haddad family’s company, ETRHB Haddad, remained the club’s majority shareholder. Despite the instability, USM Alger managed to recover and sealed the Ligue 1 title on May 26, 2019, with a decisive 3–1 away victory against CS Constantine. It marked the club’s eighth domestic league championship, finishing just one point ahead of JS Kabylie. Immediately following the title win, general manager Abdelhakim Serrar announced his resignation from his position.

=== The end of the ETRHB Haddad era ===
On June 2, 2019, it became official: the Haddad family announced the sale of its 92% stake in SSPA USMA. The club's communication officer, Amine Tirmane, made the announcement on Echourouk TV. This decision came in the wake of club owner Ali Haddad’s imprisonment and the freezing of all the club’s financial accounts. On June 10, 2019, several sports figures and former USM Alger officials formed a rescue committee to address the many problems facing the club. More than twenty former club players, including Tarek Hadj Adlane, Karim Ghazi, Hocine Achiou, and Hocine Metref, answered the call. At the same time, the Haddad family was actively seeking to sell its shares in the SSPA. On June 24, 2019, USM Alger appointed Billel Dziri as the new head coach. A former club star, Dziri was given full authority to choose his technical staff. On August 4, 2019, Al-Hayat Petroleum Company agreed to cover the club’s travel costs to Niger for the preliminary round of the CAF Champions League. The same company also expressed interest in purchasing the majority of the club’s shares.

On September 4, 2019, the USM Alger players went on strike to protest the deteriorating financial situation. They clarified that the strike was not directed against the administration, fans, or the club itself, but rather to denounce the crisis and delayed resolutions. Players had not been paid for six months, and new recruits had yet to receive any wages. On October 13, 2019, the players escalated their protest by boycotting training and official matches due to continued non-payment of wages. Two days later, Amine Tirmane resigned from his position on Dzaïr TV. In response, a fan donated 500,000 dinars to each player as a reward for recent victories over Gor Mahia and AS Aïn M'lila. The players then agreed to resume training and participated in the October 23 match against CA Bordj Bou Arréridj. Meanwhile, protests intensified. Nearly 5,000 fans gathered on October 19, 2019, in front of the Wilaya of Algiers, demanding the removal of ETRHB Haddad’s control over the club. Minister of Youth and Sports Raouf Salim Bernaoui responded by urging supporters to remain patient.

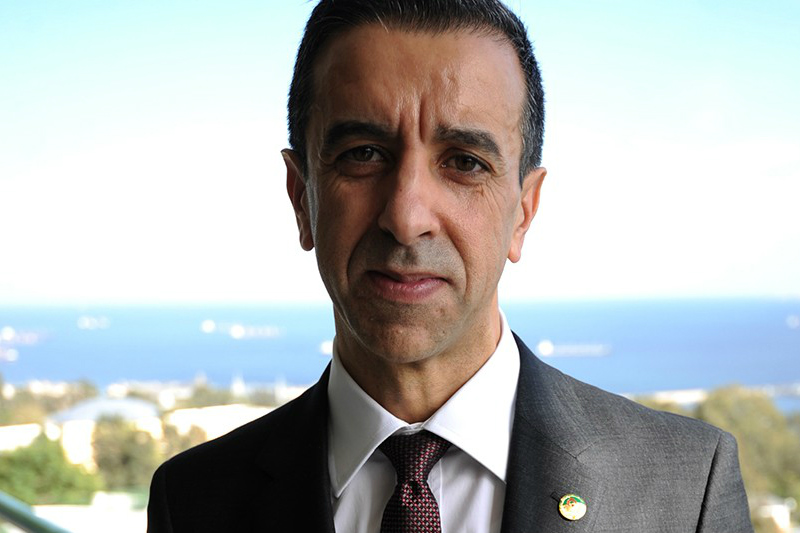
Algerian businessman Ali Haddad owner and president of club USM Alger from 2010 until 2019.

On October 20, 2019, Mounir D’bichi told France 24 that Al-Hayat Petroleum was in fact a subsidiary of ETRHB Haddad. He also disclosed that the club was in debt to the tune of 1 billion dinars (approximately €8 million). According to D’bichi, ETRHB Haddad had injected 400 billion centimes (~€23 million) into the club since its takeover. Despite the crisis, the club continued to make efforts to rebuild. On October 22, 2019, Oussama Chita returned to training after a long absence due to a serious knee injury. On October 29, 2019, USM Alger announced the amicable termination of its sponsorship agreement with Kia Al Djazair, recovering nearly 20 billion centimes (€1.4 million) in outstanding debts. The contract with Ifri was also not renewed by company decision. On November 5, 2019, the club signed a new sponsorship deal with Groupe SERPORT, a company specializing in port services, valued at 16 billion centimes (~€1.2 million).

To protect its interests in the darby legal case, the administration of USM Alger appealed the arbitration ruling issued by the Algerian Court for the Settlement of Sports Disputes (Case No. 92/19) involving the Algerian Football Federation and the Professional Football Association. The Court of Arbitration for Sport (CAS) in Lausanne acknowledged receipt of the appeal on January 8, 2020, and the club paid the €1,000 case registration fee the following morning. In a heartwarming moment during a CAF Champions League group stage match, Wydad Casablanca’s captain Brahim Nekkach presented USM Alger’s goalkeeper Zemmamouche with a 77-year-old letter. The historic document, dating back to 1943, was an invitation from Union Sportive Musulmane Algéroise to Wydad Casablanca to participate in a friendly tournament in Algeria.

=== Legal Battle Over USMA Branding Tied to Former Regime Figures ===
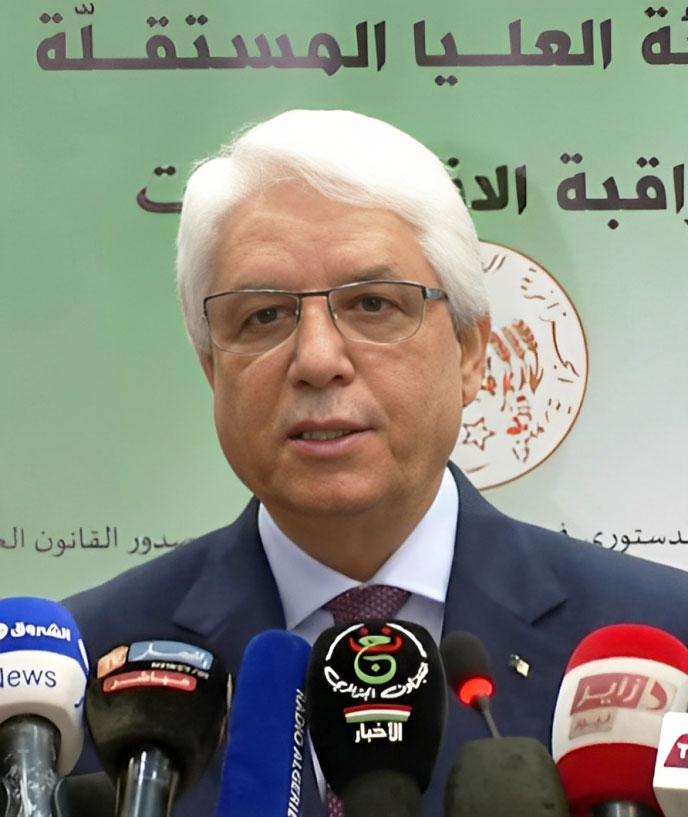
Tayeb Louh Minister of Justice between 2013 & 2019.

On January 27, 2021, Algerian newspaper El Khabar reported that Saïd Allik, the historical president of USM Alger, was justified in his claims that two influential figures from the former Algerian regime interfered in the judiciary to favor his rival, businessman Ali Haddad, in the high-profile “Amateur Club” case. According to the report, Allik was the victim of a conspiracy orchestrated by former minister of Justice Tayeb Louh and his collaborators. At the center of the case is Allik’s accusation that Haddad, who acquired ownership of USM Alger in 2010, exploited the "USMA" slogan and branding elements that were not part of the sale agreement without paying any compensation. Representing the amateur branch of the club, Allik filed a lawsuit seeking 20 billion centimes (2 billion Algerian dinars) in material and moral damages.

In 2017, the Chamber of Commerce of the Algerian Judicial Council ruled in favor of the amateur club and ordered Haddad to pay 2 billion centimes in compensation. However, Haddad refused to accept the decision. Initially, he pursued legal channels for retrial. Later, according to El Khabar’s investigation, he leveraged his political influence, appealing to Minister Louh, who allegedly used the Inspector General of the Ministry of Justice to intervene in the case. Despite these efforts, Haddad encountered fierce resistance from the president of the Chamber of Commerce, a female judge who refused to yield to external pressure. The Chamber itself was eventually recognized as a civil party, following the attempts to manipulate the legal process. In a suspicious move, the judge in question received an official recommendation from the Ministry to attend an international forum, which delayed the ruling in the case. Upon her return, she was removed from her position as head of the Chamber of Commerce and reassigned as a consultant in the Administrative Chamber.

This sequence of events led her to believe that the President of the Judicial Council was acting under pressure from higher authorities. According to El Khabar’s sources, when confronted with the facts, the council president attributed the responsibility to the Inspector General, claiming he was the one who prevented further investigation into the case. He also allegedly ordered the judge’s dismissal and reassignment to the Real Estate Chamber. The disciplinary measures taken against the judge were reportedly carried out under direct instructions from the Inspector General, who now faces serious charges in connection with this case. When questioned about the matter, Saïd Bouteflika, brother of former President Abdelaziz Bouteflika, denied any knowledge of the case or of any judges involved. As for the legal consequences Ali Haddad faces charges of abuse of office and incitement to influence judicial decisions and Louh is charged with obstruction of justice and incitement to misconduct.

== Groupe SERPORT New Owner (2020–) ==
=== Groupe SERPORT's Acquisition and the Challenges Faced by USM Alger ===
After initially being scheduled for March 12, 2020, the General Assembly of Shareholders was brought forward to March 2, particularly following the imprisonment of former club president Rabouh Haddad. The meeting was attended by a representative of ETRHB Haddad but notably absent was amateur club president Saïd Allik. After two and a half hours of deliberation, it was officially announced that Groupe SERPORT had acquired ETRHB Haddad’s 94.34% stake in USM Alger. In a subsequent press conference, Halim Hammoudi, Secretary General of SERPORT, confirmed that the Aïn Benian project and the development of a new club headquarters would soon be underway. He emphasized that the club's ambitions now extended beyond domestic success to include continental titles. Previously, SERPORT's General Manager, Achour Djelloul, stated they intended to invest between 1.2 and 1.3 billion dinars annually, while the training center project alone would cost 1.4 billion dinars. On May 13, 2020, Djelloul announced the signing of former international Antar Yahia as Sporting Director on a three-year contract, along with Abdelghani Haddi as the new General Manager. Yahia revealed he had received offers from France but was drawn to USM Alger’s project, which aligned with his own vision and that of Djelloul.

On July 31, Haddi addressed media reports, dismissing misinformation about the value of the club's shares acquisition. He clarified that SERPORT paid 2 billion dinars (approximately 13 million euros) for the shares. SERPORT, a state-owned holding company overseeing Algeria's port services, reportedly generates annual revenues of around 500 million euros, with net profits between 25 and 40 million euros. However, challenges emerged on July 20, when FIFA banned USM Alger from recruiting new players—Algerian or foreign—for the next three transfer windows due to the club’s failure to pay €200,000 to former player Prince Ibara. The following day, General Manager Haddi responded, addressing both Ibara's case and a similar issue with former player Mohamed Yekhlef, as well as the ongoing derby case. Haddi stated that he had requested the Algerian Football Federation to settle Ibara’s debt using funds from the club’s 2019–20 CAF Champions League prize money.

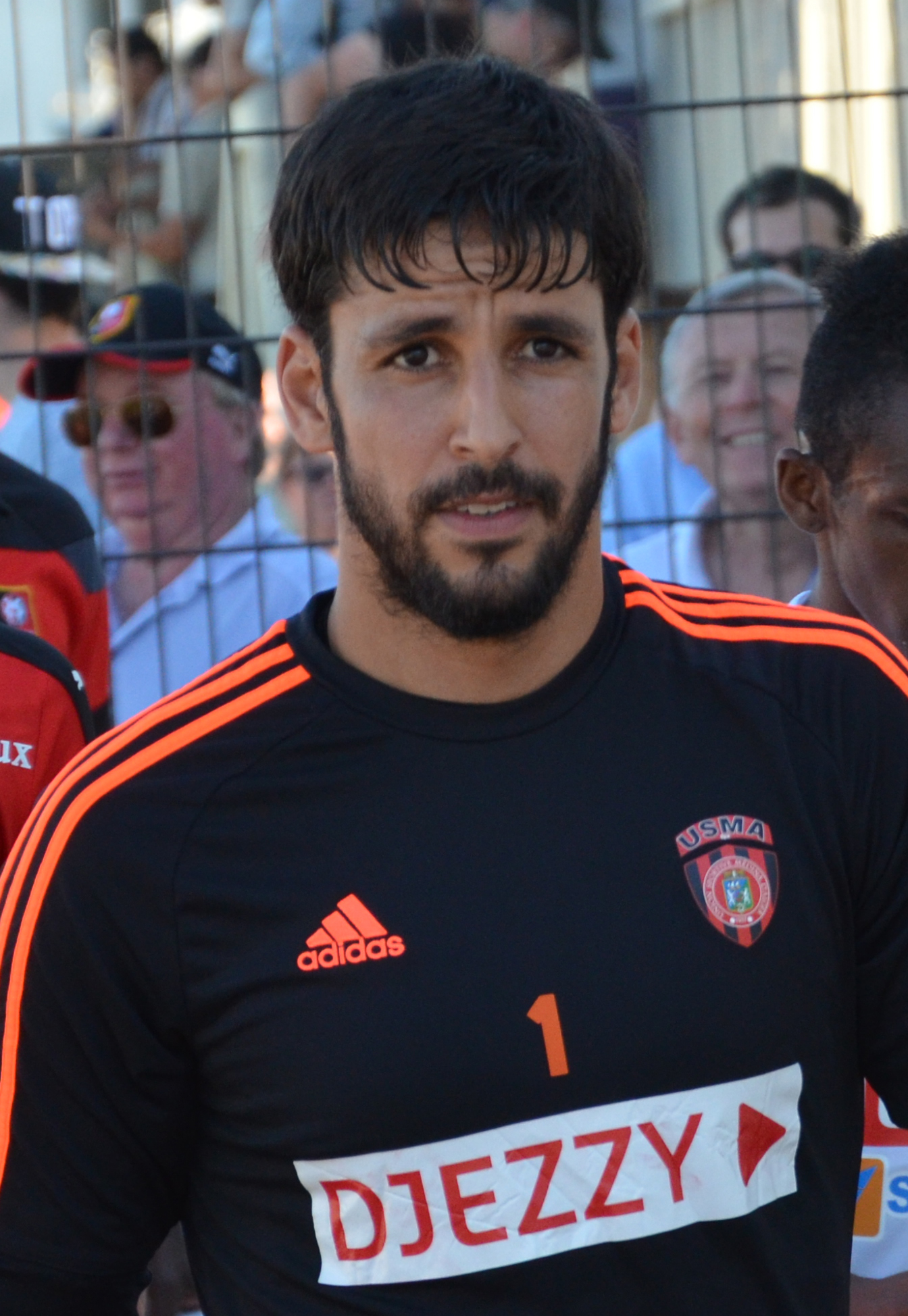
Mohamed Lamine Zemmamouche the first USM Alger player to reach the 400th match.

On August 28, USM Alger won their darby case against the Algerian Football Federation (FAF) and the Ligue de Football Professionnel (LFP), after several delays in reaching a final decision. The ruling restored the three points in question and ordered a replay of the match. Furthermore, both the FAF and LFP were instructed to cover all costs related to the arbitration procedure. On October 30, Groupe SERPORT decided to merge the roles of Sporting Director and General Manager. All powers were granted to Yahia, with CEO Achour Djelloul stating, “We want to avoid mixing things up.” Around the same period, due to the COVID-19 pandemic in Algeria, the Algerian Super Cup faced possible cancellation. On October 4, the Federal Bureau confirmed that the final would be played before the start of the 2020–21 season.

Following a defeat in the Super Cup final, USM Alger dismissed coach François Ciccolini. The dismissal stemmed from his failure to attend the medal ceremony, an action perceived as a sign of disrespect toward official institutions, especially since Prime Minister Abdelaziz Djerad was in attendance. On January 31, 2021, the Société Sportive par Actions (SSPA) and the Club Sportif Amateur (CSA) signed a partnership agreement. The deal aimed to bring both entities into compliance with Algerian law. Under this agreement, the amateur club would receive 30 million dinars annually in return for the rights to use the club’s name and logo. On August 5, 2021, SERPORT decided to relieve Antar Yahia of his duties. Yahia later claimed that his powers had already been removed earlier and that a new sporting director had been chosen some time prior.

During an interview on Channel 3, Achour Djelloul provided insights into the dismissal of Sporting Director Antar Yahia. He emphasized that the matter was fundamentally a relationship between employer and employee. Djelloul also revealed that Yahia had been sanctioned twice by the Disciplinary Committee, leading SERPORT to end its collaboration with him. In the same interview, Djelloul announced that Denis Lavagne would become the new head coach of USM Alger. Soon after, the club appointed former player Hocine Achiou as Sporting Director. Achiou expressed his happiness to return to his “home,” stating his ambition to rebuild the club, restore its prestige, and ensure it competes regularly for titles. He also shared aspirations for USM Alger to eventually have its own stadium. However, Lavagne's tenure was short-lived. On December 24, 2021, USM Alger terminated his contract due to poor results. Following a disappointing run of seven consecutive winless matches, the club also decided to part ways with Sporting Director Hocine Achiou on April 15, 2022.

Amid rumors of Groupe SERPORT’s possible withdrawal from the club, Djelloul reassured supporters on National Radio that the public company remained committed to USM Alger. On May 6, 2022, he criticized those advocating for the return of former club president Saïd Allik, claiming they did not have the club's best interests at heart. He also revealed that the club intended to abandon the position of Sporting Director and had officially requested to use the New Baraki Stadium, citing safety concerns at the aging Omar Hamadi Stadium. However, just days later, Achour Djelloul was dismissed from his position following a scandal involving the unauthorized release of Hyundai car containers imported by the Tahkout company in 2019. He was temporarily replaced by Abdelkarim Harkati, the former CEO of l’Entreprise Portuaire d’Annaba (EPAN). On June 9, 2022 Billel Benhammouda, a promising 24-year-old player for USM Alger and the Algeria A' national team, was given leave for one day by coach Madjid Bougherra. While traveling between Douaouda and Bou Ismaïl, Benhammouda was involved in a fatal car accident alongside a friend. His death was confirmed the following day through DNA testing.

=== Turmoil and Triumph: Resilience Amid Leadership Changes and Controversy ===
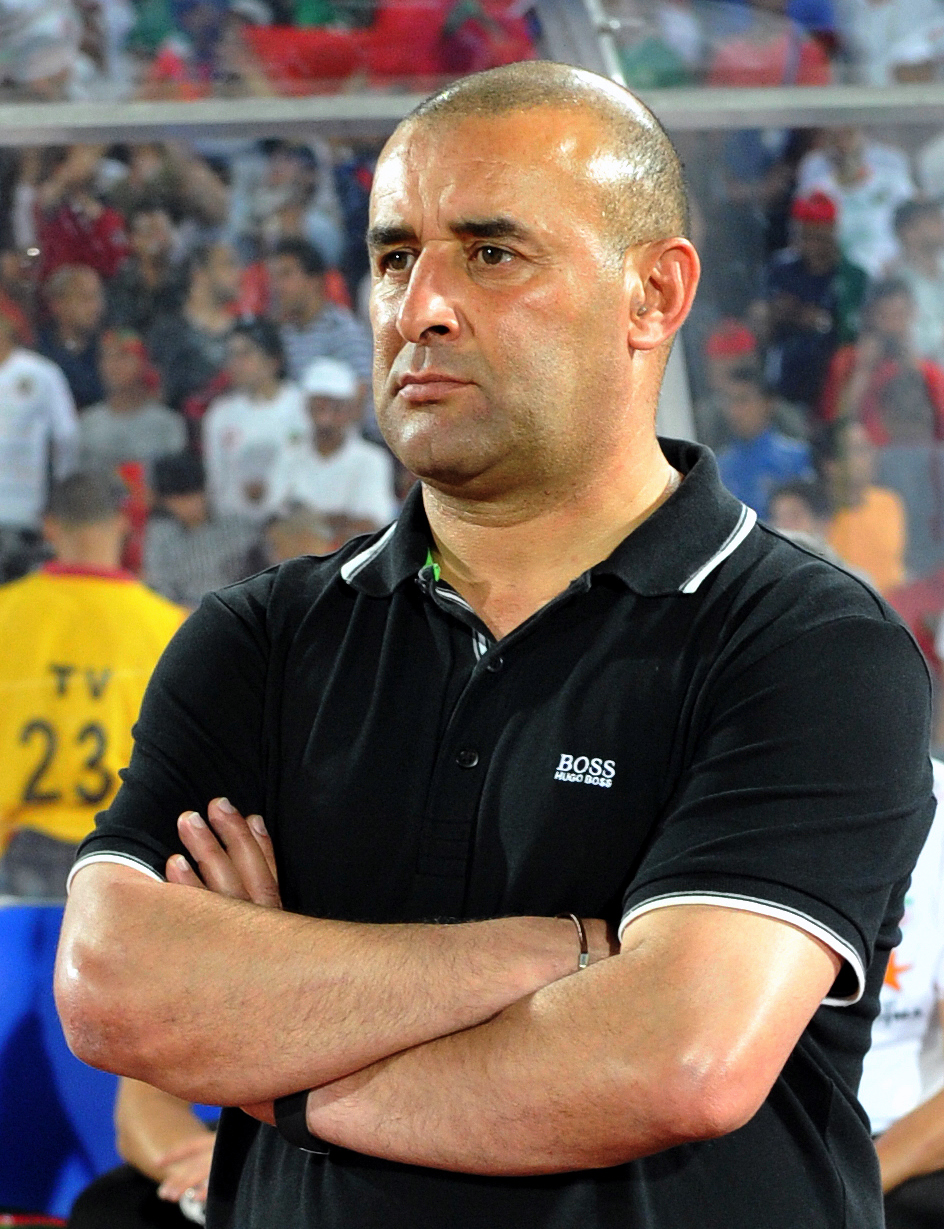
Abdelhak Benchikha leads USM Alger to win the first continental title by winning the 2022–23 CAF Confederation Cup.

On June 26, 2022, Sid Ahmed Arab was officially appointed as the new president of USM Alger, succeeding Achour Djelloul, who was imprisoned earlier that month. Alongside this leadership change, Reda Abdouche was named the club’s new general director, signaling a fresh administrative start for the team. In a move aimed at ensuring continuity, head coach Jamil Benouahi extended his contract by one year on July 6, remaining at the helm for the new season. However, just weeks later, internal tensions surfaced. On August 1, the team was scheduled to depart for a preseason training camp in Antalya, Turkey, but the plans were disrupted. Coach Benouahi, along with several players, refused to travel due to unpaid financial dues and controversy surrounding the exclusion of Mustapha Bouchina and the assistant coach from the travel list.

This internal dispute led to swift disciplinary action. After a hearing before the club's disciplinary board, Benouahi and his technical staff were dismissed from their posts, bringing an abrupt end to their tenure. Further administrative issues surfaced in November, when the club publicly announced the resolution of a long-standing legal dispute with former head coach Denis Lavagne. USM Alger confirmed that it had fulfilled all financial obligations ordered by FIFA, officially closing the case and describing it as a matter of the past. With elimination from the 2022–23 Algerian Cup and a significant gap separating them from the top of the Ligue 1 standings, the club has recalibrated its objectives. President Sid Ahmed Arab stated that winning the CAF Confederation Cup is now the primary goal for the remainder of the season.

On June 3, 2023, under the leadership of coach Abdelhak Benchikha, USM Alger became the first Algerian club to win the CAF Confederation Cup, marking the club's first international title despite a 1–0 home loss in the second leg of the final against Young Africans. Subsequently, on July 16, Benchikha confirmed he would remain with the club despite receiving offers from abroad. On August 7, the club sportif amateur (CSA) filed to register a new logo with INAPI (Institut national algérien de la propriété industrielle), aiming to remove the symbol of Algiers in compliance with a court decision. Saïd Allik, president of the CSA, filed a complaint against the société sportive par actions (SSPA), accusing them of using a “fake” logo. USM Alger then won the CAF Super Cup on their season debut by defeating Al Ahly, securing their second continental title. However, on October 9, Benchikha announced his resignation, initially citing insults received at Omar Hamadi Stadium. He later denied this in a video statement, clarifying that he left for sporting and professional reasons.

On November 21, 2023, Mohamed-Karim Eddine Harkati, CEO of Groupe SERPORT, summoned the senior leadership of USM Alger to address the club's ongoing difficulties and explore potential solutions. Harkati called for a swift turnaround and reaffirmed his confidence in the management team. On January 2, 2024, following internal consultations, USM Alger announced the immediate dismissal of Sports Director Taoufik Korichi, without providing specific reasons. Just two days later, on January 4, Groupe SERPORT, the club’s majority shareholder, implemented significant management changes. During a board of directors meeting, Hacen Hassina was appointed President of the Board, replacing Sid Ahmed Arab. Additionally, Farid Sefar, advisor to the former President, was relieved of his duties. Shortly thereafter, Korichi was reinstated as Sports Director by direct decision of Harkati.

During their campaign to defend the CAF Confederation Cup title, USM Alger faced Moroccan club RS Berkane in the semi-final. Three days before the match, RS Berkane traveled to Algeria. However, a dispute arose regarding the team’s jerseys, which featured a map of Morocco including the contested territory of Western Sahara. This depiction sparked controversy, as Algeria does not recognize Moroccan sovereignty over Western Sahara and had previously severed diplomatic ties with Morocco over this issue. Upon arrival, Algerian customs officials inspected the RS Berkane jerseys and barred the delegation from bringing them into the country. The matter escalated to the Court of Arbitration for Sport (CAS), following a CAF Appeals Jury decision that validated the use of the jerseys due to the Confederation of African Football's lack of response on the issue.

On May 2, 2024, CAS rejected USM Alger’s request for interim relief to suspend the CAF Appeals Jury’s decision, noting that the main case remains under review, with both parties still submitting evidence. On May 10, 2024, CAS again denied a separate request from USM Alger to suspend the Confederation Cup final pending the outcome of arbitration proceedings. CAF General Secretary Véron Mosengo-Omba stated that, in accordance with CAF regulations, the jersey does not pose a regulatory issue. He also emphasized that CAF is awaiting CAS’s final decision, which will serve as guidance for potential updates to its competition rules.

=== USM Alger's Leadership Changes and the Road Ahead Amidst Controversy ===
In the wake of a disappointing 2023–24 season, USM Alger has announced sweeping changes within its management structure, aiming to revitalize the club ahead of the upcoming campaign. The changes come after the team failed to retain its CAF Confederation Cup title and was eliminated in the Semi-finals of the Algerian Cup falling short of key objectives set at the beginning of the season. On May 27, 2024, the club’s leadership held a crucial meeting in which it outlined a new strategy centered on high-quality recruitment during the summer transfer window. This move was seen as a necessary response to growing dissatisfaction among supporters, who had been demanding a comprehensive shake-up of the club’s hierarchy. As part of this strategic reset, the club announced the dismissal of several key figures, General Coordinator, Head of Omar Hamadi Stadium Management and Communications Officer. Additionally, General Manager Taoufik Kourichi submitted his resignation, a move widely interpreted as the result of increasing pressure from fans for structural reform within the club.

In another notable departure, Réda Abdouch, Advisor to the Chairman of the Board of Directors, also resigned. The club stated that Abdouch’s resignation was motivated by personal and health reasons. Amid these departures, USM Alger also began laying the groundwork for a new era of leadership. The club announced the return of Sid Ali Yahiaoui as General Secretary. Yahiaoui, who previously held this position in 2021, is expected to bring institutional continuity and familiarity with the club’s inner workings. The changes culminated on June 22, 2024, when the Board of Directors of USMA-SSPA convened at the headquarters of Groupe SERPORT, the club’s majority shareholder. During this meeting, Athmane Sehbane, who serves as the Chairman of the Board of Directors of USM Alger, was appointed to succeed Kamel Hassena, who had stepped down from his position.

A new chapter has unfolded in the ongoing controversy between USM Alger and Moroccan side RS Berkane, as the Algerian Football Federation (FAF) intensifies its legal challenge over a politically sensitive issue that sparked outrage during the CAF Confederation Cup. On February 24, 2025, shortly after securing a second term as President of the FAF, Walid Sadi made a decisive statement about the contentious case, expressing his determination to see a swift resolution. “This matter must be closed quickly,” Sadi declared, signaling a more proactive approach from Algerian football authorities in defending the interests of its clubs on the continental stage. Just two days later, on February 26, 2025, the Court of Arbitration for Sport (CAS) officially admitted the FAF’s appeal against multiple parties: the Confederation of African Football (CAF), the Royal Moroccan Football Federation (FRMF), and RS Berkane. The appeal contests the CAF’s decision to validate RS Berkane’s match jerseys, which prominently feature a map of Morocco that includes Western Sahara, a disputed territory and a source of deep political tension between Algeria and Morocco.

=== New Era Begins as Saïd Allik Returns ===
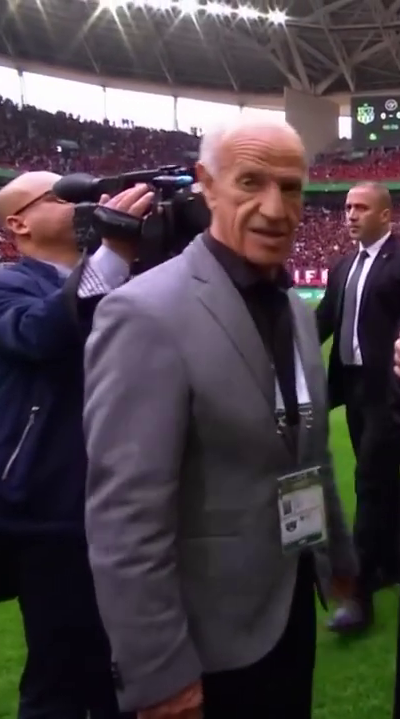
Saïd Allik in the final of the 2025–26 Algerian Cup.

On April 30, 2025, the Algerian Minister of Transport Saïd Sayoud, dismissed Mohamed-Karim Eddine Harkati from his position as CEO of Groupe SERPORT, the official majority shareholder of USM Alger, and appointed Abdelkrim Rezzal as his interim replacement. On May 10, 2025, Athmane Sahbane has officially stepped down as president of the USMA board after less than a year, due to poor management and unmet goals. Boubekeur Abid, an engineer with extensive experience in various sectors, has been appointed as his successor. The club’s owner, facilitated the leadership change through a board meeting.

For the first time since his return, Saïd Allik spoke publicly about the current situation at USMA, the experienced leader acknowledged the scale of the task while remaining optimistic: "It's not easy to take over a club with only five matches left in the season, especially with all the problems there are. But things can change. We need to be patient. I hope that within two years, USMA will come back strong."

USM Alger, under the guidance of Minister of Transport Saïd Sayoud and Groupe SERPORT, appointed Allik as Sporting General Manager on July 17, 2025. Allik, given full authority over recruitment, is tasked with restructuring the sporting sector and reinforcing the club. This strategic move aims to restore the club on solid professional foundations, aligning with its objectives of efficient management.

In the 2024–25 season, USM Alger reached the final of the Algerian Cup for the first time since 2013 and won the title with a 2–0 victory against CR Belouizdad, securing their ninth cup in the competition’s history, confirming a dominant performance in the final and marking an important return to domestic success for the club. In the following season, USM Alger also they continued their strong domestic form and once again reached the Algerian Cup final against the same team, eventually winning 2–1 to claim their tenth title and further extend their record as the most successful club in the competition’s history.

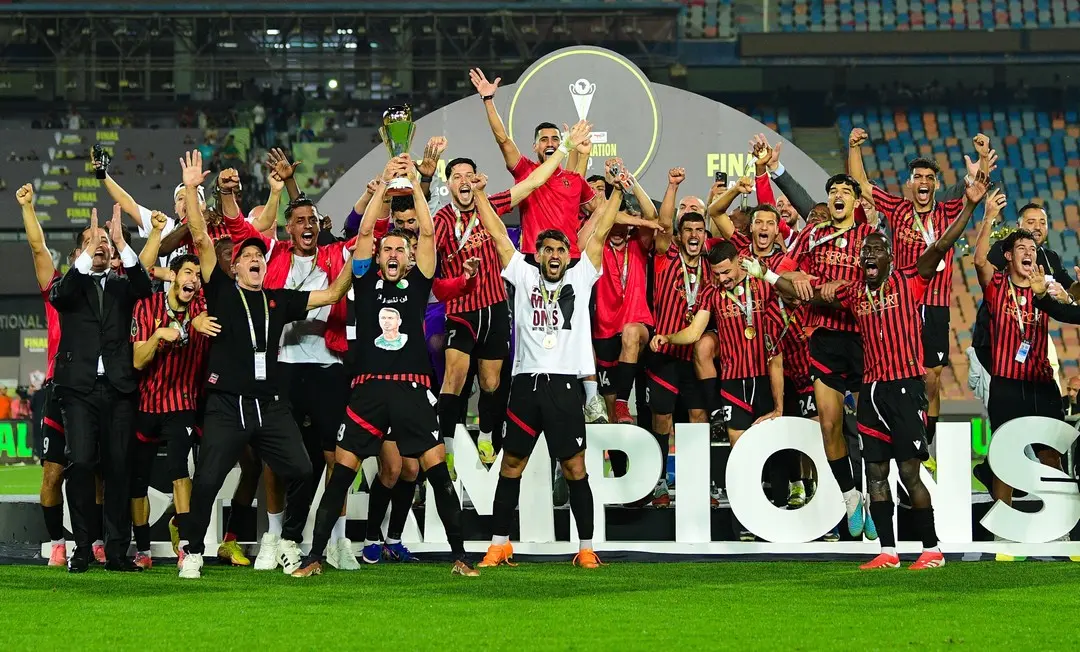
USM Alger are the champions of the 2025–26 CAF Confederation Cup.

The 2026 CAF Confederation Cup final was contested over two legs by USM Alger and Zamalek. In the first leg, played on 9 May 2026, USM Alger recorded a 1–0 home victory. The only goal of the match came from a stoppage-time penalty converted by Ahmed Khaldi. Throughout the game, USM Alger maintained control of possession and managed the tempo effectively through midfield. The second leg, held on 16 May 2026, was a closely fought encounter. After 90 minutes, the aggregate score remained 1–1, sending the final to a penalty shootout. USM Alger showed greater composure in the decisive moment, winning the shootout 8–7 to secure their second CAF Confederation Cup title.

The dispute between Saïd Allik and executive president Billel Nouioua continued to escalate in the weeks that followed. Although the club's Confederation Cup triumph temporarily overshadowed their disagreements, tensions reportedly persisted behind the scenes.. On 24 July 2026, the club's Board of Directors voted to dismiss Allik from his position as sporting director, ending his tenure with USM Alger. On 8 November 2026, USM Alger won the 2026 CAF Super Cup after defeating Mamelodi Sundowns 3–1 in Pretoria, South Africa. The Algerian side's goals were scored by Zakaria Draoui, Saâdi Radouani and Ahmed Khaldi. The victory secured USM Alger's fourth continental title, further consolidating its position among Algeria's most successful clubs in African competitions.
