= List of USM Alger presidents =

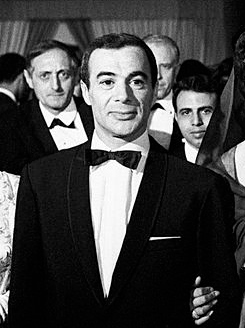
Saadi Yacef club president from, 1972 to 1975 was one of the leaders of Algeria's National Liberation Front during his country's war of independence.

USM Alger is a football club based in Algiers, Algeria that competes in Ligue 1, the most senior football league in Algeria. Since its founding in 1937, the club has had 19 different presidents, And the first president of the club is Ali Zaid. As for the longest period as president was Saïd Allik for 16 years during which he achieved 9 titles.

== History ==
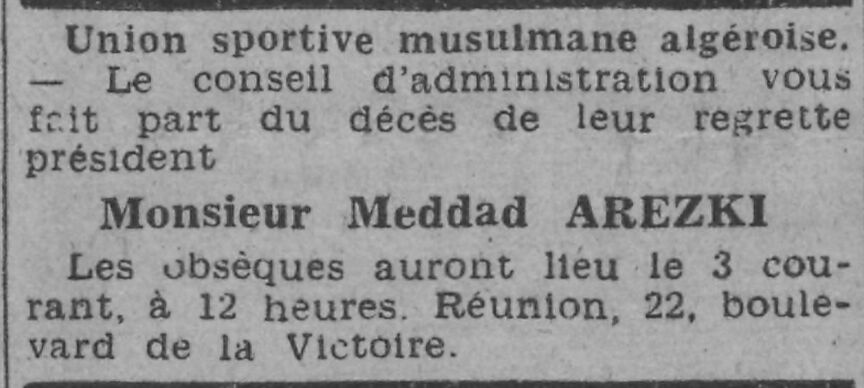
On April 3, 1942 announcing the death of Arezki Meddad in L'Écho d'Alger.

Since its official founding in 1937, USM Alger was led by a succession of presidents and executive members who oversaw the club through its formative years under French colonial rule and during the challenging period of the Second World War. The first executive committee was established shortly after the club’s legal recognition, based on testimonies from early members and the official document submitted to the Governor of the Algiers Department. This founding committee was composed as follows: President: Ali Zaid, Vice Presidents: Bennaceur Lakhdar, Fernane Taieb, General Secretary: Halit Ali, Assistant General Secretary: Ahmed Kemmat, Treasurer: Arezki Meddad. This initial leadership laid the organizational groundwork for the club and managed its early activities during a period of growing political and social tensions in Algeria.

The first president of USM Alger, Ali Zaid, officially assumed his role on 5 July 1937 and remained in office until October 1938. He was succeeded by Arezki Meddad, who took over the presidency in October 1938. Meddad presided over the club during the difficult early years of the Second World War and remained in office until his death while still serving as president in April 1942. The season was further overshadowed by a tragic event: on April 2, 1942, Arezki Meddad, the club’s president, died after contracting typhus, a disease that was spreading widely in the country at the time. His death was a great loss for the club, as he had been USMA’s first honorary president, the first treasurer of the inaugural board, and a key member of the executive council. His funeral was held the following day, attended by many members of the community who came to pay their final respects. Following Meddad’s passing, Abderrahmane Boulendjas was elected on 15 October 1942. His term lasted for one year, ending on 17 October 1943, and he was succeeded by Mohamed Aïchoun, who served from 17 October 1943 until 30 October 1946. Aïchoun led the club during the immediate post war years, a time of renewed activity and reorganization.

=== Saïd Allik era ===
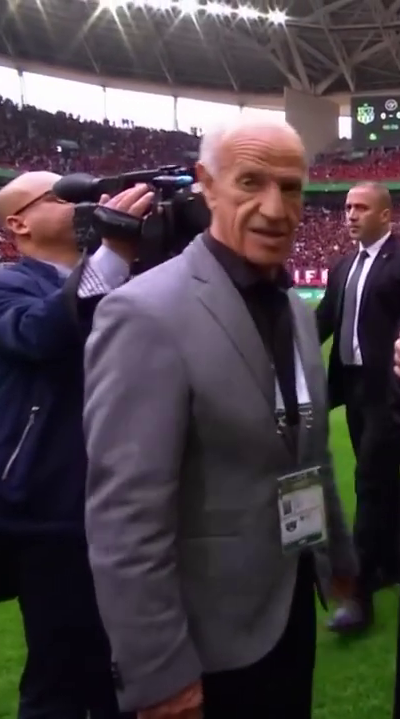
Saïd Allik Club president from 1994 to 2010.

In 1994 Saïd Allik became chairman of the board of directors of USM Alger and promised to return the team to Division 1, On May 26, 1995 USM Alger won against MC Ouargla and achieved a promotion challenge back to the Division 1 after five full seasons, Allik announce that USM Alger has returned to its normal place and will not fall again to the second division, In the first season in Division 1 Allik won the first title in 33 years and the second in USM Alger history. In the following season, Alik signed a contract with the JS Kabylie duo, Tarek Hadj Adlane the former player of Al Ittihad and Mahieddine Meftah the African Cup of Nations champion with Algeria national team and because of it a great enmity began between Allik and Mohand Chérif Hannachi.

In the 1998–99 Algerian Cup Semi-finals against MC Alger, there was a great controversy over the way the game was played, where it was supposed to play from two games, but the Ministry of Youth and Sports decided to play the two games in Stade du 5 Juillet, Saïd Allik refused this insisting that each team plays in his stadium and Stade du 5 Juillet, he was the official stadium of MC Alger, after which the Minister of Youth and Sports Mohamed Aziz Derouaz rejected this request and insisted that he play on Stade du 5 Juillet for security reasons. On the day of the match, USM Alger went to Omar Hamadi Stadium and MC Alger and the referees to Stade du 5 Juillet. Minister of the Interior and Local Authorities at that time Abdelmalek Sellal called Allik to find a solution to this problem, His response was that there were two solutions the first is that each team plays in its stadium Or hold one game in a neutral stadium, and Allik proposes Stade du 19 Mai 1956 in Annaba, but because of the black decade and since both of them are from the capital, it was decided to hold it in Stade du 5 Juillet.

Under the presidency of Saïd Allik, USM Alger won the 2002–03 Algerian Division 1 title, securing the championship on 21 May 2003. The club claimed its fourth league title and second consecutive championship, confirming its dominance in Algerian football. Following the title triumph, an emotional Allik described USM Alger as "a club that reigns supreme in Algeria," dedicating the success after a season marked by personal tragedy. Deeply moved at the end of the match, President Saïd Allik insisted on fully savoring this triumph before thinking about the future: "USMA has once again proven that it has gained maturity and stature. Today, it is a club that reigns supreme in Algeria." He broke down in front of the journalists, still deeply affected by the recent loss of his son, who died in a car accident.

From 2005 to 2010, the worst of Saïd Allik's period, where USM Alger's level declined and did not achieve any title and contented itself with playing the cup final twice against traditional rivals MC Alger and was defeated in both of them, their first final defeat since 1980. It is said that the biggest reason for this decline is the support of Saïd Allik for Ali Benflis in the presidential election against President Abdelaziz Bouteflika at the time. On October 27, 2010, Haddad replaced Saïd Allik as president and owner of the club. Allik had been the club's president for the past 16 years.

=== ETRHB Haddad era ===
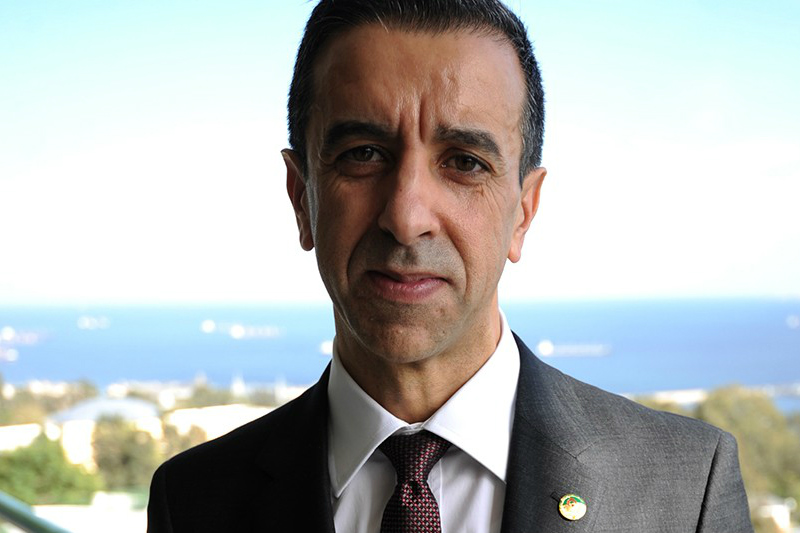
Algerian businessman Ali Haddad owner and president of club USM Alger from 2010 until 2019.

I want to make this club the best in the country. The USMA is a great team and we will naturally have to play to win titles, that's the least. Personally, I will do my best to ensure that the club does not miss anything on a daily basis. We have many projects and we are very keen to achieve them.

— Ali Haddad a statement about his ambitions with the team.

On August 4, 2010, USM Alger went public in conjunction with the professionalization of the domestic league. Algerian businessman Ali Haddad became the majority share owner after investing 700 million Algeria dinars to buy an 83% ownership in the club to become the first professional club in Algeria. On October 27, 2010, Haddad replaced Saïd Allik as president of the club. Allik had been the club's president for the past 18 years, On 28 February 2018 Ali Haddad he changed his brother Rabouh from a post general manager by former international player and former ES Setif president Abdelhakim Serrar. After the outbreak of protests in Algeria and the arrest of club owner Ali Haddad on corruption charges. On April 30, 2019 The board of the SSPA USMA met and noted the vacancy of the post of president of the company since the incarceration of Ali Haddad there is nearly a month. It was Boualem Chendri who was unanimously elected to succeed him while ETRHB Haddad remains the majority shareholder of the club.

=== Groupe SERPORT era ===
On June 2, 2019 it is official, the Haddad family is selling its shares in SSPA USMA which it holds 92%, It was the club's communication officer, Amine Tirmane, who announced it on the Echourouk TV. the reasons that made them make this decision is the imprisonment of club owner Ali Haddad and also freeze all financial accounts of the club. After it was expected that the general assembly of shareholders will be on March 12, 2020 it was submitted to March 2, especially after the imprisonment of the former club president, Rabouh Haddad. The meeting witnessed the attendance of ETRHB Haddad representative and the absence of the amateur club president Saïd Allik, and after two and a half hours, it was announced that Groupe SERPORT had bought the shares of ETRHB Haddad which amounted to 94.34%.

On July 31, 2020 general manager Abdelghani Haddi spoke about some newspapers and responded to them and the fake news about the value of buying USM Alger's shares, where he said that the amount was 2 billion dinars about 13 million euros., for information SERPORT is a holding company which manages the State's holdings in Algerian port services. It generates a turnover of nearly 500 million euros per year, for a net profit which oscillates between 25 and 40 million euros. On September 10, 2021, Saadi Yacef died at the age of 93, who was one of the leaders of Algeria's National Liberation Front during his country's war of independence, president of the club in the 1970s and honorary president. Asked on National Radio about a possible withdrawal from Groupe SERPORT, Achour Djelloul assured that the public company had no intention of separating from USM Alger. On May 12, 2022 Djelloul was dismissed from his post after the scandal of the exit of containers of Hyundai cars imported by the Tahkout company in 2019, and was replaced by the former CEO of l’entreprise portuaire d’annaba (EPAN) Abdelkarim Harkati temporarily.

On January 2, 2024, after consultation between its various members, USM Alger announced that it had terminated the functions of the club's sports manager Taoufik Korichi with immediate effect without specifying the reasons for this decision. However two days later the majority shareholder of SSPA/USMA Groupe SERPORT has made changes at the head of the club’s management, and during the meeting of the board of directors held it was decided to appoint Hacen Hassina new president of the board in place of Sid Ahmed Arab. Furthermore Abdelmadjid Rezkane is the new CEO of SSPA/USMA, while Farid Sefar advisor to the former president of the CA was dismissed from his position. Immediately after that Korichi returned to his position as sports director by decision of Harkati.

On May 27, 2024, USM Alger management decided to conduct high-quality summer recruitment after being eliminated in the Semi-finals of the Algerian Cup and failing to achieve its goal of retaining the CAF Confederation Cup. At the management level, the advisor to the Chairman of the Board of Directors, Réda Abdouch, submitted his resignation, justifying his decision by “personal and health reasons”, indicated the club. Previously USM Alger announced the appointment of Sid Ali Yahiaoui as new general secretary. This is a homecoming for Yahiaoui, who had already held this position in the past with the club in 2021. On June 22, 2024, The Board of Directors of USMA-SSPA met at the headquarters of the Groupe SERPORT, where it was decided to appoint Athmane Sehbane, Chairman of the Board of Directors of USM Alger, to succeed Kamel Hassena who resigned from his position.

==== New Era Begins as Saïd Allik Returns to Take Charge ====
On April 30, 2025, the Algerian Minister of Transport Saïd Sayoud, dismissed Mohamed-Karim Eddine Harkati from his position as CEO of Groupe SERPORT, the official majority shareholder of USM Alger, and appointed Abdelkrim Rezzal as his interim replacement. For the first time since his return, Saïd Allik spoke publicly about the current situation at USMA, the experienced leader acknowledged the scale of the task while remaining optimistic: "It's not easy to take over a club with only five matches left in the season, especially with all the problems there are. But things can change. We need to be patient. I hope that within two years, USMA will come back strong."On 10 May 2025, Boubekeur Abid replaced Athmane Sehbane as chairman of the Board.

As part of the implementation of instructions issued by Saïd Sayoud, Minister of Transport, regarding the management and restructuring of USM Alger, a club affiliated with Groupe SERPORT, the club officially signed a work contract on July 17, 2025, with Saïd Allik, appointing him as Sporting General Manager. This appointment falls within a new strategic approach aimed at reviving the club on professional foundations. Allik has been granted full authority over the recruitment file.

On 27 December 2025, Bilel Nouioua appointed new chairman of the Board replacing resigned Boubekeur Abid. This change is part of a restructuring effort aimed at strengthening governance and improving the administrative and sporting management of the Rouge et Noir.

== List of presidents ==
Name	From	To	Honours (total number)
(France) Ali Zaid	5 July 1937	October 1938	
(France) Arezki Meddad	October 1938	2 April 1942	
(France) Abderrahmene Boulandjas	15 October 1942	17 October 1943	
(France) Mohamed Aïchoun	17 October 1943	30 October 1946	
(France) Mohamed Zenagui	30 October 1946	September 1948	
(France) Mohamed Bensiam	September 1948	1950	
(France) Mohamed Zenagui	1950	10 June 1953	
(France) Ali Chérifi	10 June 1953	11 March 1956	
(Algeria) Saïd Meddad	1962	1963	1 Ligue 1 (1)
(Algeria) Abdelkader Amrani	1963	1971	
(Algeria) Ali Kezal	1971	1972	
(Algeria) Saadi Yacef	1972	1975	
(Algeria) Abdelaziz Tazairt	1975	1976	
(Algeria) Rachid Khelouati	1976	1977	
(Algeria) Saïd Hammo	1977	19??	1 Algerian Cup (1)
(Algeria) Hadji	19??	1984	
(Algeria) Abdesslem Bensahli	1985	1989	1 Algerian Cup (1)
(Algeria) Saïd Hammo	1989	1991	
(Algeria) Rachid Khelouati	1992	1993	
(Algeria) Mouldi Aïssaoui	1993	1994	
(Algeria) Saïd Allik	1994	4 August 2010	4 Ligue 1, 5 Algerian Cup (9)
(Algeria) Ali Haddad	4 August 2010	30 April 2019	3 Ligue 1, 1 Algerian Cup, 2 Super Cup, 1 UAFA Cup (7)
(Algeria) Boualem Chendri	30 April 2019	2 March 2020	
(Algeria) Achour Djelloul	2 March 2020	13 May 2022	
(Algeria) Sid Ahmed Arab	26 June 2022	4 January 2024	1 Confederation Cup, 1 CAF Super Cup (2)
(Algeria) Hacen Hassina	4 January 2024	22 June 2024	
(Algeria) Athmane Sehbane	22 June 2024	10 May 2025	
(Algeria) Boubekeur Abid	10 May 2025	25 December 2025	1 Algerian Cup
(Algeria) Bilel Nouioua	27 December 2025	present	1 Algerian Cup, 1 Confederation Cup (2)
