= Ministry of Interior and local communities (Algeria) =

Government ministry of Algeria

- Ministère de l'Intérieur et des Collectivités locales وزارة الداخلية والجماعات المحلية
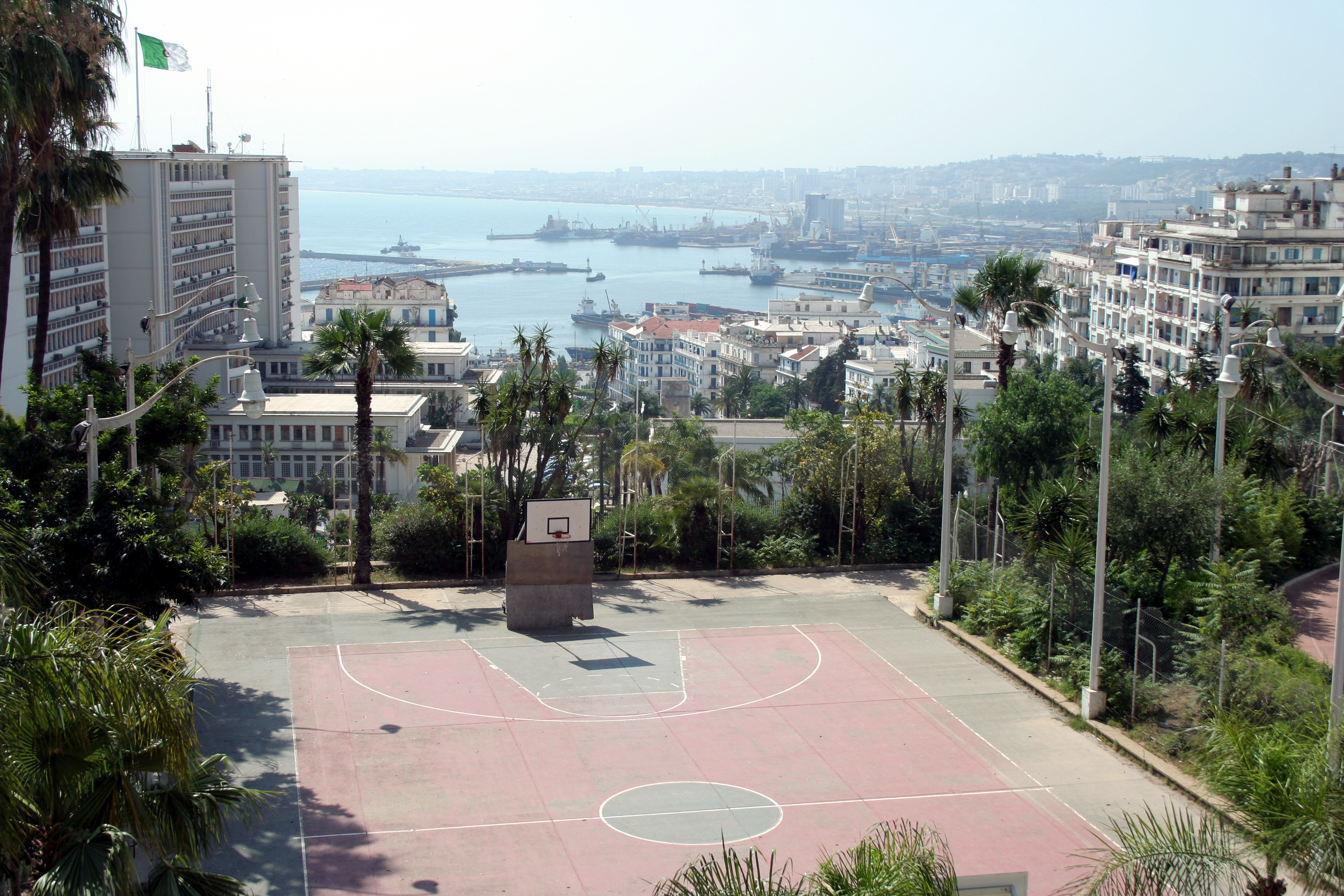

Agency overview
- Jurisdiction: Government of Algeria
- Headquarters: Government Palace, Algiers
- Minister responsible: Saïd Sayoud
- Website: https://interieur.gov.dz/en/

The Ministry of Interior and local communities (Arabic: وزارة الداخلية والجماعات المحلية, romanized: Wizārat al-Dākhiliyyah wa al-Jamāʿāt al-Maḥalliyyah) is the Algerian government ministry responsible for internal security, civil protection, local administration, civil status, elections, and the supervision of Algeria's wilayas and communes. Its headquarters are located at the Government Palace, 1 Dr. Saadane Street, Algiers.

Saïd Sayoud has served as Minister of Interior, Local Authorities and Transport since September 2025.

== See also ==
- Politics of Algeria
