= RS Berkane jersey controversy =

Sporting events

The RS Berkane jersey controversially featured a flag map of Morocco with Western Sahara annexed.

A controversy over RS Berkane's jersey erupted during planned matches between the team and USM Alger during the 2023–24 CAF Confederation Cup knockout stage. The two planned matches were not played because RS Berkane's jerseys included a map of Morocco including Western Sahara—a disputed territory claimed and occupied by Morocco.

On February 26, 2025, the Court of Arbitration for Sport admitted the appeal of the Algerian Football Federation against the Confederation of African Football, the Royal Moroccan Football Federation, and RS Berkane. The following month, the court ruled that the jerseys violated FIFA rules as the map characterizes a message, a demonstration or propaganda of a political nature.

== The issue of Western Sahara ==
Western Sahara is a non-self-governing territory, of which 75–80% is under Moroccan military occupation. The issue of Western Sahara has caused a deep-seated antagonism and general mistrust between Algeria and Morocco that has permeated all aspects of Algeria–Morocco relations. Spain administered the territory as Spanish Sahara until 1976; when it announced its intention to abandon the territory in 1975, relations between Morocco and Algeria, both of which had previously presented a united front, disintegrated.

Algeria, although not asserting any territorial claims of its own, was averse to the absorption of the territory by any of its neighbors and supported the Polisario Front's wish to create an independent nation in the territory. Before the Spanish evacuation, the Spanish government had agreed to divide the territory, transferring the majority of the land to Morocco and the remainder to Mauritania. This agreement violated a United Nations (UN) resolution that declared all historical claims by Mauritania or Morocco to be insufficient to justify territorial absorption and drew heavy criticism from Algeria.

== Algiers match ==
In this regard, we request the Algerian Football Federation to take all necessary measures to facilitate the release of the equipment in question from customs on an urgent basis in order to avoid disrupting the organizational aspects of the match.

— Emad Chenouda responsible for CAF competitions.

Three days before the match, RS Berkane traveled to Algeria, where they were allowed to take a direct flight from Berkane to Algiers instead of passing through Tunisia (while Algerian skies were closed to flights from Morocco). RS Berkane's jerseys showed the map of Morocco, including the claimed Western Sahara. Upon arrival, Algerian customs seized these jerseys and did not allow the delegation to take them. The Berkane players refused to play with the jackets provided by the Algerian Federation and without their "official" jerseys. Despite their presence at Stade du 5 Juillet, the Moroccan team refused to go onto the field. The game was ultimately cancelled.

The president of the Moroccan club Hakim Benabdellah told CAF officials that there is no match without the jerseys including the map of Morocco. After the Confederation of African Football (CAF) interclub relations manager issued a letter to intervene, the USM Alger lodged an appeal via the Algerian Football Federation (FAF) to the CAF jury. However, the jury delivered a negative response. FAF president Walid Sadi announced that he intended to bring the matter before the Court of Arbitration for Sport, stating "Our position is clear, we will not back down and we are ready for anything".

The CAF indicated that the matter will be brought before the competent authorities and apologized for any inconvenience caused to sponsors, TV partners, and supporters. On April 24, the CAF interclub committee met to deliberate on the incident between USM Alger and RS Berkane. They decided to sanction USM Alger with a forfeit of 0–3, and to submit the case to the disciplinary board for possible additional sanctions. The second leg fixture at the Berkane Municipal Stadium on April 28 was not cancelled.

== Berkane match ==
Despite the lingering crisis due to the first leg, USM Alger traveled to Morocco on April 26 aboard a private Egyptian plane on a direct flight. The Algerian Football Federation (FAF) received a new letter from Confederation of African Football (CAF), notifying a rejection of the appeal lodged after the decision to declare USM Algiers forfeited in the first leg. During a pre-match meeting between the leaders of USM Alger and RS Berkane, and representatives of the Algerian and Moroccan football federations, RS Berkane indicated that it planned to wear its jerseys with the map of Morocco with Western Sahara.

USM Alger again refused to play against the Moroccan club still because of its jerseys. The officials waited a quarter of an hour before realizing that one of the two teams had not left the locker room. At this time, RS Berkane players entered the stadium to greet their supporters while USM Alger players left the Stade Municipal de Berkane towards Oujda to make the return trip to Algiers. Before kick-off, RS Berkane supporters brandished a tifo with the map of Morocco showing the disputed territory. The CAF awarded RS Berkane qualification for the final of this competition. The FAF initiated a procedure to appeal the CAF's sanctions before the Court of Arbitration for Sport (CAS), considering that the CAF has "validated the Moroccan club's request to wear a jersey with a political message" during the home and away semi-final. On May 2, the CAF designated RS Berkane as a finalist of the Confederation Cup and transmitted its file on the controversy to its disciplinary committee for possible other sanctions against the FAF.

== Court of Arbitration for Sport ==
FAF & Union Sportive Medina d'Alger v. CAF & Renaissance Sportive Berkane & FRMF
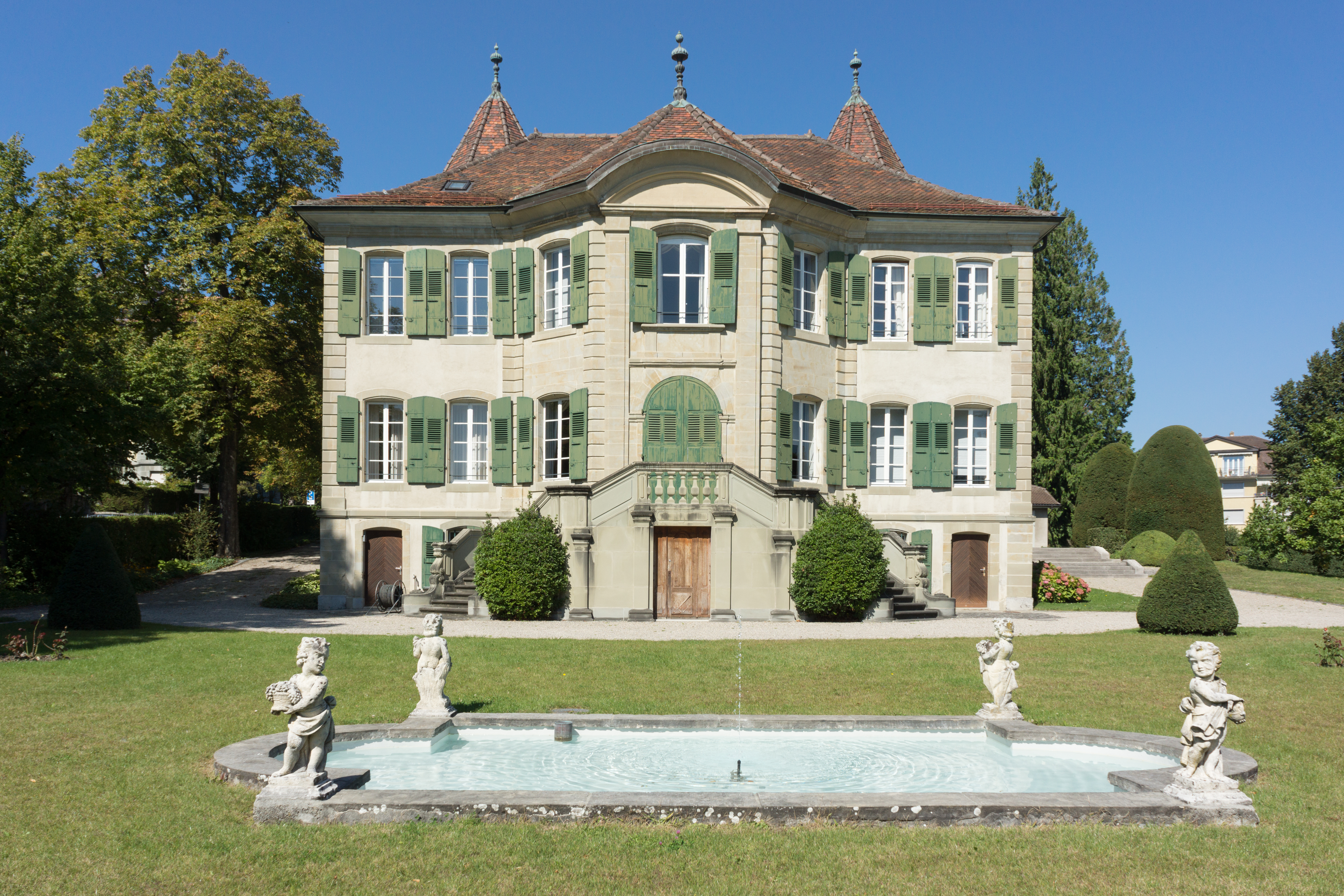
- Court of Arbitration for Sport
- Court: Court of Arbitration for Sport
- Decided: February 26, 2025
- Citation: TAS 2024/A/10528

Holding
- Images asserting sovereignty over internationally contested territories violate regulations against political propaganda.

Ruling
- Appeal allowed

Court membership
- President: Carmen Nuñez-Lagos
- Arbitrators: Philippe Sands; Thomas Clay

In their appeal on the merits, the appellants ask the CAS to annul the CAF decision and to rule that the RS Berkane jersey, which the appellants consider to present a political message, contravenes the Laws on the game, the regulations of the CAF and those of FIFA.

As part of the arbitration proceedings, the parties are in the process of exchanging their written briefs and the arbitral panel which will be responsible for deciding this case is in the process of being appointed. Once constituted, the Arbitral Panel will give instructions for the continuation of the procedure, including the holding of a hearing.

— The Court of Arbitration for Sport communicates with the media.

In accordance with article 48 paragraph 3 of the CAF Statutes, this decision is subject, according to the appeal jury, to appeal to the Court of Arbitration for Sport (CAS) within ten days from notification of the decision. decision and must include all the element documents appearing in point 2 of the directives emanating from the CAS. For its part, the FAF, through its general secretariat, had contacted the General Secretariat of the CAF, on April 14, 2024, regarding the geographical map published on the official website of the African body and which is not consistent with official maps of the United Nations and the African Union (AU) where the Sahrawi Arab Democratic Republic (RASD) and not Western Sahara.

On April 23, 2024, the Algerian Football Federation and USM Alger filed a request with the Court of Arbitration for Sport in Lausanne through a law firm specializing in this type of case. The motion was filed for summary judgment for emergency judgment. A company made up of experienced lawyers has been appointed to defend the Algerian cause. In its complaint USMA highlighted the violations by RS Berkane and CAF of the articles of the statutes and regulations of the latter, including those relating to equipment, namely articles 59 and 60 or even law 4 of the IFAB.

On May 2, the CAS announced that it had rejected the request for interim relief to suspend the decision of the CAF appeal jury which validated the use of the RS Berkane jersey, in the absence of a response from the Confederation of African Football. However, the case remains open on the merits and the court is in the process of collecting the elements of each party. After the Competitions Commission of the Confederation of African Football approved the qualification of RS Berkane for the Confederation Cup final, against the backdrop of a political-judicial conflict which ended in the CAS offices, the Algerian Football Federation is preparing to submit a new request to the CAS, with the aim of temporarily stopping the final scheduled by the Pan-African body in two matches on May 12 and 19. In this regard, the FAF requested that the case be heard by a single judge. This request did not encounter any opposition from the parties concerned, namely CAF, FRMF and RS Berkane.

On May 10, the Lausanne court once again rejected a request from USM Alger to suspend the Confederation Cup final, pending the conclusion of arbitration proceedings with CAF in the RS Berkane affair. CAF general secretary Véron Mosengo-Omba gave an interview to the BBC website. According to reports, Patrice Motsepe appeared to know nothing about the matter, because everything was put on standby, something that Véron confirmed in his interview with the BBC. where he spoke for the first time in public about this complicated affair which seems to be very damaging to senior football officials on the continent. “The CAF Interclub Competitions Committee has considered that, in accordance with CAF regulations, there is no problem with this card", declared Mosengo-Omba, who suggests that CAF is waiting for the CAS to decide and that “the CAS decision will guide us on how to improve our regulations”

On October 11, 2024, the Court of Arbitration for Sport (CAS) set the hearing for November 13, before rendering its final judgment. Indeed, the latter officially put the case on its hearing schedule, more than four months after the submission of the briefs of the parties concerned by the dispute. On November 13, the Algerian Football Federation, USM Alger, RS Berkane, the Royal Moroccan Football Federation and the Confederation of African Football will be heard by the jury of the competent body. On November 13, 2024, the CAS heard the various parties in the so-called jerseys case, namely USM Alger and FAF on one side and RS Berkane, FRMF and CAF on the other. The Spanish judge investigating the case listened to the arguments of the various parties via the Zoom application, the hearing lasted three hours. In the end, the CAS judge left the case under advisement.

On February 26, 2025, The Court of Arbitration for Sport (CAS) has admitted the appeal of the FAF against the CAF, the FRMF and RS Berkane concerning the validation of the RS Berkane jerseys on which appears a map of Morocco including Western Sahara.

The CAS Panel made the following decisions:

- Only the FAF has exhausted the legal avenues prior to the appeal to the CAS; the appeal filed by the USM Alger is therefore inadmissible.
- The image of a territorial map of Morocco, including Western Sahara, on the disputed jerseys conveys a message, a demonstration or propaganda of a political nature, given that this map represents the assertion of a territorial sovereignty that remains to this day contested and still unresolved internationally.
- In application of the CAF Equipment Regulations (article 1.03) in relation to the Laws of the Game of the International Football Association Board (Law No. 4), any equipment – including players’ jerseys – must not convey any content of a political nature.
- In application of the Statutes and the Regulations implementing the Statutes of CAF, CAF is required to respect and implement the duty of political neutrality.

The CAS Panel has concluded that RS Berkane jerseys for the 2023–24 CAF Confederation Cup, insofar as they depict a territorial map including an image of a political nature, were contrary to CAF regulations. CAF's decision to maintain the approval of the jerseys is thus annulled and the FAF's appeal is allowed. This decision has no effect on the results of the 2023–24 CAF Confederation Cup. This document is an unofficial summary for the media. With the agreement of the Parties, the CAS award will be published in French on the website in due course.

Three weeks after announcing its decision to recognize that RS Berkane does not have the right to wear a jersey with a political message, the CAS in Lausanne has published the full ruling, a 38-page document. It can be read in particular that if the procedure took so long it is because of the refusal of the CAF and the Moroccan party that the file be submitted to an accelerated procedure, which could have allowed the USMA to be able to take part in the final of the 2023–24 CAF Confederation Cup in the event of success.

On 3 May 2024, the FRMF and RS Berkane informed the CAS Registry that they opposed the present proceedings being submitted to the expedited procedure and that they requested that the present dispute be submitted to an arbitral panel composed of three arbitrators rather than a single arbitrator. On the same day, the CAF informed the CAS Registry that it also opposed the present proceedings being submitted to the expedited procedure, but that it accepted that the present proceedings be conducted in French. Finally, the CAS criticized CAF for its lack of respect for political neutrality and explained to the Moroccan party that the presence of the disputed card represents an act of political propaganda, which is prohibited by competition regulations.

The image of a territorial map of Morocco on the disputed jerseys which includes Western Sahara characterizes a message, a demonstration or propaganda of a political nature, since this map represents the affirmation of a territorial sovereignty which remains to this day contested and unresolved on the international scene. As a reminder, the CAS jury rejected the request of the FAF and the USMA concerning the procedure against the CAF Appeal Jury, for legal reasons, but it annulled the decision taken by the latter.

On 21 May 2025, CAF sent a letter to the federations informing them of the application of the resolution confirming the ban on all political signs. Furthermore, the confederation recalls that it has no other choice but to apply this, in accordance with article 48 paragraph 6 of the CAF statutes, this decision of the CAS is binding and enforceable for the CAF. Finally, it announces how it will act in the event of a problem from now on.

To ensure the effective implementation of the principle of political neutrality of the CAF recalled by the CAS, we inform you that equipment will, upon notification of this, not be or no longer be authorized for CAF competitions if it contains a message, a card, a slogan or a representation of a political nature. In the event of non-compliance with these requirements, CAF will have the right and duty to prohibit or request the modification of the offending jerseys during its competitions.

— CAF response to the CAS decision.

== Subsequent events ==
The Sahrawi Football Federation has broken its silence regarding the jersey crisis. The Western Sahara Sports Federation described the actions of RS Berkane as a Moroccan maneuver aimed at legitimizing the occupation through sport and achieving political objectives far from the sporting domain. According to Article 50 of the Olympic Charter (paragraph 2), no kind of political, religious or racial demonstration or propaganda is permitted in an Olympic venue, site or other location.

On April 23, 2024, Algeria men's under-17 handball team withdrew from the match against Morocco during the Arab Youth Championship organized in Morocco. The Algerian Handball Federation decided to withdraw after confirming that Morocco would participate with a jersey bearing the map including Western Sahara.

On April 28, 2024, the Algerian Gymnastics Federation officially announced the withdrawal of its national teams, men and women, from the upcoming African Nations Championship, which will be held in Marrakesh, Morocco. According to the press release published on the official page of the relevant sports authority, the Algerian delegation did not obtain the necessary authorizations from the Ministry of Youth and Sports to travel to Morocco. The MJS had decided to freeze Algeria's participation in all sporting events in which Moroccan teams would participate, waiting for the International Olympic Committee to put matters into context and put them into practice. As a reminder, Algeria was to take part in these African artistic gymnastics championships, qualifiers for the Paris 2024 Olympic Games.

The Algerian Olympic Committee officially contacted the International Olympic Committee to denounce the multiple violations committed by Morocco after the RS Berkane affair and what happened during the Arab Under-21 Handball Championship. The request presented by the AOC is essentially based on the provisions of Article 52 of the Olympic Charter, which refers to the prohibition of any practice. political, religious or racist advertising slogan during various sports competitions. The AOC clearly indicated that the Sahrawi Arab Democratic Republic (SADR) is a state in itself recognized by the African Union and that the issue is still pending at the level of the United Nations.

On ON Time Sports channel, Fouzi Lekjaa president of the Royal Moroccan Football Federation and member of the FIFA executive committee, confirmed that he does not intervene in any way in the appointment of referees for Moroccan club matches at the club championship level or for the Moroccan national team through the continental championships through its influence within the CAF. Lekjaa said “If I had been responsible for appointing the referees, the club to which I belong RS Berkane, would have won all the major championships on the African continent”. I have been president of the Royal Moroccan Football Federation for 7 or 8 years. I have never spoken to CAF about the appointment of a referee to direct a match of a Moroccan club or national team. He said that if I had been responsible for appointing referees, the club I belong to, RS Berkane, would have won all the major championships on the African continent, and the Moroccan national team would have also won the Africa Cup of Nations.

During the 74th FIFA Congress in Bangkok, Walid Sadi spoke face to face with Patrice Motsepe, who discussed the issue of the USM Alger and RS Berkane affair at length and in detail. According to media sources, the interview focused on the dispute between the FAF, USM Alger, CAF and RS Berkane and which is currently the subject of CAS arbitration. Sadi protested to the two highest leaders of the umbrella body of African football on the fact that the latter's devices are being misused by a few individuals for their own interests in complete transgression of the months and regulations of football. Referring further to the jersey affair which is the subject of a thorny dispute. Motsepe and his secretary general both recognized an internal error, assuring their interlocutor that an investigation is being carried out internally to determine the responsibilities of each party.

The Arab Free Greco-Roman Wrestling Championship in the under-17 and under-23 categories saw the withdrawal of 5 Algerian wrestlers before facing their Moroccan counterparts after noticing the Moroccan card with Western Sahara. This is the fourth time that Algeria has withdrawn from sports competitions because of Morocco's card, after previous cases in handball, gymnastics and football. While RS Berkane's adventure began in the Confederation Cup during the 2024–25 season, the Moroccan club abandoned the map drawn on its jerseys last season, several media outlets have claimed that RS Berkane had avoided entering into a legal relationship. he is still fighting, in the corridors of the Court of Arbitration for Sport (CAS), like what happened to him last season.

October 8, 2024 The disciplinary jury of the Confederation of African Football (CAF) has delivered its verdict in the USM Alger-RS Berkane case. More than five months later, the disciplinary jury has finally delivered its verdict concerning the famous CAF Confederation Cup semi-finals case, it imposed a financial sanction of $40,000 against the USM Alger club, for non-compliance with the decisions and regulations of the CAF bodies.
