= Mouldi Aïssaoui =

Algerian footballer

Minister of Youth and Sports
- In office 5 January 1996 – 24 June 1997
- Preceded by: Mohamed Laïchoubi
- Succeeded by: Mohamed Aziz Derouaz

Algerian Football Federation
- In office September 1993 – July 1994
- Preceded by: Réda Abdouche
- Succeeded by: Rachid Harraïgue

Personal details
- Born: July 26, 1946 (age 80) Tunis, Tunisia
- Education: Benyoucef Benkhedda University
- Occupation: Footballer; Dental surgery
Association football career
- Position: Midfielder
Senior career*
Years	Team	Apps	(Gls)
1964–1966	JBAC Annaba		
1966–1974	USM Alger		
1974–1978	US Santé		
International career
1969–1971	Algeria	5	(0)
Managerial career
- 1992–1993: USM Alger
- * Club domestic league appearances and goals

Mouldi Aïssaoui (Arabic: مولدي عيساوي, born July 26, 1946) in Tunis, Tunisia, is an Algerian former footballer and former Minister of Youth and Sports, made his football debut in Annaba's second club, the JBAC Annaba. Arrived in Algiers to continue his higher education, he joined USM Alger where he proved to be a very good element in attack. Aïssaoui definitely hangs up under the colors of US Santé to take care only of his Dental surgery's office.

== Personal life ==
Mouldi Aïssaoui coaching career was not great as he trained his former club USM Alger in the 1992–93 season with three coaches: Saïd Allik, Hamoui and Hamid Bernaoui, and in the following season he became the Chairman of the Board of Directors of USM Alger, At the same time he was the president of the Algerian Football Federation. On January 5, 1996, Aïssaoui became Algerian Minister of Youth and Sports in the government of Ahmed Ouyahia. In June of the same year he announced that the Federation and the Algerian Football League were dissolved, and that their leaders were suspended for five years from all sporting activity. Days later Ahmed Ouyahia’s government changed and Aïssaoui was removed from the position of Minister of Youth and Sports and replaced by Mohamed Aziz Derouaz.

On April 29, 2011, Ali Haddad was appointed Mouldi Aïssaoui as General Director of USM Alger. Less than a year after taking office On February 28, 2012 Aïssaoui announced his resignation from his post as general manager of société sportive et commerciale (SSPA) of USM Alger, accusing certain parties in the club of "conspiring" against him. Aïssaoui stated "I had a frank discussion with USMA President Haddad, during which I informed him of my decision to leave my position. He certainly wanted to talk me out of it, but I made him understand that this decision was irrevocable". After the Algeria national football team was eliminated from qualifying for the 2022 FIFA World Cup, FAF president Charaf-Eddine Amara submitted his resignation to declare after that Aïssaoui that Amara does not know anything about football and that he was appointed, and signed by Charaf-Eddine Amara under the powers granted to him, especially Article 39.2 of the Statute of the Federation decisions regarding the temporary suspension of two members of the Federal Office, Mouldi Aïssaoui and Amar Bahloul.

== Club career ==
Mouldi Aïssaoui made his football debut in Annaba's second club, JBAC Annaba Arrived in Algiers to continue his higher education, Aïssaoui joined USM Alger said that at first he was not supposed to play there because he moved to study and JBAC Annaba refused to release him and said that he aspired to a quiet blood ball, but his friend Ahmed Lakhdar Attoui called Mr. Alouache, who convinced me to train with the red and black. He worked with Abdelaziz Ben Tifour as a coach. Leaders would make him eat in the restaurant and not in the university because he was too skinny, Despite the prestigious names within the team Aïssaoui took advantage of his chance in Oran against SCM Oran, where Ben Tifour entered him as a substitute and scored the winning goal and in the next match against AS Aïn M'lila he also scored the winning goal. Aïssaoui definitely hangs up under the colors of US Santé to take care only of his dental surgeon's office.

== International career ==
Mouldi Aïssaoui's career with the Algerian national team was not great as he was satisfied with playing five games, and the first call-up was in the 1970 African Cup qualification against United Arab Republic in a match that ended in defeat with a goal and eliminated the Algerian team from qualifying to the African Cup of Nations after a draw in the second leg. His last match with Algeria was in the 1972 Summer Olympics Qualifiers against Mali on April 11, 1971, and ended in a 2–2 draw.

== Career statistics ==
=== Club ===
Appearances and goals by club, season and competition
Club	Season	League			Cup		Other		Total	
Club	Season	Division	Apps	Goals	Apps	Goals	Apps	Goals	Apps	Goals
USM Alger	1966–67	Nationale II		0			—			
USM Alger	1967–68	Nationale II					—			
USM Alger	1968–69	Nationale II		9			—			
USM Alger	1969–70	Nationale I					2 (Note: All appearance(s) in Maghreb Cup Winners Cup)	0		
USM Alger	1970–71	Nationale I					2	0		
USM Alger	1971–72	Nationale I		7			—			
USM Alger	1972–73	Nationale II	5	5	2	1	—		7	6
USM Alger	1973–74	Nationale II	2	0	0	0	—		2	0
Total							4	0		
Career total							4	0		

== Honours ==
- Algerian Cup runners–up: 1968-69, 1969-70, 1970-71, 1971-72, 1972-73
