= Abdelkader Zoukh =

Algerian politician

Wali of Algiers Province
- In office October 24, 2013 – April 22, 2019
- President: Abdelaziz Bouteflika
- Preceded by: Mohamed Kebir Addou
- Succeeded by: Abdelhalek Sayouda

Wali of Sétif Province
- In office September 30, 2010 – October 24, 2013
- Preceded by: Noureddine Bedoui
- Succeeded by: Mohamed Bouderbali

Wali of M'Sila Province
- In office August 21, 1991 – 1996
- Preceded by: Said Madjid Ouadi
- Succeeded by: Zaccari Tektouf

Personal details
- Born: November 15, 1949 (age 76) Ouargla, French Algeria (now Algeria)
- Party: FLN

Abdelkader Zoukh is a former Algerian politician who served as the wali of Algiers from 2013 to 2019, and also as the wali of M'Sila, Aïn Témouchent, Mostaganem, Oran, and Sétif between 1991 and 2013. Zoukh was dismissed from his post as wali of Algiers due to the Hirak protest movement against the Algerian government that broke out in 2019, and was later sentenced to several years in prison for a variety of corruption cases.

== Biography ==
Zoukh was born in Ouargla, French Algeria on November 15, 1949. He graduated from the National School of Administration in 1982. His first administrative position was as the wali of M'Sila Province between August 21, 1991, and 1996. Between 1996 and August 22, 1999, he served as the wali of Aïn Témouchent, and then as wali of Mostaganem Province from 1999 to August 17, 2004. Between 2004 and August 11, 2005, Zoukh served as the wali of Oran Province, and later as wali of Médéa Province from 2005 to September 30, 2010.

Zoukh was appointed wali of Sétif Province in 2010, and remained in that position until October 24, 2013, when he was appointed the wali of Algiers Province by President Abdelaziz Bouteflika. As wali of Algiers, Zoukh was accused of corruption by various Algerian authorities. Zoukh was dismissed from his post as wali of Algiers on April 22, 2019, two months into the Hirak protest movement against the Bouteflika government. His dismissal was announced just five hours after the collapse of a building in the lower Casbah that killed five people.

Zoukh was referred to the Algerian supreme court for corruption in the aftermath of Hirak on May 26, 2019. On June 6, he was officially retired via a presidential decree, and his position as wali was replaced by Abdelhalek Sayouda. On June 17, he was placed under judicial supervision due to several corruption cases made against him. On December 5, 2020, Zoukh was sentenced to five years in prison due to granting privileges to the family of prominent Algerian general Abdelghani Hamel, and another four years in prison for a similar case involving Mahieddine Tahkout's family. Zoukh was sentenced to another four years in prison on December 29, 2020, due to his abuse of office in favor of Ali Haddad.

In a new trial in December 2021, Zoukh's prison sentence in the case regarding Hamel was reduced to one year, the case involving Haddad was reduced to three years, and the case involving Tahkout was reduced to three years. On May 5, 2022, Zoukh was sentenced to two more years in prison for a corruption case involving Zoukh granting privileges to the company Ennahar. On January 26, 2023, Zoukh was sentenced to three more years in prison and forced to pay a fine of 200,000 Algerian dinars over abusing his office to aid the son of General Belksir.
