= USM Alger Centre d'entraînement et de formation =

Training ground of USM Alger

- Artist's rendering
- Interactive map of USM Alger Centre d'entraînement et de formation
- Location: Aïn Benian; Algiers
- Coordinates: 36°48′11″N 02°55′18″E
- Owner: USM Alger
- Type: Football training ground

Construction
- Groundbreaking: 15 March 2021
- Built: 2021–2023
- Opened: 2026
- Cost: 1,4 billion dinar

Tenant
- USM Alger (training) (2025–)

The USM Alger Centre d'entraînement et de formation is the training ground and academy base of Algerian football club USM Alger. The club is located in Ain Benian in the western suburbs of Algiers.

== Construction ==
The centre covers over 4 hectares (9.9 acres) and includes a natural grass pitch and a synthetic pitch. Its official opening is scheduled for 2022. In July 2011, the club began training center construction. Progress was halted in 2015 due to the priority of improvised housing. The project's lead architect based the design on the plans created by Joan Gamper for FC Barcelona's training center. On October 13, 2018, the first foundation stone was laid and the start of construction was announced in a ceremony organized by the management of USM Alger; the Algerian Minister of Youth and Sport, Mohamed Hattab; and the Wali of Algiers, Abdelkader Zoukh.

The professional training center of USMA covers over 3 hectares. The site offers two football pitches: one with synthetic turf from the last generation and the other with a natural hybrid grass, which is optimal for intensive use. The center will house administrative, educational and catering facilities, as well as accommodations, an official club shop, and relaxation areas. On July 6, 2020, USM Alger singe a two-year contract with Aïn Benian Hotel and Catering School until the completion of the work of the training center, The contract will allow USM Alger to use the stadium, the swimming pool, the weight room, the hotel, the sports hall, the offices and the recovery and massage room.

On March 15, 2021, the construction works of USM Alger's training center were officially launched, central technical director and production Rachid Douh stated that the plot contains 30,000 square meters, and will house the club's headquarters two playgrounds inside the hall two changing rooms and two playgrounds with artificial grass. The works will be carried out by EPE Batimetal. In January 2023, the company in charge of the completion announced the end of the first part of the works, which is the structure of the main building that will be the club's headquarters, and it is the largest in the project. On August 9, 2023 as the buildings took shape, USMA management issued a nationwide tender for the installation of five football fields. It is a large natural grass pitch which will be used mainly for training the first team, three smaller synthetic pitches, as well as two small indoor pitches.

=== Project's resumption ===
The training center project of USM Alger, located in Aïn Benian, was officially launched in 2021 under the supervision of the construction company Cosider and with strategic oversight from Groupe SERPORT. Designed as a long-term infrastructure investment for the club, the project has experienced significant delays due to administrative, technical, and coordination challenges. By late 2024, USM Alger confirmed that construction work had resumed more actively after a period of stagnation during which parts of the site remained inactive or incomplete for over a year. The project is described as being “relaunched” during this phase, although in practice it reflects a continuation of earlier delayed works rather than a completely new start.

In 2025, tensions emerged between USM Alger’s management and the project contractors. In July 2025, the club issued an official warning to Cosider and AVMETAL project supervision, citing serious issues including construction delays, coordination failures, and insufficient resources on site. The club set deadlines and reserved the right to apply contractual penalties if progress did not improve. Despite these disputes, coordination meetings between stakeholders continued. The project director confirmed ongoing regular discussions with club leadership to resolve technical obstacles, while gradual improvements were reported thanks to the efforts of the design and monitoring teams.

By 2026, the project remained under construction but had reached a more stable monitoring phase. On 24 February 2026, Riad Hadjal, CEO of Groupe SERPORT representing, carried out an inspection visit to assess progress at the Aïn Benian site. He was accompanied by USMA officials, representatives of Cosider, and AVMETAL project supervision. The visit focused on accelerating remaining works and resolving technical constraints. Once completed, the facility is expected to cover approximately 3 hectares and include a full professional training complex: pitches, a youth academy, accommodation for 162 trainees (62 residents and 100 externals), 62 rooms with 120 beds, VIP units, a 150-seat restaurant, and several commercial spaces such as a club shop, cafeteria, and fast-food area designed to generate revenue.

== Facilities ==
- Pitch 1: (105 x 68 metres)
- Pitch 2:
- Pitch 3:
- Pitch 4:
