= Dzaïr News =

Algerian satellite television channel

Dzaïr News / دزاير نيوز
- Country: Algeria
- Broadcast area: Europe, Africa, Middle East
- Network: Dzair News
- Headquarters: Hydra, Algiers, Algeria

Programming
- Languages: Arabic, English, French
- Picture format: 576i (4:3 SDTV)

Ownership
- Owner: GMTN
- Sister channels: Dzair TV

History
- Launched: 18 May 2014; 12 years ago
- Closed: 2019; 7 years ago

Links
- Website: dzairnews.net (french)

Arabic version of the channel's logo

Dzaïr News (Arabic: دزاير نيوز) was an Arabic-language satellite television channel broadcasting from Hydra. Dzair News was set up by Algerian businessman Ali Haddad with a number of Arab intellectuals from Algeria and the Arab World.

== History ==
Dzair News was founded on 18 May 2014, and started to broadcast its programs on the same day. It has close down in 2019

== Events ==
Notable events to which Dzair News and its sister channels hold broadcasting rights include:

=== Football ===
- Algerian Ligue Professionnelle 2

== Programs ==
- Beyond the Fact (Arabic: ماوراء الحقيقة)
- The World Today (Arabic: العالم اليوم)
- File and Discussion (Arabic: ملف ونقاش)
- Bearings (Arabic: اتجهات)
- Private Meeting (Arabic: لقاء خاص)
- 100% Sport (Arabic: 100% رياضة)
- Cultural and Faces (Arabic: وجوه ثقافية)
- Eighth Day (Arabic: اليوم الثامن)
- Talk in Politics (Arabic: حديث في السياسة)
- Economia
- Spectra (Arabic: أطياف)
