= Dzaïr TV =

Dzaïr TV – قناة دزاير
- Country: Algeria
- Broadcast area: Europe, Africa, Middle-East
- Network: Dzaïr TV
- Headquarters: hydra, Algiers, Algeria

Programming
- Languages: Arabic and French
- Picture format: 576i (4:3 SDTV)

Ownership
- Owner: GMTN
- Sister channels: Dzaïr News

History
- Launched: 8 May 2013; 13 years ago

Links
- Website: dzairtv (arabic)

Dzaïr TV (Arabic: دزاير تي في) was an Arabic-language satellite television channel broadcasting from Hydra. Dzaïr TV was set up by an Algerian businessman Ali Haddad was a number of Arab intellectuals from Algeria and the Arab World.

== History ==
Dzaïr TV was founded on 8 May 2013, it has started to broadcast its programs on 8 May 2013.

== Events ==
Notable events to which Dzair TV and its sister channels hold broadcasting rights include:

- Algerian Ligue Professionnelle 2
- Algerian Handball Championship
- Algerian Basketball Championship
- Algerian Basketball Cup

== Programs ==
=== Current affairs ===
- Dzaïr Foot Show (دزاير فوت شو; 2017)

=== Series ===
- The Big Bang Theory

=== Cartoons ===
- Adventure Time
- Ben 10
- Chowder
- Kral Şakir
- Eliot Kid
- SpongeBob SquarePants
- Foster's Home for Imaginary Friends
- The Powerpuff Girls
- Teen Titans
- The Marvelous Misadventures of Flapjack
- Tom and Jerry
- Oggy and the Cockroaches

== On-air staff ==
- Meryem Adjal
