= Saïd Allik =

Algerian association football player (born 1948)

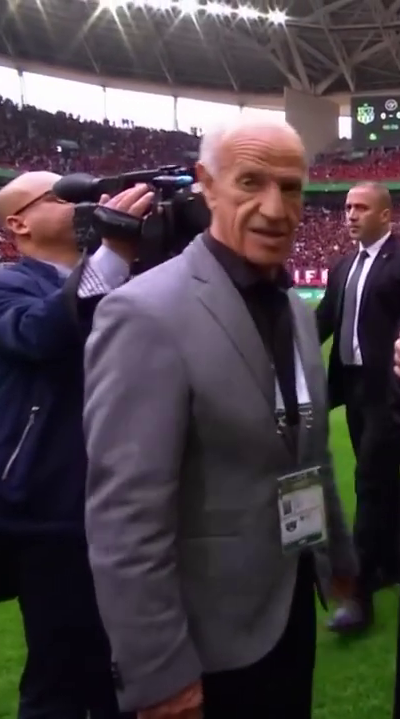
- Saïd Allik in the final of the 2025–26 Algerian Cup

Personal information
- Full name: Saïd Allik
- Date of birth: April 24, 1948 (age 78)
- Place of birth: Birkhadem in Algeria
- Position: Defender

Senior career*
Years	Team	Apps	(Gls)
–	Hydra AC		
–	DNC Alger		
1968–197?	USM Alger		

Managerial career
- 1992–1993: USM Alger
- * Club domestic league appearances and goals

Saïd Allik (born April 24, 1948, in Tixeraïne, Birkhadem in Algeria) is an Algerian footballer turned trainer and then president of the USM Alger. He is appointed President of the Club Cr Belouzdad

Saïd Allik is one of the most influential football executives in Algerian football, best known for his tenure as president of USM Alger from 1994 to 2010. Under his leadership, the club returned to the top flight in 1995 and went on to establish itself as one of Algeria's dominant teams, winning four Algerian league titles and five Algerian Cups, making USMA a national powerhouse throughout the 1990s and 2000s.

Following a period of decline that began in 2005, Allik stepped down as president in 2010 when the club was transformed into a professional sports company. Nevertheless, he remained active in football through the amateur section of the club (CSA USM Alger), where he continued to defend the interests and heritage of the historic club.

He later returned to professional football in other executive roles, most notably as sporting director of CR Belouizdad, where he contributed to the club's stability and positive results. His career is therefore defined by two key phases: an era of exceptional success with USM Alger and his continued role as an influential though often controversial football administrator in Algerian football.

== Biography ==
=== Playing career ===
Said Allik has evolved during his playing career as a defender. He has worn the colors of USM Algiers, Hydra AC and USM El Harrach.

== Management career ==
=== President of USM Alger ===
In 1994 Saïd Allik became chairman of the Board of Directors of USM Alger and promised to return the team to Division 1, On May 26, 1995, USM Alger won away from home against MC Ouargla and achieved a promotion challenge back to the Division 1 after five full seasons, Allik announce that USM Alger has returned to its normal place and will not fall again to the second division, In the first season in Division 1 Allik won the first title in 33 years and the second in USM Alger history. Then, in the following season, Alik signed a contract with the JS Kabylie duo, Tarek Hadj Adlane the former player of Al Ittihad and Mahieddine Meftah the African Cup of Nations champion with Algeria national team and because of it a great enmity began between Allik and Mohand Chérif Hannachi.

In the 1998–99 Algerian Cup Semi-finals against MC Alger, there was a great controversy over the way the game was played, where it was supposed to play from two games, but the Ministry of Youth and Sports decided to play the two games in Stade du 5 Juillet, Saïd Allik refused this insisting that each team plays in his stadium and Stade du 5 Juillet, he was the official stadium of MC Alger, after which the Minister of Youth and Sports Mohamed Aziz Derouaz rejected this request and insisted that he play on Stade du 5 Juillet for security reasons. On the day of the match, USM Alger went to Omar Hamadi Stadium and MC Alger and the referees to Stade du 5 Juillet.

Minister of the Interior and Local Authorities at that time Abdelmalek Sellal called Allik to find a solution to this problem, His response was that there were two solutions the first is that each team plays in its stadium Or hold one game in a neutral stadium, and Allik proposes Stade du 19 Mai 1956 in Annaba, but because of the black decade and since both of them are from the capital, it was decided to hold it in Stade du 5 Juillet. in the 2000–01 Algerian Cup Semi-finals against JSM Skikda at Stade 20 Août 1955, the match is stopped in the 46th minute due to the invasion of the field by JSM Skikda supporters Where was advanced with the goal of Azzedine Rahim, After pressure from the country's higher authorities, Saïd Allik accepted the replay of the match, later the Algerian Football Federation decided to repeat the match in a neutral stadium at Stade des Frères Brakni.

From 2005 to 2010, the worst of Saïd Allik's period, where USM Alger's level declined and did not achieve any title and contented itself with playing the cup final twice against traditional rivals MC Alger and was defeated in both of them, their first final defeat since 1980. Al-Ittihad Most of its players retired or getting old. and continued to rely on them for more than a decade It is said that the biggest reason for this decline is the support of Saïd Allik for Ali Benflis in the presidential election against President Abdelaziz Bouteflika at the time. It was decided by the Ligue de Football Professionnel and the Algerian Football Federation to professionalize the Algerian football championship, starting from the 2010–11 season Thus all the Algerian football clubs which until then enjoyed the status of semi-professional club, will acquire the professional appointment this season. the president of the Algerian Football Federation, Mohamed Raouraoua, has been speaking since his inauguration as the federation's president in Professionalism, promising a new way of management based on rigor and seriousness, especially since football has bottomed out in recent seasons, due to the catastrophic management of the clubs which could not go and were lagging behind clubs in neighboring countries that have made extraordinary progress, becoming full-fledged professional clubs, which will enable them to increase their African continent.

On August 4, 2010, USM Alger went public in conjunction with the professionalization of the domestic league. Algerian businessman Ali Haddad became the majority share owner after investing 700 million Algeria dinars to buy an 83% ownership in the club to become the first professional club in Algeria. On October 27, 2010, Haddad replaced Saïd Allik as president and owner of the club. Allik had been the club's president for the past 16 years.

==== Honours ====
Algerian Ligue Professionnelle 1

- Winners (4): 1995–96, 2001–02, 2002–03, 2004–05
- Runners-up (4): 1997–98, 2000–01, 2003–04, 2005–06

Algerian Cup

- Winners (5): 1996–97, 1998–99, 2000–01, 2002–03, 2003–04
- Runners-up (2): 2005–06, 2006–07

=== President of the CSA USM Alger ===
On January 27, 2021, The Algerian newspaper El Khabar, wrote that the historical president of USM Alger, Saïd Allik was not mistaken when he accused two influential men in the previous authority of interfering with the judiciary in favor of his opponent, businessman Ali Haddad, in what is known as the “Amateur Club” case, considering that he was subjected to a conspiracy by The former minister of Justice Tayeb Louh and his collaborators, The trial of Louh revealed details of what a female judge in the Algerian Judicial Council was subjected to, who refused to submit to pressure and bear the punishment. In his lawsuit Allik was accusing Haddad who became the owner of the club since 2010 of exploiting the “USMA” slogan, which was not part of the club's sale deal, without paying any consideration which forced the amateur club represented by Allik to seek compensation for material and moral damages worth 20 billion centimes.

On July 4, 2023, the USMA administration strongly denounced in a statement the statements made by the amateur club official in the media Saïd Allik, in which he accuses Groupe SERPORT officials of not respecting justice decisions. The official of the amateur club sued the société sportive par actions of USM Alger in order to remove the symbol of the city of Algiers from the club's logo. It is the symbol that was the subject of ambitions of several capital clubs earlier. Where did justice decide the case in favor of the club sportif amateur (CSA) with a fine of 2 million dinars to the société sportive par actions (SSPA). On the other hand, the USMA administration announced that it is committed to removing Algiers state logo from the new shirt that the players will wear starting next August. Saïd Allik responded to Groupe SERPORT's statements and said that the case is old and dates back to the period of the previous owner ETRHB Haddad, and the justice decision was taken three months ago and that the matter is not related to Algiers's logo, but to the club's logo and colors and paying their dues for using this logo.

On August 7, 2023, the club sportif amateur (CSA) submitted a notice to deposit a new mark to the Institut national algérien de la propriété industrielle (INAPI) to change the club's logo and remove the symbol of the city of Algiers from the logo in accordance with the decision issued by the court, Saïd Allik president of the CSA filed a complaint against société sportive par actions (SSPA) due to the use of a “fake” logo for USM Alger. After the withdrawal of Saïd Allik who decided not to run for a new term, Allik has expressed his desire to pass the torch, providing an opportunity for new faces to take the reins of the club, on September 18, 2024, Djabrouni Fouad a member of the Judo Section, was elected as the new president of the CSA/USMA.

=== Saïd Allik Returns Home: A Reunion with USM Alger ===
On May 12, 2025, Minister of Transport Saïd Sayoud received USM Alger Chairman Boubekeur Abid, accompanied by members of the board, a representative of Groupe SERPORT, and Saïd Allik, in a meeting focused on the club’s future. During the session, the Minister reaffirmed his full support for the club, praising Allik’s deep experience and referencing the golden era he had overseen at USMA. For the first time since his return, Saïd Allik addressed the media, reflecting on the challenges facing the club and his ambitions moving forward: "It's not easy to take over a club with only five matches left in the season, especially with all the problems there are. But things can change. We need to be patient. I hope that within two years, USMA will come back strong."

On July 12, 2025, USM Alger’s board proposed a contract to Saïd Allik as technical director, pending SERPORT’s approval. Following directives from Minister Saïd Sayoud, the club officially appointed Allik as Sporting General Manager on July 17. This move is part of a strategic overhaul to professionalize the club’s structure. Allik brings vast experience and deep knowledge of the team. He was granted full authority over recruitment operations. His role aims to reorganize the sporting sector and ensure efficient management. The club hopes to achieve both short- and long-term success under his leadership.

==== Honours ====
Algerian Cup

- Winners (2): 2024–25, 2025–26

CAF Confederation Cup

- Winners (1): 2025–26

=== CR Belouizdad sport director ===
We agreed with the CEO of MADAR Holding to separate. I leave the club with remorse after having had an extraordinary year where we saved the club and won the cup. I don't understand all these changes at the club. The question remains and only MADAR Holding (the shareholder company) has the answer.

— Saïd Allik in a statement about his resignation.

On November 4, 2018, MADAR Holding Company appointed Saïd Allik as the sporting director of CR Belouizdad, Given his experience Allik was able to end all the problems in the club and ensure that CR Belouizdad remains in Ligue 1 thanks to the financial stability provided by the company. Allik received great criticism from the supporters of USM Alger, the club, which was its president for 16 years and demanded him to resign from the presidency of the amateur club but he refused. With the outbreak of protests in Algeria and the impact of USM Alger after the imprisonment of the club's owner Ali Haddad, the amateur club of USM Alger headed by Saïd Allik, began to intervene to pull the rug out from ETRHB Haddad company, something that the supporters who demanded him to resign from CR Belouizdad did not like in order to interfere in the club's affairs and with the request of the Minister of Youth and Sports not to Combine two positions, Saïd Allik returned to his resignation from the SSPA CR Belouizdad in a recent statement. Allik indicated that he did not understand the latest changes that have been made to the organization chart of the Algerian club in recent months.
