= Walid Sadi =

Algerian businessman, football executive and politician

- وليد صادي
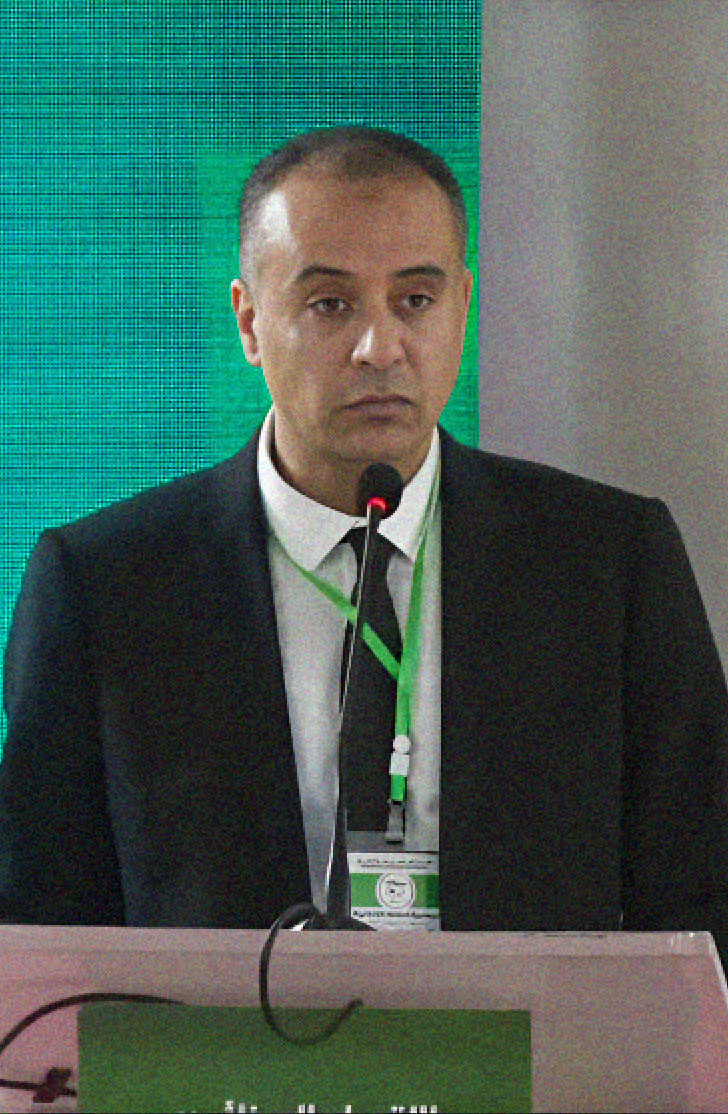
- Sadi in 2023

Minister of Sports
- Incumbent
- Assumed office 19 November 2024
- President: Abdelmadjid Tebboune
- Prime Minister: Nadir Larbaoui; Sifi Ghrieb
- Preceded by: Abderrahmane Hammad

President of the Algerian Football Federation
- Incumbent
- Assumed office 21 September 2023
- President: Abdelmadjid Tebboune
- Prime Minister: Aymen Benabderrahmane; Nadir Larbaoui; Sifi Ghrieb
- Preceded by: Djahid Abdelwahab Zefizef

Personal details
- Born: 25 November 1979 (age 46) El Oued, Algeria
- Occupation: Businessman, football executive, politician

Walid Sadi (Arabic: وليد صادي; born 25 November 1979) is an Algerian businessman, football executive and politician. He has been serving as president of the Algerian Football Federation (FAF) since 2023 and as Minister of Sports since 2024.

== Biography ==
=== Childhood and education ===
Sadi was born on 25 November 1979 in the commune of Hassani Abdelkrim, located in the El Oued Province in southern Algeria. During his childhood, he left his hometown and settled in Sétif, in the eastern part of the country, due to the commercial activities in which his family was involved. He grew up in an affluent family that owns the Sadi Group.

=== Career ===
At the end of July 2021, he announced his candidacy for the presidency after the end of Kheïreddine Zetchi's term. However, he ultimately decided to withdraw, and Charaf Eddine Amara won as the sole candidate.

== See also ==
- Algerian Football Federation
