= Groupe SERPORT =

Algerian government port management company

- Type: Société Anonyme
- Headquarters: Algiers, Algeria
- Area served: Algeria
- Key people: Ali Boulaâras (CEO)
- Owner: Algerian State
- Website: Official website

Groupe SERPORT, GROUPE SERVICES PORTUAIRES, is an Algerian government port management company.

== History ==
On May 13, 2022, The CEO of the port management company (Groupe SERPORT) Achour Djelloul, was dismissed from his post after the scandal of the exit of containers of Hyundai cars imported by the Tahkout company in 2019. a judicial inquiry has been opened into the case of the exit and transfer from the commercial port of Mostaganem, in violation of the law, of 311 containers containing 1,064 disassembled cars, reports the Algeria Press Service citing the prosecution at the Mostaganem court. and replaced by the former CEO of the port company of annaba (EPAN), Abdelkarim Harkati who would have been appointed interim director of serport.

On February 24, 2021, Signing of an agreement for the manufacture of the first marine engine in Algeria between the Algeria Corporate Universities Group (GACU), the Port Services Group (SERPORT), the Constantine Engine Company (EMO) and the General Directorate of Scientific Research and Technological Development (DGRSDT). Under this agreement, the executives and skills of the partner institutions will pool their efforts to "realize the marine engine manufacturing project based on an industrial reproduction strategy with the objective of ensuring the greatest possible integration rate and reduce the import bill. On June 19, 2022 The Minister of Transport, Abdellah Moundji, installed the new general director of the port services group "SERPORT", Mohamed Karim Eddine Harkati. In a statement to the press, following the installation ceremony, which took place during the extraordinary session of the group's General Assembly, the minister specified that "the mission of the new general director, installed after agreement of the President of the Republic Abdelmadjid Tebboune, is clearly defined in a three-year performance contract.

On April 30, 2025, Transport Minister Saïd Sayoud has dismissed Mohamed-Karim Eddine Harkati from his position as CEO of SERPORT, citing ineffective management particularly the continued underutilization of the new maritime station at the Port of Annaba, inaugurated in 2023 and built at a cost of over 4 billion dinars. Harkati replaced by Abdelkrim Rezzal, a former official at the Ministry of Transport, who is expected to revitalize port operations amid plans for new maritime routes and broader sector modernization.

On 9 August 2026, The Groupe SERPORT is undergoing a major change at the top. Its CEO, Ryad Hadjal, was dismissed by the Minister of the Interior, Local Authorities and Transport, Saïd Sayoud, and replaced by Ali Boulaâras, the former CEO of the Port Enterprise of Annaba (EPAN). The ministry expects the new SERPORT CEO to demonstrate rigor, administrative responsibility and stronger coordination among all stakeholders in the logistics chain. The main objectives are to reduce vessel waiting times, eliminate bureaucratic obstacles and lower the foreign-currency costs associated with vessel immobilization.

== Ports operated ==
- Entreprise Portuaire d'ALGER
- Entreprise Portuaire de BÉJAÏA
- Entreprise Portuaire d' ANNABA
- Entreprise Portuaire d'ORAN
- Entreprise portuaire de SKIKDA
- Entreprise Portuaire d'ARZEW
- Entreprise portuaire de GHAZAOUET
- Entreprise portuaire de TÉNÈS
- Entreprise portuaire de DJENDJEN
- Entreprise portuaire de MOSTAGANEM
- Entreprise Portuaire de CHERCHELL
- Société de Gestion des Ports de Pêche

== USM Alger ==
On March 2, 2020, it was announced that Groupe SERPORT had bought the shares of ETRHB Haddad which amounted to 94.34%. in a press conference Halim Hammoudi, Secretary General of SERPORT announced that Aïn Benian project and the club headquarters will be launched soon. He also said that the goal is to achieve continental titles, not only local ones. Previously Achur Djelloul general manager of SERPORT, said they would invest between 1.2 and 1.3 billion dinar per year, while the training center project will cost 1.4 billion dinar.

On May 13, 2020, Achur Djelloul announced that he signed with Antar Yahia to be the new Sporting director for three years and Abdelghani Haddi as a new general manager. On July 31, 2020, Abdelghani Haddi spoke about some newspapers and responded to them and the fake news about the value of buying USM Alger's shares, where he said that the amount was 2 billion dinars about 13 million euros, for information SERPORT is a holding company which manages the State's holdings in Algerian port services. It generates a turnover of nearly 500 million euros per year, for a net profit which oscillates between 25 and 40 million euros.

On March 15, 2021, the construction works of USM Alger's training center were officially launched, central technical director and production Rachid Douh stated that the plot contains 30,000 square meters, and will house the club's headquarters two playgrounds inside the hall two changing rooms and two playgrounds with artificial grass. The works will be carried out by EPE Batimetal, Asked on National Radio about a possible withdrawal from Groupe SERPORT, Achour Djelloul assured that the public company had no intention of separating from USM Alger. After great pressure from supporters demanding a radical change within the club's administrative organization.

On June 22, 2024, The Board of Directors of USMA/SSPA met at the headquarters of the Groupe SERPORT, where it was decided to appoint Athmane Sehbane, Chairman of the Board of Directors of USM Alger, to succeed Kamel Hassena who resigned from his position. Still in the same vein, SERPORT has chosen the former Rouge et Noir player, Hamza Koudri as sports coordinator. The next day, Othmane Sohbane appointed Mustapha Laroussi as secretary of the first team. Laroussi previously held this position in USM Alger.

== Sponsorship ==
On January 7, 2024, the Algerian Football Federation announced the signing of a partnership protocol with Groupe SERPORT. This partnership aims to develop football and support national teams, in a partnership extending from 2024 to 2026.
