= Saïd Sayoud =

Algerian politician

- سعيد سعيود
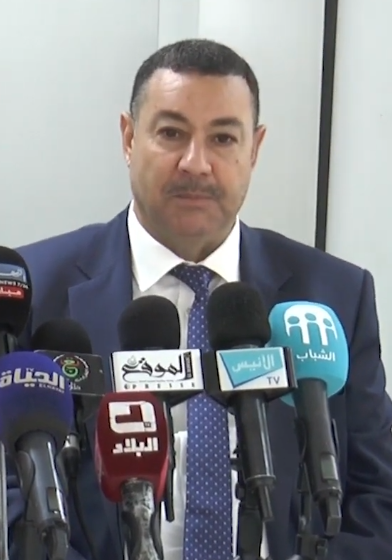
- Sayoud in 2023

Minister of Transport
- Incumbent
- Assumed office 13 October 2026
- President: Abdelmadjid Tebboune
- Prime Minister: Sifi Ghrieb
- Preceded by: Himself
- In office 19 November 2024 – 15 September 2025
- Prime Minister: Nadir Larbaoui; Sifi Ghrieb (Acting)
- Preceded by: Mohamed El Habib Zahana
- Succeeded by: Office merged with the Ministry of Interior

Minister of Interior, Local Authorities and Transport
- In office 15 September 2025 – 13 October 2026
- President: Abdelmadjid Tebboune
- Prime Minister: Sifi Ghrieb
- Preceded by: Brahim Merad (Note: as Minister of Interior, Local Authorities and National Planning)
- Succeeded by: Brahim Merad

Personal details
- Born: January 2, 1969 (age 57) Aïn Kechra, Algeria
- Occupation: Politician

Saïd Sayoud (Arabic: سعيد سعيود; born 2 January 1969) is an Algerian politician who has been serving as Minister of Transport from November 2024 to September 2025, before heading the combined Ministry of Interior, Local Authorities and Transport. Following the separation of the portfolios on 13 October 2026, he returned to the position of Minister of Transport.
