= Ali Haddad =

Algerian businessman

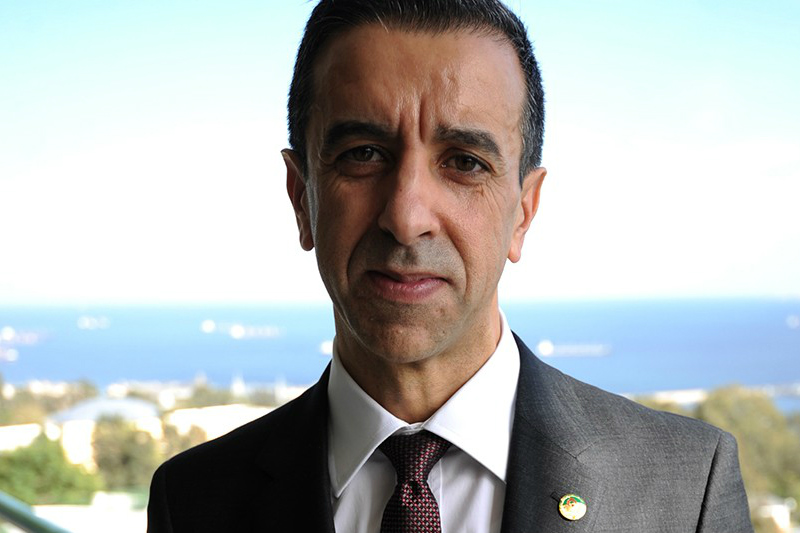

CEO of ETRHB Haddad Group
- Incumbent
- Assumed office 1988

Owner of USM Alger
- In office 4 August 2010 – 2 March 2020
- Preceded by: Saïd Allik
- Succeeded by: Achour Djelloul

President of FCE
- Incumbent
- Assumed office 27 November 2014
- Preceded by: Réda Hamiani

Personal details
- Born: Ali Haddad; 27 January 1965 (age 61) Tizi-ouzou, Algeria
- Education: Mouloud Mammeri University of Tizi-Ouzou
- Occupation: CEO of ETRHB; President of FCE

Ali Haddad, arabic: علي حداد (born 27 January 1965 in Tizi Ouzou) is an Algerian Businessman. He is the co-founder and CEO of ETRHB (Entreprise des Travaux Routiers, Hydrauliques et Bâtiments; Road, Hydraulic and Building Works Company in English), and has been the president of the FCE (Forum des Chefs d'Entreprises; Business Leaders Forum in English) since 2014.

2019 Ali Haddad was arrested while trying to cross into neighbouring Tunisia, local media say.

Ali Haddad was one of the country's richest men and a long-time backer of President Abdelaziz Bouteflika, who was under intense pressure to quit.

Demonstrators had been demanding that Mr Bouteflika and those close to him step aside. According to Forbes, he is one of the richest men in Algeria.

== ETRHB ==
Ali Haddad graduated from the Mouloud Mammeri University of Tizi-Ouzou in 1988. With his five brothers, he founded the Entreprise des Travaux Routiers, Hydrauliques et Bâtiments (ETRHB Haddad Group). In 1993, his company signed its first major deal, a 1-million euro contract to build a highway in Kabylie, Algeria. By 2002, ETRHB was the largest private construction company in Algeria.

In 2003, ETRHB invested in the bitumen sector. In 2006, it launched a new business with Savem Spa, a subsidiary dedicated to automobile distribution. In 2013, Ali Haddad's group created CILFARM, a company specialized in the medical sector.

In 2015, ETRHB had assets estimated at 99 billion dinars (almost 1 billion euros), with Ali Haddad owning 16% of ETRHB.

== USM Alger ==
On August 4, 2010, the Algerian football club USM Alger opened up its capital as part of the professionalization process of the domestic league. Ali Haddad purchased 83% of the club for 700 million dinars ($6.5 million) and became its President.

Since 2010, USM Alger won the following titles:

- 2012-2013: Algerian Cup, Algerian Super Cup, UAFA Club Cup
- 2013-2014: Algerian Ligue Professionnelle 1
- 2015-2016: Algerian Ligue Professionnelle 1, Algerian Super Cup

== Media - Hotels ==
In 1987, a year prior to creating the group ETRHB, Ali Haddad and his brothers opened a sea-front hotel in his hometown Azzefoun, Le Marin. He later expanded the hotel into a resort called Le Marin bis.

In 2009, Ali Haddad launched a press group that publishes two newspapers: Le Temps d’Algérie (in French) and Waqt El Djazaïr (in Arabic). Then in 2013 and 2014, the group launched two TV channels, Dzaïr TV and Dzaïr News.

In 2011, Ali Haddad purchased Barcelona's historic Hotel Palace for 68 million euros. In 2016 with the help of Mr Aouissi Fakhreddine, he acquired two large luxury hotels in Barcelona: the Gran Hotel La Florida and the Hotel Miramar Barcelona.

== FCE ==
On 24 November 2014, Ali Haddad was elected President of the Algerian employers' organization Forum des Chefs d'Entreprises (FCE). The FCE acts as the representative of the Algerian private business sector recognized by the government. As President, he urged to allow the private sector a larger role in the management of the industrial areas and parks to offer more assistance to companies and boost economic development in the country, and to draft regulatory texts to enable more public-private partnerships. The FCE laid out a 2020-2030 plan with the government of Algeria to drive the economic development of the country.

Ali Haddad also has the mission to promote the Algerian economy and its private sector with foreign interlocutors and to foster partnerships. In November 2017, the former U.S State Secretary Rex Tillerson gave Ali Haddad a copy of the Peace and Friendship Treaty signed between Algeria and the United States in 1795. In February 2018, the FCE and France's MEDEF created the Algerian-French Business Council.

During Haddad's mandate as President, the FCE shifts towards becoming a union, the Jil'FCE was created to gather the young business leaders under 40, and the FCE Foundation was created to get involved in social and humanitarian projects.

== Arrest ==
Algerian press reported on 31 March 2019 that Ali Haddad was arrested on the Algeria–Tunisia border during an attempt to escape to Tunisia. He is accused of fraud and many financial crimes including bribery and using the influence of senior members of Bouteflika gouvernement. The Prosecutor General launched investigations into corruption and the illicit transfer of capital abroad.

Similarly, an investigation into corruption against Ali Haddad was, according to the same Channel, entrusted to the research brigade of the National Gendarmerie of Bab J’did, Algiers. It is worth mentioning that Haddad was apprehended in possession of three passports, obtained illegally with the complicity of the Daira of Bir Mourad Rias.

In November 2020, Ali Haddad has had his prison sentence reduced from 18 to 12 years.

== Other tenures ==
- Member of the board of directors of the USA-Algeria Business Council (USABC)

== See also ==
- Economy of Algeria
- Dzaïr TV - Dzaïr News
