= 1963–64 USM Alger season =

USM Alger
1963–64 season
- Chairman: Saïd Meddad
- Head coach: Abdelaziz Ben Tifour
- Stadium: Stade de Saint-Eugène
- Division d'Honneur: 3rd
- Algerian Cup: Semi-finals
- Top goalscorer: League: Abderrahmane Meziani (14 goals); All: Abderrahmane Meziani (19 goals)
Home colours	Away colours

In the 1963–64 season, USM Alger is competing in the Championnat National for the 2nd season, as well as the Algerian Cup. They will be competing in Championnat National, and the Algerian Cup.

== Squad list ==
Players and squad numbers last updated on 1 September 1964.
Note: Flags indicate national team as has been defined under FIFA eligibility rules. Players may hold more than one non-FIFA nationality.

Nat.	Position	Name	Date of Birth (Age)	Signed from
(Algeria)	GK	Djamel El Okbi	15 October 1939 (aged 24)	(France) AS Saint Eugène
(Algeria)	GK	Abderrahmane Boubekeur	9 March 1932 (aged 31)	(Algeria) MC Alger
(Algeria)	DF	Achour Salah		
(Algeria)	DF	Brahim Talbi		
(France)	MF	Freddy Zemmour	21 February 1942 (aged 21)	(France) Gallia d’Alger
(Algeria)	MF	Hacène Djemaâ	6 January 1942 (aged 21)	Youth system
(Algeria)	MF	Ghazi Djermane	21 January 1942 (aged 21)	(France) Gallia d’Alger
(Algeria)	MF	Boubekeur Belbekri	7 January 1942 (aged 21)	(France) Gallia d’Alger
(Algeria)	MF	Lakhdar Guittoun	17 December 1939 (aged 24)	
(Algeria)	MF	Abdelkader Belhaou	21 December 1938 (aged 25)	
(Algeria)	FW	Krimo Rebih	1 May 1932 (aged 31)	(Tunisia) Union sportive tunisienne
(Algeria)	FW	Abderrahmane Meziani	12 May 1942 (aged 21)	(France) AS Saint Eugène
(Algeria)	FW	Hamid Bernaoui	3 December 1937 (aged 26)	Youth system
(Algeria)	LW	Abdelaziz Ben Tifour	25 July 1927 (aged 36)	(France) Monaco
(Algeria)	FW	Amokrane Oualiken	6 April 1933 (aged 30)	(Algeria) MC Alger
(Algeria)	FW	Hocine Bouchache	25 October 1932 (aged 31)	(France) Le Havre AC

== Pre-season ==
At the end of the 1963–64 season, USM Alger takes part in a friendly tournament organized by the LOFA at the Oran municipal stadium at the end of June 1964. In addition to the USMA, the clubs invited to this event are the FC Mellila, Raja Casablanca and a mixed team made up of players from the two local clubs, ASM Oran and MC Oran. The Algerians win the tournament by first beating FC Mellila 5–0 in the semi-final, then Raja Casablanca 2–1 in the final.

June 1964 Friendly	USM Alger (Algeria)	5–0	(Spain) FC Mellila	Oran
		Report		Stadium: stade municipal d'oran

June 1964 Friendly	USM Alger (Algeria)	2–1	(Morocco) Raja Casablanca	Oran
		Report		Stadium: stade municipal d'oran

== Competitions ==
=== Overview ===
Competition	Record								Started round	Final position / round	First match	Last match
Competition	G	W	D	L	GF	GA	GD	Win %	Started round	Final position / round	First match	Last match
Division d'Honneur	30	19	6	5	69	23	+46	63.33	—N/a	3rd	22 September 1963	7 June 1964
Algerian Cup	6	5	0	1	19	4	+15	83.33	4e tour régional	Semi-finals	10 November 1963	28 March 1964
Total	36	24	6	6	88	27	+61	66.67				

=== League table ===
==== Algérois ====
Pos	Team	Pld	W	D	L	GF	GA	GD	Pts	Promotion or qualification
1	NA Hussein Dey	30	19	7	4	72	29	+43	75	Promoted for 1964–65 Championnat National
2	CR Belcourt	30	19	7	4	72	24	+48	75	Promoted for 1964–65 Championnat National
3	USM Alger	30	19	6	5	69	23	+46	74	Promoted for 1964–65 Championnat National
4	USM Blida	30	18	6	6	46	28	+18	72	Promoted for 1964–65 Championnat National
5	MC Alger	30	18	5	7	52	28	+24	71	Qualification to Championnat National play-offs

Source: rsssf.com

==== Results by round ====
Round	1	2	3	4	5	6	7	8	9	10	11	12	13	14	15	16	17	18	19	20	21	22	23	24	25	26	27	28	29	30
Ground	H	H	A	H	A	A	H	A	A	H	H	A	A	H	A	A	A	H	A	H	H	A	H	H	A	A	H	H	A	H
Result	W	W	D	W	D	W	D	W	W	L	D	D	W	W	D	W	W	L	D	W	W	L	L	W	W	W	W	W	W	W
Position																														3

Source: Competitive matches
A = Away; H = Home; W = Win; D = Draw; L = Loss

=== Matches ===
Win Draw Loss

15 September 1963 Round 1	USM Alger	3–0	OM Ruisseau	Bologhine
				Stadium: Stade communal

22 September 1963 Round 2	USM Alger	4–1	USM Maison-Carrée	Bologhine
				Stadium: Stade communal

29 September 1963 Round 3	WA Boufarik	1–1	USM Alger	Boufarik
				Stadium: Stade Mohamed Reggaz

6 October 1963 Round 4	USM Alger	6–0	USM Marengo	Bologhine
				Stadium: Stade communal

13 October 1963 Round 5	NA Hussein Dey	1–1	USM Alger	Hussein Dey
				Stadium: Zioui Brothers Stadium

20 October 1963 Round 6	USM Blida	0–4	USM Alger	Blida
				Stadium: Brakni Brothers Stadium

27 October 1963 Round 7	USM Alger	3–2	JS Kabylie	Bologhine
	Merrad 51' (o.g.); Ben Tifour 69'; Zemmour 90'		60' (pen.) Merrad; 66' Moussa	Stadium: Stade communal

10 November 1963 Round 8	MC Alger	3–0	USM Alger	Bologhine
	Aouadj 50'; Lemoui 62' (pen.); Oucif 70'			Stadium: Stade communal Referee: Chekaimi
Note: Lineup for USM Alger - Boubekeur, Aftouche, Talbi, Zemmour, Salah, Belbekri, Meziani, Benaoui, Rebih Krimo, Oualiken, Bentifour - Coach Abdelaziz Ben Tifour.

17 November 1963 Round 9	JS El Biar	0–0	USM Alger

1 December 1963 Round 10	USM Alger	0–0	AS Orléansville	Bologhine
				Stadium: Stade communal

22 December 1963 Round 11	USM Alger	1–0	CR Belcourt	Bologhine
	Krimo 80'			Stadium: Stade communal

29 December 1963 Round 12	ASPTT Alger	2–4	USM Alger

12 January 1964 Round 13	OM Saint-Eugène	0–0	USM Alger	Bologhine
				Stadium: Stade communal

19 January 1964 Round 14	USM Alger	2–0	S. Guyotville	Bologhine
				Stadium: Stade communal

26 January 1964 Round 15	RC Arbaâ	0–5	USM Alger

2 February 1964 Round 16	OM Ruisseau	3–2	USM Alger	Hamma Annassers
				Stadium: Stade municipal

9 February 1964 Round 17	USM Maison-Carrée	1–1	USM Alger	Maison-Carrée
				Stadium: Stade Lavigerie

16 February 1964 Round 18	USM Alger	2–0	WA Boufarik	Bologhine
				Stadium: Stade communal

1 March 1964 Round 19	USM Marengo	X–X	USM Alger	Marengo
				Stadium: Stade communal Marengo

8 March 1964 Round 20	USM Alger	3–0	NA Hussein Dey	Bologhine
				Stadium: Stade communal

15 March 1964 Round 21	USM Alger	2–3	USM Blida	Bologhine
				Stadium: Stade communal

22 March 1964 Round 22	JS Kabylie	3–1	USM Alger	Tizi Ouzou
	El Kolli 51', 89'; Karamani 88'		16' Oualiken	Stadium: Stade Oukil Ramdane

5 April 1964 Round 23	USM Alger	2–0 (Note: In the second leg and by a decision of the Algerian Football Federation, USM Alger won 2–0 after the Ministry of Youth and Sports suspended MC Alger.)	MC Alger	Bologhine
	Meziani (red card) 37'		Maârouf (red card) 37'	Stadium: Stade communal Referee: Dubourg
Note: Lineup for USM Alger - Boubekeur, Nadji, Talbi, Salah, Zemmour, Belbekri, Hammar, Meziani, Bouchache, Bentifour Abdelaziz, Mekaou - Coach Abdelaziz Ben Tifour.

12 April 1964 Round 24	USM Alger	2–0	JS El Biar	Bologhine
				Stadium: Stade communal

19 April 1964 Round 25	AS Orléansville	0–2	USM Alger	Orléansville

3 May 1964 Round 26	CR Belcourt	1–3	USM Alger	Hamma Annassers
09:00	Lalmas 30'		48' Mekkaoui; 50' Bernaoui; 68' Bouchache	Stadium: Stade municipal Attendance: 0 (close doors)

10 May 1964 Round 27	USM Alger	5–0	ASPTT Alger	Bologhine
				Stadium: Stade communal

17 May 1964 Round 28	USM Alger	4–0	OM Saint-Eugène	Bologhine
				Stadium: Stade communal

24 May 1964 Round 29	S. Guyotville	1–5	USM Alger

31 May 1964 Round 30	USM Alger	3–1	RC Arbaâ	Bologhine
				Stadium: Stade communal

=== Algerian Cup ===
10 November 4 tour régional	USM Alger	7–1	ESM Koléa	Aïn Benian
				Stadium: Stade de Aïn Benian

30 November 5 tour régional	USM Alger	4–0	RC Arbaâ	Hamma Annassers
				Stadium: Stade municipal

22 December 6 tour régional	USM Alger	2–0	AS Orléansville	Saint Eugène
				Stadium: Stade Saint Eugène

12 January Round of 16	USM Alger	2–0	EM Oran	Hamma Annassers
	Bernaoui 32', 50'			Stadium: Stade municipal

22 February Quarter-finals	CA Bordj Bou Arreridj	0–2	USM Alger	Constantine
		Report		Stadium: Stade Turpin

28 March Semi-finals	USM Alger	2–3	ES Sétif	Hamma Annassers
	Krimo 56'; Meziani 59'	Report	Messaoudi II 50'; Khemicha 75'; Mattem II 79'	Stadium: Stade municipal Attendance: 18,000; Referee: Benzellar, Ghanem, Mokhtari

== Squad information ==
=== Goalscorers ===
Includes all competitive matches. The list is sorted alphabetically by surname when total goals are equal.

No.	Nat.	Player	Pos.	Division d'Honneur	Cup	TOTAL
?	(Algeria)	Abderrahmane Meziani	FW	14	5	19
10	(Algeria)	Hamid Bernaoui	FW	13	?	?
9	(Algeria)	Bouchache	FW	9	?	?
9	(Algeria)	Krimo Rebih	FW	8	?	?
Own Goals				0	0	0
Totals				0	0	0
