= 1962–63 USM Alger season =

USM Alger
1962–63 season
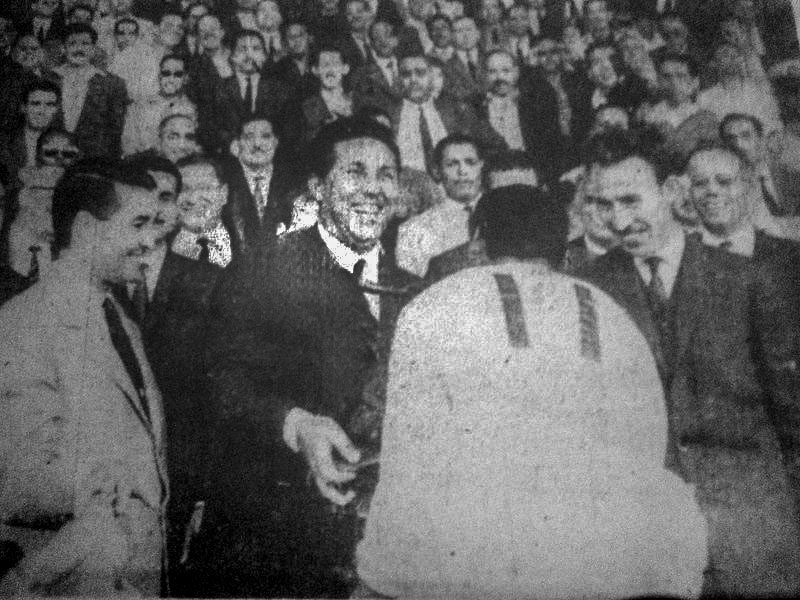
- Ben Tifour, coach of the USM Alger receives from the hands of Ben Bella president, the first trophy Algerian football championship, under the gaze of president of the FAF the Dr Maouche (left) and Minister of Defense Houari Boumedienne (right).
- Chairman: Saïd Meddad
- Head coach: Abdelaziz Ben Tifour
- Stadium: Stade de Saint-Eugène
- Critériums d'Honneur: 1st
- Final Groups: 1st
- Final tournament: Champions
- Algerian Cup: Semi-finals
Home colours	Away colours

In the 1962–63 season, Algiers football club USM Alger competed in the Championnat National for the 1st season, as well as the Algerian Cup.

== Summary season ==
football competitions come to life in the country. Given the geographical distribution of the clubs throughout the country, formerly divided into three departments under the French colonial administration, each league took over the organization of the competitions in an autonomous way, encouraged by the Ministry of Sports and Youth. In the early years, the competitions thus restarted in the form of regional criteria at the end of which were sacred the departmental champions who were then to compete in the form of tournaments "play off" to designate the Champion of Algeria. League beginning with the first post-independence the USM Alger administration to bring the former Nice and Monaco player Abdelaziz Ben Tifour to be a coach and a player at the same time, also included one foreign player Freddy Zemmour from Pied-Noir one of the few French players who have decided to stay in Algeria.

USM Alger took place in Group V and took first place with 51 points and strongest offensive line in each league with 75 goal after the piece and in Algiers League in a group with MC Alger, AS Orléansville, NA Hussein Dey and OM Saint Eugène took first place also with 12 points from 12 to advance to the semi-finals and play against Hamra Annaba previously USM Annaba and won by corners 7–6 qualify for the final of the first tournament in the history of Algeria, and find MC Alger again The Red and Black, led by player-coach Bentifour easily outweigh the score of 3–0 in a match played at the Stade d'El Annasser, in the presence of President Ahmed Ben Bella and Minister of Defense Houari Boumedienne. From here Sostara was honored to be the first club to win the championship title in the era of independence.

== Squad list ==
Players and squad numbers last updated on 1 September 1970.
Note: Flags indicate national team as has been defined under FIFA eligibility rules. Players may hold more than one non-FIFA nationality.

Nat.	Name	Date of birth (age)	Moving from
Goalkeepers
(Algeria)	Djamel El Okbi	15 October 1939 (aged 22)	(France) AS Saint Eugène
Defenders
(Algeria)	Mohamed Madani	23 May 1945 (aged 17)	
(Algeria)	Achour Sallah	1 October 1933 (aged 29)	
(Algeria)	Mohamed Kerkouche		
(Algeria)	Hacène Chabri	25 April 1931 (aged 31)	
(Algeria)	Osman		
(Algeria)	Brahim Talbi		
Midfielders
(Algeria)	Rachid Aftouche	2 November 1933 (aged 28)	(France) Olympique Tizi Ouzou
(Algeria)	Hacène Djemaâ	6 January 1942 (aged 20)	
(Algeria)	Boubekeur Belbekri	7 January 1942 (aged 20)	
(Algeria)	Ghazi Djermane	21 January 1942 (aged 20)	(France) Gallia d’Alger
(France)	Freddy Zemmour	21 February 1942 (aged 20)	(France) Gallia d’Alger
(Algeria)	Hamid Benkanoun		
Forwards
(Algeria)	Hamid Bernaoui	3 December 1937 (aged 24)	Youth system
(Algeria)	Krimo Rebih	1 May 1932 (aged 30)	(Tunisia) Union Sportive Tunisienne
(Algeria)	Abdelaziz Ben Tifour (c)	25 July 1927 (aged 35)	(France) AS Monaco FC
(Algeria)	Abderrahmane Meziani	12 May 1942 (aged 20)	(France) AS Saint Eugène
(Algeria)	Rachid Hemmar		

== Pre-season and friendlies ==
30 September 1962 Friendly	CR Belcourt	1–5	USM Alger	Hamma Annassers
	Raffa 53'		Chabri 5'; Meziani 15', 85'; Rebih 25', 78'	Stadium: Stade municipal Referee: Loubari

10 April 1963 Friendly	USM Alger (Algeria)	1–1	(Spain) Real Madrid	Hamma Annassers
	Krimo (?)		Garcia (?)	Stadium: Stade municipal

=== 1962 Maghreb Football Tournament ===
On 31 October 1962, USM Alger organised an international football tournament at the Stade du 20 Août 1955 in Algiers, as part of the celebrations marking the first anniversary of the outbreak of the Algerian War of Independence. The tournament brought together four clubs from the Maghreb: USM Alger (Algeria), Wydad AC (Morocco), Espérance de Tunis (Tunisia), and Al-Ittihad SC (Libya). The Algerian newspaper Al Chaab covered the event under the headline Le Maghreb uni du foot-ball à Alger (A United Maghreb of Football in Algiers). According to the newspaper, several foreign delegations also attended the event, including the entire Chinese delegation.

== Non-competitive ==
=== Overview ===
Competition	Record								Started round	Final position / round	First match	Last match
Competition	G	W	D	L	GF	GA	GD	Win %	Started round	Final position / round	First match	Last match
Critériums d'Honneur	18	16	1	1	75	6	+69	88.89	—N/a	1st	7 October 1962	7 April 1963
Final Groups	4	4	0	0	15	3	+12	100.00	—N/a	1st	19 May 1963	9 June 1963
Final tournament	2	1	1	0	5	2	+3	50.00	—N/a	Champions	15 June 1963	16 June 1963
Algerian Cup	7	6	0	1	0	0	+0	85.71	2e tour régional	Semi-finals	4 November 1962	31 March 1963
Total	31	27	2	2	95	11	+84	87.10				

=== Critériums d'Honneur ===
==== League table ====
Group V
Pos	Team	Pld	W	D	L	GF	GA	GD	Pts	Promotion or relegation
1	USM Alger	18	16	1	1	75	6	+69	51	Qualification to a final group, promoted for 1963–64 Honor Division
2	USM Marengo	18	10	5	3	40	18	+22	43	Promoted for 1963–64 Honor Division
3	USM Blida	18	10	3	5	57	12	+45	41	Promoted for 1963–64 Honor Division
4	RC Arbaâ	18	10	3	5	46	26	+20	41	Promoted for 1963–64 Honor Division
5	USH Alger	18	8	6	4	28	18	+10	40	Promoted for 1963–64 Pre Honor Division (D2)
6	ESM Koléa	18	7	6	5	31	23	+8	38	Promoted for 1963–64 Pre Honor Division (D2)
7	JS Fort de l'Eau	18	7	4	7	40	24	+16	36	Relegated to 1963–64 First Division (D3)
8	ES Zéralda	18	5	1	12	23	53	−30	29	Relegated to 1963–64 First Division (D3)
9	JSM Alger	18	1	1	16	10	69	−59	21	Relegated to 1963–64 First Division (D3)
10	SO Berrouaghia	18	1	0	17	8	109	−101	20	Relegated to 1963–64 First Division (D3)

Source: rsssf.com

=== Results by round ===
Round	1	2	3	4	5	6	7	8	9	10	11	12	13	14	15	16	17	18
Ground	A	H	A	H	A	H	H	A	H	H	A	H	A	H	A	A	H	A
Result	W	W	D	W	W	W	W	W	W	W	W	W	W	W	L	W	W	W
Position	1	1	1	1	1	1	1	1	1	1	1	1	1	1	1	1	1	1

Source: Competitive matches
A = Away; H = Home; W = Win; D = Draw; L = Loss

=== Matches ===
Win Draw Loss

7 October Round 1	RC Arbaâ	0–6	USM Alger
		Report

14 October Round 2	USM Alger	6–3	USM Blida	Saint-Eugène
	Krimo 5' ? 60'; Bernaoui ? 90'; Meziani ?	Report	15' Mohamed Kassoul ? 85' Mustapha Begga	Stadium: Stade de Saint-Eugène; Referee: benchelha
Note: Lineup for USM Alger - Ostmane, Affetouche, Madaoui, Djemaâ, Salah, Belbekri, Djermane, Matiben, Bernaoui, Meziani, Krimo Rebih.

28 October Round 3	USM Marengo	1–1	USM Alger	Marengo
		Report		Stadium: Stade communal de Marengo

11 November Round 4	USM Alger	3–0	JS Fort-de-l'Eau	Saint-Eugène
		Report		Stadium: Stade de Saint-Eugène

18 November Round 5	ESM Koléa	0–2	USM Alger
		Report

2 December Round 6	USM Alger	5–0	US Hôpital Alger	Saint-Eugène
		Report		Stadium: Stade de Saint-Eugène

9 December Round 7	USM Alger	4–0	ES Zéralda	Saint-Eugène
		Report		Stadium: Stade de Saint-Eugène

23 December Round 8	SO Berrouaghia	0–13	USM Alger
		Report

6 January Round 9	USM Alger	8–0	JSM Alger	Saint-Eugène
		Report		Stadium: Stade de Saint-Eugène

20 January Round 10	USM Alger	3–0	RC Arbaâ	Saint-Eugène
		Report		Stadium: Stade de Saint-Eugène

27 January Round 11	USM Blida	0–1	USM Alger	Blida
		Report		Stadium: Stade Frères Brakni

10 February Round 12	USM Alger	2–0	USM Marengo	Saint-Eugène
		Report		Stadium: Stade de Saint-Eugène

17 February Round 13	JS Fort-de-l'Eau	0–1	USM Alger
		Report

24 February Round 14	USM Alger	4–1	ESM Koléa	Saint-Eugène
		Report		Stadium: Stade de Saint-Eugène

10 March Round 15	US Hôpital Alger	1–0	USM Alger
		Report

17 March Round 16	ES Zéralda	0–7	USM Alger
		Report

24 March Round 17	USM Alger	8–0	SO Berrouaghia	Saint-Eugène
		Report		Stadium: Stade de Saint-Eugène

7 April Round 18	JSM Alger	0–8	USM Alger
		Report

=== Final Groups ===
==== Algiers ====
Pos	Team	Pld	W	D	L	F	A	GD	Pts	Notes
1	USM Alger	4	4	0	0	15	3	+12	12	
2	MC Alger	4	3	0	1	9	2	+8	10	
3	AS Orléansville	4	2	0	2	5	7	-2	8	
4	NA Hussein Dey	4	1	0	3	7	12	-5	6	
5	OM Saint-Eugène	4	0	0	4	3	15	-12	4	

P = Matches played; W = Matches won; D = Matches drawn; L = Matches lost; F = Goals for; A = Goals against; GD = Goal difference; Pts = Points

19 May 2024 Round 1	USM Alger	6–0	NA Hussein Dey	Saint-Eugène
	Belbekri 30'; Ben Tifour 35', 51' (?); Djemaâ (?); Bernaoui (?)			Stadium: Stade de Saint-Eugène

26 May 2024 Round 2	USM Alger	3–2	AS Orléansville
	Ben Tifour (?); Krimo (?); Djermane (?)

2 June 2024 Round 3	USM Alger	4–0	OM Saint-Eugène
	Zemmour 26', 65'; Bernaoui 78'; Djermane 88'

9 June 2024 Round 4	USM Alger	2–1	MC Alger	Hamma Annassers
15:00	Meziani 17'; Krimo 39'		8' Lâagoun	Stadium: Stade municipal Referee: Benzellat
Note: Lineup for USM Alger - El.Okbi, Madani, Salah, Aftouche, Djemaâ, Belbekri, Djermane El Ghazi, Bernaoui, Rebih Krimo, Bentifour Abdelaziz, Meziani.

==== Final tournament ====
14 June 2024 Semi-finals	USM Alger	2–2	USM Annaba (Note: USM Annaba mentioned in this article is a club founded in 1944 now called HAMRA Annaba. Not to be confused with the current USM Annaba, a club based in the same city but founded in 1983.)	Hamma Annassers
15:00	Salah (?); Bernaoui (?)			Stadium: Stade municipal
Note: The semi-final between USM Alger and USM Annaba ended in a 2–2 draw. Since the penalty shootout rule was not yet in force in 1963, the two teams were separated based on the number of corners awarded during the game. USM Alger won the semi-final with 7 corners against 6 for USM Annaba.

16 June 2024 Final	USM Alger	3–0	MC Alger	Hamma Annassers
15:00	Belbekri (penalty missed) 36'; Ben Tifour 60'; Krimo 73'; Bernaoui 89'			Stadium: Stade municipal Attendance: 20.000; Referee: Mezahi, Benjadi
Note: Lineup for USM Alger - El Okbi, Aftouche, Salah, Madani, Djemaâ, Belbekri, Djermane El Ghazi, Zemmour, Rebih Krimo, Bernaoui, Bentifour Abdelaziz.

=== Algerian Cup ===
4 November 2024 2 tour régional	USM Alger	?–?	?	?
		Report		Stadium: ?

25 November 2024 3 tour régional	USM Alger	2–0	SC Affreville	El Affroun
	Krimo (?); Belbekri (?)	Report		Stadium: Stade d'El Affroun

16 December 2024 4 tour régional	USM Alger	3–1	RC Kouba	El Harrach
		Report		Stadium: Stade d'El Harrach

30 December 2024 5 tour régional	USM Alger	2–0	JS El Biar	Hamma Annassers
	Krimo (?); Bernaoui (?)			Stadium: Stade municipal

18 January 2024 Round of 16	USM Alger	2–1	USM Bel-Abbès	?
	Ben Tifour (?); Belbekri (?)	Report		Stadium: ?

3 March 2024 Quarter-finals	USM Alger	3–2 (a.e.t.)	JSM Skikda	?
	Belbekri (?); Meziani (?) (?)	Report		Stadium: ?

31 March 2024 Semi-finals	ES Sétif	4–2 (a.e.t.)	USM Alger	Constantine
	Kharchi 79'; Khemicha 90', 96'; Koussim 106'	Report	11' Meziani; 23' Bernaoui	Stadium: Stade Turpin

== Squad information ==
=== Goalscorers ===
Includes all competitive matches. The list is sorted alphabetically by surname when total goals are equal.

Nat.	Player	Pos.	CH	Final tournament	AC	TOTAL
(Algeria)	Krimo Rebih	FW	11	3	2	16
(Algeria)	Abderrahmane Meziani	FW	10	1	3	14
(Algeria)	Hamid Bernaoui	FW	7	4	2	13
(Algeria)	Abdelaziz Ben Tifour	FW	1	5	1	7
(Algeria)	Boubekeur Belbekri	MF	0	1	3	4
(Algeria)	Ghazi Djermane	MF	2	2	0	4
(Algeria)	Noureddine Matiben	?	3	0	0	3
(Algeria)	Freddy Zemmour	MF	0	2	0	2
(Algeria)	Hacène Djemaâ	DF	0	1	0	1
(Algeria)	Achour Salah	DF	0	1	0	1
(Algeria)	Hammar	?	1	0	0	1
Own Goals			0	0	0	0
Totals			35+40	20	11+3	66+43
