= 1964–65 USM Alger season =

USM Alger
1964–65 season
- Chairman: Abdelkader Amrani
- Head coach: Abdelaziz Ben Tifour
- Stadium: Stade de Saint-Eugène
- Division d'Honneur: 16th
- Algerian Cup: 6e tour régional
- Top goalscorer: League: Abderrahmane Meziani (11 goals); All: Abderrahmane Meziani (11 goals)
Home colours	Away colours

In the 1964–65 season, USM Alger is competing in the Championnat National for the 3rd season, as well as the Algerian Cup. They will be competing in Championnat National, and the Algerian Cup.

== Squad list ==
Players and squad numbers last updated on 1 September 1964.
Note: Flags indicate national team as has been defined under FIFA eligibility rules. Players may hold more than one non-FIFA nationality.

Nat.	Position	Name	Date of Birth (Age)	Signed from
(Algeria)	GK	Djamel El Okbi	15 October 1939 (aged 25)	(France) AS Saint Eugène
(Algeria)	DF	Achour Salah	1 October 1933 (aged 31)	
(Algeria)	DF	Brahim Talbi		
(France)	MF	Freddy Zemmour	21 February 1942 (aged 22)	(France) Gallia d’Alger
(Algeria)	MF	Ghazi Djermane	21 January 1942 (aged 22)	(France) Gallia d’Alger
(Algeria)	MF	Boubekeur Belbekri	7 January 1942 (aged 22)	(France) Gallia d’Alger
(Algeria)	MF	Lakhdar Guittoun	17 December 1939 (aged 25)	
(Algeria)	MF	Abdelkader Belhaou	21 December 1938 (aged 26)	
(Algeria)	FW	Krimo Rebih	1 May 1932 (aged 32)	(Tunisia) Union sportive tunisienne
(Algeria)	FW	Abderrahmane Meziani	12 May 1942 (aged 22)	(France) AS Saint Eugène
(Algeria)	FW	Hamid Bernaoui	3 December 1937 (aged 27)	Youth system
(Algeria)	FW	Abdelaziz Ben Tifour	25 July 1927 (aged 37)	(France) Monaco
(Algeria)	FW	Amokrane Oualiken	6 April 1933 (aged 31)	(Algeria) MC Alger

== Competitions ==
=== Overview ===
Competition	Record								Started round	Final position / round	First match	Last match
Competition	G	W	D	L	GF	GA	GD	Win %	Started round	Final position / round	First match	Last match
Division Nationale	30	8	8	14	36	44	−8	26.67	—N/a	16th	13 September 1964	3 July 1965
Algerian Cup	1	0	0	1	2	3	−1	0.00	6e tour régional		22 November 1964	
Total	31	8	8	15	38	47	−9	25.81				

=== Division Nationale ===
==== League table ====
Pos	Team	Pld	W	D	L	GF	GA	GD	Pts
12	USM Annaba	30	11	4	15	44	44	0	56
13	MO Constantine	30	9	8	13	34	51	−17	56
14	USM Alger	30	8	8	14	35	44	−9	54
15	MC Alger	30	8	8	14	39	46	−7	54
16	JSM Tiaret	30	7	10	13	30	39	−9	54

Source: rsssf.com

=== Results by round ===
Round	1	2	3	4	5	6	7	8	9	10	11	12	13	14	15	16	17	18	19	20	21	22	23	24	25	26	27	28	29	30
Ground	A	H	A	H	A	H	A	H	H	A	H	A	A	H	A	H	A	H	A	H	A	H	A	A	H	A	H	H	A	H
Result	D	D	D	L	L	W	L	D	D	L	L	D	L	W	L	W	W	L	L	W	L	L	L	D	W	L	D	W	L	W
Position															15					15					15	15				14

Source: Competitive matches
A = Away; H = Home; W = Win; D = Draw; L = Loss

=== Matches ===
Win Draw Loss

13 September Round 1	MC Saïda	2–2	USM Alger	Saïda
	Sahraoui 22'; Boufeldja 61'	Report	20' Tadilou; 44' Oualiken	Stadium: Stade des Frères Bracci
Note: Lineup for USM Alger - El Okbi, Nadji, Salah, Talbi, Guittoun, Belbekri, Tadilou, Bernaoui, Krimo, Oualikane, Meziani - Coach Abdelaziz Ben Tifour.

27 September Round 2	USM Alger	0–0	MC Alger	Saint-Eugène
		Report		Stadium: Stade de Saint-Eugène; Referee: Loubari
Note: Lineup for USM Alger - El Okbi, Nadji, Talbi, Guittoun, Zemmour, Belbekri, Tadilou, Meziani, Krimo, Oualiken, Bentifour - Coach Abdelaziz Ben Tifour.

4 October Round 3	MC Oran	1–1	USM Alger	Oran
	Meguenine 84'	Report	73' Krimo	Stadium: Henri Fouquès-Duparc Municipal
Note: Lineup for USM Alger - Bouchache, Krimo, Oualiken, Ben Tifour, Bernaoui, Meziani - Coach Abdelaziz Ben Tifour.

18 October Round 4	USM Alger	0–1	USM Blida	Saint-Eugène
15:00	Belbekri (penalty missed) 78'	Report	Baldo 34'	Stadium: Stade de Saint-Eugène; Attendance: 10,000; Referee: Zebairi
Note: Lineup for USM Alger - El Okbi, Nadji, Talbi, Guittoun, Zemmour, Belbekri, Tadilou, Bernaoui, Krimo, Oualiken, Meziani - Coach Abdelaziz Ben Tifour.

25 October Round 5	USM Sétif	3–0	USM Alger	Sétif
		Report		Stadium: Stade Mohamed Guessab

8 November Round 6	USM Alger	4–0	MO Constantine	Saint-Eugène
		Report		Stadium: Stade de Saint-Eugène

15 November Round 7	MSP Batna	1–0	USM Alger	Batna
		Report		Stadium: Mustapha Seffouhi Stadium

22 November Round 8	USM Alger	2–2	NA Hussein Dey	Saint-Eugène
		Report		Stadium: Stade de Saint-Eugène

6 December Round 9	USM Alger	1–1	ASM Oran	Saint-Eugène
	Salah 78'	Report	75' Abdelkader Reguig	Stadium: Stade de Saint-Eugène; Referee: Nezahi

20 December Round 10	ES Mostaganem	2–0	USM Alger	Mostaganem
	Maouche 50'; Zerroul 90'	Report		Stadium: Stade de Mostaganem

10 January Round 11	USM Alger	0–1	ES Sétif	Saint-Eugène
				Stadium: Stade de Saint-Eugène

17 January Round 12	CR Belcourt	1–1	USM Alger	Hamma Annassers
	Zitone ?'		?' Meziani	Stadium: Stade municipal Attendance: 8.000; Referee: Chabi

24 January Round 13	ES Guelma	1–0	USM Alger	Guelma
				Stadium: Stade de Guelma

31 January Round 14	USM Alger	4–1	USM Annaba (Note: USM Annaba mentioned in this article is a club founded in 1944 now called HAMRA Annaba. Not to be confused with the current USM Annaba, a club based in the same city but founded in 1983.)	Saint-Eugène
				Stadium: Stade de Saint-Eugène

7 February Round 15	JSM Tiaret	3–0	USM Alger	Tiaret
	Mimoun 8'; Said 24'; Soudani 31'

21 February Round 16	USM Alger	4–0	MC Saïda	Saint-Eugène
	Meziani 20', 67', 74'; Zemmouri 46'			Stadium: Stade de Saint-Eugène

28 February Round 17	MC Alger	w/o (Note: In the 1964–65 season in the second leg and by a decision of the Algerian Football Federation, USM Alger won 2–0 after the Ministry of Youth and Sports suspended MC Alger.)	USM Alger	Saint-Eugène
				Stadium: Stade de Saint-Eugène

7 March Round 18	USM Alger	0–1	MC Oran	Saint-Eugène
			Fréha 76'	Stadium: Stade de Saint-Eugène

21 March Round 19	USM Blida	4–0	USM Alger	Blida
				Stadium: Stade Frères Brakni

4 April Round 20	USM Alger	2–1	USM Sétif	Saint-Eugène
				Stadium: Stade de Saint-Eugène

11 April Round 21	MO Constantine	3–1	USM Alger	Constantine
				Stadium: Stade Turpin

18 April Round 22	USM Alger	0–2	MSP Batna	Saint-Eugène
				Stadium: Stade de Saint-Eugène

25 April Round 23	NA Hussein Dey	2–1	USM Alger	Hussein Dey
				Stadium: Zioui Brothers Stadium

16 May Round 24	ASM Oran	2–2	USM Alger	Oran
	Zrego 24'; Bouziane 26'		11' Guittoun; 21' Bernaoui	Stadium: Henri Fouquès-Duparc Municipal

23 May Round 25	USM Alger	3–1	ES Mostaganem	Saint-Eugène
	Meziani 3'; Guittoun 50'; Krimo 75'		Belagraa 80'	Stadium: Stade de Saint-Eugène

30 May Round 26	ES Sétif	2–0	USM Alger	Sétif
				Stadium: Stade Mohamed Guessab

6 June Round 27	USM Alger	0–0	CR Belcourt	Saint-Eugène
				Stadium: Stade de Saint-Eugène

13 June Round 28	USM Alger	2–0	ES Guelma	Saint-Eugène
				Stadium: Stade de Saint-Eugène

27 June Round 29	USM Annaba	4–0	USM Alger	Annaba
				Stadium: Colonel Chabou Abdelkader Stadium

3 July Round 30	USM Alger	3–1	JSM Tiaret	Saint-Eugène
	? ?'; Oualiken 51', 75'		Madjid 47'	Stadium: Stade de Saint-Eugène

=== Algerian Cup ===
22 November 6 tour régional	NA Hussein Dey	3–2	USM Alger

== Squad information ==
=== Playing statistics ===
No.	Pos	Nat	Player	Total		Division Nationale		Algerian Cup	
No.	Pos	Nat	Player	Apps	Goals	Apps	Goals	Apps	Goals
Goalkeepers
	GK	(Algeria) ALG	Djamel El Okbi	3	0	3	0	0	0
Defenders
	DF	(Algeria) ALG	Achour Salah	1	0	1	0	0	0
	DF	(Algeria) ALG	Brahim Talbi	3	0	3	0	0	0
	DF	(Algeria) ALG	Nadji	3	0	3	0	0	0
	DF	(Algeria) ALG		0	0	0	0	0	0
Midfielders
	MF	(Algeria) ALG	Boubekeur Belbekri	3	0	3	0	0	0
	MF	(France) FRA	Freddy Zemmour	2	0	2	0	0	0
	MF	(Algeria) ALG	Lakhdar Guittoun	3	0	3	0	0	0
	MF	(Algeria) ALG	Omar Tadilou	3	1	3	1	0	0
	MF	(Algeria) ALG	Ghazi Djermane	0	0	0	0	0	0
Forwards
	FW	(Algeria) ALG	Abderrahmane Meziani	3	0	3	0	0	0
	FW	(Algeria) ALG	Krimo Rebih	3	0	3	0	0	0
	FW	(Algeria) ALG	Hamid Bernaoui	2	0	2	0	0	0
	FW	(Algeria) ALG	Hocine Bouchache	0	0	0	0	0	0
	FW	(Algeria) ALG	Abdelaziz Ben Tifour	1	0	1	0	0	0
	FW	(Algeria) ALG	Amokrane Oualiken	3	1	3	1	0	0
Players transferred out during the season

Source: Competitions

=== Goalscorers ===
Includes all competitive matches. The list is sorted alphabetically by surname when total goals are equal.

No.	Nat.	Player	Pos.	DN 1	AC	TOTAL
?	(Algeria)	Abderrahmane Meziani	FW	11	0	11
?	(Algeria)	Amokrane Oualiken	FW	3	0	0
?	(Algeria)	Krimo Rebih	FW	2	0	0
?	(Algeria)	Lakhdar Guittoun	MF	2	0	0
?	(Algeria)	Omar Tadilou	MF	1	0	0
?	(Algeria)	Achour Salah	DF	1	0	0
?	(France)	Freddy Zemmour	MF	1	0	0
?	(Algeria)	Hamid Bernaoui	FW	1	0	0
Own Goals				0	0	0
Totals				33	2	35
