= 1965–66 USM Alger season =

USM Alger
1965–66 season
- President: Abdelkader Amrani
- Head coach: Amokrane Oualiken
- Stadium: Stade de Saint-Eugène
- Division d'Honneur: Runner-up
- Algerian Cup: Round of 16
- Top goalscorer: League: Krimo Rebih (11 goals); All: Krimo Rebih (11 goals)

The 1965–66 season was the first season for USM Alger in the Division d'Honneur. They also competed in the Algerian Cup.

== Review ==
The season was the first season for USM Alger in the Division d'Honneur under new coach Amokrane Oualiken, who replaced Abdelaziz Ben Tifour. Oualiken also actively played for the team as a player. The team played several friendly matches alongside MC Alger as part of a united team; this included a match against Brazilian side São Cristóvão, two matches against Spartak Hradec and a match against Olympique de Marseille.

In the first half of the season, the team recorded six consecutive victories in the Division d'Honneur and only one defeat, in a derby against OMR El Annasser, and were two points clear of WA Boufarik at the top of the league. In the Algerian Cup the team won their Round of 64 match against OM Saint Eugène with a goal by Hamid Bernaoui, and also won their Round of 32 match against NA Hussein Dey, however lost their Round of 16 match against MC Saida.

No teams were promoted to the Nationale I during the 1965–66 season season, meaning that it was only possible to fall from Nationale I to Nationale II and from Nationale II to Division d'Honneur. This took place to reduce the Nationale I to 12 teams and the Nationale II to 10 teams. USM Alger won a match late in the 24th round against RC Arbaâ, with goals from Lakhdar Guittoun and Abdelkader Ait Bouali. The team finished the season in second place with 72 points, behind MC Alger.

== Squad list ==
Players and squad numbers last updated on 19 September 1965.
Note: Flags indicate national team as has been defined under FIFA eligibility rules. Players may hold more than one non-FIFA nationality.

Nat.	Position	Name	Date of Birth (Age)	Signed from
(Algeria)	GK	Djamel El Okbi	15 October 1939 (aged 25)	(France) AS Saint Eugène
(Algeria)	DF	Fodil Oulkhiar	15 January 1944 (aged 21)	Youth system
(Algeria)	DF	Achour Salah	1 October 1933 (aged 31)	Youth system
(Algeria)	DF	Brahim Talbi	1940	(France) JU Alger
(Algeria)	DF	Mohamed Madani	2 March 1939 (aged 26)	
(France)	MF	Freddy Zemmour	21 February 1942 (aged 23)	(France) Gallia d'Alger
(Algeria)	MF	Ghazi Djermane	21 January 1942 (aged 23)	(France) Gallia d'Alger
(Algeria)	MF	Boubekeur Belbekri	7 January 1942 (aged 23)	(France) Gallia d'Alger
(Algeria)	MF	Lakhdar Guittoun	17 December 1939 (aged 25)	
(Algeria)	MF	Abdelkader Belhaou	21 December 1938 (aged 26)	
(Algeria)	MF	Abdelkader Saâdi	24 February 1946 (aged 19)	
(Algeria)	MF	Hamid Benkanoun		
(Algeria)	FW	Krimo Rebih	1 May 1932 (aged 33)	(Tunisia) Union sportive tunisienne
(Algeria)	FW	Abderrahmane Meziani	12 May 1942 (aged 23)	(France) AS Saint Eugène
(Algeria)	FW	Hamid Bernaoui	3 December 1937 (aged 27)	Youth system
(Algeria)	FW	Amokrane Oualiken	6 April 1933 (aged 32)	(Algeria) MC Alger
(Algeria)	FW	Boualem Rekkal		

== Pre-season and friendlies ==
22 August 1965 Tournoi de l'Amitié	MC Alger	3–1	USM Alger	Saint-Eugène
	Bourras 33'; Hamitouche 34'; Benali 35' Zerga, Zouaoui (Maârouf), Rabehi, Meziani Boualem (Embarek), Djazouli, Benfeddah Ali (Zouai), Rezkane, Aouadj Zoubir, Hamitouche, Benali, Bourras (Aissat)	[ Report]	Tadilou 40'	Stadium: Stade de Saint-Eugène

25 August 1965 Friendly	Entente MCA & USMA	1–1	(Brazil) São Cristóvão	Hamma Annassers
	Aouadj Zoubir 68' El Okbi (Lahmar, 46), Benkanoun (Bousseloub, 46), Embarek (Oulekhiar, 46), Madani (Rabehi, 46), Meziani Boualem (Djazouli, 46), Belbekri, Bernaoui (Djermane, 46), Rezkane (Guitoun, 46), Rebih Krimo (Matiben, 46), Aouadj Zoubir, Bouali (Benfeddah, 46)	[ Report]	Sgalla 80' Baitino, Lauro, Ailton, Haroldo, Elton, Edson, Guina, Jorge, Sgalla, Jair, Fraga, Solimar	Stadium: Stade El-Annasser

29 August 1965 Friendly	USM Alger	1–1	MC Alger	Saint-Eugène
	Bouali 20'	[ Report]	Aouadj Zoubir 60'	Stadium: Stade de Saint-Eugène

1965 Friendly	JS Fort de l'Eau	0–2	USM Alger	El Harrach
	Bouthera, Bouteldji, Ragueb, Lallem, Chettab, Bessam, Messaoudi, Aifa, Kouba, Mezbouk, Hamni	Report	Ghazi Djermane 75'; Meziani 89' El Okbi, Benkanoun, Branci, Oulkhiar, Madani, Belbekri, Guittoun, Djermane, Bouali, Bernaoui, Meziani - Coach: Amokrane Oualiken	Stadium: Stade d'El Harrach; Attendance: 1,500

1965 Friendly	USM Alger	3–1	USM Blida	Saint-Eugène
	Bouali 15'; Rebih 34'; Djermane 36' Tahir, Talbi, Madani, Benkanoun, Saâdi, Guittoun, Djermane, Krimo, Rekkal, Ibelaiden, Bouali, Bernaoui, Hemmar, Boutaleb	Report	Benterki 26' Guerraini, Begga, Brahim, Darridja, Benterki, Mohcen Henia, Mongi Haddad, Guerrache, Bouak, Gacem, Dahmani, Baldo	Stadium: Stade de Saint-Eugène; Attendance: 8,000

19 January 1966 Friendly	Entente MCA & USMA	2–3	(Czechoslovakia) Spartak Hradec	Hamma Annassers
21:00	Bourras 35'; Benfeddah 44' El Okbi (Boukerrou), Madani, Oulkhiar (Boualem Meziani), Kanoun (Maârouf), Abdelouahab Metrah, Belbekri, Bouras (Hammar), Benfeddah (Guittoun), Bernaoui (Zemmour), Aouadj, Abderahmane Meziani	Report	Metrah 65' (o.g.); Silbernagl 68'; Tauchen 75' Jindra, Huml, Pikman, Zahalka, Ing Monik, Silbernagl, Schmiat, Jonka, Touchen, Pakorny, Zikan, Zelinka	Stadium: Stade El-Annasser; Attendance: 6,000; Referee: Benganif

21 January 1966 Friendly	Entente MCA & USMA	1–1	(Czechoslovakia) Spartak Hradec	Saint-Eugène
	Pikman 35' (o.g.) Tahir Kamel, Kanoun, Madani, Metrah Abdelouahab, Oulkhiar, Belbekri (Zemmour), Djermane, Befeddah, Bourras (Bernaoui), Meziani Abderrahmane, Aouadj Zoubir	[ Report]	Zikan 75' Paulus, Huml, Pikman, Zahalka, Ing Monik, Silbernagl, Schmiat, Jonka, Touchen, Pokorny, Zikan	Stadium: Stade de Saint-Eugène; Referee: Loubari

15 March 1966 Friendly	Entente MCA & USMA	3–2	(France) Olympique de Marseille	Hamma Annassers
21:00	Bourras 11', Bernaoui 35'; Aouadj Zoubir 85' El Okbi, Bousseloub (Zemmour 46'), Madani, Metrah, Oulkhiar, Guitoun, Bourras, Benfeddah, Bernaoui, Aouadj Zoubir, Meziani	Report	Madani 30' (o.g.); Hatchi 76' Escale, Tassone (Lopez), Sejmera, Trusas, Berangé, Gauthier, Hatchi, Erhart, Brotons, Fiavo, Buron	Stadium: Stade El-Annasser; Attendance: 8,000; Referee: Amara

== Competitions ==
=== Overview ===
Competition	Record								Started round	Final position / round	First match	Last match
Competition	G	W	D	L	GF	GA	GD	Win %	Started round	Final position / round	First match	Last match
Division d'Honneur	30	17	8	5	53	23	+30	56.67	—N/a	Runner-up	19 September 1965	26 June 1966
Algerian Cup	3	1	1	1	3	3	+0	33.33	Round of 64	Round of 16	14 November 1965	6 February 1966
Total	33	18	9	6	56	26	+30	54.55				

=== Division d'Honneur ===
==== League table (Algérois) ====
Pos	Team	Pld	W	D	L	GF	GA	GD	Pts	Qualification or relegation
1	MC Alger (C)	30	21	7	2	67	19	+48	79	Promotion to Nationale I
2	USM Alger	30	17	8	5	53	23	+30	72	Promotion to Nationale I
3	WA Boufarik	30	16	9	5	54	23	+31	71	
4	OMR El Annasser	30	13	10	7	49	26	+23	66	
5	JS Kabylie	30	12	11	7	45	32	+13	65	
6	Hydra AC	30	13	8	9	37	27	+10	64	
7	WO Rouiba	30	8	15	7	33	29	+4	61	
8	OM Saint Eugène	30	9	13	8	24	29	−5	61	
9	SC Affreville	30	11	9	10	35	39	−4	61	
10	AS Orléanville	30	10	9	11	38	35	+3	59	
11	USM Maison carrée	30	9	11	10	35	39	−4	59	
12	MS Cherchell	30	7	13	10	35	46	−11	57	
13	ASPTT Alger	30	5	12	13	19	34	−15	52	Relegation to Régional
14	JS El Biar	30	6	6	18	22	54	−32	48	Relegation to Régional
15	RC Arbaâ	30	3	7	20	0	0	0	43	Relegation to Régional
16	Stade Aïn Benian	30	1	8	21	25	84	−59	40	Relegation to Régional

Updated to match(es) played on unknown. Source:
Rules for classification: 1) points; 2) head-to-head points; 3) head-to-head goal difference; 4) goal difference; 5) total goals; 6) fairplay ranking; 7) playoff.
(C) Champions

=== Results by round ===
Round	1	2	3	4	5	6	7	8	9	10	11	12	13	14	15	16	17	18	19	20	21	22	23	24	25	26	27	28	29	30
Ground	H	A	H	A	H	A	H	A	H	A	H	A	A	H	H	A	H	A	H	A	H	A	H	A	H	A	H	H	A	A
Result	W	W	W	W	W	W	D	D	W	L	W	D	W	W	W	W	W	D	L	D	D	W		W	D	L	W	W	L	
Position				1	1	1	1	1	1	1	1	1	1	1	1	1	1		2	2	2	2					2	2	2	2

Source: Competitive matches
A = Away; H = Home; W = Win; D = Draw; L = Loss

==== Matches ====
Win Draw Loss

19 September 1965 Round 1	USM Alger	–	WO Rouiba	Saint-Eugène
		[ Report]		Stadium: Stade de Saint-Eugène

26 September 1965 Round 2	Stade Aïn Benian	–	USM Alger

3 October 1965 Round 3	USM Alger	4–0	OM Saint Eugène	Saint-Eugène
	, , , , , , , , , ,		, , , , , , , , , ,	Stadium: Stade de Saint-Eugène

10 October 1965 Round 4	MC Alger	1–2	USM Alger	Saint-Eugène
	Benali 63' Zerga, Rabehi, Embarek, Bousseloub, Boualem Meziani, Ali Benfeddah (c), Benali, Djazouli, Berkani, Zoubir Aouadj, Bourras - Coach: Ali Benfeddah	[ Report] Report	Bousseloub 74' (o.g.); Bernaoui 75' El Okbi, Benkanoun, Madani, Branci, Oulkhiar, Belbekri, Djermane, Guittoun, Rebih Krimo, Bernaoui - Coach: Amokrane Oualiken	Stadium: Stade de Saint-Eugène; Referee: Loubari

24 October 1965 Round 5	USM Alger	5–1	MS Cherchell	Saint-Eugène
	Meziani (?) 55'; Guittoun (?) ? 48' (o.g.); Belbekri 85' (pen.) El Okbi, , , , , , Bernaoui, Belbekri, Guittoun, Krimo, Meziani	Report; Report	Mokdadi 43', , , , , , , , , ,	Stadium: Stade de Saint-Eugène

7 November 1965 Round 6	AS Orléanville	1–2	USM Alger	Orléanville
	Feknous 86' Malmoun, Abed, Douibi, Medadi, Zairi, Djilil, Fedlaoui, Feknous, Andalousie, Gribi, Baghdad - Coach: Driss	Report; Report	Krimo 5', 83' El Okbi, Zemmour, Madani, Oulkhiar, Saàdi, Branci, Djermane, Guittoun, Krimo, Bernaoui, Meziani - Coach: Amokrane Oualiken	Stadium: Stade Maâmar Sahli; Attendance: 2,000; Referee: Abdelkrim Benguergoura

21 November 1965 Round 7	USM Alger	2–2	AS PTT Alger	Saint-Eugène
	Bernaoui 2'; Guittoun 7' Osman, Fayçal Boutaleb, Madani, Branci, Zemmour, Oulkhiar, Belbekri, Bouali, Meziani, Guittoun, Bernaoui - Coach: Amokrane Oualiken	Report; Report	Bianca 25'; Chiniguen 60' Benabed.A, Said Saàdi, Amaouche, Bernani, Slimani, Chafai, Boualem, Chiniguen, Bianca, Benabed.B, Sbaà	Stadium: Stade de Saint-Eugène

28 November 1965 Round 8	WA Boufarik	0–0	USM Alger	Boufarik
	Ferhat, Abdouzi, Merouani, Yousfi, Ahmed, Guenil, Rezzik, Benaldi, Chikaoui, Rouai, Belkebir - Coach: Ahmed	Report; Report	El Okbi, Benkanoun, Madani, Branci, Oulkhiar, Saàdi, Hammar, Guittoun, Bouali, Bernaoui - Coach: Amokrane Oualiken	Stadium: Stade Mohamed Reggaz; Attendance: 4,000; Referee: Lakehal, Amara, Amroun

5 December 1965 Round 9	USM Alger	4–0	RC Arbaâ	Saint-Eugène
	Hammar 5'; Krimo 58', 78', 79' El Okbi, Kanoun Makhlouf, Madani, Oulkhiar, Branci Akli, Zemmour, Hammar, Guittoun, Krimo, Bernaoui, Djellal Abderrahmane - Coach: Amokrane Oualiken	Report; Report	Znimi, Ouahab, Mehadjbia, Kadem, Briedj, Bibi, Zeghimi.M, Dali, Zeghimi.A, Znimi, Morsi	Stadium: Stade de Saint-Eugène

26 December 1965 Round 10	OMR El Annasser	4–0	USM Alger	Hamma Annassers
	Mesbah 2'; Selmi 17', 88' (pen.); Ichalalen 62' Liés, Zair, Hammouche II, Hammouche I, Matoub, Khennas, Berroudji, Rezzoug, Mesbah, Salmi, Ichalaléne - Coach: El Kamal	Report; Report	El Okbi, Benkanoun, Oulkhiar, Madani, Branci, Guittoun, Bernaoui, Zemmour, Krimo, Hammar, Meziani - Coach: Amokrane Oualiken	Stadium: Stade El-Annasser; Attendance: 10,000; Referee: Abdelaziz Chekaïmi

2 January 1966 Round 11	USM Alger	1–0	SC Affreville	Saint-Eugène
	Bouali 43'	[ Report] Report		Stadium: Stade de Saint-Eugène

9 January 1966 Round 12	JS Kabylie	1–1	USM Alger	Tizi Ouzou
	Koufi 60' Berkani, ?, ?, ?, ?, Haouchine, El Kolli, Terzi, Rafai, ?, Koufi	Report; Report	Meziani 61' El Okbi, Oulkhiar, Saàdi, Belbekri, Djermane, ?, ?, ?, Krimo, Bernaoui, Meziani - Coach: Amokrane Oualiken	Stadium: Stade Oukil Ramdane; Attendance: 1,500; Referee: Loubari

16 January 1966 Round 13	USM Maison carrée	1–3	USM Alger	El Harrach
	Chenafi 75' Penaud, Hadj Zoubir, Boudissa, Nahnah, Bouzid, Bentifour, Ait Messaoud, Chenafi, Ferag, Athmane, Enkouche	Report; Report	Hammar 27'; Guittoun 34'; Meziani 50' El Okbi, Benkanoun, Madani, Saàdi, Oulkhiar, Belbekri, Hammar, Zemmour, Bernaoui, Guittoun, Meziani - Coach: Amokrane Oualiken	Stadium: Stade d'El Harrach; Attendance: 3,000

23 January 1966 Round 14	USM Alger	1–0	Hydra AC	Saint-Eugène
	Lakhdar Guittoun 84' El Okbi, Benkanoun, Madani, Oulkhiar, Saàdi, Belbekri, Hammar, Guittoun, Zemmour, Bernaoui, Meziani - Coach: Amokrane Oualiken	Report; Report	Bourray, Mechli, Guerrai, Si Chaib, Belkaim, Namane, Berkane, Chadli, Kiheli, Ferhaoui, Azza - Coach: Mohamed Maouche	Stadium: Stade de Saint-Eugène

30 January 1966 Round 15	USM Alger	1–0	JS El Biar	Saint-Eugène
	Bernaoui 69' El Okbi, Oulkhiar, Belbekri, Benkanoun, Madani, Djermane, Krimo, Zemmour, Bernaoui, Saadi, Guittoun - Coach: Amokrane Oualiken	Report; Report	Ouabri, Benmami, Issaàd.K, Chenit, Soukane, Boukadoum, Nabhani, Moha, Issaàd.N, Bensalah, Aridj	Stadium: Stade de Saint-Eugène

13 February 1966 Round 16	WO Rouiba	0–1	USM Alger	Rouïba
			Bernaoui 14'

27 February 1966 Round 17	USM Alger	3–0	Stade Aïn Benian	Saint-Eugène
	Bouali 32', 73'; Hemmar 50' El Okbi, Benkanoun, Madani, Saâdi, Oulkhiar, Belbekri, Hemmar, Guittoun, Bernaoui, Bouali, Djellal - Coach: Amokrane Oualiken	Report	Nassou, Bouabdellah, Yousfi.H, Yousfi.M, Gherbi, Chaker, Mouhoub, Bennour, Lardjane, Lechelache, Ahmida	Stadium: Stade de Saint-Eugène

13 March 1966 Round 18	OM Saint Eugène	0–0	USM Alger	Saint-Eugène
	Boubekeur, Keddad, Laakri, Moudjeb, Cheikh, Benabes, Bouali, Lounés, Tahir, Tobni, Tchalabi - Coach: Hamid Bellamine	Report	El Okbi, Benkanoun, Madani, Saâdi, Oulkhiar, Belbekri, Krimo, Guittoun, Bernaoui, Bouali, Meziani - Coach: Amokrane Oualiken	Stadium: Stade de Saint-Eugène; Attendance: 13,000; Referee: Lakehal

27 March 1966 Round 19	USM Alger	1–3	MC Alger	Saint-Eugène
	Belbekri 53' El Okbi, Belbekri, Zemmour, Bernaoui, Meziani, Guittoun ?, ?, ?, ?, ? - Coach: Amokrane Oualiken	Report	Benfadah 6'; Mourad Saâdi 25'; Oucif 68' Boukerrou, Maârouf, Bousseloub, Abdelouahab Metrah, Zouaoui, Boualem Meziani, Bourras, Ali Benfeddah (c), Saâdi Mourad, Aouadj, Oucif - Coach: Ali Benfeddah	Stadium: Stade de Saint-Eugène; Attendance: 20,000; Referee: Abdelaziz Chekaïmi

3 April 1966 Round 20	MS Cherchell	2–2	USM Alger	Cherchell
	Mahieddine 2'; Bouricha 30' Bakhti, Aiouaz, Mechentel, Madoun, Berouane, Abderrazak, Mahieddine, Menai Yahia, Bouricha, Yacout, Mokdadi	Report; Report	Meziani 11', 20' El Okbi, Oulkhiar, Benkanoun, Talbi, Zemmour, Belbekri, Belhaou, Guittoun, Bernaoui, Meziani, Oualiken - Coach: Amokrane Oualiken	Stadium: Stade Lakhdar Bouchema; Referee: Athmane, Touhami, Mekhbati

10 April 1966 Round 21	USM Alger	1–1	AS Orléanville	Saint-Eugène
	Krimo 38' El Okbi, Boutaleb, Talbi, Oulkhiar, Belhaou, Zemmour, Belbekri, Guittoun, Krimo, Bernaoui, Meziani - Coach: Amokrane Oualiken	Report	SNP Mohammed 6' Ben mokhtar, Douibi, SNP Driss, Medadi, Zair, Djilli, Fedlaoui, Gribi, Mazouz, SNP Mohammed, Feknous	Stadium: Stade de Saint-Eugène; Attendance: 4,000; Referee: Borg

17 April 1966 Round 22	AS PTT Alger	0–3	USM Alger	Algiers
	Abdelouahab, Said, Amaouche, Faham, Chafai, Yacef, Allab, Kerraz, Slimane, Cheniguel, Aliouane	Report	Krimo 27', 38'; Belhaou 87' El Okbi, Talbi, Madani, Zemmour, Belbekri, Belhaou, Bernaoui, Krimo, Meziani, Djellal, ? - Coach: Amokrane Oualiken	Stadium: Stade Ferhani; Referee: Ait Ali

8 May 1966 Round 23	USM Alger	–	WA Boufarik	Saint-Eugène
	, , , , , , , , , ,		, , , , , , , , , ,	Stadium: Stade de Saint-Eugène

15 May 1966 Round 24	RC Arbaâ	0–2	USM Alger	Larbaâ
	, , , , , , , , , ,	Report	Guittoun 46'; Bouali 79', Oulkhiar, , , Bouali, , , Guittoun, , , Bernaoui	Stadium: Ismaïl Makhlouf Stadium; Referee: Abdelaziz Chekaïmi

22 May 1966 Round 25	USM Alger	0–0	OMR El Annasser	Saint-Eugène
	El Okbi, Talbi, Madani, Zemmour, Oulkhiar, Belbekri, Djermane, Guittoun, Bernaoui, Meziani, Djellal - Coach: Amokrane Oualiken	Report	Liés, Zair, Hammouche.A, Bachta, Khennas, Madani, Berroudji, Amoura, Salmi, Rezzoug, Ichalaléne - Coach: El Kamal	Stadium: Stade de Saint-Eugène; Attendance: 10,000; Referee: Borg

29 May 1966 Round 26	SC Affreville	1–0	USM Alger	Affreville
	Mazouz 75' Djitli, Itiem, Benmokadem, Belkheir, Rahmani, Bellila, Meharzi, Mazouz, Kaida, Bouyekhlef, Oussisra	Report	El Okbi, Talbi, Madani, Oulkhiar, Zemmour, Belbekri, Djermane, Bernaoui, Rekkal, Krimo, Djellal	Stadium: Stade Mohamed belkebir Referee: Loubari

5 June 1966 Round 27	USM Alger	4–1	JS Kabylie	Saint-Eugène
	Krimo 24'; Meziani 34'; Bouali 57', 70' El Okbi, Madani, Talbi, Oulkhiar, Belbekri, Zemmour, Djermane, Bouali, Krimo, Bernaoui, Meziani - Coach: Amokrane Oualiken	Report	Ait Amar 85' Belahcéne, Ait-Amar, Dardar, Rafai, Haouchine, Terzi, Karamani, Koufi, Ouhabi, Khelfi, Kolli - Coach: Haouchine	Stadium: Stade de Saint-Eugène; Attendance: 20,000; Referee: Abdelaziz Chekaïmi

12 June 1966 Round 28	USM Alger	1–0	USM Maison carrée	Saint-Eugène
	Krimo 57' El Okbi, Talbi, Madani, Zemmour, Oulkhiar, Belbekri, Belhaou, Bouali, Krimo, Bernaoui, Meziani	Report	, , , , , , , , , ,	Stadium: Stade de Saint-Eugène; Attendance: 4,000; Referee: Loubari

19 June 1966 Round 29	Hydra AC	3–1	USM Alger	Hydra
	Allik 10'; Ouchéne 19'; Rezkane 30' Bouray, Mechti, Guerrat, Si Chaib, Belkaim, Namane, Alik, Belabed, Ouchéne, Rezkane, Salhi - Coach: Boudjemaà	Report	Krimo 79' El Okbi, Talbi, Madani, Zemmour, Oulkhiar, Belbekri, Belhaou, Bouali, Krimo, Bernaoui, Meziani - Coach: Amokrane Oualiken	Stadium: Stade D'hydra; Attendance: 3,000; Referee: Osmane

26 June 1966 Round 30	JS El Biar	–	USM Alger	El Biar
	, , , , , , , , , ,		, , , , , , , , , ,	Stadium: Stade Abderrahmane Ibrir

=== Algerian Cup ===
14 November 1965 Round of 64	USM Alger	1–0	OM Saint Eugène	Saint-Eugène
	Bernaoui 8' El Okbi, Benkanoun, Madani, Oulkhiar, Branci, Bouali, Guittoun, Bernaoui, Belbekri, Oualiken, Meziani - Coach: Amokrane Oualiken	[ Report]	Boubekeur, Reddad, Tobni, Moudjeb, Cheikh, Bouali, Lounés, Achour, Berrebhi, Mokrane, Tchalabi - Coach: Hamid Bellamine	Stadium: Stade de Saint-Eugène; Attendance: 10,000; Referee: Amara

12 December 1965 Round of 32	NA Hussein Dey	2–2 (a.e.t.)	USM Alger	Hamma Annassers
	Saàdi 72', 100' Ouechen, Boudissa, Ouali, Bouyahi, Defnoun, Taoufik, Youcef, Abdelkader, Saàdi, Boukikaz, Kassoul - Coach: Defnoun	[ Report]	Guittoun 71', 119' El Okbi, Benkanoun, Oulkhiar, Madani, Branci, Belbekri, Bernaoui, Zemmour, Guittoun, Krimo, Meziani - Coach: Amokrane Oualiken	Stadium: Stade El-Annasser; Attendance: 20,000; Referee: Loubari
Note: In the event that the match ended in a tie, the winner was determined by the number of corner kicks, therefore USM Alger won by 8 corner kicks to 5.

6 February 1966 Round of 16	MC Saïda	1–0	USM Alger	Oran
	Sahraoui 27' Chérifi, Bouziane, Mokri, Fezza, Moumni II, Tlemçani, Kerroum, Sahraoui, Amara, Moumni I, Kebaili	[ Report]	El Okbi, Benkanoun, Oulkhiar, Madani, Zemmour, Belbekri, Hammar, Guittoun, Krimo, Bernaoui, Meziani - Coach: Amokrane Oualiken	Stadium: Stade 19 juin 1965; Attendance: 25,000; Referee: Benchériet

== Squad information ==
=== Appearances and goals ===
No.	Pos	Nat	Player	Total		Division d'Honneur		Algerian Cup	
No.	Pos	Nat	Player	Apps	Goals	Apps	Goals	Apps	Goals
Goalkeepers
-	GK	(Algeria) ALG	Djamel El Okbi	20	0	17	0	3	0
-	GK	(Algeria) ALG	Osman	1	0	1	0	0	0
Defenders
-	DF	(Algeria) ALG	Hamid Madani	19	0	16	0	3	0
-	DF	(Algeria) ALG	Fodil Oulkhiar	20	0	17	0	3	0
-	DF	(Algeria) ALG	Akli Branci	7	0	5	0	2	0
-	DF	(Algeria) ALG	Fayçal Boutaleb	2	0	2	0	0	0
-	DF	(Algeria) ALG	Brahim Talbi	8	0	8	0	0	0
-	DF	(Algeria) ALG	Achour Salah	0	0	0	0	0	0
Midfielders
-	MF	(France) FRA	Freddy Zemmour	17	0	15	0	2	0
-	MF	(Algeria) ALG	Ghazi Djermane	5	0	5	0	0	0
-	MF	(Algeria) ALG	Boubekeur Belbekri	17	0	14	0	3	0
-	MF	(Algeria) ALG	Lakhdar Guittoun	16	5	13	3	3	2
-	MF	(Algeria) ALG	Makhlouf Kanoun	12	0	9	0	3	0
-	MF	(Algeria) ALG	Abdelkader Saâdi	7	0	7	0	0	0
-	MF	(Algeria) ALG	Abdelkader Belhaou	5	1	5	1	0	0
Forwards
-	FW	(Algeria) ALG	Krimo Rebih	13	11	11	11	2	0
-	FW	(Algeria) ALG	Abderrahmane Meziani	16	4	13	4	3	0
-	FW	(Algeria) ALG	Hamid Bernaoui	21	3	18	2	3	1
-	FW	(Algeria) ALG	Rachid Hemmar	7	3	6	3	1	0
-	FW	(Algeria) ALG	Amokrane Oualiken	2	0	1	0	1	0
-	FW	(Algeria) ALG	Abderahmane Djellal	5	0	5	0	0	0
-	FW	(Algeria) ALG	Boualem Rekkal	1	0	1	0	0	0
-	FW	(Algeria) ALG	Abdelkader Ait Bouali	8	4	7	4	1	0

Last updated: 1 May 2017
Source: Competitions

=== Goalscorers ===
Includes all competitive matches. The list is sorted alphabetically by surname when total goals are equal.

Nat.	Player	Pos.	DH	AC	TOTAL
(Algeria)	Krimo Rebih	FW	11	0	11
(Algeria)	Abderrahmane Meziani	FW	7	0	7
(Algeria)	Lakhdar Guittoun	MF	5	2	7
(Algeria)	Abdelkader Ait Bouali	?	6	0	6
(Algeria)	Hamid Bernaoui	FW	4	1	5
(Algeria)	Rachid Hemmar	FW	3	0	3
(Algeria)	Boubekeur Belbekri	MF	2	0	2
(Algeria)	Abdelkader Belhaou	MF	1	0	1
Own Goals			2	0	2
Totals			41	3	44
