= 1963–64 Algerian Championnat National =

Algerian Championnat National
- Season: 1963–64
- Dates: 21 September 1963 – 21 June 1964
- Champions: USM Annaba

The 1963–64 Algerian Championnat National was the second season of the Algerian Championnat National since its establishment in 1962. A total of 49 teams contested the league, with USM Alger as the defending champions. USM Annaba was the winner beating in the final NA Hussein Dey.

== League table ==
=== Algérois ===
Pos	Team	Pld	W	D	L	GF	GA	GD	Pts	Promotion or qualification
1	NA Hussein Dey	30	19	7	4	72	29	+43	75	Promoted for 1964–65 Championnat National
2	CR Belcourt	30	19	7	4	72	24	+48	75	Promoted for 1964–65 Championnat National
3	USM Alger	30	19	6	5	69	23	+46	74	Promoted for 1964–65 Championnat National
4	USM Blida	30	18	6	6	46	28	+18	72	Promoted for 1964–65 Championnat National
5	MC Alger	30	18	5	7	52	28	+24	71	Qualification to Championnat National play-offs
6	OM Ruisseau	30	15	7	8	46	39	+7	67	
7	WA Boufarik	30	14	6	10	47	38	+9	64	
8	JS Kabylie	30	10	11	9	32	36	−4	61	
9	JS El Biar	30	11	7	12	44	43	+1	59	
10	USM Maison-Carrée	30	9	11	10	40	41	−1	59	
11	OM Saint-Eugène	30	8	10	12	31	43	−12	57	
12	AS Orléansville	30	7	8	15	20	53	−33	52	
13	ASPTT Alger	30	5	8	17	28	64	−36	48	
14	USM Marengo	30	6	3	21	0	0	0	45	
15	RC Arbaâ	30	1	8	21	27	74	−47	40	
16	S. Guyotville	30	2	5	23	16	82	−66	39	

Source: rsssf.com

=== Oranie ===
Pos	Team	Pld	W	D	L	GF	GA	GD	Pts	Promotion or qualification
1	ASM Oran	32	20	9	3	73	27	+46	81	Promoted for 1964–65 Championnat National
2	MC Oran	30	19	7	4	68	31	+37	75	Promoted for 1964–65 Championnat National
3	MC Saïda	31	17	9	5	65	35	+30	74	Promoted for 1964–65 Championnat National
4	ES Mostaganem	30	17	6	7	58	40	+18	70	Promoted for 1964–65 Championnat National
5	JSM Tiaret	31	17	9	5	60	35	+25	68	Qualification to Championnat National play-offs
6	SCM Oran	31	11	11	9	54	58	−4	64	
7	USM Bel-Abbès	31	10	11	10	32	38	−6	62	
8	CC Sig	31	11	9	11	34	39	−5	62	
9	RC Oran	31	8	14	9	45	56	−11	62	
10	GC Mascara	31	10	9	12	35	38	−3	61	
11	CR Témouchent	30	10	9	11	36	27	+9	59	
12	CA Planteurs	30	10	9	11	34	48	−14	59	
13	Perrégauloise GS	30	10	9	11	46	59	−13	58	
14	RC Relizane	29	5	14	10	33	37	−4	56	
15	OM Arzew	30	4	6	20	34	68	−34	44	
16	EM Oran	27	1	6	20	19	53	−34	33	
17	WA Tlemcen	29	1	3	25	11	24	−13	32	

Source: rsssf.com

=== Constantinois ===
In Constantine, the Honor Division is divided into two regional groups each containing 8 teams. The winners of the two groups qualify for the final tournament.

==== Eastern Group ====
Pos	Team	Pld	W	D	L	GF	GA	GD	Pts	Promotion or qualification
1	USM Annaba	0	0	0	0	0	0	0	0	Promoted for 1964–65 Championnat National
2	ES Guelma	0	0	0	0	0	0	0	0	Promoted for 1964–65 Championnat National
3	USM Khenchela	0	0	0	0	0	0	0	0	
4	USM Aïn Béïda	0	0	0	0	0	0	0	0	
5	JSM Skikda	0	0	0	0	0	0	0	0	
6	US Tébessa	0	0	0	0	0	0	0	0	
7	JBAC Annaba	0	0	0	0	0	0	0	0	
8	ES Souk Ahras	0	0	0	0	0	0	0	0	

Source: rsssf.com

==== West group ====
Pos	Team	Pld	W	D	L	GF	GA	GD	Pts	Promotion or qualification
1	MSP Batna	14	8	4	2	15	3	+12	34	Promoted for 1964–65 Championnat National
2	ES Sétif	14	6	8	0	25	12	+13	34	Promoted for 1964–65 Championnat National
3	USM Sétif	14	8	3	3	24	11	+13	33	Qualification to Championnat National play-offs
4	MO Constantine	14	7	3	4	19	15	+4	31	
5	USH Constantine	14	4	7	3	14	12	+2	29	
6	JS Djidjelli	14	7	1	6	23	26	−3	29	
7	MC El Eulma	14	1	2	11	8	24	−16	18	
8	US Biskra	14	1	0	13	14	39	−25	18	

Source: rsssf.com

== Final tournament ==
Semi-finals
20 June 1964 –
USM Annaba	4
ASM Oran	0
20 June 1964 –
MSP Batna	0
NA Hussein Dey	1

Final
21 June 1964 – Ben Abdelmalek Stadium, Constantine
USM Annaba	1
NA Hussein Dey	0
Third place
21 June 1964 –
ASM Oran	1
MSP Batna	0

== Season statistics ==
=== Top scorers (Algérois) ===
R.	Goalscorer	Team	Goals
1	(Algeria) Hocine Saâdi	NA Hussein Dey	31
2	(Algeria) Hacène Lalmas	CR Belcourt	30
3	(Algeria) Youssef	NA Hussein Dey	22
4	(France) Gérard Baldo	USM Blida	20
5	(Algeria) Zoubir Aouadj	MC Alger	19
6	(Algeria) Abderrahmane Meziani	USM Alger	14
7	(Algeria) Hassan Achour	CR Belcourt	13
7	(Algeria) Hamid Bernaoui	USM Alger	13
9	(Algeria) Mohamed Bouricha	WA Boufarik	12
10	(Algeria) Fedlaoui	WA Boufarik	11
10	(Algeria) Rezzoug	OM Ruisseau	11
12	(Algeria) Zerrouk Cheikh	OM Saint-Eugène	10
12	(Algeria) Kassoul	JS El Biar	10
12	(Algeria) Zitouni	OM Ruisseau	10
15	(Algeria) Benatig	ASPTT Alger	9
15	(Algeria) Bouchache	USM Alger	9
15	(Algeria) Lemoui	MC Alger	9
18	(Algeria) Krimo Rebih	USM Alger	8
18	(Algeria) Rezzik	WA Boufarik	8
18	(Algeria) Amaouche	ASPTT Alger	8

=== Top scorers (Oranie) ===
R.	Goalscorer	Team	Goals
1	(Algeria) Abdelkader Reguig	ASM Oran	21
2	(Algeria) Abdelkader Fréha	MC Oran	12
3	(Algeria) Mohamed Bouhizeb	SCM Oran	11
4	(Algeria) Saïd	RCG Oran	10
5	(Algeria) Karim Hamida	MC Oran	9
