= 1963 Championnat National 1 final =

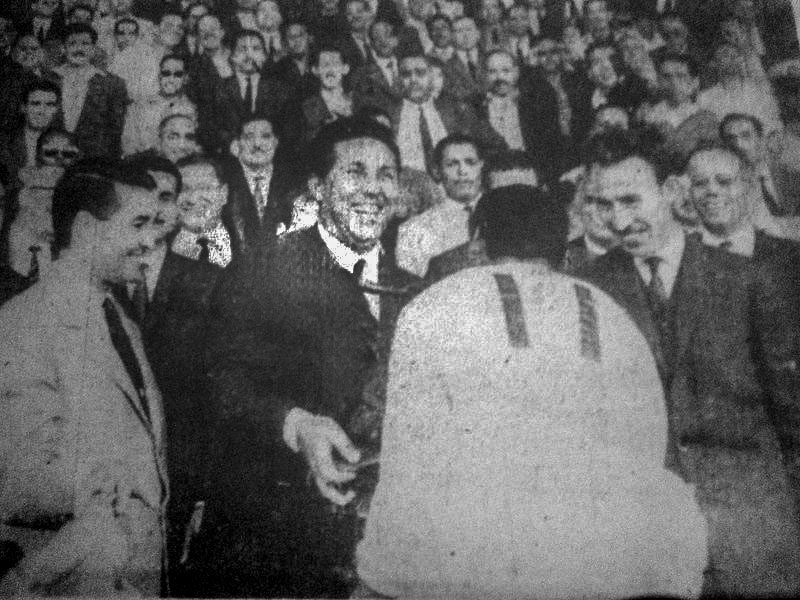
- Bentifour, coach of the USM Alger receives from the hands of Ben Bella president, the first trophy Algerian football championship, under the gaze of President of the FAF the Dr Maouche (left) and Minister of Defense Houari Boumedienne (right)
- Event: 1962–63 Algerian Championnat National
USM Alger	MC Alger
3	0
- Date: June 16, 1963
- Venue: Stade d'El Anasser, Algiers
- Attendance: 20.000

The 1963 Championnat National 1 final was the first final of the Algerian Championnat after the country's independence. The match took place on June 16, 1963, at Stade d'El Anasser in Algiers with kick-off at 15:00. USM Alger beat MC Alger 3–0 to win their first Algerian Championnat.

== Competition procedure ==
In 1962, it was only a regional championship called "Critérium Honneur". After several months of administrative procedures and the affiliations of clubs to the various regional organizations governing football in Algeria, football competitions came back to life in the country. Given the geographical distribution of clubs across the country, formerly divided into three departments under the French colonial administration, each league took charge of organizing competitions autonomously, encouraged by the Ministry of Youth and Sports.

Thus, all the football teams in the country are divided into several groups according to their territorial affinities; they compete with the aim of finishing as "Champions of the groups" to which they were assigned. Then the winners compete in a second phase in a regional tournament in order to designate the "regional champions". In the Central region, sixty clubs are divided into five groups of ten participants each, for the Eastern region only three groups of nine teams each; as for the Western region, the most populated, it has seventy clubs divided into six groups. During this first season, there were therefore qualifiers in the three major regions of the country in order to designate the participants in the final national tournament to award the first title of Algerian Football Champion.

== Critériums d'Honneur ==
=== Groupe I ===
Pos	Team	Pld	W	D	L	GF	GA	GD	Pts	Promotion or qualification
1	MC Alger	18	13	3	2	49	13	+36	47	Qualification to a final group, promoted for 1963–64 Honor Division
2	JS Kabylie	18	13	3	2	50	15	+35	47	Promoted for 1963–64 Honor Division
3	USM Maison-Carrée	18	10	4	4	48	18	+30	42	Promoted for 1963–64 Honor Division
4	RS Alger	18	10	1	7	32	25	+7	39	Promoted for 1963–64 Pre Honor Division (D2)
5	JS Bordj Ménaïel	18	6	7	5	32	24	+8	37	Promoted for 1963–64 Pre Honor Division (D2)

Source: rsssf.com

=== Groupe V ===
Pos	Team	Pld	W	D	L	GF	GA	GD	Pts	Promotion or qualification
1	USM Alger	18	16	1	1	75	6	+69	51	Qualification to a final group, promoted for 1963–64 Honor Division
2	USM Marengo	18	10	5	3	40	18	+22	43	Promoted for 1963–64 Honor Division
3	USM Blida	18	10	3	5	57	12	+45	41	Promoted for 1963–64 Honor Division
4	RC Arbaâ	18	10	3	5	46	26	+20	41	Promoted for 1963–64 Honor Division
5	USH Alger	18	8	6	4	28	18	+10	40	Promoted for 1963–64 Pre Honor Division (D2)

Source: rsssf.com

== Final rankings (Algiers) ==
Pos	Team	Pld	W	D	L	GF	GA	GD	Pts	Qualification
1	USM Alger	4	4	0	0	15	3	+12	12	Qualification to a national tournament
2	MC Alger	4	3	0	1	9	2	+7	10	Qualification to a national tournament
3	AS Orléansville	4	2	0	2	5	7	−2	8	
4	NA Hussein Dey	4	1	0	3	7	12	−5	6	
5	OM Saint-Eugène	4	0	0	4	3	15	−12	4	

Source: rsssf.com

=== Championnat Algiers Final ===
9 June 1963
15:00

USM Alger	2 – 1	MC Alger
Meziani 16'; Rebih 38'		8' Lâagoun

Stade Saint Eugène, Algiers
Referee: Benzellat

=== Semi-finals ===
15 June 1963
15:00

MC Alger	4 – 0	SCM Oran
Hahad 25' (pen.); Oualiken 40', 50', 60'

Stade d'El Anasser, Algiers
Attendance: 20.000
Referee: Mohammedi

14 June 1963
15:00

USM Alger	2 – 2.	USM Bône
Salah; Bernaoui		? ?

Stade d'El Anasser, Algiers
Attendance: 20.000

== Pre-match ==
A mini tournament is organized between these clubs to designate the county champion. USM Alger finally prevail in the final two goals to one against MC Alger and will enter the final round with winners from other regions. The runner accompany because it was decided that the central region for the first two teams qualify criterion.

A tournament is held between the winners of these regional criteriums, a sort of "play-off" whose goal is to identify the first "Champion of Algeria football." In the semi-final draw to give USM Alger match against USM Bône and MC Alger facing SCM Oran. In the first meeting, Bône little bow face to Algiers by the rule of the many corners obtained in a scoreless game after a goal everywhere. In the other match, the mouloudia wins against the Oran on the final score four goals to nil. At the end of the tournament, the first title was awarded to USM Alger, MC Alger winner by three goals to nil. The two losers of the semifinals fought for third place, and that's USM Bône who prevailed over the SCM Oran by four goals to one.

=== Details ===
June 16, 1963
15:00

USM Alger	3 - 0	MC Alger
Ben Tifour 54'; Rebih 73'; Bernaoui 85'	Report

Stade d'El Anasser, Algiers
Attendance: 20,000
Referee: Mohamed Mezahi (LRF Constantine)

USM Alger	MC Alger

GK	1	(Algeria) Djamel El Okbi
DF	?	(Algeria) Mohamed Madani
MF	?	(Algeria) Mohamed Djemâa
DF	?	(Algeria) Achour Salah
DF	?	(Algeria) Rachid Aftouche
MF	?	(Algeria) Boubekeur Belbekri
MF	?	(Algeria) Ghazi Djermane
MF	6	(France) Freddy Zemmour
FW	10	(Algeria) Hamid Bernaoui
FW	9	(Algeria) Krimo Rebih
FW	11	(Algeria) Abdelaziz Ben Tifour (c)
Manager :
(Algeria) Abdelaziz Ben Tifour

GK	1	(Algeria) Abderrahmane Boubekeur
	?	(Algeria) Nouredine Mazari
	?	(Algeria) Boualem Atbi
	?	(Algeria) Ahmed Maârouf
	?	(Algeria) Naâmane
	?	(Algeria) Ali Azzouz
	?	(Algeria) Ahmed Lâagoun
	?	(Algeria) Abdeldjalil Dahmoune
FW	?	(Algeria) Omar Hahad (c)
FW	?	(Algeria) Amokrane Oualiken
	?	(Algeria) Zidane
Manager :
(Algeria) Saïd Haddad

Assistant referees:
Benjadi

Fourth official:

Match rules
- 90 minutes.
