= 1969–70 USM Alger season =

USM Alger
1969–70 season
- President: Abdelkader Amrani
- Head coach: Hamid Belamine
- Stadium: Stade Omar Hammadi
- National I: 5th
- Algerian Cup: Runners–up
- Maghreb Cup Winners Cup: Runners–up
- Top goalscorer: League: Kamel Tchalabi (10 goals); All: Kamel Tchalabi (11 goals)
Home colours	Away colours

In the 1969–70 season, USM Alger is competing in the Nationale I for the 4th season, as well as the Maghreb Cup Winners Cup, the Algerian Cup. They will be competing in Championnat National, the Maghreb Cup Winners Cup and the Algerian Cup. In the Maghreb Cup Winners Cup and in his first participation, USM Alger managed to reach the final, where he was defeated against the Moroccan landowner RS Settat the champion of Coupe du Trône with a single goal, In the Algerian Cup the club reached the final for the second time in a row against the same team CR Belcourt. Like the first final the two teams after a draw The match was replayed and where ending in a 4–1 victory to CR Belcourt again.

== Squad list ==
Players and squad numbers last updated on 1 September 1969.
Note: Flags indicate national team as has been defined under FIFA eligibility rules. Players may hold more than one non-FIFA nationality.

Nat.	Position	Name	Date of birth (age)	Signed from
(Algeria)	GK	Djamel El Okbi	15 October 1939 (aged 30)	(France) AS Saint Eugène
(Algeria)	GK	Sid Ahmed Zebaïri	13 November 1948 (aged 21)	(Algeria) Youth system
(Algeria)	GK	Mehdi Cerbah	3 January 1953 (aged 16)	(Algeria) Youth system
(Algeria)	DF	Mohamed Kamel Zmit	9 February 1949 (aged 20)	(Algeria) Youth system
(Algeria)	DF	Djaffar Azzoug	24 March 1948 (aged 21)	
(Algeria)	DF	Abdelhamid Moudjeb	6 August 1943 (aged 26)	
(Algeria)	DF	Abdelhamid Berrahma	2 May 1950 (aged 19)	(Algeria) Youth system
(Algeria)	DF	Mohamed Madani	2 March 1939 (aged 30)	
(Algeria)	LB	Rachid Debbah	23 March 1948 (aged 21)	
(Algeria)	MF	Ahmed Zitoun	16 August 1936 (aged 33)	
(Algeria)	MF	Saïd Allik	24 April 1948 (aged 21)	(Algeria) Youth system
(Algeria)	MF	Ahmed Lakhdar Attoui	20 September 1948 (aged 21)	(Algeria) USM Annaba
(Algeria)	MF	Mouldi Aïssaoui	26 July 1946 (aged 23)	(Algeria) JBAC Annaba
(Algeria)	DF	Boubekeur Belbekri	7 January 1942 (aged 27)	(France) Gallia d’Alger
(Algeria)	MF	Abdelkader Saâdi	24 February 1948 (aged 21)	
(Algeria)	MF	Lakhdar Guitton	17 December 1939 (aged 30)	
(Algeria)	FW	Abderrahmane Meziani	12 May 1942 (aged 27)	(France) AS Saint Eugène
(Algeria)	FW	Hamid Bernaoui	3 December 1937 (aged 32)	(Algeria) Youth system
(Algeria)	FW	Kamel Tchalabi	24 April 1947 (aged 22)	(Algeria) OM Saint Eugènoise
(Algeria)	FW	Belkacem Mokdadi	9 July 1944 (aged 25)	(Algeria) MS Cherchell

== Pre-season and friendlies ==
21 September 1969 Friendly	MC Alger	2–0	USM Alger	Bologhine
	Zenir 31'; Bachi 82'			Stadium: Omar Hamadi Stadium
Note: Lineup for USM Alger - Zebairi, Moudjeb, Belbekri, Saâdi, Berrahma, Allik, Zitoun, Bernaoui, Attoui Ahmed (Chalabi), Meziani, Mokdadi (Azzouz).

== Competitions ==
=== Overview ===
Competition	Record								Started round	Final position / round	First match	Last match
Competition	G	W	D	L	GF	GA	GD	Win %	Started round	Final position / round	First match	Last match
National I	22	7	7	8	34	32	+2	31.82	—N/a	5th	5 October 1969	10 May 1970
Algerian Cup	8	4	3	1	16	8	+8	50.00	Round of 32	Runners–up	18 January 1970	24 June 1970
Maghreb Cup Winners Cup	2	1	0	1	2	2	+0	50.00	Semi-final	Runners–up	20 December 1969	21 December 1969
Total	32	12	10	10	52	42	+10	37.50				

=== Nationale I ===
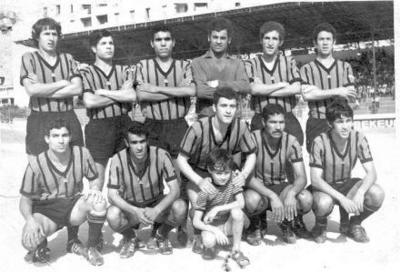
USM Alger 1969–70 with From Left to Right: Stand Up : Abdouche - Berahma - Saadi - Zebairi - Debbah - Belbekri. Sitting Tchalabi - Allik - Meziani - Zitoune - Aïssaoui.

==== League table ====
Pos	Team	Pld	W	D	L	GF	GA	GD	Pts
3	CCS Kouba	22	9	4	9	39	32	+7	44
4	ES Guelma	22	7	8	7	32	42	−10	44
5	USM Alger	22	7	7	8	34	32	+2	43
6	JS Kabylie	22	7	7	8	28	30	−2	43
7	MC Oran	22	8	4	10	25	31	−6	42

Source: rsssf.com

==== Results by round ====
Round	1	2	3	4	5	6	7	8	9	10	11	12	13	14	15	16	17	18	19	20	21	22
Ground	H	A	H	A	H	A	H	A	H	A	H	A	H	A	H	A	H	A	H	A	H	A
Result	W	W	D	W	W	L	D	D	D	L	D	L	W	W	W	D	L	L	L	D	W	L
Position																						

Source: Competitive matches
A = Away; H = Home; W = Win; D = Draw; L = Loss

=== Matches ===
Win Draw Loss

5 October 1969 Round 1	USM Alger	3–2	MC Oran	Bologhine
	Tchalabi 26', 85'; Meziani 51', , , , , , , , , ,		Mehdi 20'; Fréha 68', , , , , , , , , ,	Stadium: Omar Hamadi Stadium

12 October 1969 Round 2	NA Hussein Dey	0–2	USM Alger	Hussein Dey
	, , , , , , , , , ,		, , , , , , , , , ,	Stadium: Zioui Brothers Stadium

19 October 1969 Round 3	USM Alger	3–3	USM Annaba (Note: USM Annaba mentioned in this article is a club founded in 1944 now called HAMRA Annaba. Not to be confused with the current USM Annaba, a club based in the same city but founded in 1983.)	Bologhine
	, , , , , , , , , ,		, , , , , , , , , ,	Stadium: Omar Hamadi Stadium

26 October 1969 Round 4	ES Sétif	1–2	USM Alger	Sétif
	, , , , , , , , , ,		, , , , , , , , , ,	Stadium: Stade Mohamed Guessab

9 November 1969 Round 5	USM Alger	2–0	JS Kabylie	Bologhine
	Meziani ?'; Aissaoui ?', , , , , , , , , ,		, , , , , , , , , ,	Stadium: Omar Hamadi Stadium

16 November 1969 Round 6	MC Alger	2–1	USM Alger	Bologhine
	Amrous Tayeb 40'; Tahir Hassen 74'; Betrouni (red card) 74'; Cheikh (red card) 74' Zerga, Amrous Sadek, Cheikh, Maloufi, Mekidèche (c), Zenir, Betrouni, Bachi (Bachta), Amrous Tayeb, Tahir Hassen, Zerroug - Coach: Khabatou Smail		Debbah (red card) 74'; Meziani (red card) 74'; Tchalabi 89' Zebaïri, Berrahma, Debbah, Saâdi, Belbekri, Guittoun, Tchalabi, Allik Saïd (Attoui Ahmed), Meziani, Zitoun, Aïssaoui - Coach: Lekehal Ahmed Tedjini.	Stadium: Omar Hamadi Stadium; Referee: Mohamed Benghezal

23 November 1969 Round 7	USM Alger	1–1	CCS Kouba	Bologhine
	, , , , , , , , , ,		, , , , , , , , , ,	Stadium: Omar Hamadi Stadium

7 December 1969 Round 8	ES Guelma	1–1	USM Alger	Guelma
	Chekati 42', , , , , , , , , ,		Aissaoui 44', , , , , , , , , ,

14 December 1969 Round 9	USM Alger	1–1	USM Bel-Abbès	Bologhine
	Saadi 14', , , , , , , , , ,		Maggi 57', , , , , , , , , ,	Stadium: Omar Hamadi Stadium

28 December 1969 Round 10	JS Djidjelli	2–0	USM Alger	[[]]
	, , , , , , , , , ,		, , , , , , , , , ,

4 January 1970 Round 11	USM Alger	2–2	CR Belcourt	Bologhine
	Meziani 85', 90' Zebaïri, Allik, Debbah, Ahmed Lakhdar Attoui, Berrahma, Zitoun, Belbekri, Aïssaoui, Bernaoui, Tchalabi, Meziani		Lalmas ?', ?', , , , , , , , , ,	Stadium: Omar Hamadi Stadium; Referee: Chihani

25 January 1970 Round 12	MC Oran	1–0	USM Alger	Oran
	Fréha 38', , , , , , , , , ,		, , , , , , , , , ,	Stadium: Ahmed Zabana Stadium

1 February 1970 Round 13	USM Alger	4–2	NA Hussein Dey	Bologhine
	, , , , , , , , , ,		, , , , , , , , , ,	Stadium: Omar Hamadi Stadium

8 February 1970 Round 14	USM Annaba	1–0	USM Alger	Annaba
	, , , , , , , , , ,		, , , , , , , , , ,	Stadium: Chabou Abdelkader Stadium

15 February 1970 Round 15	USM Alger	3–1	ES Sétif	Bologhine
	, , , , , , , , , ,		, , , , , , , , , ,	Stadium: Omar Hamadi Stadium

1 March 1970 Round 16	JS Kabylie	1–1	USM Alger	Tizi Ouzou
	, , , , , , , , , ,		, , , , , , , , , ,	Stadium: Stade Oukil Ramdane

8 March 1970 Round 17	USM Alger	1–2	MC Alger	Bologhine
	Guittoun 27' Zebairi, Berrahma, Debbah, Saâdi, Zitoun, Belbekri, Tchalabi (Bernaoui), Guittoun, Attoui Ahmed, Meziani, Aissaoui - Coach: Lekehal Ahmed Tedjini.		Amoura Mesbah 3'; Zerroug 77', , , , , , , , , ,	Stadium: Omar Hamadi Stadium; Referee: Bourezgui, Smad, Lemnouar (Morocco)

15 March 1970 Round 18	CSS Kouba	3–2	USM Alger	Kouba
	, , , , , , , , , ,		, , , , , , , , , ,	Stadium: Omar Benhaddad Stadium

12 April 1970 Round 19	USM Alger	1–2	ES Guelma	Bologhine
	, , , , , , , , , ,		, , , , , , , , , ,	Stadium: Omar Hamadi Stadium

19 April 1970 Round 20	USM Bel Abbès	0–0	USM Alger	Sidi Bel Abbès
	, , , , , , , , , ,		, , , , , , , , , ,	Stadium: Stade des trois frères Amarouch

3 May 1970 Round 21	USM Alger	4–2	JS Djidjelli	Bologhine
	, , , , , , , , , ,		, , , , , , , , , ,	Stadium: Omar Hamadi Stadium

10 May 1970 Round 22	CR Belcourt	2–0	USM Alger	Belcourt
	, , , , , , , , , ,		, , , , , , , , , ,	Stadium: Stade d'El Annasser

=== Algerian Cup ===
18 January 1970 Round of 32	USM Alger	4–0	AS Ain M'lila	Tizi Ouzou
				Stadium: Stade Oukil Ramdane

22 February 1970 Round of 16	USM Annaba	0–4	USM Alger	Constantine
			34', 35' Meziani; 49' Aïssaoui; 69' Attoui	Stadium: Stade Ben Abdelmalek

24 May 1970 QF first leg	JS Kabylie	2–2	USM Alger	Bologhine
				Stadium: Stade communal de Bologhine
Note: Lineup for USM Alger -

30 May 1970 QF second leg	USM Alger	3–1	JS Kabylie	Algiers
				Stadium: Stade d'El Anasser
Note: Lineup for USM Alger -

7 June 1970 SF first leg	ES Mostaganem	0–1	USM Alger	Oran
			28' Meziani	Stadium: Stade 19 juin 1965
Note: Lineup for USM Alger -

14 June 1970 SF Second leg	USM Alger	0–0	ES Mostaganem	Algiers
				Stadium: Stade d'El Anasser
Note: Lineup for USM Alger -

20 June 1970 Final	CR Belcourt	1–1 (a.e.t.)	USM Alger	Algiers
	Kalem 5'	Report	54' Tchalabi	Stadium: Stade El Annasser; Attendance: 15,000; Referee: Mohandi
Note: Lineup for USM Alger - Zebaïri, Berrahma, A. Saadi, Belbekri, Debbah, Abdouche, Zitoun, Guittoun (Bernaoui), Chalabi, Meziani, Aïssaoui

28 June 1970 Replay	USM Alger	1–4	CR Belcourt	Bologhine
	Zitoune 39'	Report	32', 60' Kalem; 75', 78' Lalmas	Stadium: Stade communal de Bologhine; Attendance: 16,000; Referee: Mohamed Benghezal
Note: Lineup for USM Alger - Zebaïri, – Berrahma, A. Saadi, Belbekri, Debbah, Abdouche, Bernaoui, Guittoun, Zitoun (Allik), Meziani, Aïssaoui

=== Maghreb Cup Winners Cup ===
20 December 1969 Semi-final	USM Alger (Algeria)	2–1	(Libya) Al-Hilal SC	Casablanca
	Lakhdar Guitoun 29'; Ahmed Attoui 33'	Report	Abdeljalil Hachani 31'	Stadium: Stade d'honneur de Settat; Attendance: 8,000; Referee: Moncef Ben Ali (Tunisia)
Note: Lineup for USM Alger - Zebairi, Berrahma, Zitoun, Bebekri, Debbah, Saadi, Guittoun, Tchalabi, Meziani, Attoui, Aissaoui - Coach Hamid Belamine.

21 December 1969 Final	RS Settat (Morocco)	1–0	(Algeria) USM Alger	Casablanca
	Maati Khezzar 84'	Report		Stadium: Stade d'honneur de Settat; Referee: Abderrazak Bessaoudia (Tunisia)
Note: Lineup for USM Alger - Zebairi, Berrahma, Zitoun, Belbekri, Debbah, Saadi (Allik), Guittoun, Tchalabi, Meziani, Attoui, Aissaoui - Coach Hamid Belamine.

== Squad information ==
=== Playing statistics ===
No.	Pos	Nat	Player	Total		National		Algerian Cup		Maghreb Winners Cup	
No.	Pos	Nat	Player	Apps	Goals	Apps	Goals	Apps	Goals	Apps	Goals
-	GK	(Algeria) ALG	Sid Ahmed Zebaïri	6	0	2	0	2	0	2	0
-	GK	(Algeria) ALG	Djamel El Okbi	0	0	0	0	0	0	0	0
-	GK	(Algeria) ALG	Mehdi Cerbah	0	0	0	0	0	0	0	0
-	DF	(Algeria) ALG	Mohamed Kamel Zmit	0	0	0	0	0	0	0	0
-	DF	(Algeria) ALG	Djaffar Azzoug	0	0	0	0	0	0	0	0
-	DF	(Algeria) ALG	Abdelhamid Moudjeb	0	0	0	0	0	0	0	0
-	DF	(Algeria) ALG	Boubekeur Belbekri	6	0	2	0	2	0	2	0
-	DF	(Algeria) ALG	Abdelhamid Berrahma	6	0	2	0	2	0	2	0
-	DF	(Algeria) ALG	Mohamed Madani	0	0	0	0	0	0	0	0
-	DF	(Algeria) ALG	Rachid Debbah	6	0	2	0	2	0	2	0
-	DF	(Algeria) ALG	Abdelkader Saadi	6	0	2	0	2	0	2	0
-	MF	(Algeria) ALG	Lakhder Guittoun	6	2	2	1	2	0	2	1
-	MF	(Algeria) ALG	Saïd Allik	3	0	1	0	1	0	1	0
-	MF	(Algeria) ALG	Ahmed Zitoun	6	1	2	0	2	1	2	0
-	MF	(Algeria) ALG	Réda Abdouche	2	0	0	0	2	0	0	0
-	FW	(Algeria) ALG	Ahmed Lakhdar Attoui	4	1	2	0	0	0	2	1
-	FW	(Algeria) ALG	Mouldi Aïssaoui	6	0	2	0	2	0	2	0
-	FW	(Algeria) ALG	Kamel Tchalabi	5	2	2	1	1	1	2	0
-	FW	(Algeria) ALG	Abderrahmane Meziani	6	0	2	0	2	0	2	0
-	FW	(Algeria) ALG	Hamid Bernaoui	3	0	1	0	2	0	0	0
-	FW	(Algeria) ALG	Belkacem Mokdadi	0	0	0	0	0	0	0	0

Last updated: 13 June 1971
Source: Competitions

=== Goalscorers ===
Includes all competitive matches. The list is sorted alphabetically by surname when total goals are equal.

Nat.	Player	Pos.	N 1	AC	MCWC	TOTAL
(Algeria)	Kamel Tchalabi	FW	10	1	0	11
(Algeria)	Abderrahmane Meziani	FW	2	1	0	3
(Algeria)	Lakhder Guittoun	MF	1	0	1	2
(Algeria)	Mouldi Aïssaoui	MF	2	0	0	2
(Algeria)	Abdelkader Saadi	DF	1	0	0	1
(Algeria)	Ahmed Zitoun	MF	0	1	0	1
(Algeria)	Ahmed Lakhdar Attoui	MF	0	0	1	1
Own Goals			0	0	0	0
Totals			34	16	2	52
