= Football at the 1965 All-Africa Games – Men's team squads =

Below are the squads for the football competition at the 1965 All-Africa Games, hosted by Brazzaville, Congo, which took place between 19 and 25 July 1965.

== Group 1 ==
=== Mali ===
Head coach:

No.	Pos.	Player	Date of birth (age)	Club
	MF	Kidian Diallo		(Malian Football Federation) Djoliba AC
	FW	Salif "Domingo" Keïta	8 December 1946 (aged 18)	(Malian Football Federation) Stade Malien
	FW	Karounga Keïta	22 August 1941 (aged 23)	(French Football Federation) Girondins de Bordeaux
	FW	Idrissa "Nani" Touré		(Malian Football Federation) Stade Malien
	GK	Yacouba Samabaly		(Malian Football Federation) Stade Malien
	MF	Ousmane Traoré		
	DF	Bogobali Konipo		
	MF	Moriba Dembélé		
	DF	Hamidou Doumbia		
	FW	Bassory Diarra		
	MF	Cheickna "Kollo" Traoré		
	FW	Mamadou "Doudou" Diakité	2 June 1939 (aged 26)	(Malian Football Federation) Stade Malien
	DF	Mamadou Kaloga		
	MF	Labass Diakité		
	MF	Abdoul Karim "Bacoun" Touré		
	MF	Tiémoko Sinaté		(Malian Football Federation) Stade Malien
	FW	Seydou Tall		
	DF	Seydou N’Daou		
	GK	Sidy Diarra		

== Group 2 ==
=== Algeria ===
Head coach: Abderrahman Ibrir

No.	Pos.	Player	Date of birth (age)	Club
	GK	Abdelkader "Zerga" Ghalem	27 April 1938 (aged 27)	(Algerian Football Federation) MC Alger
	GK	Mohamed Nassou	4 October 1937 (aged 27)	(Algerian Football Federation) CR Belcourt
	DF	Messaoud Melaksou	21 August 1941 (aged 23)	(Algerian Football Federation) MSP Batna
	DF	Messaoud Beloucif	30 November 1940 (aged 24)	(Algerian Football Federation) AS Khroub
	DF	Abdelkader Ould Bey	23 June 1936 (aged 29)	(Algerian Football Federation) ES Mostaganem
	DF	Charef Zidane	5 February 1942 (aged 23)	(Algerian Football Federation) ES Mostaganem
	DF	Ali Attoui	21 January 1942 (aged 23)	(Algerian Football Federation) Hamra Annaba
	DF	Lahouari Beddiar	29 March 1936 (aged 29)	(Algerian Football Federation) MC Oran
	MF	Zoubir Aouadj	14 December 1940 (aged 24)	(Algerian Football Federation) MC Alger
	MF	Hacène Lalmas	12 March 1943 (aged 22)	(Algerian Football Federation) CR Belcourt
	MF	Abdelhamid Salhi	27 August 1947 (aged 17)	(Algerian Football Federation) ES Sétif
	MF	Abdelkrim Zefzef	9 January 1938 (aged 27)	(Algerian Football Federation) MO Constantine
	MF	Abdelkader Saâdi	24 February 1946 (aged 19)	(Algerian Football Federation) USM Alger
	FW	Noureddine Hachouf	10 May 1940 (aged 25)	(Algerian Football Federation) ES Guelma
	FW	Kamel Beroudji	9 September 1945 (aged 19)	(Algerian Football Federation) OM Ruisseau
	FW	Amar Bourouba	23 March 1941 (aged 24)	(Algerian Football Federation) ES Sétif
	FW	Othmane Bendida	1 March 1943 (aged 22)	(Algerian Football Federation) ASM Oran
	FW	Mohamed Bouhizeb	27 May 1942 (aged 23)	(Algerian Football Federation) SCM Oran
