= 1964–65 Algerian Championnat National =

Algerian Championnat National
- Season: 1964–65
- Dates: 13 September 1964 – 3 July 1965
- Champions: CR Belcourt
- Relegated: MC Alger; JSM Tiaret; USM Alger
- Matches: 240
- Goals: 592 (2.47 per match)
- Top goalscorer: Hocine Saadi (21 goals)
- Biggest home win: CR Belcourt 8 - 1 MO Constantine
- Biggest away win: USM Annaba 0 - 8 CR Belcourt
- Highest scoring: CR Belcourt 8 - 1 MO Constantine

The 1964–65 Algerian Championnat National was the third season of the Algerian Championnat National since its establishment in 1962. A total of 16 teams contested the league, with USM Annaba as the defending champions.

== Team summaries ==
=== Promotion and relegation ===
Teams promoted from Algerian Division 2 1964-1965

- SCM Oran
- RC Kouba
- JSM Skikda

Teams relegated to Algerian Division 2 1965-1966

- MC Alger
- JSM Tiaret
- USM Alger

== League table ==
Pos	Team	Pld	W	D	L	GF	GA	GD	Pts
1	CR Belcourt	30	19	4	7	68	25	+43	72
2	MSP Batna	30	16	7	7	40	19	+21	69
3	ES Guelma	30	13	9	8	43	43	0	65
4	NA Hussein Dey	30	13	8	9	38	33	+5	64
5	ES Sétif	30	12	8	10	30	27	+3	62
6	MC Oran	30	12	7	11	40	43	−3	61
7	MC Saïda	30	8	13	9	40	46	−6	59
8	ES Mostaganem	30	11	7	12	35	42	−7	59
9	USM Sétif	30	9	10	11	29	32	−3	58
10	USM Blida	30	8	12	10	36	37	−1	57
11	ASM Oran	30	9	9	12	29	39	−10	57
12	USM Annaba	30	11	4	15	44	44	0	56
13	MO Constantine	30	9	8	13	34	51	−17	56
14	USM Alger	30	8	8	14	35	44	−9	54
15	MC Alger	30	8	8	14	39	46	−7	54
16	JSM Tiaret	30	7	10	13	30	39	−9	54

Source: rsssf.com

== Season statistics ==
=== Top scorers ===
R.	Goalscorer	Team	Goals
1	(Algeria) Hocine Saâdi	NA Hussein Dey	19
1	(Algeria) Messaoud Koussim	ES Sétif	19
1	(Algeria) Hassan Achour	CR Belcourt	19
4	(Algeria) Noureddine Hachouf	ES Guelma	18
5	(Algeria) Karim Hamida	MC Oran	13
5	(Algeria) Hacène Lalmas	CR Belcourt	13
7	(Algeria) Abderrahmane Meziani	USM Alger	11
8	(Algeria) Zoubir Aouedj	MC Alger	10
8	(Algeria) Abdelhakim Hadjou	USM Annaba	10
8	(Algeria) Mbarek Chenane	CR Belcourt	10
8	(Algeria) Souidi Benaïssa	JSM Tiaret	10
8	(Algeria) Abdelkader Reguig	ASM Oran	10

=== Hat-tricks ===
Player	For	Against	Result	Date	Ref
(Algeria) Abderrahmane Meziani	USM Alger	MC Saida	4–0	21 February 1965	
(Algeria) Noureddine Hachouf	ES Guelma	MC Saida	3–2	28 February 1965	
(Algeria) Hacène Lalmas	CR Belcourt	MO Constantine	8–1	4 April 1965	
