= Freddy Zemmour =

French footballer (born 1942)

Personal information
- Date of birth: 21 February 1942 (age 84)
- Place of birth: Algiers, French Algeria
- Position: Midfielder

Youth career
- 1951–1957: Gallia d'Alger

Senior career*
Years	Team	Apps	(Gls)
1957–1962	Gallia d'Alger	–	(–)
1962–1968	USM Alger	–	(–)
- * Club domestic league appearances and goals

Freddy Zemmour (born 21 February 1942) is an Algerian former professional footballer who played as a midfielder.

== Career ==
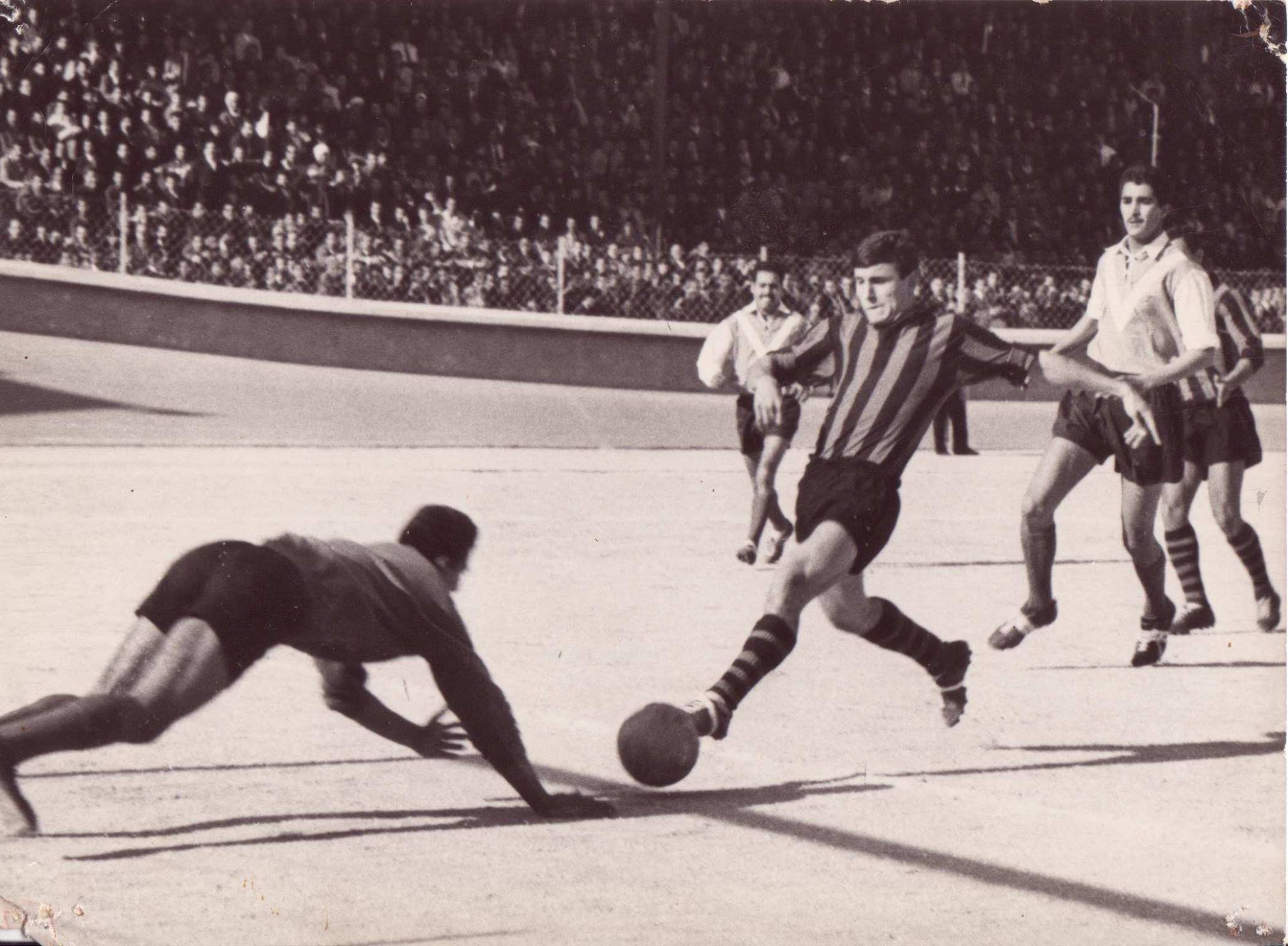
Freddy Zemmour, the Jewish Algerian player was part of the USM Alger team that won the first ever edition of the Algerian Championnat in 1962–63.

Freddy Zemmour began playing football at the age of nine with Gallia Sports Algérois and was Algiers Department Champion in the three categories, Minimes, Cadets and Juniors. He spent his first senior year at Gallia d'Alger in 1961–62. That year, he played with Achour Salah, Ghazi Djermane, Abdelghani Zitouni, Nassou and Boubekeur Belbekri. After the independence of Algeria became a soldier in the French army in El Harrach, Belbekri who played with him in Gallia d'Alger and during his visit to his mother to ask him to join him at the USM Alger, at Bologhine stadium. At that time, come out regularly from the military barracks to see his mother One day he went to train with USM Alger and was greeted by his friend Belbekri and coach Abdelaziz Ben Tifour. In the 1962–63 season, Zemmour won his only title with USM Alger after winning the National 1 final against MC Alger 3–0.

Later in 1964, Zemmour told his coach Ben Tifour that he wanted to become a professional player in France, His answer was clear "I will talk about you at Nice but I warn you, prepare to eat black bread" But Nice's answer was that he did not need a midfielder at the time so he stayed with USM Alger. In 1964 in a match in Batna, Zemmour was attacked by one of the players in the locker room but all his teammates protected him It was the only time he was subjected to a racist incident because he was French and Jewish religion, two things that are very sensitive in Algeria so far. In one of his statements he said "My decision to leave USM Alger and Algeria was not easy to make. But I have always been a "man of duty", and I had to focus on my professional career for the well being of my wife and children".

== Personal life ==
Freddy Zemmour was born on 21 February 1942 in Algiers, at 9 rue Adolphe Blasselle, in Belcourt. He got married on 24 October 1964 at the Consulate of France in Algiers. He then lived in 22 bd Bougara until August 1968, after which he left to France. On 18 January 1965 his son Bruno was born in Algiers, clinical Avenue Claude Debussy. His daughter, Sandrine, was born on 30 January 1969 in St Maur des Fosses (Paris region). Zemmour left Algeria in 1968 because Freddy and his wife wanted to get closer to their families who had left Algeria between 62 and 68.

== Career statistics ==
Appearances and goals by club, season and competition
Club	Season	League			Cup		Total	
Club	Season	Division	Apps	Goals	Apps	Goals	Apps	Goals
USM Alger	1962–63	Critériums d'Honneur						
USM Alger	1963–64	Division d'Honneur						
USM Alger	1964–65	National						
USM Alger	1965–66	Division d'Honneur	15	0	2	0	17	0
USM Alger	1966–67	Nationale II		4		1		5
USM Alger	1967–68	Nationale II		1		0		1
USM Alger	Total		0	0	0	0	0	0
Career total			0	0	0	0	0	0

== Honours ==
USM Alger

- Championnat National: 1962–63
