= Rebih =

Rebih is a surname. Notable people with the surname include:

- Aboubaker Rebih (born 1983), Algerian footballer
- Krimo Rebih (1932–2012), Algerian footballer
