= 1962–63 Algerian Cup =

كأس الجزائر

Tournament details
- Country: Algeria

Final positions
- Champions: ES Sétif (1)
- Runners-up: ES Mostaganem

The 1962–63 Algerian Cup was the first edition of the Algerian Cup. ES Sétif defeated ES Mostaganem in the final. The teams tied 1-1 in their first match, but ESS won the replay 2-0.

== Round of 32 ==
Tie no	Home team	Score	Away team
1	USM Alger	2–0	JS El Biar
2	E. Sour El Ghozlane	0–1	RC Arba
3	WA Boufarik	0–0 (a.e.t.)	CR Belcourt
4	ES Maison-Carrée	3–2 (a.e.t.)	NA Hussein Dey
5	US Hôpital d'Alger	0–2	USM Blida
6	ES Sétif	3–0	CA Batna
7	JSM Skikda	2–0	AS Bône
8	Hamra Annaba	1–0	CA Bordj Bou Arreridj
9	MC El Eulma	3–1	JBAC Annaba
10	US Chaouia	2–2	MSP Batna
11	USM Sétif	–	n/a
12	ES Mostaganem	5–1	SS La Marsa
13	MC Saïda	2–1	GC Mascara
14	MC Oran	–	
15	RC Relizane	–	
16	USM Bel-Abbès	–	

== Round of 16 ==
18 January 1963	ES Sétif	3 – 1	RC Relizane	Constantine
				Stadium: Stade Ben Abdelmalek

18 January 1963	ES Mostaganem	1 – 0	MC Saint Arnaud

18 January 1963	MC Oran	2 – 0	RC Arbaâ	Oran
				Stadium: Stade Municipal

18 January 1963	USM Alger	2 – 1	USM Bel-Abbès

18 January 1963	USM Sétif	4 – 0	USM Blida

18 January 1963	JSM Philipeville	2 – 1	WA Boufarik

18 January 1963	MC Saïda	2 – 1	USM Bône

18 January 1963	ES Maison-Carrée	1 – 2	US Canrobert d/q

== Quarter-finals ==
3 March 1963	ES Sétif	2 – 1	MC Oran	Constantine
				Stadium: Stade Ben Abdelmalek

3 March 1963	USM Alger	3 – 2 (a.e.t.)	JSM Skikda

3 March 1963	ES Mostaganem	2 – 0	ES Maison Carrée	Oran
				Stadium: Stade Municipal

3 March 1963	USM Sétif	1 – 0	MC Saïda	Constantine
				Stadium: Stade Ben Abdelmalek

== Semi-finals ==
31 March 1963	ES Sétif	4 – 2 (a.e.t.)	USM Alger	Constantine
	Kharchi 79'; Khemicha 90', 96'; Koussim 106'		11' Meziani; 23' Bernaoui	Stadium: Stade Ben Abdelmalek

31 March 1963	ES Mostaganem	1 – 0	USM Sétif	Oran
	Ould el-Bey 117'			Stadium: Stade Municipal

== Final ==
=== Match ===
April 28, 1963
16 h 00

ES Sétif	1 – 1 (a.e.t.)	ES Mostaganem
Mattem 78'		45' Khellil

Stade d'El Anasser, Algiers
Attendance: 11.000
Referee: Khelifi

=== Replay ===
May 12, 1963
16 h 00
Replay

ES Sétif	2 – 0	ES Mostaganem
Koussim 33'; Mattem 88'

Stade d'El Anasser, Algiers
Attendance: 11.000
Referee: Khelifi
