= 1971 Algerian Cup final =

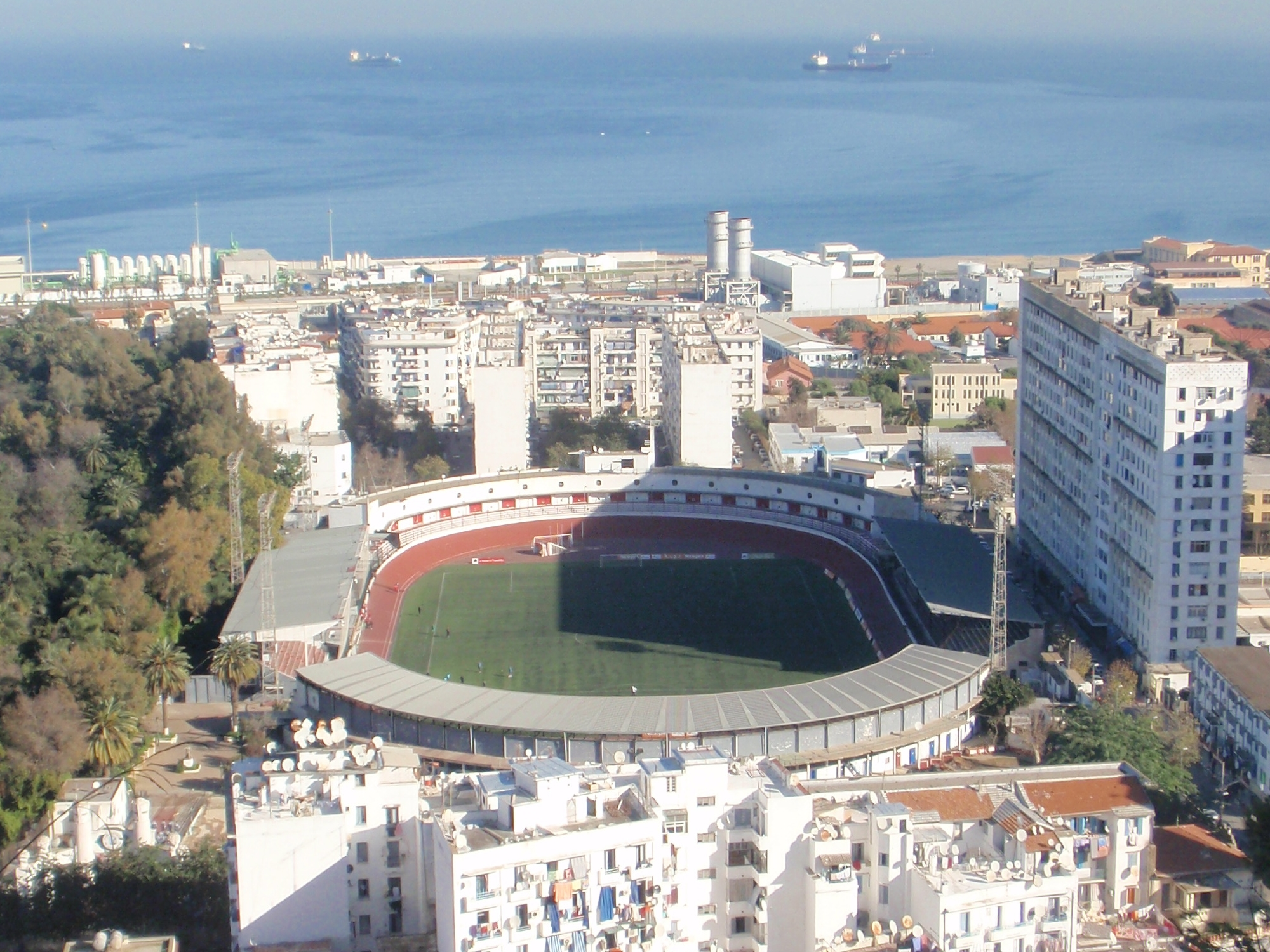
- 20 August 1955 Stadium hosted the match
- Event: 1970–71 Algerian Cup
USM Alger	MC Alger
0	2
- Date: June 13, 1971
- Venue: Stade 20 Août 1955, Algiers
- Attendance: 20.000

The 1971 Algerian Cup final was the 8th final of the Algerian Cup. The final took place on June 13, 1971, at Stade 20 Août 1955 in Algiers with kick-off at 15:00. MC Alger beat USM Alger 2–0 to win their first Algerian Cup.

== Pre-match ==
=== Pre-match ===
In anticipation of the 1971 Algerian Cup final, USM Alger had prepared this very important meeting in Palm Beach, in a site reserved for summer camps. The decision was made by then-president Abdelkader Amrani. As for his part, the Mouloudéen neighbor carried out his preparation on the Chiffa side, in a region which allows players to concentrate well.

Victory in the final for the Mouloudéens was priceless. It was a goal for the Greens and Reds to silence their usmist neighbors who teased them for not having won a title despite fifty years of existence. The Mouloudean leaders, like Derriche, Djazouli, Djaout and Balamane, had granted the players the bonus of 100 dinars each, as a consecration.

=== Summary ===
The 9th final in the history of the Algerian Cup brought the two neighbors, MC Alger to USM Alger at the Municipal Stadium (currently Stade 20 Août 1955) into battle. It was the first confrontation between the two teams in the Algerian Cup and the first final for Mouloudia d'Alger in history. On the other side, the Usmists had already taken part in two finals consecutively against CR Bélouizdad in 1969 and 1970. Among the Rouge et Noir, it was already an experienced team with the Allik, Belbekri, Aïssaoui, Saâdi, Meziani and others. On the green and red side, it was the youth with the Kaoua, Betrouni, Zenir, Bachta and many others. The will of the Mouloudéens made the difference against the experience of the Usmistes who lost this final, for the third time in a row.

The Greens and Reds, pushed by a large crowd, started the game with a bang. Barely five minutes past the inevitable Omar Betrouni manages to open the scoring for the benefit of the Mouloudéens and shake the usmist nets. Picked cold, the Red and Black will try to come back to score. They even created a few clear chances to score. But against the course of the game, Zoubir Bachi doubled the score at 36' bringing the Usmists to their knees. In the second half, the Red and Black dominated but the Mouloudéens managed the game until the referee's final whistle.

== Match details ==
June 13, 1971

USM Alger	0–2	MC Alger
	Report (in French)	5' Betrouni; 36' Bachi

Stade 20 Août 1955, Algiers
Attendance: 20.000

GK	1	(Algeria) Boukhalfa Branci
DF		(Algeria) Rachid Lala
DF		(Algeria) Mazouni
MF		(Algeria) Boubekeur Belbekri
DF	4	(Algeria) Abdelkader Saadi
FW	9	(Algeria) Ahmed Attoui	Substituted off
MF	7	(Algeria) Kamel Berroudji
DF		(Algeria) Saïd Allik
FW	10	(Algeria) Abderrahmane Meziani (c)
MF	11	(Algeria) Mouldi Aïssaoui
FW		(Algeria) Kamel Tchalabi
Substitutes :
DF		(Algeria) Réda Abdouche	Substituted on
Manager :
(Algeria) Ahmed Zitoun

GK	1	(Algeria) Abdennour Kaoua
DF	(Algeria) Sadek Amrous
(Algeria) Cheikh
(Algeria) Si Chaib
DF	(Algeria) Nacer Mekidèche
MF	(Algeria) Omar Betrouni
(Algeria) Anwar Bachta
MF	(Algeria) Tahir Hacène (c)
DF	(Algeria) Zenir Abdelwahab
MF	(Algeria) Maloufi	Substituted off
FW	(Algeria) Zoubir Bachi	Substituted off
Substitutes :
(Algeria) Zerroug	Substituted on
(Algeria) Tahir Hamid	Substituted on
Manager :
(Algeria) Ali Benfadah

MATCH OFFICIALS

- Assistant referees:
- Fourth official:

MATCH RULES

- 90 minutes.
- 30 minutes of extra-time if necessary.
- Penalty shootout if scores still level.
- Seven named substitutes.
- Maximum of three substitutions.
