= 1968–69 Algerian Cup =

كأس الجزائر

Tournament details
- Country: Algeria

Final positions
- Champions: CR Belcourt (1)
- Runners-up: USM Alger

The 1968–69 Algerian Cup was the 6th edition of the Algerian Cup (Arabic: كأس الجزائر). CR Belouizdad (then known as CR Belcourt) won the cup by defeating USM Alger in the final replay. The teams tied 1-1 in their first match, but CRB won the replay 5-3 after extra time.

ES Sétif were the defending champions, but they lost to NA Hussein Dey in the Round of 16.

== Round of 16 ==
22 February 1969	JSM Tiaret	0–1	CR Belcourt	Stade 19 juin 1965, Oran
			1' Boudjenoune

22 February 1969	US Biskra	1–3	USM Alger	Stade Seffouhi, Batna

22 February 1969	RC Kouba	3–0	CC Sig	Stade d'El Anasser, Algiers

22 February 1969	NA Hussein Dey	3–1	ES Sétif	Stade Saint Eugéne, Algiers

23 February 1969	ES Guelma	0–2	MC Oran	Stade Ben Abdelmalek, Constantine

23 February 1969	RC Relizane	1–0	USM Blida	Stade 19 juin 1965, Oran

23 February 1969	CA Bordj Bou Arreridj	0–1	MC Alger	Stade Mohamed Guessab, Sétif
			Maloufi 56'

23 February 1969	WA Boufarik	1–0	USH Constantine	Stade Mohamed Reggaz, Boufarik

== Quarter-finals ==
6 April 1969	CR Belcourt	1–0	WA Boufarik

20 April 1969	USM Alger	1–0	RC Kouba

20 April 1969	MC Oran	2–0	MC Alger	Stade 19 juin 1965, Oran
	Fréha 32'; Nair 60'			Referee: Benchriet

20 April 1969	NA Hussein Dey	2–1	RC Relizane

== Semi-finals ==
11 May 1969	CR Belcourt	1–1	MC Oran
	Achour 30'		Nehari 47'

28 May 1969 Replay	CR Belcourt	2–0	MC Oran
	Djemaa 44'; Lalmas 84'

11 May 1969	USM Alger	1–0	NA Hussein Dey

== Final ==
=== Match ===
June 8, 1969
16 h 00

CR Belcourt	1–1	USM Alger
Messahel 20'		90' Saadi

Stade d'El Anasser, Algiers

=== Replay ===
June 12, 1969
16 h 00
Replay

CR Belcourt	5–3	USM Alger
Lalmas 4', 100', 116'; Khalem 65'; Achour 95' (pen.)		52', 88' Bernaoui; 115' Meziani

Stade d'El Anasser, Algiers
