= Mohamed Bouhizeb =

Algerian footballer (1942-1996)

Personal information
- Date of birth: 27 May 1942
- Place of birth: Oran, Algeria
- Date of death: 1996
- Place of death: Oran, Algeria
- Position: Striker

Senior career*
Years	Team	Apps	(Gls)
1960–1968	SCM Oran		
1968–1978	MC Oran		

International career
1963–1966	Algeria	3	(0)
- * Club domestic league appearances and goals

Mohamed Bouhizeb (27 May 1942 – 1996; Arabic: محمد بوحيزب) was an Algerian footballer who played as a striker. An Algerian international, he played for SCM Oran and MC Oran at club level.

== Honours ==
MC Oran

- Algerian Championnat National: 1971
- Algerian Cup: 1975

Algeria

- All-Africa Games fourth place: 1965
