= Rachid Aftouche =

Algerian footballer (born 1933)

Personal information
- Full name: Rachid Aftouche
- Date of birth: 2 November 1933
- Place of birth: Algiers, French Algeria
- Position: Defender

Senior career*
Years	Team	Apps	(Gls)
19??–19??	Gallia sport d'Alger		
19??–19??	MC Alger		
19??–19??	Rama		
19??–19??	ASP Télégraphes Téléphones Alger		
19??–19??	Croissant Club Alger		
19??–19??	USMM Hadjout		
19??–19??	Olympique de Tizi-Ouzou		
1962–19??	USM Alger		

International career
1963	Algeria	1	(0)
- * Club domestic league appearances and goals

Rachid Aftouche (born 2 November 1933) was a professional Algerian footballer who played as a defender.

== Honours ==
  - Championnat National
    - Winner: 1962-63
