= Hacène Djemaâ =

Algerian footballer (born 1942)

Personal information
- Date of birth: 6 January 1942 (age 84)
- Place of birth: Algiers, Algeria
- Position: Midfielder

International career
Years	Team	Apps	(Gls)
1966–1968	Algeria	10	(1)

Hacène Djemaâ (born 6 January 1942) is an Algerian footballer. He played in ten matches for the Algeria national football team from 1966 to 1968.

== Career ==
He was also named in Algeria's squad for the 1968 African Cup of Nations tournament.
