= Messaoud Koussim =

Algerian footballer (born 1941)

Personal information
- Full name: Messaoud Koussim
- Date of birth: February 6, 1941 (age 85)
- Place of birth: Sétif, Algeria
- Position: Forward

Youth career
- –1958: USFM Sétif

Senior career*
Years	Team	Apps	(Gls)
1958–1977	ES Sétif		
- * Club domestic league appearances and goals

Messaoud «Saoudi» Koussim (Arabic: مسعود كوسيم, born February 6, 1941) is a retired Algerian football player who spent his entire senior playing career with ES Sétif. He was a member of the team that won the league-cup double in the 1967–68 season. He went on to become president of ES Sétif from 1972 to 1977, despite still playing for the team. During his time with ES Sétif, he won the league title once, and the Algerian Cup three times, scoring in the 1967 and 1968 finals.

He also played for the Algeria national team, featuring in two unofficial friendlies against Olympique de Marseille and FC La Chaux-de-Fonds.

Koussim is the father of Algerian film director and screenwriter Yanis Koussim.

== Honours ==
- ES Sétif
  - Algerian Championnat National: 1967–68
  - Algerian Cup: 1962–63, 1966–67, 1967–68
