= Krimo Rebih =

Algerian footballer (1932-2012)

Personal information
- Full name: Abdelkrim Ben Rebih
- Date of birth: 1 May 1932
- Place of birth: Casbah, Algiers, Algeria
- Date of death: 6 October 2012 (aged 80)
- Place of death: Algiers, Algeria
- Position: Forward

Senior career*
Years	Team	Apps	(Gls)
1948–1953	USM Alger	–	(–)
1954–1955	CS Hammam-Lif	–	(–)
1957–1962	US Tunisienne	–	(–)
1962–1970	USM Alger	–	(–)
- * Club domestic league appearances and goals

Krimo Rebih (1 May 1932 – 6 October 2012) is a former Algerian footballer who mainly played as a forward. He is best known for his spells with USM Alger and the Tunisian club CS Hammam-Lif, as well as for his involvement in football activities connected to the Algerian nationalist movement during the Algerian War of Independence.

== Early life and beginnings ==
Born in the Casbah of Algiers and raised in a modest family, Rebih discovered football in the streets of his neighborhood. He first played for Djenane El Goubi before signing his first license with the Ideal Club Musulman d'Alger. After impressing during trials at Stade Marcel Cerdan, he joined the first team of USM Alger at the age of 17. Krimo played for the club between 1948 and 1952 before being called up for military service in France, where he played for corporate teams in Belfort and Limoges.

== Career abroad ==
Upon returning to North Africa in the mid-1950s, Rebih briefly joined MC Alger before continuing his career in Tunisia with CS Hammam-Lif. Krimo notably scored the winning goal in a match against the Brazilian side São Cristóvão de Futebol e Regatas. After the fall of the Bey of Tunis, Krimo played for the US Tunisienne, helping the club gain promotion. During this period, Krimo also participated in sporting initiatives linked to the Algerian independence movement, including the World Festival of Youth and Students in Warsaw, where Algerian athletes marched under the Algerian flag.

== The ALN team ==
In 1957, Rebih was part of a selection of Algerian players based in Tunisia who competed in a North African tournament under the auspices of the National Liberation Army (ALN). The team later toured the Middle East to promote the Algerian cause internationally.

== Return to USM Alger ==
After Algeria gained independence in 1962, Rebih returned to USM Alger. He contributed to the club’s early successes in national competitions and remained with the team until the end of his career in 1970 at the age of 38.

== Playing style and personality ==
Rebih was known as a technical and creative player with a strong sense of teamwork. Former teammates often described his style as both imaginative and elegant. During his time at Club Sportif de Hammam Lif, he earned the nickname "Prince of Hammam Lif." In later years, Rebih expressed a critical view of modern football, arguing that the sport had become overly commercialized. He advocated for greater investment in youth development, training centers, and the education of young players.

== His death ==
Abdelkrim Ben Rebih, known as Krimo, died on 6 October 2012 after suffering from a serious illness for several months. His passing came only a few days after the death of another prominent Algerian centre-forward, Abdelkader Fréha. He was buried after the Asr prayer at the El Kettar Cemetery in Algiers.

== Career statistics ==
Appearances and goals by club, season and competition
Club	Season	League			Cup		Total	
Club	Season	Division	Apps	Goals	Apps	Goals	Apps	Goals
USM Alger	1962–63	Critériums d'Honneur						
USM Alger	1963–64	Division d'Honneur						
USM Alger	1964–65	National						
USM Alger	1965–66	Division d'Honneur	11	11	2	0	13	11
USM Alger	1966–67	Nationale II						
USM Alger	1967–68	Nationale II						
USM Alger	1968–69	Nationale II						
USM Alger	1969–70	National						
USM Alger	Total		0	0	0	0	0	0
Career total			0	0	0	0	0	0

== Honours ==
CS Hammam-Lif

- Ligue de Tunisie: 1954-55

USM Alger

- Championnat National: 1962-63
