= Abdelkader Chabou Stadium =

Stadium in Annaba, Algeria

Coordinates: 36.9042°N 7.7519°E

Colonel Abdelkader Chabou Stadium
- Interactive map of Colonel Abdelkader Chabou Stadium
- Location: Rue Layachi Salah, Annaba, Algeria
- Owner: OPOW Annaba
- Capacity: 10,000
- Surface: Grass

Tenant
- Hamra Annaba

Colonel Abdelkader Chabou Stadium (Arabic: ملعب العقيد عبد القادر شابو) is a multi-use stadium in Annaba, Algeria. It is currently used mostly for football matches and also sometimes for track cycling. It is the home ground of Hamra Annaba. The stadium holds 10,000 spectators.

In 2025, the African School Games final football game was held at the Stadium.
