= Abderrahmane Boubekeur =

Algerian footballer (1932–1999)

Abderrahmane Boubekeur (9 March 1932 – 20 July 1999) was an Algerian footballer who played as a goalkeeper. He played in seven matches for the Algeria national team.
