= Hamid Bernaoui =

Algerian footballer (1937–2020)

Personal information
- Full name: Hamid Bernaoui
- Date of birth: 3 December 1937
- Place of birth: Algiers, Algeria
- Date of death: 6 May 2020 (aged 82)
- Place of death: Algiers, Algeria
- Position: Forward

Youth career
- 1951–1956: USM Alger

Senior career*
Years	Team	Apps	(Gls)
1962–1970	USM Alger		

Managerial career
- 1992–1993: USM Alger
- * Club domestic league appearances and goals

Hamid Bernaoui (3 December 1937 – 6 May 2020) was a professional Algerian footballer who played as a forward.

== Career statistics ==
=== Club ===
Club	Season	League			Cup		Total	
Club	Season	Division	Apps	Goals	Apps	Goals	Apps	Goals
USM Alger	1962–63	Critériums d'Honneur	—	—	—	—	—	—
USM Alger	1963–64	Division d'Honneur	—	—	—	—	—	—
USM Alger	1964–65	National	—	—	—	—	—	—
USM Alger	1965–66	Division d'Honneur	18	2	3	1	21	3
USM Alger	1966–67	Nationale II	—	—	—	—	—	—
USM Alger	1967–68	Nationale II	—	—	—	—	—	—
USM Alger	1968–69	Nationale II	—	—	—	—	—	—
USM Alger	1969–70	Nationale I	—	—	—	—	—	—
USM Alger	Total		—	—	—	—	—	—
Career total			0	0	0	0	0	0

== Honours ==
  - Championnat National
    - Winner: 1962-63
