= SCM Oran =

Algerian football club

- Full name: Sporting Club Médiouni d'Oran
- Nickname: Hammama
- Founded: May 10, 1945; 81 years ago
- Ground: Habib Bouakeul Stadium; Oran, Algeria
- Capacity: 20,000
- League: Inter-Régions Division
- 2024–25: Inter-Régions Division, Group West, 12th
Home colours	Away colours

Sporting Club Médiouni d'Oran (Arabic: النادي الرياضي لمديوني وهران), known as SCM Oran or SCMO for short is an Algerian soccer club based in the Médiouni quarter of the city of Oran. The club was founded in 1945 and its colours are black and green. Their home stadium, Habib Bouakeul Stadium, has a capacity of 20,000 spectators. The club is currently playing in the Inter-Régions Division.

== History ==
The club was founded on 10 May 1945 in the popular neighbourhood Médioni in Oran. Between 1977 and 1987 the club was renamed Chabab Médioni Halib d'Oran (CMH Oran).

== Crest ==
Former logo

Present logo

== Achievements ==
- Honour Division Championship of West League of Oran (2 times)
  - Champion (2): 1963, 1965
- Algerian Championship
  - Third place (2): 1963, 1966

== Stadium ==
The team plays in the Habib Bouakeul Stadium which holds 20,000 people.
