= Djamel El Okbi =

Algerian footballer (1939–1994)

Djamel-Eddine El Okbi
Personal information
- Full name: Djamel El Okbi
- Date of birth: 15 October 1939
- Place of birth: Kouba, Algeria
- Date of death: 15 December 1994 (aged 55)
- Place of death: Algiers, Algeria
- Height: 1.80 m (5 ft 11 in)
- Position: Goalkeeper

Senior career*
| Years | Team | Apps | (Gls) |
| 1957–1960 | AS Saint-Eugènoise | | |
| 1962–1969 | USM Alger | | |
- * Club domestic league appearances and goals

Djamel El Okbi (15 October 1939 – 15 December 1994) was a professional Algerian footballer who played as a goalkeeper for USM Alger.

== Honours ==
  - Championnat National
    - Winner: 1962-63

== Clubs ==
- AS Saint-Eugènoise (1957–1960)
- USM Alger (1962–1969)
