= Boubekeur Belbekri =

Algerian footballer (born 1942)

Personal information
- Date of birth: 7 January 1942
- Place of birth: Algiers, Algeria
- Position: Defender

Senior career*
| Years | Team | Apps | (Gls) |
| 1962–1973 | USM Alger | | |

International career
| 1963–1968 | Algeria | 4 | (0) |
- * Club domestic league appearances and goals

Boubekeur Belbekri (born 7 January 1942) was a professional Algerian footballer who played as a defender.

== Life and career ==
Belbekri played his whole career with the USM Alger for 11 years, during which he won a single title in 1963 and five consecutive times to the final of the Algerian Cup and although there is no official number but he is one of the most players played games with the USM Alger more of 350 matches.

=== International ===
Belbekri played only four games with the national team first against Bulgaria in the first official game in the history of Algeria and participated as a substitute.

== Honours ==
=== Club ===
USM Alger

- Championnat National (1): 1962-63
- Algerian Cup Runner-up (5): 1968-69, 1969-70, 1970-71, 1971-72, 1972-73
