= Abdelaziz Ben Tifour =

French-Algerian footballer (1927-1970)

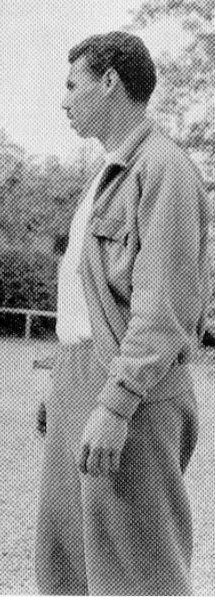

Personal information
- Date of birth: 25 July 1927
- Place of birth: Hussein Dey, French Algeria
- Date of death: 19 November 1970 (aged 43)
- Place of death: Algiers, Algeria
- Height: 1.74 m (5 ft 9 in)
- Position: Midfielder

Senior career*
Years	Team	Apps	(Gls)
1945–1946	Espérance Tunis	–	(–)
1946–1948	CS Hammam-Lif	–	(–)
1948–1953	Nice	129	(34)
1953–1955	AS Troyes-Savinienne	65	(15)
1955–1958	Monaco	86	(13)
1962–1963	USM Alger	–	(–)

International career
1952–1957	France	4	(0)
1958–1962	FLN	-	(-)

Managerial career
- 1959–1962: FLN
- 1961–1962: US Tunis
- 1969: Algeria
- 1969–1970: JS Kabylie
- * Club domestic league appearances and goals

Abdelaziz Ben Tifour (Arabic: عبدالعزيز بن طيفور; 25 July 1927 – 19 November 1970) was a professional footballer who played as a midfielder. Born in French Algeria, he was a France international before playing for the FLN football team.

== Life and career ==
He was a pioneer of Algerian football playing in Tunisia and France in the 40s and 50s as well as establishing the first Algerian national team with two other FLN activists featuring ten players in France's provisional World Cup squad on the eve of the finals in Sweden. One of those players was Ben Tifour, who had played for the France national team on four occasions including one appearance at the 1954 World Cup.

Born in Hussein-Dey In the summer of 1948, he moved to Europe to play for French first division club OGC Nice, making his debut in a 1–1 draw with Red Star Paris and by the time Ben Tifour played at the 1954 FIFA World Cup in Switzerland in a 3–2 win over Mexico; he had already won two league titles and a French Cup with OGC Nice. He moved to AS Troyes-Savinienne after six seasons with Nice in 1954 and then signed for AS Monaco in 1956, which would be his last club in Europe. In total, he made 280 appearances in the French top division, scoring 62 goals. He returned to Tunis in 1958 to form the FLN Algerian national team.

When Algeria was granted independence in 1962, the 33-year-old Ben Tifour unlike Mekloufi and Ahmed Oudjani who moved back to play in Europe, returned to his homeland to take up a player-coach role at USM Alger leading them to the first Algerian championship in 1963.

== Death ==
Ben Tifour died at the age of 43 while he was coach at JS Kabylie during the 1970–1971 season.

== Clubs ==
- Espérance Sportive de Tunis (1945–1946)
- Club Sportif de Hammam Lif (1946–1948)
- OGC Nice (1948–1954)
- AS Troyes-Savinienne (1954–1956)
- AS Monaco (1956–1958)
- FLN Equipe (1958–1962)
- USMA, Union Sportive de la Medina d'Alger (1962–1963)
