= HAMRA Annaba =

Algerian football club

- Full name: Hilal Amel Mostakbel Riadhi Annaba
- Nickname: Hamra
- Founded: 1944 (as Union Sportive Musulmane de Bône)
- Ground: Abdelkader Chabou Stadium
- Capacity: 10,000
- League: Ligue Régional I
- 2023–24: Inter-Régions Division, Group East, 15th (relegated)
Home colours	Away colours

Hilal Amel Moustakbel Riadhi Annaba (Arabic: هلال أمل المستقبل الرياضي عنابة), or simply HAMR Annaba, commonly called HAMRA Annaba (Arabic: حمراء عنابة) is an Algerian football club based in Annaba. The club was founded on 1944 and its colours are red and white. Their home stadium, Abdelkader Chabou Stadium, has a capacity of 10,000 spectators. The club is currently playing in the Ligue Régional I.

== History ==
From 1944 to the independence of Algeria, the club played under the name of Union Sportive Musulmane de Bône (USM Bône). From 1964 to 1971 the team changed the name to Union Sportive Musulmane d'Annaba (USM Annaba), not to be confused with the current USM Annaba (Union Sportive Médinat d'Annaba) (a new team created in 1983), the club won its first Algerian Championnat National.

In 1972, Hamra Annaba won its first Algerian Cup in the club's history by beating USM Alger 2–0 in the final.

The club came eighth in the 2009–10 Ligue Inter-Régions de football – Groupe Est. The club was promoted for the 2010–11 season of the newly created Championnat National de Football Amateur due to the professionalisation of the first two divisions in Algeria.

== Crest ==
Old logo

Former logo

Present logo

== Honours ==
- Algerian Championnat National: 1

Winner: 1964

- Algerian Cup: 1

Winner: 1972
