= Abderrahmane Meziani =

Algerian footballer (1942-2016)

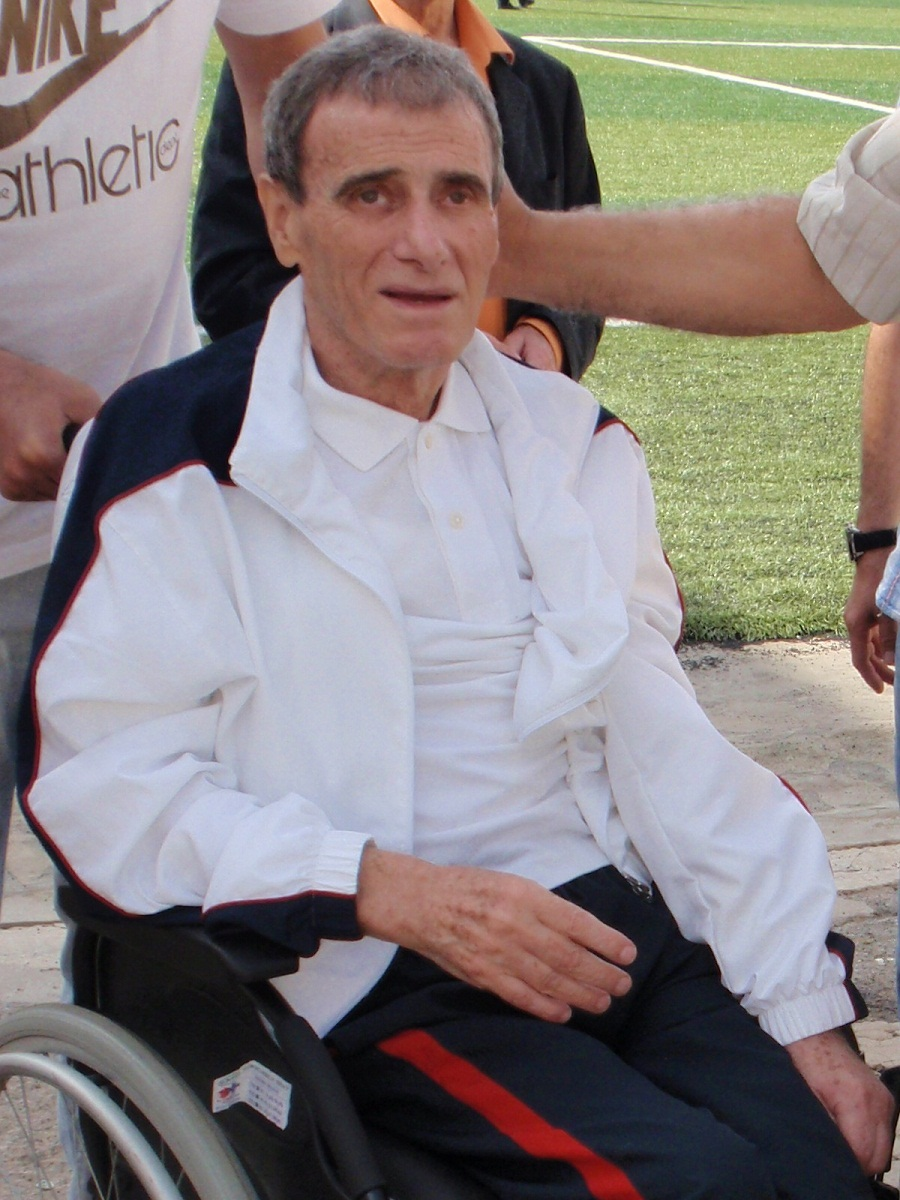

Personal information
- Full name: Mezmez
- Date of birth: 12 May 1942
- Place of birth: Algiers, Algeria
- Date of death: 2 June 2016 (aged 74)
- Place of death: Algiers, Algeria
- Position: Forward

Senior career*
Years	Team	Apps	(Gls)
1960–1962	AS Saint-Eugènoise	–	(–)
1962–1976	USM Alger	–	(–)

International career
1963	Algeria	3	(1)
- * Club domestic league appearances and goals

Abderrahmane Meziani (12 May 1942 – 2 June 2016) was a professional Algerian footballer who played as a forward.

== Life and career ==
Born in Algiers on 12 May 1942, Abderrahmane Meziani began his career at MC Alger in 1955 in the minimal category, he then passed through ASPTT Algiers before landing at the AS Saint-Eugène, Algiers flagship club during the colonial era. After the independence of Algeria in 1962, then aged 20, Meziani signed to USM Alger to spend the rest of his career there.

On 6 January 1963, he was selected for the first time in Team Algeria for a friendly match against the Bulgaria. He scored a goal in the 80th minute and allowed his team to emerge victorious from his first official meeting.

On 1 May 2006 Meziani suffered a cardiovascular event. The left side of his body was paralyzed. After several days in a coma, he was transferred to France in order to receive the necessary care. He recovered slowly after a long rehabilitation. However, it became necessary to always use a wheelchair.

Abderrahmane Meziani died on Thursday 2 June 2016 at 8 am in Algiers after a long fight against illness.

== Honours ==
  - Championnat National
    - Winner: 1962-63
  - Algerian Cup
    - Runners–up: 1968-69, 1969-70, 1970-71, 1971-72, 1972-73

=== International goals ===
==== National team ====
Scores and results list Algeria's goal tally first. "Score" column indicates the score after the player's goal.

#	Date	Venue	Opponent	Score	Result	Competition
1.	6 January 1963	Stade d'El Anasser, Algiers	Bulgaria	2–1	2–1	Friendly
