= History of USM Alger (1962–2010) =

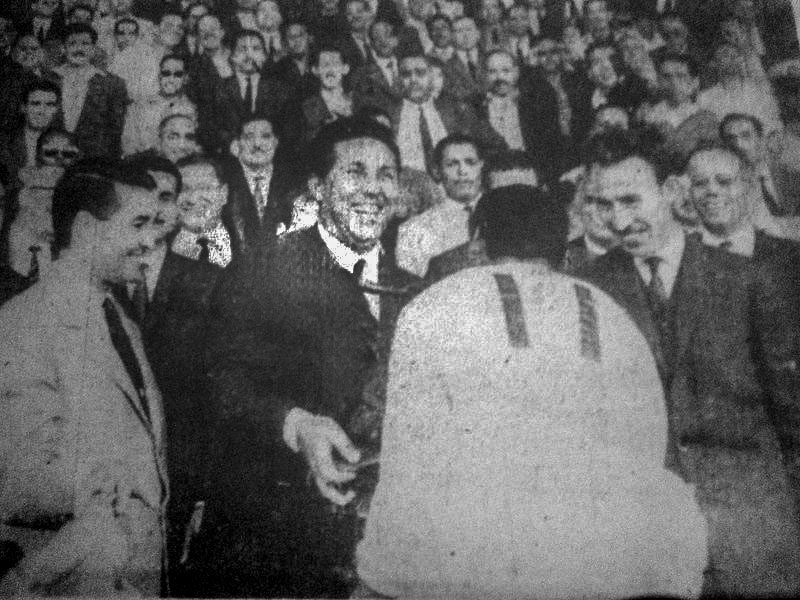
Abdelaziz Ben Tifour, coach of USM Alger receives from the hands of Ahmed Ben Bella president, the first trophy Algerian football championship, under the gaze of president of FAF, Dr Maouche (left) and Minister of Defense Houari Boumedienne (right).

The history of Union Sportive Médina d'Alger between 1962 and 2010, commonly referred to as USM Alger or simply USMA, is an Algerian professional association football club based in Algiers, whose first team play in the highest tier of Algerian football, the Ligue 1. Established on 5 July 1937. The club won its first major trophy in 1963, defeating MC Alger in the Critérium d'Honneur final. USMA has reached the cup final 17 times a national record, including an impressive run of five consecutive appearances from 1969 to 1973.

They have won the cup eight times, with the first win coming in 1981 against ASM Oran, and the most recent in 2013, once again defeating MC Alger. In terms of the Algerian Super Cup, USMA has lifted the trophy twice. USM Alger has also experienced relegation in its history. The first drop to the second division occurred from 1965 to 1969, with the longest spell in the lower tier lasting from 1990 to 1995.

== After independence ==
=== Algeria's First Champion ===
Following Algeria's independence in 1962, national football competitions were reorganized under the guidance of the Ministry of Sports and Youth. Due to the geographical spread of clubs based on the former French colonial departments each regional league operated autonomously. Competitions were structured as regional championships, with departmental champions qualifying for national playoffs to determine the Algerian champion.

In the inaugural 1962–63 season, USM Alger made history by becoming the first champions of independent Algeria. The club appointed Abdelaziz Ben Tifour, a former player for Nice and Monaco, as both coach and player. The squad notably included Freddy Zemmour, a Pied-Noir and one of the few French players who chose to remain in Algeria after independence.

USM Alger competed in Group V, finishing top with 51 points and registering the strongest attack across all groups with 75 goals. In the Algiers League, they were grouped with MC Alger, AS Orléansville, NA Hussein Dey and OM Saint Eugène, and again finished first with a perfect record of 12 points from 12. In the semi-final, they defeated Hamra Annaba (then known as USM Annaba) to reach the national final.

In the championship final, USM Alger once again faced MC Alger. The "Red and Black," led by player-coach Ben Tifour, triumphed 3–0 in a match played at the Stade d'El Annasser, in the presence of President Ahmed Ben Bella and Minister of Defense Houari Boumedienne. With this victory, USM Alger became the first club to win the Algerian football championship in the post independence era.

=== Early Domestic Campaigns (1963–1969) ===
In the 1962–63 Algerian Cup, USM Alger reached the semi-finals but were eliminated by ES Sétif. During the 1963–64 season, USMA finished third in the Algiers group, one point behind NA Hussein Dey, who won the group. In the cup, the team again reached the semi-finals but was defeated by ES Sétif. The 1964–65 season saw USMA relegated to the second division after finishing in last place. They were eliminated in the second round of the Algerian Cup by NA Hussein Dey. In the 1965–66 Division Honneur, USM Alger finished second behind MC Alger, and both clubs were promoted to the newly formed Nationale II.

In the 1966–67 Nationale II, USMA finished fifth, failing to secure promotion to the top flight. Abderrahmane Meziani was the club's top scorer with 8 goals. In the Algerian Cup, the team once again fell to ES Sétif in the semi-finals, marking the third such elimination by the same opponent. During the 1967–68 season, USMA once again missed out on promotion, finishing fifth, four points behind JS Djijel, who were promoted. Meziani was again the club's top scorer. In the 1968–69 season, USM Alger finally earned promotion to Nationale I, finishing second behind JS Kabylie. That same season, the club reached its first Algerian Cup final, but was defeated by CR Belcourt, 3–5 in a replay match after a draw in the initial final.

=== Five Finals, No Glory: USM Alger's Heartbreaking Era ===
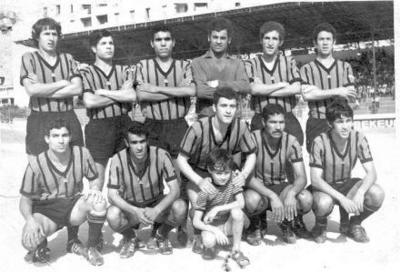
USM Alger 1969–70 with From Left to Right: Stand Up : Abdouche - Berahma - Saadi - Zebairi - Debbah - Belbekri. Sitting Tchalabi - Allik - Meziani - Zitoune - Aissaoui.

In the late 1960s and early 1970s, USM Alger became a dominant force in Algerian football, reaching the Algerian Cup final seven times, including a remarkable streak of five consecutive finals from 1969 to 1973. Prior to that, the team had been eliminated three times in the semi-finals, all by the same opponent ES Sétif.

1969 Final – vs CR Belcourt

USM Alger reached their first ever Algerian Cup final in 1969, after tightly contested victories in the quarter-finals and semi-finals against RC Kouba and NA Hussein Dey, respectively both wins secured by a single goal. In the final, they faced CR Belcourt, the reigning Algerian champions. The match ended in a 5–3 defeat for USMA after a replay. The final is notable for featuring the first hat-trick in an Algerian Cup final, scored by Hacène Lalmas. Despite the loss, USM Alger qualified as cup runners-up for the Maghreb Cup Winners Cup held in Morocco, reaching the final before losing to RS Settat, the Coupe du Trône champions.

1970 Final – vs CR Belcourt

USM Alger returned to the final the following year, once again facing CR Belcourt. The first match ended in a draw and required a replay, in which USMA suffered a heavy 4–1 defeat. Still, USMA participated once more in the Maghreb Cup Winners Cup as Algerian Cup runners-up but finished last, losing to Club Africain and Wydad Casablanca.

1971 Final – vs MC Alger

In 1971, USM Alger reached the final after a grueling campaign that included home-and-away quarter-finals and semi-finals. In the semis, they faced USM Khenchela in a highly charged match. Tensions arose due to a misinterpreted chant by USMA fans, labeling Khenchela as "Shawiya", which was seen as derogatory. The match was disrupted multiple times by crowd invasions and lasted four hours. USMA players had to remain in the dressing room until midnight under the protection of a Gendarmerie brigade from Batna, finally returning to Algiers at 9 AM the next day. Both clubs were later sanctioned by the Algerian Football Federation and forced to play their matches at least 50 kilometers away from their home stadiums for a year. As a result, USM Alger hosted their 1971–72 home matches at Stade des Frères Brakni in Blida..

USM Alger reached its third consecutive Algerian Cup final, facing MC Alger in the first Algiers Derby final between the two rivals. Despite fielding an experienced team, USMA fell behind early through Omar Betrouni before Zoubir Bachi added a second goal before halftime. Although USMA controlled much of the second half and created several chances, they were unable to score, losing 2–0 and suffering a third straight defeat in the competition's final.

1972 Final – vs Hamra Annaba

The 1972 cup run was also difficult, with three of four matches won by a single goal margin. The final took place at the newly inaugurated Stade du 5 Juillet, opened by President Houari Boumédiène. USM Alger faced USM Annaba and suffered their fourth straight final defeat. Interestingly, prior to the senior final, the youth team of USMA beat RC Kouba in the youth final, with Nacer Guedioura scoring the first-ever goal at the new stadium. Notably, USMA was deprived of Kamel Tchalabi, who had played in a military competition final. Despite promises that he could participate if he only played one half and scored, he was ultimately barred from playing in the Cup final.

1973 Final – vs MC Alger

In their fifth consecutive final, USM Alger once again faced MC Alger, but were defeated for the fifth time in a row. This era, despite the lack of trophies, remains one of the most consistent and competitive periods in the club's history, underscoring their importance in Algerian football during that time.

== First professional era (1977–1989) ==
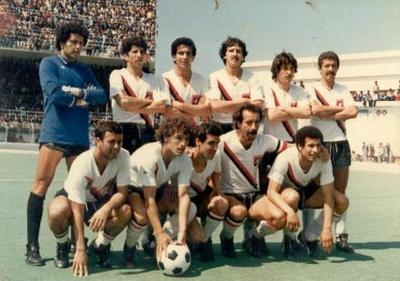
USM Alger 1979–80 with From Left to Right: Stand Up : Bouaichaoui - Soumatia - Amenouche - Abdouche - Bourad - Rabet. Sitting Derouaz - Slimani - Bahbouh - Keddou - Guedioura.

=== USM Alger in the Era of Reforms and the First Cup Triumph ===
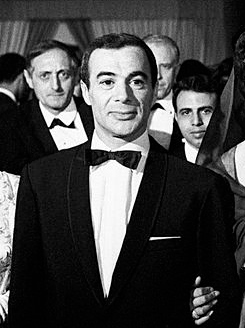
Saadi Yacef club president from, 1972 to 1975 was one of the leaders of Algeria's National Liberation Front during his country's war of independence.

During this period, the club experienced a decline in performance in Division 1. The best league result was a fourth-place finish in the 1975–76 season. However, this season also witnessed the biggest victory in Algerian League history, when USM Alger defeated ASM Oran 11–0 at Stade du 5 Juillet, with Djamel Zidane scoring five goals. The 1970s were marked by instability at the managerial level, with multiple changes involving coaches such as Ahmed Zitoun, Abdelghani Zitouni, Hamid Belamine, and Ahmed Arab each managing the team over two different periods. The club, then known as USK Alger, was relegated to the second division from 1972 to 1974.

Toward the end of 1974, a major sports reform initiated by the Ministry of Youth and Sports sought to provide elite clubs with a solid financial foundation, promoting a professional structure under the system known as Association Sportive de Performances (ASP). As part of this reform, many clubs changed their names based on their state sponsors. For instance, Sonatrach sponsored clubs included MP Alger (MC Alger), MP Oran (MC Oran), and EP Sétif (ES Sétif). In line with this reform, during the 1977–78 season, USK Alger was renamed Union sportive kahraba d'Alger (Arabic: كهرباء, kahraba) meaning electricity, under the sponsorship of Sonelgaz (Société nationale de l'électricité et du gaz).

After suffering seven defeats in Algerian Cup finals, El Kahraba finally won their first Cup title in the 1980–81 season, defeating ASM Oran coached by Ali Benfadah at the newly built Stade 24 Fevrier 1956. This victory made them the first club to win the Algerian Cup while playing in the second division. Some officials and supporters of USM Alger believe that the team's previous final losses were politically influenced, blaming President Houari Boumédiène for his antagonism toward former President Ahmed Ben Bella a well known supporter of USM Alger. They note that the Cup victory came only after Boumédiène's death.

Following promotion back to the top flight, USM Alger played in the inaugural Super Cup at Stade du 20 Août 1955, losing to reigning champions RC Kouba. They finished the league season in ninth place. That same season, they made their debut in a continental competition the African Cup Winners Cup and reached the quarter-finals before being eliminated by Hearts of Oak. In 1987, the club changed its name again to Union d'Alger, but this was short lived. Amidst a financial and economic crisis, the Algerian government abandoned the 1977 reform in 1989, and most clubs reverted to their historical identities. USM Alger thus adopted its final and current name Union sportive de la médina d'Alger (Arabic: مدينة, romanized: médina) meaning city.

=== Victory and Vulnerability: The Cup Win and the Crisis That Followed ===
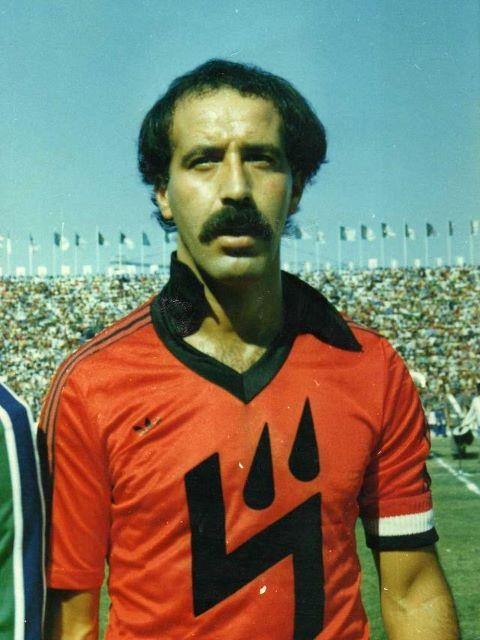
Djamel Keddou, was an USM Alger player and manager, he led USM Alger to the Algerian Cup in 1981 and 1988.

On July 5, 1987, USK Alger celebrated its 50th anniversary. However, the event failed to live up to its potential as an inclusive celebration of the club's rich history. Many influential figures, from founding members like Sid Ahmed Kemmat to notable supporters like Chaabi singer Boualem Rahma, were absent. The lack of recognition for many individuals who had contributed to the club over the years left the celebration incomplete.

Despite a turbulent period, USM Alger managed to return to the first division in the 1987–88 season with a young squad, mainly composed of players from the reserve team. Under the leadership of Djamel Keddou, who was also a former captain, the team overcame their inexperience and achieved a historic victory in the Algerian Cup. They defeated CR Belcourt in a penalty shootout at Stade 5 Juillet 1962. This was the fourth final between the two clubs, and the first time USMA emerged victorious after three previous defeats.

Following the match, controversy erupted around Amar Kabrane, who was heavily criticized and accused of intentionally missing his penalty especially since he later transferred to USM Alger. With the cup win, USM Alger secured qualification for the African Cup Winners Cup for the second time. They reached the quarter-finals but chose to withdraw from the competition after a home loss to Madagascar's Football Club Banky, citing financial difficulties.

In the 1989–90 season, USM Alger suffered a major setback, finishing last in the league with the weakest defense, and were relegated to the second division. Following relegation, the club aimed for an immediate return to the top flight but failed to achieve promotion. In the Algerian Cup, they were eliminated in the quarter-finals by USM Bel Abbès. At the end of the season, the club's top scorer, Tarek Hadj Adlane, left to join JS Kabylie.

This period was marked by significant instability, particularly at the administrative level. The presidency of the Board of Directors changed hands three times, with Saïd Hammo, Rachid Khelouati, and Mouldi Aïssaoui (who was also president of the Algerian Football Federation) all taking the role. Meanwhile, Algeria faced a deepening political and economic crisis, and the onset of the "black decade" had a profound impact on the club's future.

Coaching instability also plagued the team, with several changes in a short span. One of the coaches during this turbulent era was the Soviet manager Acramov. The 1992–93 season was particularly chaotic, with four coaches, including Saïd Allik and Mouldi Aïssaoui, managing the team during the same campaign an unprecedented situation in the club's history. In the 1993–94 season, USMA came close to returning to the first division but narrowly missed out. Despite a strong campaign, they lost out to ASO Chlef on head-to-head results in the final round, once again failing to secure promotion.

== Saïd Allik Era (1994–2010) ==
=== The Allik Era Begins: USM Alger's Return to Glory ===
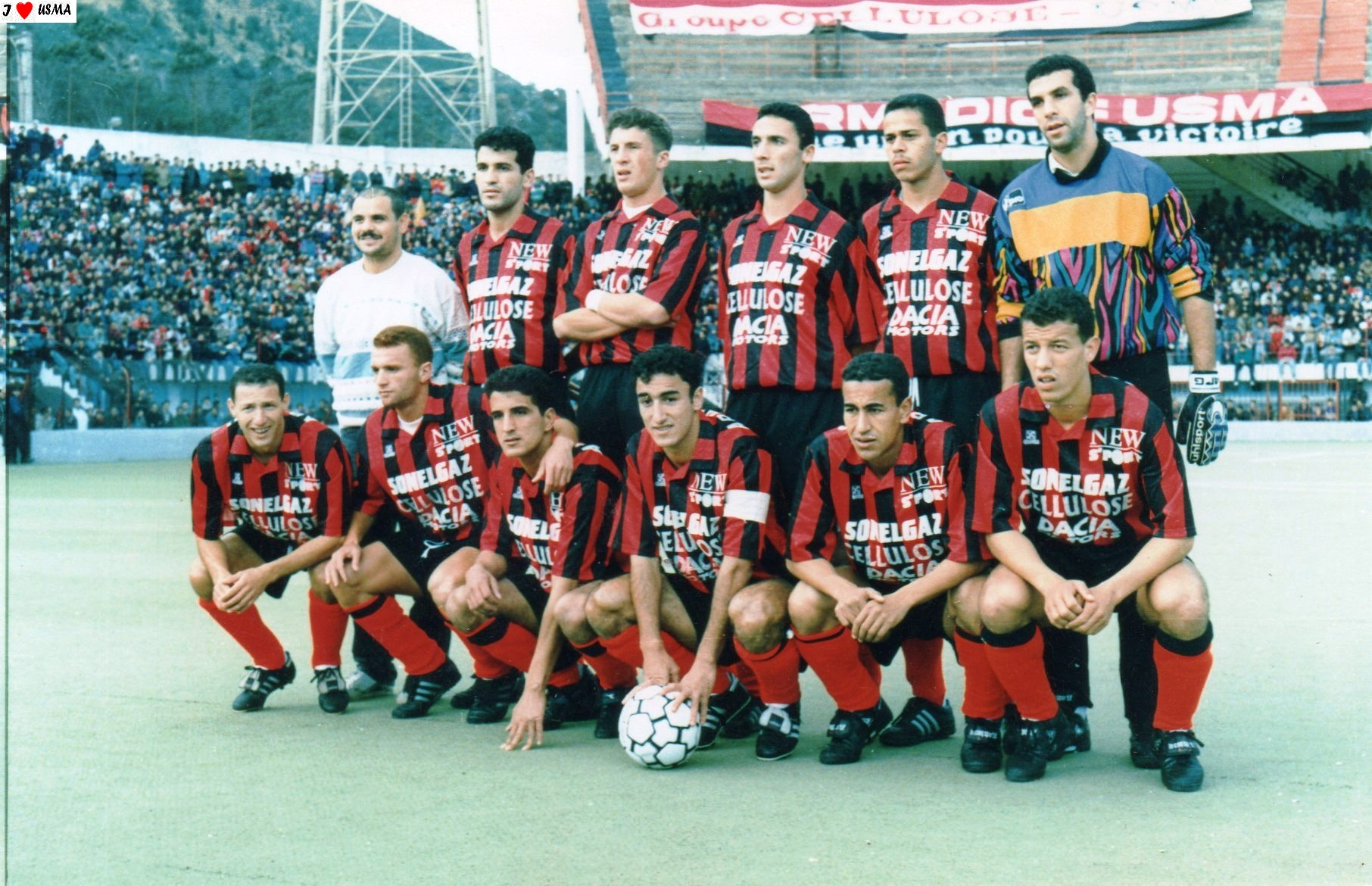
USM Alger Team Winning the league title season 1995–96 with From Left to Right: Stand Up : Abdelmalek Khouni - Abdelmalek Brakni - Rachid Boumrar - Fouad Smati - Laïd Belgherbi. Sitting Billel Dziri - Nacer Zekri - Farouk Bouhamidi - Azzedine Rahim (c) - Samir Sloukia - Mohamed Hamdoud.

In 1994, Saïd Allik became Chairman of the Board of Directors of USM Alger, promising to return the club to Division 1. On May 26, 1995, USM Alger secured promotion with an away win against MC Ouargla, ending five full seasons in the second tier. Under the leadership of Younes Ifticène, the team completed its return to the top flight. Allik declared that USM Alger was back in its rightful place and vowed that the club would not fall to the second division again.

In the 1995–96 season, despite achieving the goal of promotion, Ifticène left the club and was replaced by Nour Benzekri, who resigned mid-season following a disagreement with Azzedine Rahim. Rahim suffered a serious injury after a violent tackle from Tarek Lazizi. Due to the severity of the injury, Rahim was sent to Salt Lake City, United States, for treatment, but he continued to suffer and eventually ended his career prematurely.

On 8 February 1996, the Algiers Derby at Omar Hamadi Stadium in Bologhine was abandoned following a serious crowd-related incident. The match had been played in front of a packed stadium during the month of Ramadan, and USM Alger took the lead in the 13th minute through Nacer Zekri. Shortly after the goal, a flare thrown from the stands struck assistant referee Benhamouda on the head, causing an injury and bleeding.

Given the severity of the incident and the tense atmosphere inside the stadium, referee Belbordj decided to stop the match, which was subsequently abandoned. The episode remains one of the most notable incidents in the history of the Algiers Derby. USM Alger went on to have a fierce title race with MC Oran. In the final round, they clinched the championship with a win over CS Constantine at Stade Mohamed Hamlaoui, finishing just two points ahead. It was their first league title in 33 years, and the second in club history.

The following season, Tarek Hadj Adlane returned to the club after five years, and USMA signed Mahieddine Meftah, an African champion. This sparked a long-standing rivalry between Allik and Mohand Chérif Hannachi. USM Alger, however, failed to retain their title. In a dramatic reversal of the previous season, CS Constantine needed a win in the final match to secure the championship and they did. This outcome prompted Tahar Chérif El-Ouazzani to claim, 24 years later, that USMA had cost them two league titles. In 1997, USM Alger participated in the revamped CAF Champions League for the first time and reached the group stage. Despite defeating Primeiro de Agosto in the final match, they failed to qualify for the final, as Raja Casablanca scored a last-minute winner in South Africa to advance instead.

During the 1997–98 season, the Algerian Football Federation restructured the league into groups. USMA were placed in Group B alongside tough competitors like ES Sétif, JS Kabylie, and MC Alger. They qualified for the final, finishing three points ahead of JS Kabylie. In the final against USM El Harrach at Stade du 5 Juillet 1962, USMA led 2–0 with just 20 minutes left but conceded three goals and lost 3–2. Coach Ifticène was criticized for substituting the two goal scorers. In 1998, Bologhine Stadium was renamed Omar Hamadi Stadium, in honor of the club's former leader and revolutionary, Omar Hamadi, who was executed by a terrorist group in 1995, along with his two sons.

In the 1999 CAF Cup, USM Alger reached the quarter-finals, where they were eliminated by Wydad Casablanca. The 1999–2000 National 1 was one of the worst for the club since promotion, as they finished in last place. Coach Rabah Saâdane was dismissed after failing to meet expectations in all competitions. Fortunately, there was no relegation that season. Allik described it as a chance to rebuild and dominate Algerian football, signing major players such as Hichem Mezaïr, Moncef Ouichaoui, and Issaad Bourahli, while also promoting youth talent. However, in the 2000 African Cup Winners' Cup, USM Alger was disqualified and banned from African competition for one year due to the fielding of ineligible goalkeeper Siaka Coulibaly against JS du Ténéré. In the 2002 African Cup Winners' Cup, the club made a strong run to the semi-finals, only to be eliminated once again by Wydad Casablanca, denying them a shot at their first continental title.

=== Division 1 Runners-up and Algerian Cup Record ===
Algerian Cup record, 1996–2007

Year	Round
1997	Champions
1998	Round of 16
1999	Champions
2000	Round of 16
2001	Champions
2002	Round of 32
2003	Champions
2004	Champions
2005	Round of 64
2006	Runners-up
2007	Runners-up

From 1996 to 2001, USM Alger endured a period of drought in the Algerian league, failing to win the title. The team only secured the runners-up position twice in 1998 and 2001 leaving them without major league honors during that period. However, the club excelled in the Algerian Cup, adding three more trophies during this otherwise difficult era, and five total from 1997 to 2003, solidifying their status as a cup powerhouse.

1997 – A Victory Marred by Tragedy

USMA's Cup run began controversially in the Round of 16 when CS Constantine failed to show up, allegedly accused of collusion to aid USMA's league chances. Despite the drama, USMA advanced and eventually defeated CA Batna in the final with a goal by Tarek Ghoul. The joy was overshadowed by tragedy: three USMA supporters were murdered in a fake military checkpoint in Frais Vallon during Eid al-Fitr, amid the height of Algeria's black decade.

1999 – Political Significance and Fierce Controversy

USM Alger won their fourth Algerian Cup against JS Kabylie at the Stade du 5 Juillet, with goals from Billel Dziri and Tarek Hadj Adlane, a former JSK player. The final was symbolically important, being attended by newly elected President Abdelaziz Bouteflika and USMA honorary president Saadi Yacef.

In the semi-finals against MC Alger, a major controversy erupted over the venue arrangement. Traditionally, the semi-finals were to be played over two legs, with each team hosting one match. However, due to the security situation during the black decade, the Ministry of Youth and Sports, led by Mohamed Aziz Derouaz, decided that both legs would be played at Stade du 5 Juillet the official home ground of MC Alger. Saïd Allik, the president of USM Alger, strongly objected, arguing that this setup favored MC Alger unfairly. Allik insisted either each team should host one leg at its own stadium or that a neutral venue should be selected. The Ministry refused, maintaining that Stade du 5 Juillet was the only viable option for security reasons.

On match day, the conflict reached its peak USM Alger arrived at their home ground, Omar Hamadi Stadium, while MC Alger and the referees went to Stade du 5 Juillet, rendering the match unplayable. This prompted intervention from the Minister of the Interior and Local Authorities, Abdelmalek Sellal, who called Allik to mediate a solution. Allik reiterated his two proposals: either each club plays one leg at its home stadium or a single match is held at a neutral venue suggesting Stade du 19 Mai 1956 in Annaba. Ultimately, due to the ongoing civil conflict and because both clubs were based in Algiers, the authorities decided to proceed with Stade du 5 Juillet as the venue for the match.

2001 – A Hard Fought Title

In the Semi-finals, USMA faced JSM Skikda, a match that was abandoned in the 46th minute after a pitch invasion. USMA were leading 1–0 thanks to Azzedine Rahim. Under political pressure, Allik agreed to replay the match. It was rescheduled at a neutral venue, Stade des Frères Brakni, where USMA won 3–0. In the final, USMA defeated CRB Mécheria a second-division team with a lone goal from Hocine Achiou. The game was nearly disrupted due to a power outage, which halted play for over 10 minutes in the first half.

=== 2002–03: The Greatest Season in USM Alger's History ===

USM Alger famous 2002/03 team

The 2002–03 is widely regarded as the greatest in the history of USM Alger, as the club participated in five different competitions. The campaign began with the Arab Unified Club Championship, where USMA was eliminated in the group stage. In the Cup Winners' Cup, the "Red and Black" reached the semi-finals but were knocked out by Wydad Casablanca. Despite playing the second leg in Algeria, they failed to secure the win needed to qualify for the final and claim their first continental title.

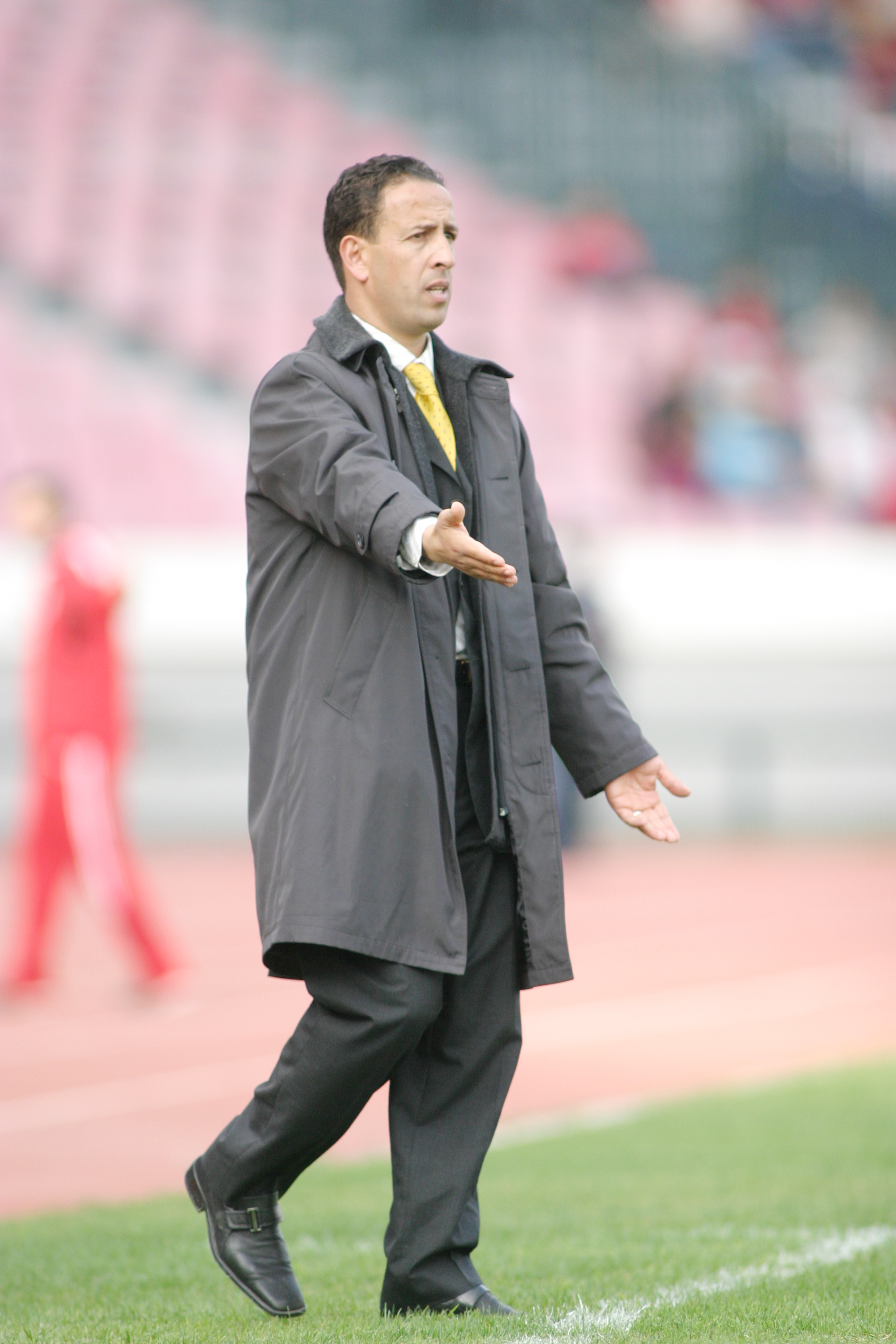
The Coach Azzedine Aït Djoudi Led USM Alger to Its Historic 2002–03 Double.

Domestically, the journey in Division 1 was intense, with fierce competition from USM Blida, NA Hussein Dey, and JS Kabylie. Officially crowned Algerian champions since May 21, 2003, the Red and Black crushed ASM Oran, a win that sealed the title for a team that dominated the league from start to finish. This triumph marks the fourth national title in the club's history and their second in a row, a back-to-back success that confirms USM Alger's supremacy on the domestic scene. Moncef Ouichaoui also finished as league top scorer with 18 goals, becoming the first USMA player to win the title.

Deeply moved at the end of the match, President Saïd Allik insisted on fully savoring this triumph before thinking about the future: "USMA has once again proven that it has gained maturity and stature. Today, it is a club that reigns supreme in Algeria." He broke down in front of the journalists, still deeply affected by the recent loss of his son, who died in a car accident. On February 24, 2003, in a derby match against CR Belouizdad, the game descended into chaos late on. Goalkeeper Hichem Mezaïr was attacked by a ball boy as he went to retrieve the ball, prompting a response and causing a violent altercation among players, officials, and supporters. Despite the unrest, the match was eventually completed.

USM Alger claimed a historic double by winning the Algerian Cup after a hard-fought 39th final under intense heat defeating CR Belouizdad. Despite early struggles, they showed resilience and turned the tide in extra time. Moncef Ouichaoui sealed the golden goal in the 115th minute. USMA once again proved they are the dominant force in Algerian football. At the end of 2003, Amar Ammour won the Ballon d'or, awarded by El Heddaf-Le Buteur, ahead of former teammate Isâad Bourahli and Brahim Hemdani. The ceremony was attended by key sports figures, including Minister of Youth and Sports Boudjemaâ Haïchour, Algerian Olympic Committee President Mustapha Berraf, and FAF President Mohamed Raouraoua.

=== 2003–05: Rise in Africa and End of a Glorious Era ===
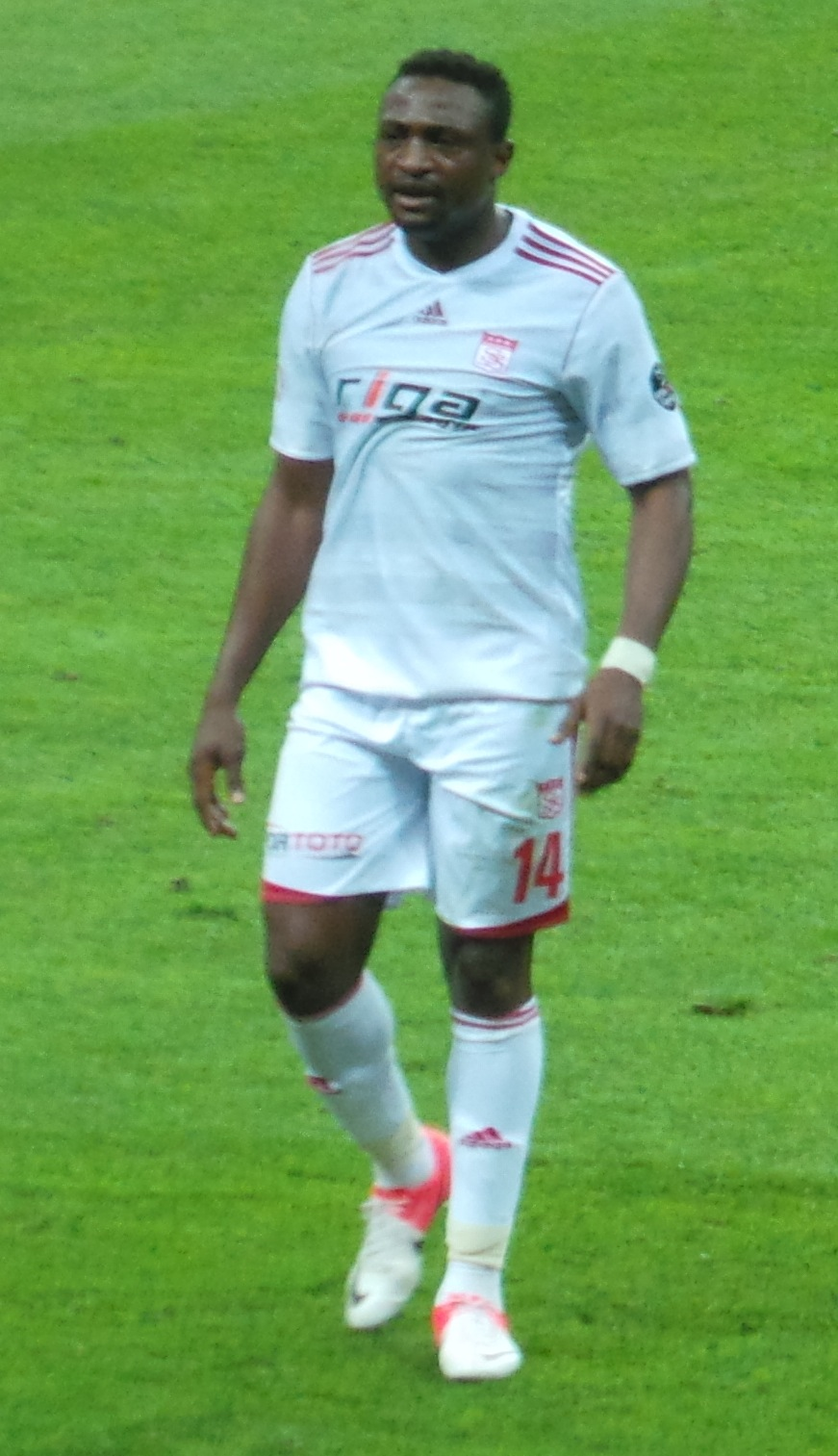
Nigerian striker Michael Eneramo is the youngest player to score a hat-trick in USM Alger's first team, at 19 years old.

USMA returned to the CAF Champions League in the following season after a six year absence and made a historic run to the semi-finals, where they were eliminated by Enyimba. In the next edition, Mamadou Diallo became the top scorer with 10 goals, a first for an Algerian club player, before transferring to FC Nantes for €700,000. In 2004, USM Alger won their seventh Algerian Cup, defeating JS Kabylie on penalties. However, by the 2004–05 season, a remarkable era was nearing its end. Under Mustapha Aksouh, the club claimed its fifth league title, the last under president Saïd Allik.

In the final round, although USMA had nothing to play for, they crushed OMR El Annasser 4–0, with all goals scored by Michael Eneramo, making him the youngest player, at 19 years old to score a hat-trick for the club. This emphatic performance was rooted in a memory from the 1993–94 season, when USMA missed out on promotion after accusing OMR El Annasser of easing the way for ASO Chlef. In 2005, Billel Dziri became the second USMA player to win the Ballon d'or. Dziri expressed immense joy upon receiving the award from World Cup winner Laurent Blanc, along with a message from Zinedine Zidane, saying the honor was the culmination of years of hard work at home and abroad.

=== 2005–2010: Decline and Turbulence ===
From 2005 to 2010, USM Alger went through its worst period under Saïd Allik. The team failed to win any titles and lost two Algerian Cup finals against fierce rivals MC Alger, their first such defeats since 1980. The club's performance in African competitions also declined, and USMA only participated in the Arab Champions League during this time. A key reason for the downturn was the aging of the squad, as most core players either retired or declined, and the club failed to rejuvenate the team. It is widely believed that Allik's political support for Ali Benflis against President Abdelaziz Bouteflika in the presidential elections also negatively impacted the club's fortunes.

In the 2005–06 season, USMA finished as runners-up, just one point behind JS Kabylie. A controversial moment occurred in their match in Tizi Ouzou, where USMA refused to play the second half after allegations that their players were assaulted, including Billel Dziri, who claimed to have been stabbed though it was later revealed to be Merbromin (an antiseptic), not blood.

The club cycled through several coaches, including foreigners René Lobello and Oscar Fulloné, but none achieved the desired results. By the end of the 2009–10 season, club captain Billel Dziri retired at 38 years and four months, after over two decades in football, most of which were spent at USMA. His final match was fittingly against his former club NA Hussein Dey. Dziri stated that while he could have played another season or two, it was the right time to step away.
