= 1975–76 USM Alger season =

USM Alger
1975–76 season
- President: Abdelaziz Tazairt
- Head coach: Ahmed Arab (until ?? 1975); Abdelghani Zitouni (from ?? 1975)
- Stadium: Stade du 5 Juillet
- National I: 4th
- Algerian Cup: Round of 32
- Highest home attendance: 35,677 vs. MC Alger (16 November 1975)
- Lowest home attendance: 768 vs. USM Bel Abbès (4 July 1976)
- Average home league attendance: 11.459

In the 1975–76 season, USM Alger competed in the Championnat National for the 14th season, as well as the Algerian Cup. They competed in Championnat National, and the Algerian Cup.

== Summary season ==
On matchday 4, USM Alger defeated MC Oran (4–2) on 5 October 1975 at the Stade du 20-Août-1955, in front of 7,090 spectators. Trailing after Belgot's opening goal, USMA turned the match around thanks to goals from Zidane, Guedioura (a brace), and Benmessaoud. The game was marked by the Algiers side's strong attacking efficiency. This victory confirmed USM Alger's promising start to the season.

Played as part of matchday 6 of the championship, this Algiers derby ended in a logical draw (1–1). CR Belcourt opened the scoring very early through Messahel in the 3rd minute, before USM Alger equalized in the 17th minute thanks to Zidane. Considered average from a technical standpoint, the match resembled more a game of application than a high-intensity confrontation, as noted by the press at the time.

On matchday 12, USM Alger crushed ASM Oran by a historic scoreline of 11–0 at the Stade du 5 Juillet. From the opening minutes, the Usmistes imposed total domination on a waterlogged pitch. Djamel Zidane, man of the match, scored five goals, delivering an exceptional individual performance. Benmessaoud and Déraoui each netted a brace, while Rabet and completed the scoring. This match remains one of the largest victories in the history of Algerian football and a major milestone for USMA.

In a match played at the Stade du 5 Juillet, RC Kouba defeated USM Alger (1–0) in front of 23,266 spectators. The contest, evenly balanced for long periods, was characterized by a strong tactical battle between the two sides. The turning point came in the 49th minute when Bedjaoui scored the only goal of the match with a precise header. After taking the lead, RCK managed their advantage well. USMA tried to respond by increasing their attacking efforts, but a lack of efficiency prevented the Algiers side from equalizing.

The match between USM Alger and NA Hussein Dey ended in a goalless draw (0–0) at the Stade du 5 Juillet, in front of approximately 27,135 spectators. The game featured alternating periods of dominance and numerous missed chances, highlighting a lack of attacking efficiency on both sides. Despite sustained commitment and solid tactical organization, particularly defensively, neither team managed to convert their strong phases. The result reignited debate over attacking sterility, attributed either to bad luck or to the forwards’ lack of precision.

In the 30th and final round of the 1975–76 Nationale I, USM Alger defeated USM Bel Abbès 8–2 in a match held in Algiers. After a relatively balanced first half, USM Alger took control in the second half, scoring most of their goals thanks to their physical and technical superiority. The press described the game as being closer to a “training session.” The goals for USM Alger were scored by Mustapha Amenouche (4 goals), Bachir Zitoune (3 goals), and Nacer Guedioura (1 goal), while Tabet Derraz and Benchinoun scored the two goals for USM Bel Abbès.

== Squad list ==
Players and squad numbers last updated on 1 September 1970.
Note: Flags indicate national team as has been defined under FIFA eligibility rules. Players may hold more than one non-FIFA nationality.

Nat.	Name	Position	Date of birth (age)	Signed from
(Algeria)	Boukhalfa Branci	GK	18 June 1952 (aged 23)	(Algeria) Youth system
(Algeria)	Djamel Keddou	DF	30 January 1952 (aged 23)	(Algeria) Youth system
(Algeria)	Abdelmalek Ali Messaoud	DF	27 May 1955 (aged 20)	(Algeria) HAMRA Annaba
(Algeria)	Reda Abdouche	DF	24 July 1952 (aged 23)	(Algeria)
(Algeria)	Rachid Laâla	DF	12 April 1950 (aged 25)	(Algeria)
(Algeria)	Rachid Debbah	DF	23 March 1948 (aged 27)	(Algeria) Youth system
(Algeria)	Abdelmalek Laroui	DF		(Algeria)
(Algeria)	Nacer Ouari	DF	30 January 1954 (aged 21)	(Algeria)
(Algeria)	Abdelkader Saâdi	MF	24 February 1948 (aged 27)	(Algeria) Youth system
(Algeria)	Khelifa Benmessaoud	MF	23 September 1951 (aged 23)	(Algeria) JSM Tiaret
(Algeria)	Bachir Zitoune	MF		(Algeria)
(Algeria)	Smaïl Slimani	MF	31 December 1956 (aged 18)	(Algeria) Youth system
(Algeria)	Nacer Guedioura	FW	4 November 1954 (aged 20)	(Algeria) Youth system
(Algeria)	Hocine Rabet	FW	6 March 1953 (aged 22)	(Algeria) HAMRA Annaba
(Algeria)	Djamel Zidane	FW	28 April 1955 (aged 20)	(Algeria) Youth system
(Algeria)	Kamel Tchalabi	FW	24 April 1947 (aged 28)	(Algeria) OM Saint Eugènoise
(Algeria)	Abderrahmane Meziani	FW	12 May 1942 (aged 33)	(France) AS Saint Eugène
(Algeria)	Abdelmalek Zeribet	FW	24 June 1949 (aged 26)	(Algeria)
(Algeria)	Mustapha Amenouche	FW	29 June 1954 (aged 21)	(Algeria)
(Algeria)	Mustapha Déraoui	FW		(Algeria)

== Competitions ==
=== Overview ===
Competition	Record								Started round	Final position / round	First match	Last match
Competition	G	W	D	L	GF	GA	GD	Win %	Started round	Final position / round	First match	Last match
National I	30	14	8	8	52	29	+23	46.67	—N/a	4th	14 September 1975	27 June 1976
Algerian Cup	1	0	0	1	1	2	−1	0.00	Round of 32		22 January 1976	
Total	31	14	8	9	53	31	+22	45.16				

=== Nationale I ===
==== League table ====
Pos	Team	Pld	W	D	L	GF	GA	GD	Pts
2	NA Hussein Dey	30	18	6	6	43	20	+23	72
3	JS Kawkabi	30	16	7	7	42	23	+19	69
4	USM Alger	30	14	8	8	52	29	+23	66
5	ES Sétif	30	12	11	7	55	35	+20	65
6	RC Kouba	30	15	6	9	46	28	+18	65 (Note: 1 point deducted?)

Source: rsssf.com

==== Results by round ====
Round	1	2	3	4	5	6	7	8	9	10	11	12	13	14	15	16	17	18	19	20	21	22	23	24	25	26	27	28	29	30
Ground	H	A	A	H	A	H	A	H	A	H	A	H	A	H	A	A	H	H	A	H	A	H	A	H	A	H	A	H	A	H
Result	W	D	W	W	L	D	L	W	D	D	L	W	L	D	L	L	W	W	D	L	L	L	D	W	W	W	W	W	L	W
Position				1	3	2			5	4		5	6	7																

Source: Competitive matches
A = Away; H = Home; W = Win; D = Draw; L = Loss

=== Matches ===
Win Draw Loss

14 September 1975 Round 1	USM Alger	2–0	MO Constantine
Note: Lineup for USM Alger - , , , , , , , , , , .

21 September 1975 Round 2	WA Boufarik	1–1	USM Alger
Note: Lineup for USM Alger - , , , , , , , , , , .

28 September 1975 Round 3	USM Khenchela	0–1	USM Alger
Note: Lineup for USM Alger - , , , , , , , , , , .

5 October 1975 Round 4	USM Alger	4–2	MC Oran	Algiers
	Zidane 30'; Guedioura 32'; Benmessaoud 36'; Guedioura 69'	Report	Belgot 20'; Belkedrouci 35'	Stadium: 20 August 1955 Stadium; Attendance: 7.090; Referee: Ben Amghar, Mohandi, Kamiche
Note: Lineup for USM Alger - Branci, Lala, Ali Messaoud, Saâdi, Abdouche, Keddou, Slimani, Zidane, Zitoun, Guedioura, Ben Messaoud (Mustapha Amenouche) - Coach: Ahmed Arab

11 October 1975 Round 5	USM Maison carrée	1–0	USM Alger	Algiers
	Hamoui 55'	Report		Stadium: 20 August 1955 Stadium; Attendance: 15.000; Referee: Benkadja, Traikia, Benamghar
Note: Lineup for USM Alger - Branci, Lala, Ali Messaoud, Saâdi, Abdouche, Keddou, Zeribet, Zitoun, Guedioura, Ben Messaoud (Slimani puis Mustapha Amenouche), Zidane - Coach: Ahmed Arab

18 October 1975 Round 6	USM Alger	1–1	CR Belcourt	Algiers
	Zidane 17'	Report	Messahel 3'	Stadium: Stade du 5 Juillet; Attendance: 7.131 (45.114 DA); Referee: Mokhfi
Note: Lineup for USM Alger - Branci, Lala, Ali Messaoud, Saâdi, Abdouche, Keddou, Zeribet, Mustapha Amenouche, Zidane, Zitoun, Guedioura - Coach: Ahmed Arab

26 October 1975 Round 7	JS Kawkabi	2–0	USM Alger	Tizi Ouzou
	Derridj 30'; Aouis 76'			Stadium: Stade Oukil-Ramdane; Referee: Kaid
Note: Lineup for USM Alger - Branci, Lala, Ali Messaoud, Saâdi, Abdouche, Keddou, Zitoun, Benmessaoud, Rabet (Slimani puis Ouar), Guedioura, Zidane - Coach: Ahmed Arab

2 November 1975 Round 8	USM Alger	3–0	USM Annaba (Note: USM Annaba mentioned in this article is a club founded in 1944 now called HAMRA Annaba. Not to be confused with the current USM Annaba, a club based in the same city but founded in 1983.)	Algiers
	Guedioura 50'; Rabet 54'; Benmessaoud 64'			Stadium: Stade du 5 Juillet; Attendance: 1,345 (11,158 DA)
Note: Lineup for USM Alger - Branci, Lala, Ali Messaoud, Saâdi, Abdouche, Keddou, Zitoun, Benmessaoud, Rabet (Slimani puis Ouar), Guedioura, Zidane - Coach: Ahmed Arab

9 November 1975 Round 9	ES Sétif	0–0	USM Alger	Sétif
		Report		Stadium: Stade Mohamed Guessab; Referee: ?, Senoussi, Benchedad
Note: Lineup for USM Alger - Branci, Lala, Ali Messaoud, Saâdi, Abdouche, Keddou, Zeribet (Ouari puis Zitoun), Rabet, Zidane, Deraoui, Benmessaoud - Coach: Hamid Madani

16 November 1975 Round 10	USM Alger	1–1	MC Alger	Algiers
	Keddou 42'; Laâla (yellow card)	Report	Azzouz 27' (pen.)	Stadium: Stade du 5 Juillet; Attendance: 35,677 (231,904 DA); Referee: Mohandi
Note: Lineup for USM Alger - Branci, Lala, Ali Messaoud, Sâadi, Abdouche, Keddou, Rabet, Zitoun (Zeribet), Deraoui, Benmessaoud, Zidane - Coach: Abdelghani Zitouni

23 November 1975 Round 11	CA Batna	1–0	USM Alger	Batna
				Stadium: Mustapha Seffouhi Stadium
Note: Lineup for USM Alger - , , , , , , , , , , .

30 November 1975 Round 12	USM Alger	11–0	ASM Oran	Algiers
19:00	Zidane 4', 29', 57', 59', 86'; Deraoui 25', 73'; Benmessaoud 21', 83'; Rabet 15'; Guedioura 90'	Report		Stadium: Stade du 5 Juillet; Attendance: 1,067 (8,837 DA); Referee: Kermiche
Note: Lineup for USM Alger - Branci (Amiri), Lala, Abdouche, Messaoud, Keddou (c), Zitoun, Zéribet, Rabet, Benmessaoud, Deraoui (Guedioura), Zidane - Coach: Abdelghani Zitouni

7 December 1975 Round 13	RC Kouba	1–0	USM Alger	Algiers
	Bédjaoui 49'	Report		Stadium: Stade du 5 Juillet; Attendance: 23,266 (151,098 DA); Referee: Charmat
Note: Lineup for USM Alger - Branci, Lala, Ali Messaoud Abdelmalek, Keddou, Abdouche, Zéribet, Rabet, Zitoun, Benmessaoud, Déraoui (Guedioura) , Zidane.- Coach: Ahmed Arab

14 December 1975 Round 14	USM Alger	0–0	NA Hussein Dey	Algiers
		Report		Stadium: Stade du 5 Juillet; Attendance: 27,135 (175,453 DA); Referee: Benghezal
Note: Lineup for USM Alger - Branci, Lala, Ali Messaoud Abdelmalek, Abdouche, Zéribet (Ouari), Saâdi, Rabet, Zitoun, Guedioura, Déraoui (Tchalabi), Zidane.- Coach: Ahmed Arab

16 January 1976 Round 15	USM Bel Abbès	1–0	USM Alger	Sidi Bel Abbès
				Stadium: Stade des Trois Frère Amarouche
Note: Lineup for USM Alger - , , , , , , , , , , .

25 January 1976 Round 16	MO Constantine	4–0	USM Alger
Note: Lineup for USM Alger - , , , , , , , , , , .

8 February 1976 Round 17	USM Alger	2–1	WA Boufarik
Note: Lineup for USM Alger - , , , , , , , , , , .

22 February 1976 Round 18	USM Alger	1–0	USM Khenchela
Note: Lineup for USM Alger - , , , , , , , , , , .

28 February 1976 Round 19	MC Oran	1–1	USM Alger
Note: Lineup for USM Alger - , , , , , , , , , , .

14 March 1976 Round 20	USM Alger	3–2	USM Maison carrée	Algiers
				Stadium: 20 August 1955 Stadium
Note: Lineup for USM Alger - , , , , , , , , , , .

21 March 1976 Round 21	CR Belouizdad	2–1	USM Alger
Note: Lineup for USM Alger - , , , , , , , , , , .

28 March 1976 Round 22	USM Alger	1–3	JS Kabylie
Note: Lineup for USM Alger - , , , , , , , , , , .

11 April 1976 Round 23	HAMRA Annaba	1–1	USM Alger
Note: Lineup for USM Alger - , , , , , , , , , , .

9 May 1976 Round 24	USM Alger	3–2	ES Sétif
Note: Lineup for USM Alger - , , , , , , , , , , .

16 May 1976 Round 25	MC Alger	0–1	USM Alger	Algiers
			Guedioura 74'	Stadium: Stade du 5 Juillet; Referee: Kaid
Note: Lineup for USM Alger - Branci, Lala, Ouari, Zeribet, Abdouche, Keddou, Slimani, Laroui (Sâadi), Guedioura, Benmessaoud (c) (Zitoun), Zidane - Coach: Abdelghani Zitouni

23 May 1976 Round 26	USM Alger	3–0	CA Batna
Note: Lineup for USM Alger - , , , , , , , , , , .

30 May 1976 Round 27	ASM Oran	0–2	USM Alger
Note: Lineup for USM Alger - , , , , , , , , , , .

6 June 1976 Round 28	USM Alger	1–0	RC Kouba
Note: Lineup for USM Alger - , , , , , , , , , , .

13 June 1976 Round 29	NA Hussein Dey	2–1	USM Alger
Note: Lineup for USM Alger - , , , , , , , , , , .

27 June 1976 Round 30	USM Alger	8–2	USM Bel Abbès	Algiers
	Guedioura 30'; Zitoune 49', 63', 73'; Amenouche 59', 60', 86', 89'	Report	Tabet Derraz 11'; Benchinoun 89'	Stadium: Stade du 5 Juillet; Attendance: 768 (4,843 DA); Referee: Traïkia, Taieb, Kazzoula
Note: Lineup for USM Alger - Branci, Laâla, Ouari, Zeribet, Abdouche, Slimani (Zitoune), Laroui (Aoulmi), Guedioura, Amenouche, Boudjlida- Coach: Abdelghani Zitouni

=== Algerian Cup ===
22 January 1976 Round of 32	WA Boufarik	1–2	USM Alger
Note: Lineup for USM Alger - , , , , , , , , , , .

== Squad information ==
=== Playing statistics ===
Pos	Player	Nat	National I			Algerian Cup			Total		
Pos	Player	Nat	App	St	G	App	St	G	App	St	G
Goalkeepers
GK	Boukhalfa Branci	(Algeria)	10	10	0	0	0	0	0	0	0
GK	Amiri	(Algeria)	1	0	0	0	0	0	0	0	0
Defenders
DF	Djamel Keddou	(Algeria)	8	8	1	0	0	0	0	0	0
DF	Abdelmalek Ali Messaoud	(Algeria)	8	8	0	0	0	0	0	0	0
DF	Rachid Laâla	(Algeria)	10	10	0	0	0	0	0	0	0
DF	Reda Abdouche	(Algeria)	10	10	0	0	0	0	0	0	0
DF	Nacer Ouari	(Algeria)	4	2	0	0	0	0	0	0	0
DF	Abdelmalek Laroui	(Algeria)	2	2	0	0	0	0	0	0	0
DF	Rachid Debbah	(Algeria)	0	0	0	0	0	0	0	0	0
Midfielders
MF	Khelifa Benmessaoud	(Algeria)	7	7	3	0	0	0	0	0	0
MF	Abdelkader Saâdi	(Algeria)	7	6	0	0	0	0	0	0	0
MF	Bachir Zitoune	(Algeria)	9	6	3	0	0	0	0	0	0
MF	Smaïl Slimani	(Algeria)	4	3	0	0	0	0	0	0	0
Forwards
FW	Djamel Zidane	(Algeria)	9	9	7	0	0	0	0	0	0
FW	Nacer Guedioura	(Algeria)	8	6	5	0	0	0	0	0	0
FW	Hocine Rabet	(Algeria)	5	5	1	0	0	0	0	0	0
FW	Mustapha Amenouche	(Algeria)	4	2	4	0	0	0	0	0	0
FW	Mustapha Déraoui	(Algeria)	5	5	2	0	0	0	0	0	0
FW	Abdelmalek Zeribet	(Algeria)	9	8	0	0	0	0	0	0	0
FW	Kamel Tchalabi	(Algeria)	1	0	0	0	0	0	0	0	0
FW	Abderrahmane Meziani	(Algeria)	0	0	0	0	0	0	0	0	0
?	Aoulmi	(Algeria)	1	0	0	0	0	0	0	0	0
LW	Boudjlida	(Algeria)	1	1	0	0	0	0	0	0	0
Total			30		52	1		1	31		53

Last updated: 17 June 2022

=== Goalscorers ===
Includes all competitive matches. The list is sorted alphabetically by surname when total goals are equal.

Nat.	Player	Pos.	N 1	AC	Total
(Algeria)	Djamel Zidane	FW	7	0	0
(Algeria)	Nacer Guedioura	FW	6	0	0
(Algeria)	Mustapha Amenouche	FW	4	0	0
(Algeria)	Khelifa Benmessaoud	MF	4	0	0
(Algeria)	Bachir Zitoune	MF	3	0	0
(Algeria)	Mustapha Déraoui	MF	2	0	0
(Algeria)	Hocine Rabet	FW	2	0	0
(Algeria)	Djamel Keddou	DF	1	0	0
Own goals			0	0	0
Totals			29	0	0

=== Clean sheets ===
Includes all competitive matches.

				Clean sheets		
Nat	Name	GP	GA	N I	AC	Total
(Algeria)	Boukhalfa Branci	9	9	2	0	2
(Algeria)	Amiri	1	0	0	0	0
	Totals		9	2	0	2

=== Hat-tricks ===
Player	Against	Result	Date	Competition	Ref
(Algeria) Djamel Zidane^{5}	ASM Oran	11–0 (H)	30 November 1975	Nationale I	
(Algeria) Mustapha Amenouche^{4}	USM Bel Abbès	8–2 (H)	27 June 1976	Nationale I	
(Algeria) Bachir Zitoune	USM Bel Abbès	8–2 (H)	27 June 1976	Nationale I	

(H) – Home; (A) – Away; (N) – Neutral

== USM Alger 11–0 ASM Oran ==
USM Alger 11–0 ASM Oran
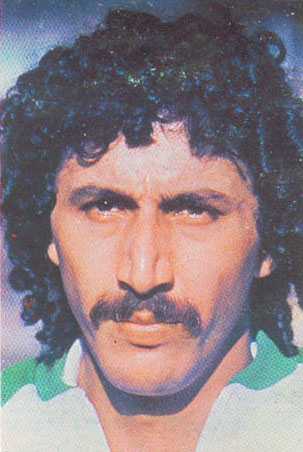
- Djamel Zidane the man who scored five goals.
- Event: 1975–76 Nationale I
USM Alger	ASM Oran
11	0
- Date: 30 November 1975
- Venue: Stade 5 Juillet 1962, Algiers
- Man of the Match: Djamel Zidane
- Referee: Kermiche
- Attendance: 1,067

On 30 November 1975, USM Alger faced ASM Oran in a Nationale I fixture at Stade 5 Juillet 1962, during the 1975–76 season. ASM Oran were newly promoted to the National II. USM Alger won the match 11–0, recording their biggest ever top-flight win, and inflicting ASM Oran's heaviest ever defeat. five different players scored for USM Alger, Including five goals by Djamel Zidane.

== Match ==
=== Summary ===
In the 12th round of Nationale I, The Stade du 5 Juillet witnessed one of the most spectacular performances in the history of Algerian football. On this day, USM Alger demolished ASM Oran with an astonishing 11–0 victory, one of the heaviest scorelines ever recorded in the national championship. Under a grey sky and on a water-logged pitch, USMA imposed their rhythm from the very first minutes. After just four minutes, Djamel Zidane opened the scoring, setting the tone for what would become a completely one sided encounter. USMA’s attack, in great form, overwhelmed a struggling Oranese defense that appeared powerless throughout the match.

Zidane was the undisputed man of the match, scoring five goals (4’, 29’, 57’, 59’, 86’), achieving one of the greatest individual feats of the era. Khelifa Benmessaoud (21’, 83’) and Mustapha Déraoui (25’, 73’) each scored twice, while Hocine Rabet (15’) and Nacer Guedioura (90’) added the remaining goals. Despite the difficult field conditions, USMA played with fluidity, confidence and total dominance, creating chance after chance. ASMO, considered one of the weakest sides of the season, were unable to offer the slightest resistance. This 11–0 victory stands as a major landmark in the history of both the club and the Algerian league.

USMA’s biggest win on record, one of the largest victories in Algerian football history and a notable individual performance by Zidane. Beyond the score, this match highlights the offensive strength of USM Alger during that period and remains an essential reference for the club’s historians. This remains the heaviest victory ever recorded at the Stade du 5 Juillet in all competitions since its inauguration.

30 November 1975
19:00

USM Alger	11–0	ASM Oran
Zidane 4', 29', 57', 59', 86'; Deraoui 25', 73'; Benmessaoud 21', 83'; Rabet 15'; Guedioura 90'	Report

Stade 5 Juillet 1962, Algiers
Attendance: 1,067 (8.837 DA)
Referee: Kermiche

USM Alger	ASM Oran

GK	1	(Algeria) Boukhalfa Branci	(substituted off) ?'
DF	2	(Algeria) Rachid Lala
DF	3	(Algeria) Réda Abdouche
DF	4	(Algeria) Abdelmalek Ali Messaoud
DF	5	(Algeria) Djamel Keddou (c)
MF	6	(Algeria) Bachir Zitoune
MF	7	(Algeria) Abdelmalek Zeribet
MF	8	(Algeria) Hocine Rabet
MF	9	(Algeria) Khelifa Benmessaoud
FW	10	(Algeria) Mustapha Déraoui	(substituted off) ?'
FW	11	(Algeria) Djamel Zidane
Substitutes:
GK	12	(Algeria) Amiri	(substituted on) ?'
FW	13	(Algeria) Nacer Guedioura	(substituted on) ?'
Manager:
(Algeria) Abdelghani Zitouni

GK	??	(Algeria) Aïssaoui
DF	??	(Algeria) Hanache
DF	??	(Algeria) Zine
DF	??	(Algeria) Mohamed Belkheïra
DF	??	(Algeria) Noureddine	(substituted off) ?'
MF	??	(Algeria) Mokhtar Bouhizeb
MF	??	(Algeria) Boudia
MF	??	(Algeria) Khaïne
MF	??	(Algeria) Belmoukhtar
FW	??	(Algeria) Nacer
FW	??	(Algeria) Hamou
Substitutes:
	??	(Algeria) Chabane	(substituted on) ?'	(substituted off) ?'
	??	(Algeria) Benarba	(substituted on) ?'
Manager:
(Algeria)

Assistant referees:

Match rules

- 90 minutes
- Five named substitutions
- Maximum of two substitutions
