= 1978 Algerian Cup final =

- Stade du 5 Juillet hosted the match
- Event: 1977–78 Algerian Cup
CR Belcourt	USM Alger
0	0
- CR Belcourt won 2–0 on penalties
- Date: May 1, 1978
- Venue: Stade 5 Juillet 1962, Algiers
- Referee: Mohamed Hansal
- Attendance: 80.000

The 1978 Algerian Cup final was the 16th final of the Algerian Cup. The final took place on May 1, 1978, at Stade 5 Juillet 1962 in Algiers with kick-off at 20:00. CR Belcourt won over USK Alger on a penalty shootout after the teams were still tied, 0 to 0, following 30 minutes of extra time. In the shootout, Belcourt outscored Alger, 2 to 0. The match was played before 80,000 people at the Stade du 5 Juillet.

== Pre-match ==
=== Details ===
May 1, 1978
20:00

CR Belcourt	0–0 (a.e.t.)	USM Alger
	(in French)
Penalties
Belili (penalty scored); Tlemcani (penalty scored); Bouhalissa (penalty missed)	2–0	(penalty missed) Akli; (penalty missed) Amenouche; (penalty missed) Zitoune; (penalty missed) Bouthlidja

Stade 5 Juillet 1962, Algiers
Attendance: 80.000
Referee: Mohamed Hansal

CR Belcourt	USM Alger

GK	0	(Algeria) El-Am
0	(Algeria) Dahmani
0	(Algeria) Bouhalissa
0	(Algeria) Laribi
0	(Algeria) Chekroun
0	(Algeria) Ighili
0	(Algeria) Bellili
0	(Algeria) Mustapha Kouici
0	(Algeria) Hocine Benmiloudi	Substituted off
0	(Algeria) Hamai	Substituted off
0	(Algeria) Djamel Tlemçani
Substitutes :
0	(Algeria) Tahir	Substituted in
0	(Algeria) Talbi	Substituted in
Manager :
(Algeria) Ahmad Arab

GK	0	(Algeria) Djamel Bouichaoui
DF	0	(Algeria) Abderrahmane Derouaz
DF	0	(Algeria) Abdelmalek Ali Messaoud
DF	0	(Algeria) Réda Abdouche
CB	0	(Algeria) Djamel Keddou (c)
DF	0	(Algeria) Ali Slimani
MF	0	(Algeria) Hocine Rabet	Substituted off
	0	(Algeria) Zitoun
FW	0	(Algeria) Nacer Guedioura	Substituted off
	0	(Algeria) Amenouche
	0	(Algeria) Sellaoui
Substitutes :
	0	(Algeria) Ben Bouteldja	Substituted in
FW	0	(Algeria) Nasreddine Akli	Substituted in
Manager :
(Algeria) Belkacem Mokdadi

MATCH OFFICIALS

- Assistant referees:
- Fourth official:

MATCH RULES

- 90 minutes.
- 30 minutes of extra-time if necessary.
- Penalty shootout if scores still level.
- Two named substitutes.
- Maximum of two substitutions.
