= 1982–83 USM Alger season =

USM Alger
1982–83 season
- Chairman: Saïd Hammo
- Head coach: Djillali & Abdelkader Zerrar
- Stadium: Stade Omar Hammadi
- National 1: 16th
- Algerian Cup: Round of 16
- Cup Winners' Cup: Quarterfinals
- Top goalscorer: League: Nacer Guedioura (6 goals); Oukid Azzouz (6 goals); All: Nacer Guedioura (7 goals)
- Highest home attendance: 15.000 vs. JE Tizi-Ouzou (10 December 1982)
- Lowest home attendance: 1.439 vs. MC Alger (25 March 1983)
- Average home league attendance: 7,090
Home colours

In the 1982–83 season, USM Alger is competing in the National for the 12th time, as well as the Algerian Cup. It is their 2nd consecutive season in the top flight of Algerian football. They will be competing in National 1 and the Algerian Cup.

== Squad list ==
Players and squad numbers last updated on 1 September 1982.
Note: Flags indicate national team as has been defined under FIFA eligibility rules. Players may hold more than one non-FIFA nationality.

Nat.	Position	Name	Date of Birth (Age)	Signed from
Goalkeepers
(Algeria)	GK	Kamel Kadri	19 November 1963 (aged 18)	(Algeria) MC Alger
(Algeria)	GK	Yacine Bentalaa	24 September 1955 (aged 27)	(Algeria) RC Kouba
Defenders
(Algeria)	DF	Farid Bengana	14 July 1963 (aged 19)	Youth system
(Algeria)	DF	Abdelmalek Ali Messaoud	27 May 1955 (aged 27)	(Algeria) Hamra Annaba
(Algeria)	DF	Abderrahmane Derouaz	12 December 1955 (aged 26)	Youth system
(Algeria)	CB	Djamel Keddou	30 January 1952 (aged 30)	Youth system
(Algeria)	DF	Samir Keddou	21 June 1961 (aged 21)	Youth system
(Algeria)	DF	Samir Osmane	17 November 1964 (aged 17)	Youth system
(Algeria)	LB / RB	M'hamed Soumatia	21 October 1958 (aged 23)	Youth system
Midfielders
(Algeria)	MF	Hocine Rabet	6 March 1953 (aged 29)	(Algeria) Hamra Annaba
(Algeria)	CM	Salim Boutamine	3 April 1962 (aged 20)	Youth system
(Algeria)	MF	Farid Mouaci	27 February 1964 (aged 18)	Youth system
(Algeria)	MF	Athmane Nourine	16 May 1965 (aged 17)	Youth system
(Algeria)	MF	Brahim Diab		
(Algeria)	MF	Ali Rabah Talbi		
(Algeria)	MF	Tayeb Zahmoul		
Forwards
(Algeria)	FW	Oukid Azzouz		
(Algeria)	FW	Nacer Guedioura	4 November 1954 (aged 27)	Youth system
(Algeria)	FW	Mohamed Benmohamed		
(Algeria)	FW	Fodil Djebbar		

== Competitions ==
=== Overview ===
Competition	Record								Started round	Final position / round	First match	Last match
Competition	G	W	D	L	GF	GA	GD	Win %	Started round	Final position / round	First match	Last match
National	30	8	10	12	25	34	−9	26.67	—N/a	16th	1 October 1982	17 June 1983
Algerian Cup	3	2	0	1	2	2	+0	66.67	Round of 32	Round of 16	4 February 1983	3 March 1983
Cup Winners' Cup	2	1	0	1	2	3	−1	50.00	Quarter-final		3 September 1982	3 September 1982
Total	35	11	10	14	29	39	−10	31.43				

=== Championnat National ===
==== League table ====
Pos	Team	Pld	W	D	L	GF	GA	GD	Pts	Qualification or relegation
12	GCR Mascara	30	11	6	13	29	32	−3	58	
13	WO Boufarik	30	11	6	13	31	38	−7	58	
14	RS Kouba	30	10	7	13	30	34	−4	57	
15	ISM Aïn Béïda	30	10	7	13	25	33	−8	57	Relegated
16	USK Alger	30	8	10	12	21	31	−10	56	Relegated

Source: rsssf.com

=== Results by round ===
Round	1	2	3	4	5	6	7	8	9	10	11	12	13	14	15	16	17	18	19	20	21	22	23	24	25	26	27	28	29	30
Ground	H	H	H	A	H	A	H	A	H	A	H	A	H	H	A	A	A	A	H	A	H	A	H	A	H	A	H	A	A	H
Result	W	L	W	D	D	D	D	L	L	L	D	L	D	L	L	L	L	L	W	D	W	L	D	W	W	W	W	D	D	L
Position	15	15	13	14	8	9	8	9	11	12	12	12	12	14	16	16	16	16	16	16	16	16	16	16	16	16	13	15	13	16

Source: Competitive matches
A = Away; H = Home; W = Win; D = Draw; L = Loss

=== Matches ===
22 October 1982 Round 1	USK Alger	2–1	EP Sétif	Bologhine
	Guedioura 1'; Diab 90' Kesraoui, Ali Messaoud, Azzouz, Bengana, Berakni, Boutamine, Daoud, Rabet, Soumatia, Talbi – (Substitutes) Derouaz, Diab.		Khalfa 39'	Stadium: Omar Hamadi Stadium; Attendance: 7.138; Referee: Djezzar

19 November 1982 Round 2	USK Alger	0–3	MA Hussein Dey	Algiers
	Kesraoui, Ali Messaoud, Azzouz, Bengana, Bengouia, Daoud, Derouaz, Diab, Djebbar, S.Keddou, Talbi, Zahmoul – (Substitutes) Benmohamed.		Guenoun 7', 79'; Atrouche 80'	Stadium: 20 August 1955 Stadium; Referee: Kouras

1 October 1982 Round 3	USK Alger	2–1	ESM Bel-Abbès	Bologhine
	Boutamine 17', 85' Kesraoui, Benmohamed, Berakni, Boutamine, Daoud, Derouaz, Diab, Djebbar, S.Keddou, Soumatia, Talbi – (Substitutes) Ali Messaoud, Rabet.		Abed 80'	Stadium: Omar Hamadi Stadium; Attendance: 6.000; Referee: Roumani

8 October 1982 Round 4	GCR Mascara	1–1	USK Alger	Mascara
			Boutamine ?'	Stadium: Stade Meftah Aouad

15 October 1982 Round 5	USK Alger	1–1	WKF Collo	Bologhine
	Azzouz 33' Kesraoui, Ali Messaoud, Azzouz, Bengana, Benmohamed, Boutamine, Daoud, Soumatia, Talbi, Rabet, Zahmoul – (Substitutes) Diab, Guedioura			Stadium: Omar Hamadi Stadium; Attendance: 5.461

29 October 1982 Round 6	MP Alger	0–0	USK Alger	Algiers
		Report	Kesraoui, Ali Messaoud, Azzouz, Bengana, Berakni, Boutamine, Daoud, Derouaz, Guedioura, Soumatia, Talbi – (Substitutes) Diab, Djebbar.	Stadium: Stade du 5 Juillet; Attendance: 44.957; Referee: Mohammed Garoui

5 November 1982 Round 7	USK Alger	1–1	ASC Oran	Bologhine
	? ?'			Stadium: Omar Hamadi Stadium

12 November 1982 Round 8	ESM Guelma	2–0	USK Alger	Guelma
			Kesraoui, Ali Messaoud, Azzouz (Benmohamed), Bengana, Bengouia, Daoud, Derouaz, Diab, Djebbar, Samir Keddou, Talbi, Zahmoul

26 November 1982 Round 9	USK Alger	0–1	CM Belcourt	Algiers
	Kadri, Ali Messaoud, Azzouz, Bengana, Benmohamed, Berakni, Boutamine, Daoud, Derouaz, Samir Keddou, Talbi – (Substitutes) Diab, Zahmoul.		Doudouh 62'	Stadium: Stade du 5 Juillet; Attendance: 3.720

3 December 1982 Round 10	ISM Aïn Béïda	2–1	USK Alger	Aïn Beïda
	Kouachi 14'; D Djertli 80'		Djebbar 13' Kadri, Ali Messaoud, Azzouz, Bengana, Benmohamed, Daoud, Derouaz, Diab, Djebbar, Samir Keddou, Talbi	Stadium: Stade 24 avril Referee: Mohamed Hansal

10 December 1982 Round 11	USK Alger	1–1	JE Tizi-Ouzzou	Bologhine
	Azzouz 25' Kadri, Azzouz, Bengana, Boutamine, Daoud, ????, Derouaz, D.Keddou, Talbi, Rabet, Zahmoul – (Substitutes) Diab, Seiffoune.		Bahbouh 57'	Stadium: Omar Hamadi Stadium; Attendance: 15.000; Referee: Belaïd Lacarne

24 December 1982 Round 12	WO Boufarik	1–0	USK Alger	Boufarik
				Stadium: Stade Mohamed Reggaz

31 December 1982 Round 13	USK Alger	1–1	RS Kouba	Algiers
	? ?' Kadri, Azzouz, Bengana, Boutamine, Daoud, Guedioura, D.Keddou, S.Keddou, Rabet, Soumatia, Zahmoul – (Substitutes) Derouaz, Diab.		Bourballa 28'	Stadium: Stade du 5 Juillet; Attendance: 4.662; Referee: Roumani

7 January 1983 Round 14	USK Alger	0–1	USM El Harrach	Algiers
	Kadri, Ali Messaoud, Azzouz, Boutamine, Daoud, Derouaz, Diab, Guedioura, Rabet, Soumatia, Zahmoul – (Substitutes) Berakni.		Rahem 81'	Stadium: Stade du 5 Juillet; Attendance: 5.398; Referee: Baghdadi

21 January 1983 Round 15	MP Oran	2–1	USK Alger	Oran
	Bendjahene 64'; Benmimoun 85'		Boutamine 80' Kadri, Ali Messaoud, Azzouz, Boutamine, Daoud, Derouaz, Guedioura, S.Keddou, Rabet, Soumatia, Talbi – (Substitutes) Djebbar.	Stadium: Ahmed Zabana Stadium; Attendance: 8.713; Referee: Belaïd Lacarne

28 January 1983 Round 16	EP Sétif	2–0	USK Alger	Sétif
	Saoud 59'; Adjissa 76'		Kesraoui, Ali Messaoud, Azzouz, Boutamine, Daoud, Derouaz, Guedioura, S.Keddou, Rabet, Soumatia, Talbi – (Substitutes) None.	Stadium: Stade 8 Mai 1945; Referee: Amar Ghotari

11 February 1983 Round 17	MA Hussein Dey	2–0	USK Alger	Algiers
	Guendouz 40'; Madjer 77'		Kadri, Ali Messaoud, Azzouz, Boutamine, Daoud, Derouaz, Diab, Guedioura, Djebbar, Soumatia, Talbi – (Substitutes) Bengana, Berakni	Stadium: Stade du 5 Juillet; Attendance: 2.359; Referee: Mohamed Hansal

18 February 1983 Round 18	ESM Bel-Abbès	2–1	USK Alger	Sidi Bel Abbes
			Azzouz 41' Kesraoui, Ali Messaoud, Azzouz, Boutamine, Daoud, Derouaz, Guedioura, Mouaci, Rabet, Soumatia, Talbi – (Substitutes) Diab.	Stadium: Stade 24 Fevrier 1956; Attendance: 3.273; Referee: Sayeh

11 March 1983 Round 19	USK Alger	1–0	GCR Mascara	Bologhine
	Azzouz 83' Kadri, Ali Messaoud, Azzouz, Bengana, Bengouia, Daoud, Derouaz, Guedioura, D.Keddou, Rabet, Seiffoune – (Substitutes) Nourine.			Stadium: Omar Hamadi Stadium; Attendance: 10.000; Referee: Seghiri

18 March 1983 Round 20	WKF Collo	0–0	USK Alger	Collo
				Stadium: Stade Benjamâa Amar

25 March 1983 Round 21	USK Alger	2–1	MP Alger	Algiers
	Azzouz 2'; Rabet 69' Kadri, Ali Messaoud, Azzouz, Bengana, Bengouia, Boutamine, Daoud, Derouaz, Osmane, Rabet, Seiffoune – (Substitutes) Diab, Nourine.	Report	Bousri 85' (pen.)	Stadium: Stade du 5 Juillet; Attendance: 1.439; Referee: Rachid Medjiba

8 April 1983 Round 22	ASC Oran	1–0	USK Alger	Oran
	R Guemri 79'		Kadri, Ali Messaoud, Bengana, Bengouia, Daoud, Derouaz, Djebbar, D.Keddou, Nourine, Rabet, Seiffoune – (Substitutes) Azzouz.	Stadium: Habib Bouakeul Stadium; Attendance: 6.350; Referee: Mohamed Mimoun

15 April 1983 Round 23	USK Alger	1–1	ESM Guelma	Bologhine
	Guedioura 21' Kadri, Ali Messaoud, Azzouz, Bengana, Bengouia, Daoud, Derouaz, Guedioura, D.Keddou, Rabet, Seiffoune – (Substitutes) S.Keddou, Nourine.		Boukraa 49'	Stadium: Omar Hamadi Stadium; Attendance: 7.900; Referee: Mohamed Hansal

22 April 1983 Round 24	CM Belcourt	1–2	USK Alger	Algiers
	Zaghzi 41'		Boutamine 26'; Rabet 82' Kadri, Ali Messaoud, Azzouz, Bengana, Boutamine, Daoud, Derouaz, Guedioura, Rabet, Seiffoune, Talbi – (Substitutes) Nourine.	Stadium: Stade du 5 Juillet; Attendance: 3.000; Referee: Sayeh

29 April 1983 Round 25	USK Alger	1–0	ISM Aïn Béïda	Bologhine
	Guedioura 63' (pen.) Kadri, Ali Messaoud, Azzouz, Bengana, Daoud, Derouaz, Guedioura, Nourine, Rabet, Soumatia, Talbi – (Substitutes) Seiffoune			Stadium: Omar Hamadi Stadium; Attendance: 8.000; Referee: Mohamed Hansal

27 May 1983 Round 26	JE Tizi Ouzou	0–1	USK Alger	Tizi Ouzou
			Rabet 69'	Stadium: November 1, 1954 Stadium

3 June 1983 Round 27	USK Alger	3–2	WO Boufarik	Bologhine
	Azzouz 60'; Guedioura 70', 82' (pen.) Kadri, Ali Messaoud, Azzouz, Bengana, Bengouia, Boutamine, Derouaz, Guedioura, Seiffoune, Soumatia, Nourine – (Substitutes) S.Keddou.		Tedjim 11'; Taleb 71'	Stadium: Omar Hamadi Stadium; Attendance: 7.461; Referee: Amar Ghotari

10 June 1983 Round 28	RS Kouba	1–1	USK Alger	Algiers
	Gougam 50'		Guedioura 27' Kadri, Ali Messaoud, Bengana, Boutamine, Derouaz, Diab, Guedioura, S.Keddou, Nourine, Seiffoune, Soumatia – (Substitutes) Daoud, Talbi	Stadium: Stade du 5 Juillet; Referee: Bensalem

13 June 1983 Round 29	USM El Harrach	1–1	USK Alger	Algiers
			?' ?	Stadium: Stade du 5 Juillet
Note: Lineup for USK Alger -

17 June 1983 Round 30	USK Alger	0–1	MP Oran	Bologhine
	Kadri, Ali Messaoud, Azzouz, Bengana, Derouaz, Guedioura, S.Keddou, Nourine, Seiffoune, Soumatia, Talbi – (Substitutes) Boutamine, Rabet		Baroudi 37' (pen.)	Stadium: Omar Hamadi Stadium; Attendance: 10.000; Referee: Amar Ghotari

=== Algerian Cup ===
4 February 1983 Round of 32	Nadi Oran	1–2	USK Alger
Note: Lineup for USK Alger -

3 March 1983 Round of 16	CM Belcourt	1–0	USK Alger
		Report
Note: Lineup for USK Alger -

=== African Cup Winners' Cup ===
==== Quarterfinals ====
3 September 1982 first leg	USK Alger (Algeria)	2–1	(Ghana) Hearts of Oak	Bologhine, Algeria
	Guedioura 19' (pen.); Djebbar 50' Kesraoui, Soumatia, Ali Messaoud, Daoud, Derouaz, Rabet (Bengana), Talbi, Slimani, Guedioura, Boutamine, Djebbar (Betrouni)		Nottey 44'	Stadium: Stade Omar Hammadi; Referee: Ben Mhida (Tunisia)

19 September 1982 Second leg	Hearts of Oak (Ghana)	2–0	(Algeria) USK Alger	Accra, Ghana
	Addu 10'; Kwadade 55'			Stadium: Accra Sports Stadium; Referee: Opang Ault (Republic of Congo)
Note: Lineup for USK Alger -

== Squad information ==
=== Appearances and goals ===
Only 24 games from 30 in National appearances
Round 2, 7, 12, 20, 26, 29.

No.	Pos	Nat	Player	Total		National		Algerian Cup		Cup Winners' Cup	
No.	Pos	Nat	Player	Apps	Goals	Apps	Goals	Apps	Goals	Apps	Goals
-	GK	(Algeria) ALG	Kamel Kadri	16	0	16	0	0	0	0	0
-	GK	(Algeria) ALG	Kesraoui	9	0	8	0	0	0	1	0
-	DF	(Algeria) ALG	Abdelmalek Ali Messaoud	23	0	22	0	0	0	1	0
-	DF	(Algeria) ALG	Farid Bengana	20	0	17+2	0	0	0	0+1	0
-	DF	(Algeria) ALG	Nacer Daoud	23	0	22	0	0	0	1	0
-	DF	(Algeria) ALG	Abderrahmane Derouaz	24	0	22+1	0	0	0	1	0
5	DF	(Algeria) ALG	Djamel Keddou	5	0	4+1	0	0	0	0	0
-	DF	(Algeria) ALG	Samir Keddou	11	0	9+2	0	0	0	0	0
-	DF	(Algeria) ALG	Samir Osmane	1	0	1	0	0	0	0	0
-	DF	(Algeria) ALG	Mohamed Soumatia	16	0	15	0	0	0	1	0
-	MF	(Algeria) ALG	Berakni	5	0	2+3	0	0	0	0	0
-	MF	(Algeria) ALG	Brahim Diab	15	1	14+1	1	0	0	0	0
-	MF	(Algeria) ALG	Salim Boutamine	20	5	18+1	5	0	0	1	0
-	MF	(Algeria) ALG	Athmane Nourine	9	0	7+2	0	0	0	0	0
-	MF	(Algeria) ALG	Hocine Rabet	17	3	13+3	3	0	0	1	0
-	MF	(Algeria) ALG	Seiffoune	10	0	7+3	0	0	0	0	0
-	MF	(Algeria) ALG	Ali Rabah Talbi	18	0	14+3	0	0	0	1	0
-	MF	(Algeria) ALG	Tayeb Zahmoul	6	0	2+4	0	0	0	0	0
-	FW	(Algeria) ALG	Oukid Azzouz	22	6	19+3	6	0	0	0	0
-	FW	(Algeria) ALG	Bengouia	6	0	4+2	0	0	0	0	0
-	FW	(Algeria) ALG	Mohamed Benmohamed	6	0	5+1	0	0	0	0	0
-	FW	(Algeria) ALG	Fodil Djebbar	9	1	7+1	1	0	0	1	0
-	FW	(Algeria) ALG	Nacer Guedioura	18	6	17	6	0	0	1	0
-	FW	(Algeria) ALG	Farid Mouaci	1	0	1	0	0	0	0	0

Last updated: 1 May 2017
Source: Competitions

=== Goalscorers ===
Includes all competitive matches. The list is sorted alphabetically by surname when total goals are equal.

No.	Nat.	Player	Pos.	N 1	AC	CWC	TOTAL
?	(Algeria)	Nacer Guedioura	FW	6	?	1	?
?	(Algeria)	Oukid Azzouz	FW	6	?	0	?
?	(Algeria)	Salim Boutamine	MF	5	?	0	?
?	(Algeria)	Hocine Rabet	MF	3	?	0	?
?	(Algeria)	Brahim Diab	MF	1	?	0	?
?	(Algeria)	Fodil Djebbar	FW	1	?	1	?
Own Goals				0	0	0	0
Totals				22+3	2	2	26+3
