= 1973 Palestine Cup of Nations squads =

Below are the squads for the 1973 Palestine Cup of Nations, hosted in Libya, and which took place between 11 and 26 August 1973.

== Group B ==
=== Algeria ===
Head coach: Saïd Amara

| No. | Pos. | Player | Date of birth (age) | Club |
|---|---|---|---|---|
| | GK | Mohamed Abrouk | 8 March 1943 (aged 30) | (Algerian Football Federation) CR Belcourt |
| | DF | Miloud Hadefi | 12 March 1949 (aged 24) | (Algerian Football Federation) MC Oran |
| | DF | Meziane Ighil | 12 January 1954 (aged 19) | (Algerian Football Federation) NA Hussein Dey |
| | DF | Djamel Keddou | 30 January 1952 (aged 21) | (Algerian Football Federation) USM Alger |
| | DF | Mohamed Khedis | 29 February 1952 (aged 21) | (Algerian Football Federation) NA Hussein Dey |
| | DF | Mohamed Madani | 23 May 1945 (aged 28) | (Algerian Football Federation) OMR El Annasser |
| | DF | Bouzid Mahiouz | 13 January 1952 (aged 21) | (Algerian Football Federation) MC Alger |
| | MF | Nasreddine Akli | 10 May 1953 (aged 20) | (Algerian Football Federation) USM Blida |
| | MF | Khelifa Benmessaoud | 23 September 1951 (aged 21) | (Algerian Football Federation) JSM Tiaret |
| | MF | Abdelhafid Fendi | 29 May 1951 (aged 22) | (Algerian Football Federation) MO Constantine |
| | MF | Ali Fergani | 21 September 1952 (aged 20) | (Algerian Football Federation) NA Hussein Dey |
| | MF | Abdelaziz Safsafi | 14 February 1954 (aged 19) | (Algerian Football Federation) RC Kouba |
| | FW | Mohamed Belbahri | 7 March 1953 (aged 20) | (Algerian Football Federation) MC Saïda |
| | FW | Omar Betrouni | 3 November 1949 (aged 23) | (Algerian Football Federation) MC Alger |
| | FW | Abdellah Djebbar | 6 April 1952 (aged 21) | (Algerian Football Federation) JS Kabylie |
| | FW | Nacer Guedioura | 4 November 1954 (aged 18) | (Algerian Football Federation) USM Alger |
