= 1971–72 USM Alger season =

USM Alger
1971–72 season
- President: Ali Kezzal
- Head coach: Ahmed Tedjini Lakehal (until ?); Ahmed Zitoun (from ?)
- Stadium: Stade des Frères Brakni (Note: Due to the events of last season in the Algerian Cup against USM Khenchela, the Algerian Football Federation punished USM Alger by playing 50 kilometers away from its stadium for one year.)
- National I: 15th
- Algerian Cup: Runners–up
- Top goalscorer: Abderrahmane Meziani (8 goals)

In the 1971–72 season, USM Alger competed in the Championnat National for the 6th season. They competed in Championnat National and the Algerian Cup.

== Summary season ==
In the Algerian Cup, the path to the final was not easy, with a difference of one goal in three games out of four before facing USM Annaba at the opening of the new Stade du 5 Juillet. The game ended in defeat. Before that and during the youth final against NAR Alger, Nacer Guedioura became the first to score a goal in the new stadium, which lead them to win the cup. The club was deprived of the services of Kamel Tchalabi who played in the military final and despite the fact that he was promised to play if he had participated in a half and scored, he did not participate in the match.

== Squad list ==
Players and squad numbers last updated on 1 September 1970.
Note: Flags indicate national team as has been defined under FIFA eligibility rules. Players may hold more than one non-FIFA nationality.

Nat.	Name	Position	Date of Birth (Age)	Signed from
(Algeria)	Sid Ahmed Zebaïri	GK	13 November 1948 (aged 22)	(Algeria) Youth system
(Algeria)	Boukhalfa Branci	GK	18 June 1952 (aged 19)	(Algeria) Youth system
(Algeria)	Rachid Debbah	LB	23 March 1948 (aged 23)	(Algeria) Youth system
(Algeria)	Djamel Keddou	DF	30 January 1952 (aged 19)	(Algeria) Youth system
(Algeria)	Reda Abdouche	DF	24 July 1952 (aged 19)	(Algeria)
(Algeria)	Rachid Laâla	DF	12 April 1950 (aged 21)	(Algeria)
(Algeria)	Mustapha Mansouri	DF		(Algeria)
(Algeria)	Saïd Allik	MF	24 April 1948 (aged 23)	(Algeria) Youth system
(Algeria)	Ahmed Lakhdar Attoui	MF	20 September 1948 (aged 22)	(Algeria) USM Annaba
(Algeria)	Mouldi Aïssaoui	MF	26 July 1946 (aged 25)	(Algeria) JBAC Annaba
(Algeria)	Boubekeur Belbekri	MF	7 January 1942 (aged 29)	(France) Gallia d’Alger
(Algeria)	Abdelkader Saâdi	MF	24 February 1948 (aged 23)	(Algeria) Youth system
(Algeria)	Abderrahmane Meziani	FW	12 May 1942 (aged 29)	(France) AS Saint Eugène
(Algeria)	Kamel Tchalabi	FW	24 April 1947 (aged 24)	(Algeria) OM Saint Eugènoise
(Algeria)	Kamel Berroudji	ST	6 September 1945 (aged 25)	(Algeria) OMR El Annasser
(Algeria)	Brahim Aouadj			(Algeria) MC Alger

== Competitions ==
=== Overview ===
Competition	Record								Started round	Final position / round	First match	Last match
Competition	G	W	D	L	GF	GA	GD	Win %	Started round	Final position / round	First match	Last match
National I	30	9	7	14	38	47	−9	30.00	—N/a	15th	5 September 1971	18 June 1972
Algerian Cup	5	4	0	1	8	5	+3	80.00	Round of 32	Runners–up	6 February 1972	25 June 1972
Total	35	13	7	15	46	52	−6	37.14				

=== Nationale I ===
==== League table ====
Pos	Team	Pld	W	D	L	GF	GA	GD	Pts
12	NR Ksentina	30	10	8	12	26	31	−5	58
13	USM Bel-Abbès	30	6	15	9	24	30	−6	57
14	WA Tlemcen	30	8	11	11	39	51	−12	57
15	USM Alger	30	9	7	14	38	47	−9	55
16	ES Guelma	30	3	7	20	25	63	−38	43

Source: rsssf.com

==== Results by round ====
Round	1	2	3	4	5	6	7	8	9	10	11	12	13	14	15	16	17	18	19	20	21	22	23	24	25	26	27	28	29	30
Ground	A	H	A	A	H	A	H	A	H	A	H	A	H	A	H	H	A	H	H	A	H	A	H	A	H	A	H	A	H	A
Result	W	D	L	D	W	D	W	L	D	L	L	L	L	L	W	L	L	D	W	L	L	L	W	D	L	W	W	W	D	L
Position																														

Source: Competitive matches
A = Away; H = Home; W = Win; D = Draw; L = Loss

=== Matches ===
Win Draw Loss

5 September 1971 Round 1	NAR Alger	1–2	USM Alger	Kouba
				Stadium: Mohamed Benhaddad Stadium
Note: Lineup for USM Alger -

12 September 1971 Round 2	USM Alger	1–1	MC Oran	Blida
				Stadium: Stade des Frères Brakni
Note: Lineup for USM Alger -

19 September 1971 Round 3	NR Ksentina	2–1	USM Alger	Constantine
				Stadium: Ramadane Ben Abdelmalek Stadium
Note: Lineup for USM Alger -

3 October 1971 Round 4	MO Constantine	1–1	USM Alger	Constantine
				Stadium: Ramadane Ben Abdelmalek Stadium
Note: Lineup for USM Alger -

10 October 1971 Round 5	USM Alger	3–1	JSM Tiaret	Blida
				Stadium: Stade des Frères Brakni
Note: Lineup for USM Alger -

17 October 1971 Round 6	NA Hussein Dey	0–0	USM Alger	Hussein Dey
				Stadium: Zioui Brothers Stadium
Note: Lineup for USM Alger -

24 October 1971 Round 7	USM Alger	2–0	USM Bel-Abbès	Blida
				Stadium: Stade des Frères Brakni
Note: Lineup for USM Alger -

8 November 1971 Round 8	ES Guelma	2–1	USM Alger	Guelma
				Stadium: Stade Abda Ali
Note: Lineup for USM Alger -

14 November 1971 Round 9	USM Alger	2–2	JS Kawkabi	Blida
				Stadium: Stade des Frères Brakni
Note: Lineup for USM Alger -

21 November 1971 Round 10	ASM Oran	5–1	USM Alger	Oran
				Stadium: Habib Bouakeul Stadium
Note: Lineup for USM Alger -

5 December 1971 Round 11	USM Alger	1–3	MC Alger	Blida
	Hamici 50'		Hassen Tahir 32'; Betrouni 78', 89'	Stadium: Stade des Frères Brakni; Referee: Benyelles
Note: Lineup for USM Alger - Branci, Lala, Debbah, Saâdi, Abdouche, Keddou, Berroudji, Mansouri (Bouras, 80'), Mohamed (Attoui Ahmed, 45'), Meziani, Hamici - Coach: Lakehal Ahmed Tedjini

12 December 1971 Round 12	WR Staïfi	2–1	USM Alger	Sétif
				Stadium: Stade Mohamed Guessab
Note: Lineup for USM Alger -

23 December 1971 Round 13	USM Alger	0–4	CR Belcourt	Blida
				Stadium: Stade des Frères Brakni
Note: Lineup for USM Alger -

23 January 1971 Round 14	WA Tlemcen	3–1	USM Alger	Tlemcen
				Stadium: Stade des 3 frères Zerga
Note: Lineup for USM Alger -

30 January 1971 Round 15	USM Alger	3–1	USM Annaba (Note: USM Annaba mentioned in this article is a club founded in 1944 now called HAMRA Annaba. Not to be confused with the current USM Annaba, a club based in the same city but founded in 1983.)	Blida
				Stadium: Stade des Frères Brakni
Note: Lineup for USM Alger -

13 February 1972 Round 16	USM Alger	0–3	NAR Alger	Blida
			Kaoua 48', 80'; Amirouche 85' (pen.)	Stadium: Stade des Frères Brakni
Note: Lineup for USM Alger -

20 February 1972 Round 17	MC Oran	3–2	USM Alger	Oran
				Stadium: Stade 19 juin 1965
Note: Lineup for USM Alger -

27 February 1972 Round 18	USM Alger	1–1	NR Ksentina	Blida
				Stadium: Stade des Frères Brakni
Note: Lineup for USM Alger -

18 March 1972 Round 19	USM Alger	3–0	MO Constantine	Blida
				Stadium: Stade des Frères Brakni
Note: Lineup for USM Alger -

2 April 1972 Round 20	JSM Tiaret	2–1	USM Alger	Tiaret
				Stadium: Stade Ait Abderrahim Ahmed
Note: Lineup for USM Alger -

9 April 1972 Round 21	USM Alger	0–1	NA Hussein Dey	Blida
			Abdelaziz Zarabi 5'	Stadium: Stade des Frères Brakni
Note: Lineup for USM Alger -

16 April 1972 Round 22	USM Bel-Abbès	3–0	USM Alger	Sidi Bel Abbès
				Stadium: Stade des Trois Frères Amarouche
Note: Lineup for USM Alger -

23 April 1972 Round 23	USM Alger	4–0	ES Guelma	Blida
				Stadium: Stade des Frères Brakni
Note: Lineup for USM Alger -

1 May 1972 Round 24	JS Kawkabi	1–1	USM Alger	Tizi Ouzou
				Stadium: Stade Oukil Ramdane
Note: Lineup for USM Alger -

7 May 1972 Round 25	USM Alger	0–1	ASM Oran	Blida
				Stadium: Stade des Frères Brakni
Note: Lineup for USM Alger -

14 May 1972 Round 26	MC Alger	0–1	USM Alger	Bologhine
			Tchalabi 39'	Stadium: Stade de Bologhine; Referee: Nabti
Note: Lineup for USM Alger - Branci, Lalla, Aouadj Brahim, Abdouche, Saâdi, Keddou, Tchalabi, Allik Said, Meziani, Aissaoui, Berroudji - Coach: Lakehal Ahmed Tedjini

21 May 1972 Round 27	USM Alger	1–0	WR Staïfi	Blida
				Stadium: Stade des Frères Brakni
Note: Lineup for USM Alger -

28 May 1972 Round 28	CR Belcourt	2–3	USM Alger	Belcourt
				Stadium: Stade 20 Août 1955
Note: Lineup for USM Alger -

11 June 1972 Round 29	USM Alger	1–1	WA Tlemcen	Blida
				Stadium: Stade des Frères Brakni
Note: Lineup for USM Alger -

18 June 1972 Round 30	USM Annaba	1–0	USM Alger	Annaba
				Stadium: Abdelkader Chabou Stadium
Note: Lineup for USM Alger -

=== Algerian Cup ===
6 February 1972 Round of 32	WA Mostaganem	1–2	USM Alger
Note: Lineup for USM Alger -

5 March 1972 Round of 16	USM Alger	3–2	MO Constantine
Note: Lineup for USM Alger -

26 March 1972 Quarter-finals	USM Alger	2–0	USM Bel Abbès
Note: Lineup for USM Alger -

26 April 1972 Semi-finals	USM Alger	1–0	NA Hussein Dey
Note: Lineup for USM Alger -

25 June 1972 Final	USM Annaba	2–0 (a.e.t.)	USM Alger	Algiers
	Abdelmajid Tadjet 93'; Rabah Boufermes 107' Helaïli, Bouadila (Hadjou), Ali Attoui, Salah Bounour, Zaïdi, Boulfoul, Boufermes, Ali Bounour, Tadjdet, Haoués, Bendjamaâ (Benslimane) - Coach: Mohammed Boufermes		Branci, Laala, A. Saadi, Aouadj, Ahmed Attoui, Keddou, Berroudji, Allik, Meziani (Mansouri), Aïssaoui, Hamici (Debbah) - Coach: Ahmed Zitoun	Stadium: Stade du 5 Juillet; Referee: Zoubir Benganif

== Squad information ==
=== Goalscorers ===
Includes all competitive matches. The list is sorted alphabetically by surname when total goals are equal.

Nat.	Player	Pos.	N 1	AC	TOTAL
(Algeria)	Abderrahmane Meziani	FW	8	0	0
(Algeria)	Mouldi Aïssaoui	MF	7	0	0
Own Goals			0	0	0
Totals			38	8	46
