= 1970–71 USM Alger season =

USM Alger
1970–71 season
- President: Ali Kezal
- Head coach: Ahmed Zitoun
- Stadium: Stade Omar Hammadi
- National I: 5th
- Algerian Cup: Runners–up
- Maghreb Cup Winners Cup: Fourth place
- Top goalscorer: League: Kamel Tchalabi (10 goals); Abderrahmane Meziani (10 goals); All: Kamel Tchalabi (11 goals)

In the 1970–71 season, USM Alger is competing in the Championnat National for the 5th season, as well as the Algerian Cup. They will be competing in Championnat National, and the Algerian Cup.

== Summary season ==
In 1970–71 Algerian Cup after a long march due to playing the quarter and semi-finals in home and away system Al-Ittihad reached the final to face in the Algiers Derby, MC Alger and be defeated again. before her in the semi-finals in Khenchela against the local team, Al-Ittihad was not welcomed because of a word used by USM Alger supporters which is that Khenchela is “Shawiya” a term that has been misinterpreted and they prepared a hostile reception, and the match lasted four hours due to the storming to the stadium several times by the supporters. After the end of the match USM Alger players who were accompanied by a handful of fans, remained locked in the dressing rooms until midnight and after the intervention of a Gendarmerie brigade sent from Batna. his return to Algiers was around 9 am the next day, then the Algerian Football Federation at that time punished the two clubs by playing 50 kilometers away from its stadium for one year. As for USM Alger it received in the 1971–72 season at Stade des Frères Brakni. USM Alger again participated in the Maghreb Cup Winners Cup as a runner-up of the Algerian Cup, finished in the last place with two defeats against Club Africain and Wydad Casablanca.

== Squad list ==
Players and squad numbers last updated on 1 September 1970.
Note: Flags indicate national team as has been defined under FIFA eligibility rules. Players may hold more than one non-FIFA nationality.

Nat.	Position	Name	Date of birth (age)	Signed from
(Algeria)	GK	Sid Ahmed Zebaïri	13 November 1948 (aged 22)	(Algeria) Youth system
(Algeria)	GK	Boukhalfa Branci	18 June 1952 (aged 18)	(Algeria) Youth system
(Algeria)	LB	Rachid Debbah	23 March 1948 (aged 22)	
(Algeria)	DF	Djamel Keddou	30 January 1952 (aged 18)	(Algeria) Youth system
(Algeria)	MF	Saïd Allik	24 April 1948 (aged 22)	(Algeria) Youth system
(Algeria)	MF	Ahmed Lakhdar Attoui	20 September 1948 (aged 22)	(Algeria) USM Annaba
(Algeria)	MF	Mouldi Aïssaoui	26 July 1946 (aged 24)	(Algeria) JBAC Annaba
(Algeria)	DF	Boubekeur Belbekri	7 January 1942 (aged 28)	(France) Gallia d’Alger
(Algeria)	MF	Abdelkader Saâdi	24 February 1948 (aged 22)	
(Algeria)	FW	Abderrahmane Meziani	12 May 1942 (aged 28)	(France) AS Saint Eugène
(Algeria)	FW	Kamel Tchalabi	24 April 1947 (aged 23)	(Algeria) OM Saint Eugènoise

== Competitions ==
=== Overview ===
Competition	Record								Started round	Final position / round	First match	Last match
Competition	G	W	D	L	GF	GA	GD	Win %	Started round	Final position / round	First match	Last match
National I	22	7	9	6	37	32	+5	31.82	—N/a	5th	20 September 1970	25 April 1971
Algerian Cup	7	5	1	1	15	8	+7	71.43	Round of 32	Runners–up	30 January 1971	13 June 1971
Maghreb Cup Winners Cup	2	0	0	2	1	4	−3	0.00	Semi-final	Fourth place	19 December 1970	20 December 1970
Total	31	12	10	9	53	44	+9	38.71				

=== Division Nationale ===
==== League table ====
Pos	Team	Pld	W	D	L	GF	GA	GD	Pts
3	MC Alger	22	7	10	5	28	22	+6	46
4	NA Hussein Dey	22	9	6	7	24	20	+4	46
5	USM Alger	22	7	9	6	37	32	+5	45
6	CR Belcourt	22	9	5	8	31	28	+3	45
7	JS Kabylie	22	8	6	8	30	37	−7	44

Source: rsssf.com

==== Results by round ====
Round	1	2	3	4	5	6	7	8	9	10	11	12	13	14	15	16	17	18	19	20	21	22
Ground	A	H	A	H	A	H	A	H	A	H	A	H	A	H	A	H	A	H	A	H	A	H
Result	D	D	L	W	W	D	D	D	D	L	L	L	D	W	D	W	W	L	L	W	W	D
Position																						5

Source: Competitive matches
A = Away; H = Home; W = Win; D = Draw; L = Loss

=== Matches ===
Win Draw Loss

20 September 1970 Round 1	NAA Hussein Dey	0–0	USM Alger

27 September 1970 Round 2	USM Alger	1–1	JSM Tiaret	Bologhine
	Meziani 47'		60' Ould Bachir	Stadium: Omar Hamadi Stadium

4 October 1970 Round 3	MC Oran	3–1	USM Alger	Oran
	Mehdi 5', 88'; Freha 80'		50' Tchalabi	Stadium: Ahmed Zabana Stadium

11 October 1970 Round 4	USM Alger	1–0	CS Constantine	Bologhine
				Stadium: Omar Hamadi Stadium

18 October 1970 Round 5	CSS Kouba	2–4	USM Alger	Kouba
				Stadium: Omar Benhaddad Stadium

25 October 1970 Round 6	USM Alger	2–2	MC Alger	Bologhine
	Attoui 19'; Tchalabi 54'		21', 45' Mesbah	Stadium: Omar Hamadi Stadium; Referee: Khellassi
Note: Lineup for USM Alger - Branci, Debbah, Mazouni, Mansouri, Saâdi, Abdouche, Berroudji, Allik, Attoui Ahmed, Meziani, Chalabi - Coach: Ahmed Zitoun. Lineup for MC Alger - Kaoua, Cheikh, Amrous, Zenir, Si Chaib (c), Bachta, Bachi, Amoura Mesbah, Tahir Hassen, Tahir Hamid - Coach: Smaïl Khabatou.

8 November 1970 Round 7	JS Kabylie	2–2	USM Alger	Tizi Ouzou
	Ouahabi ?'; Kouffi ?'			Stadium: Stade Oukil Ramdane

15 November 1970 Round 8	USM Alger	1–1	ES Guelma	Bologhine
	Meziani 55'			Stadium: Omar Hamadi Stadium

22 November 1970 Round 9	ES Sétif	2–2	USM Alger	Sétif
				Stadium: Stade Mohamed Guessab

29 November 1970 Round 10	USM Alger	2–4	CR Belcourt	Bologhine
	Aissaoui 18'; Meziani 27'		Kalem 8'; Messahel 40'; Lalmas 44', ?'	Stadium: Omar Hamadi Stadium

13 December 1970 Round 11	USM Bel-Abbès	1–0	USM Alger
	Kaddour 35'

3 January 1971 Round 12	USM Alger	1–2	NAA Hussein Dey	Bologhine
	Saadi		Moussouni; Ait Ouali	Stadium: Omar Hamadi Stadium

17 January 1971 Round 13	JSM Tiaret	1–1	USM Alger
	Bannus (2) 87'		Attoui 80'

24 January 1971 Round 14	USM Alger	2–1	MC Oran	Bologhine
	Attoui 19'; Aïssaoui 49'		37' Sabi	Stadium: Omar Hamadi Stadium

14 February 1971 Round 15	CS Constantine	3–3	USM Alger	Constantine
				Stadium: Stade Ben Abdelmalek

21 February 1971 Round 16	USM Alger	3–0	CSS Kouba	Bologhine
				Stadium: Omar Hamadi Stadium

28 February 1971 Round 17	MC Alger	1–2	USM Alger	Bologhine
	Zerrouk 63'		6' Meziani; 34' Tchalabi	Stadium: Omar Hamadi Stadium; Referee: Chihani
Note: Lineup for USM Alger - Zbairi, Laâla, Debbah, Belbekri, Abdouche, Saâdi, Berroudji, Allik (Mansouri 77'), Meziani, Aissaoui, Chalabi - Coach: Ahmed Zitoun. Lineup for MC Alger - Zerga, Amrous, Cheikh, Si Chaib (c), Zenir, Maloufi, Betrouni, Bachi, Tahir Hassen, Bachta, Tahir Hamid (Zerroug 55) - Coach: Smaïl Khabatou.

7 March 1971 Round 18	USM Alger	1–2	JS Kabylie	Bologhine
	? ?'		14' Kouffi ?' Djebbar	Stadium: Omar Hamadi Stadium

28 March 1971 Round 19	ES Guelma	3–2	USM Alger

4 April 1971 Round 20	USM Alger	2–1	ES Sétif	Bologhine
				Stadium: Omar Hamadi Stadium

18 April 1971 Round 21	CR Belcourt	0–4	USM Alger	Belcourt
			44', 57' Berroudji; 48' Aissaoui; 60' Meziani	Stadium: Stade El Annasser

25 April 1971 Round 22	USM Alger	0–0	USM Bel-Abbès	Bologhine
				Stadium: Omar Hamadi Stadium

=== Algerian Cup ===
30 January 1971 Round of 32	USM Alger	4–1	O.Sempac	Algiers
	Aïssaoui ?', ?', ?'; Berroudji ?'			Stadium: Stade El Annasser

21 March 1971 Round of 16	US Tébessa	0–1	USM Alger	Constantine
			Aïssaoui ?'	Stadium: Stade Ben Abdelmalek

16 May 1971 QF first leg	USM Alger	3–2	USM Oran	Bologhine
				Stadium: Stade communal de Bologhine

23 May 1971 QF second leg	USM Oran	1–3	USM Alger	Oran
				Stadium: Stade Habib Bouakeul

30 May 1971 SF first leg	USM Alger	2–0	USM Khenchela	Bologhine
				Stadium: Stade communal de Bologhine

6 June 1971 SF Second leg	USM Khenchela	2–2	USM Alger	Khenchela
14:00			Aïssaoui ?'; Allik ?'	Stadium: Stade Hamem Amar

13 June 1971 Final	MC Alger	2–0	USM Alger	Algiers
	Betrouni 5'; Bachi 36'			Stadium: Stade El Annasser; Attendance: 20,000; Referee: Mohamed Benghezal
Note: Lineup for USM Alger - Branci – Laala, Belbekri, A. Saadi, Mazouni, Ahmed Attoui (Abdouche), Berroudji, Allik, Meziani, Chalabi, Aïssaoui - Coach: Ahmed Zitoun. Lineup for MC Alger - A. Kaoua, S. Amrous, Si Chaïb, S. Mekidéche, Cheikh, Maloufi (Zerrouk), Bachta, Zenir, Bachi (Hamid Tahir), Betrouni, Hassan Tahir - Coach: Ali Benfadah.

=== Maghreb Cup Winners Cup ===
19 December 1970 Semi-final	Club africain (Tunisia)	1–0	(Algeria) USM Alger	Tunis
	Khouini 63'	Report		Stadium: Stade Chedly Zouiten; Referee: Haraf (Morocco)
Note: Lineup for USM Alger - Zebaïri, Mazouni, Debbah, Belbekri, Saadi, Abdouche (Lala), Tchalabi, Allik, Attoui, Meziani, Aissaoui (Berroudji) - Coach: Ahmed Zitoun. Lineup for Club africain - Sassi, Zitouni, Retima, Klibi, Jalloul Chaoua, Bennour, Chaïbi, Khouini, Rahmouni, Salah Chaoua (Belhassine), Bayou - Coach: ?.

20 December 1970 Third Place	Wydad Athletic Club (Morocco)	3–1	(Algeria) USM Alger	Tunis
	Bakili 26'; Aherdane 55' (pen.); Sahraoui 84'	Report	17' Tchalabi	Stadium: Stade Chedly Zouiten; Referee: Moncef Ben Ali (Tunisia)
Note: Lineup for USM Alger - Zebaïri, Mazouni, Debbah, Belbekri, Keddou, Abdouche, Tchalabi, Lala, Attoui, Allik (Meziani), Aissaoui - Coach: Ahmed Zitoun. Lineup for Wydad Athletic Club - Ouaraghli (El Khalidi), Benmoussa, Aherdane, Hamid, Abdelaziz, Zeghrari, Zahid (Sahraoui), Moujahid, Mehdi, Bakili, Bidida - Coach: ?.

== Squad information ==
=== Playing statistics ===
Only 5 games from 31

No.	Pos	Nat	Player	Total		National		Algerian Cup		Maghreb Winners Cup	
No.	Pos	Nat	Player	Apps	Goals	Apps	Goals	Apps	Goals	Apps	Goals
Goalkeepers
-	GK	(Algeria) ALG	Sid Ahmed Zebaïri	3	0	1	0	0	0	2	0
-	GK	(Algeria) ALG	Boukhalfa Branci	2	0	1	0	1	0	0	0
Defenders
-	DF	(Algeria) ALG	Rachid Debbah	4	0	2	0	0	0	2	0
-	DF	(Algeria) ALG	Mazouni	4	0	1	0	1	0	2	0
-	DF	(Algeria) ALG	Mustapha Mansouri	2	0	2	0	0	0	0	0
-	DF	(Algeria) ALG	Boubekeur Belbekri	4	0	1	0	1	0	2	0
-	DF	(Algeria) ALG	Abdelkader Saadi	4	0	2	0	1	0	1	0
-	DF	(Algeria) ALG	Rachid Lala	4	0	1	0	1	0	2	0
-	DF	(Algeria) ALG	Djamel Keddou	1	0	0	0	0	0	1	0
Midfielders
-	MF	(Algeria) ALG	Réda Abdouche	5	0	2	0	1	0	2	0
-	MF	(Algeria) ALG	Saïd Allik	5	0	2	0	1	0	2	0
-	MF	(Algeria) ALG	Ahmed Attoui	4	1	1	1	1	0	2	0
-	MF	(Algeria) ALG	Mouldi Aïssaoui	4	0	1	0	1	0	2	0
-	MF	(Algeria) ALG	Kamel Berroudji	4	0	2	0	1	0	1	0
Forwards
-	FW	(Algeria) ALG	Kamel Tchalabi	5	3	2	2	1	0	2	1
-	FW	(Algeria) ALG	Abderrahmane Meziani	5	1	2	1	1	0	2	0

Last updated: 13 June 1971
Source: Competitions

=== Goalscorers ===
Includes all competitive matches. The list is sorted alphabetically by surname when total goals are equal.

Nat.	Player	Pos.	N 1	AC	MCWC	TOTAL
(Algeria)	Kamel Tchalabi	FW	10	0	1	11
(Algeria)	Abderrahmane Meziani	FW	10	0	0	10
(Algeria)	Mouldi Aïssaoui	FW	3	5	0	8
(Algeria)	Kamel Berroudji	FW	2	1	0	3
(Algeria)	Ahmed Attoui	MF	3	0	0	3
(Algeria)	Saïd Allik	MF	0	1	0	1
(Algeria)	Abdelkader Saadi	DF	1	0	0	1
Own Goals			0	0	0	0
Totals			37	15	1	53
