= 1972 Algerian Cup final =

- Event: 1971–72 Algerian Cup
Hamra Annaba	USM Alger
2	0
- Date: June 25, 1972
- Venue: Stade du 5 Juillet, Algiers
- Referee: Zoubir Benganif

The 1972 Algerian Cup final was the 9th final of the Algerian Cup. The final took place on June 25, 1972, at Stade du 5 Juillet in Algiers. Hamra Annaba beat USM Alger 2–0 to win their first Algerian Cup.

== Route to the final ==
Hamra Annaba		Round	USM Alger	
CA Batna; 1–1 (4–2 pen.)	Ahmed Mébrek 113'	Round of 64	- -	-
ASPTT Alger; 1–0	Ahmed Mébrek 66'	Round of 32	WA Mostaganem; 2–1	-
MC Oran; 1–0 (a.e.t.)	Chérif Boulfoul 117'	Round of 16	MO Constantine; 3–2	Aissaoui ?', ?', Tchalabi ?'
SCM Oran; 2–0	Haouès 55', Mébrek 82'	Quarter-finals	USM Bel Abbès; 2–0	-
MC Alger; 2–1	Zaidi 20' (pen.), Haouès 90'	Semi-finals	NA Hussein Dey; 1–0	-

== Match ==
=== Pre-match ===
This final saw Hamra Annaba qualify for the first time to the final, either from the opposite side USM Alger reaching the final for the fourth time in a row and is looking for its first title, The new thing in this final is Stade du 5 Juillet, where it was launched by President Houari Boumédiène. As for Hamra Annaba's journey to the final, the start was against CA Batna, then against ASPTT Alger, then he faced two clubs from Oran, MC Oran and SCM Oran, to qualify for the semi-final Where faced the defending champions MC Alger and won 2–1. As for USM Alger's, the beginning was from Round of 32, against WA Mostaganem, after which he faced MO Constantine and in the Quarter-final they faced USM Bel Abbès and won 2–0, To qualify for the semi-finals and in a derby match against NA Hussein Dey where did they win with one goal.

== Match details ==
June 25, 1972

Hamra Annaba	2–0 (a.e.t.)	USM Alger
Abdelmajid Tadjet 93'; Rabah Boufermes 107'	Report

Stade du 5 Juillet, Algiers
Referee: Zoubir Benganif

GK	1	(Algeria) Farid Helaïli
	0	(Algeria) Abdelhamid Bouadila	(substituted off) 75'
DF	0	(Algeria) Ali Attoui (c)
	0	(Algeria) Salah Bounour
	0	(Algeria) Allaoua Zaïdi
	0	(Algeria) Chérif Boulfoul
	0	(Algeria) Rabah Boufermes
	0	(Algeria) Ali Bounour
	7	(Algeria) Abdelmajid Tadjet
FW	0	(Algeria) Moussa Haoués
	0	(Algeria) Mohamed Salah Bendjamaâ	(substituted off) 70'
Substitutes :
	0	(Algeria) Rachid Hadjou	(substituted in) 75'
	0	(Algeria) Hacène Benslimane	(substituted in) 70'
	0	(Algeria) Rachedi
	0	(Algeria) Boudjemaâ Bouraï
	0	(Algeria) Berkane
	0	(Algeria) Ahmed Mébrek
Manager :
(Algeria) Mohammed Boufermes

GK	1	(Algeria) Boukhalfa Branci
DF	0	(Algeria) Rachid Laâla
MF	0	(Algeria) Abdelkader Saâdi
	0	(Algeria) Brahim Aouadj
FW	0	(Algeria) Ahmed Attoui
DF	0	(Algeria) Djamel Keddou
MF	0	(Algeria) Kamel Berroudji
DF	0	(Algeria) Saïd Allik
FW	0	(Algeria) Abderrahmane Meziani	(substituted off) 67'
MF	0	(Algeria) Mouldi Aïssaoui
	0	(Algeria) Hamici	(substituted off) 56'
Substitutes :
DF	0	(Algeria) Mustapha Mansouri	(substituted in) 67'
DF	0	(Algeria) Rachid Debbah	(substituted in) 56'
Manager :
(Algeria) Ahmed Zitoun

MATCH OFFICIALS

- Assistant referees:
  - Ahmed Khelifi
  - Mohamed Benghezal
- Fourth official:

MATCH RULES

- 90 minutes.
- 30 minutes of extra-time if necessary.
- Penalty shootout if scores still level.
- Maximum of two substitutions.
