= Kamel Tchalabi =

Algerian footballer (1947–2021)

Personal information
- Full name: Kamel Tchalabi
- Date of birth: 1 April 1947
- Place of birth: Bologhine, Algeria
- Date of death: 3 May 2021 (aged 74)
- Place of death: Algiers, Algeria
- Position: Right winger

Senior career*
Years	Team	Apps	(Gls)
1963–1967	OM Saint-Eugènoise		
1968–1977	USM Alger		

International career
1969–1970	Algeria	3	(2)

Managerial career
- 1978–1979: OM Saint-Eugènoise
- 1981–1982: CR Fouka
- 1984–1985: JSM Cheraga
- * Club domestic league appearances and goals

Kamel Tchalabi (1 April 1947 – 3 May 2021) was an Algerian footballer who played as a right winger.

== Life and career ==
On June 25, 1972, in the Algerian Cup final against Hamra Annaba, Tchalabi was forced to play the military final which he played before the final, and Tchalabi promised to play one half Where did he score a goal, and after seeing that he would play the whole match, Tchalabi decided to complete the match on walk, and after the end of it he went to wear the USM Alger dress, but he was told that he was prohibited from playing the match, which affected himself.

On 3 May 2021, Tchalabi died in Ain Naâdja Hospital at the age of 74.

== International ==
Kamel Tchalabi played only three games with the national team first cap was against Palestine in a friendly match as a starter ended with a win two goals scored by Tchalabi and the last match was in 1972 African Cup of Nations qualification against Morocco it ended in victory with three goals.

== Career statistics ==
Appearances and goals by club, season and competition
Club	Season	League			Cup		Other		Total	
Club	Season	Division	Apps	Goals	Apps	Goals	Apps	Goals	Apps	Goals
USM Alger	1968–69	Nationale II								
USM Alger	1969–70	Nationale I					2 (Note: All appearance(s) in Maghreb Cup Winners Cup)	0		
USM Alger	1970–71	Nationale I					2	1		
USM Alger	1971–72	Nationale I								
USM Alger	1972–73	Nationale II								
USM Alger	1973–74	Nationale II								
USM Alger	1974–75	Nationale I								
USM Alger	1975–76	Nationale I								
USM Alger	1976–77	Nationale I								
USM Alger	Total									
Career total										

== Honours ==
- Algerian Cup runners–up: 1968-69, 1969-70, 1970-71, 1971-72, 1972-73
