= 1973 Palestine Cup of Nations =

1973 Palestine Cup
كأس فلسطين 1973
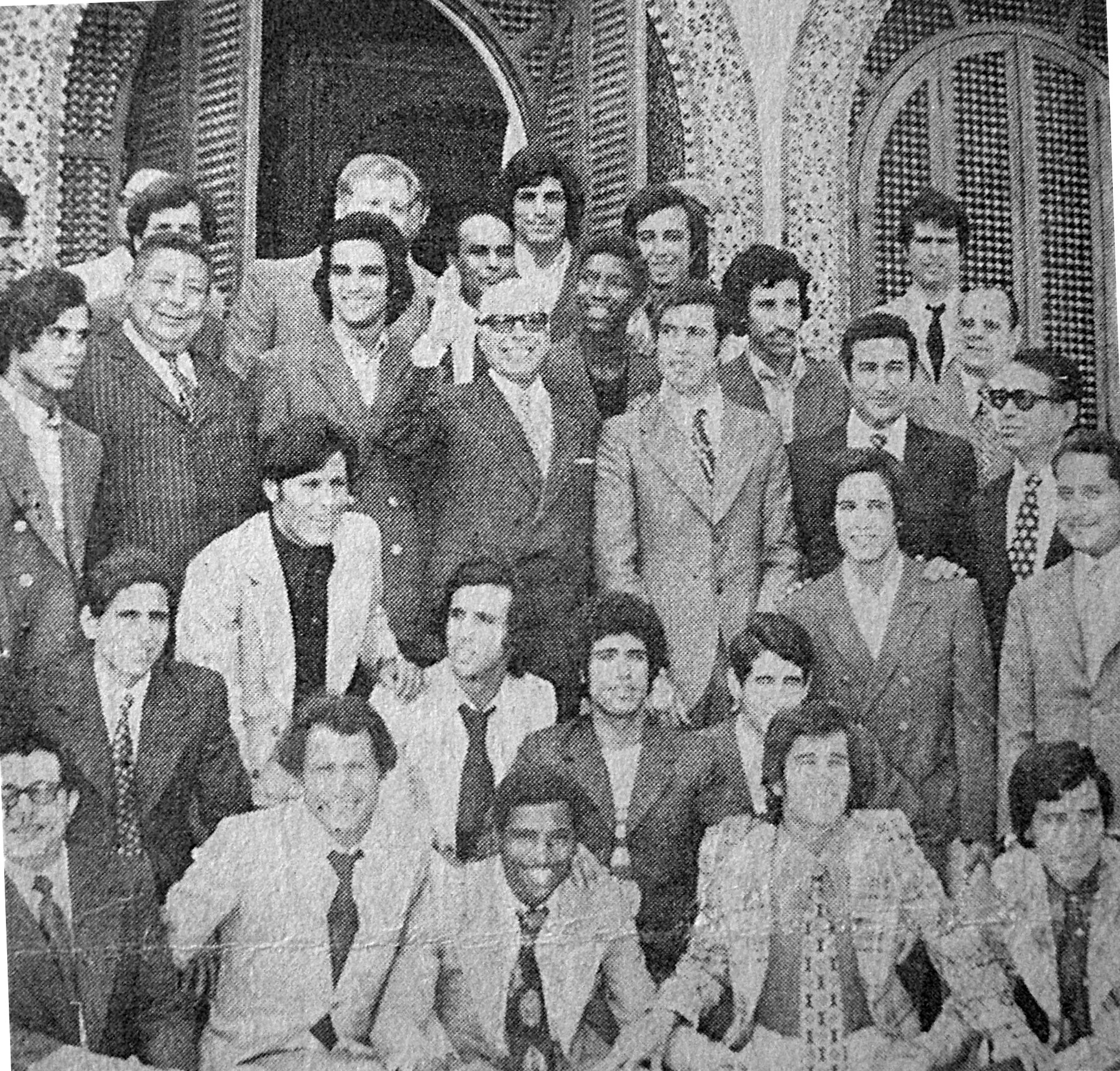
- President Habib Bourguiba honors the Tunisian national team after winning the 1973 Palestine Cup

Tournament details
- Host country: Libya
- Dates: 11–26 August
- Teams: 10
- Venue: 2 (in 2 host cities)

Final positions
- Champions: Tunisia (1st title)
- Runners-up: Syria
- Third place: Algeria
- Fourth place: Iraq

Tournament statistics
- Matches played: 24

The 1973 Palestine Cup was the 2nd edition of the Palestine Cup of Nations, it was held in Libya between 11 and 26 August. Ten nations took part in the competition of which Tunisia won.

== Participated teams ==
The 10 participated teams are:

- Algeria
- Egypt (holders)
- Iraq
- Libya (hosts)
- North Yemen
- Palestine
- South Yemen
- Syria
- Tunisia
- United Arab Emirates

== Group stage ==
=== Group A ===
Team	Pld	W	D	L	GF	GA	GD	Pts
Tunisia	4	4	0	0	13	3	+10	8
Syria	4	2	1	1	16	7	+9	5
Egypt	4	2	0	2	8	4	+4	4
Palestine	4	1	1	2	3	9	−6	3
North Yemen	4	0	0	4	2	15	−13	0

21 July 1973

Syria	1–1	Palestine
Nanu ?'		?'

11 June Stadium, Tripoli
12 August 1973

Egypt	6–1	North Yemen
Khalil ?', ?'; Abdel Azim 20', 41', 65'; El Shaikh 62'		?'

11 June Stadium, Tripoli

13 August 1973

Tunisia	4–1	Syria
Habita 44', 58', 73'; Akid 86'		Sman ?'

11 June Stadium, Tripoli
Attendance: 5.000

Palestine	beat	North Yemen

11 June Stadium, Tripoli

15 August 1973

Tunisia	1–0	Egypt
Habita 39'

11 June Stadium, Tripoli
Referee: 20.000
16 August 1973

Syria	7–1	North Yemen
Saeed ?', ?', ?'; Sman ?'; Shahrestan ?'; Tatesh ?'; Serur ?'		?'

11 June Stadium, Tripoli

16 August 1973

Egypt	2–0	Palestine
Abdel Azim 25'; El Shaikh 65'

11 June Stadium, Tripoli
19 August 1973

Tunisia	2–0	North Yemen
Chakroun 63'; Akid 66'

11 June Stadium, Tripoli
Attendance: 5.000

20 August 1973

Syria	2–0	Egypt
Shahrestan 20', 45'

11 June Stadium, Tripoli
21 August 1973

Tunisia	6–2	Palestine
Akid; Chakroun; Habita		Al-Khatib; Temime

11 June Stadium, Tripoli

=== Group B ===
Team	Pld	W	D	L	GF	GA	GD	Pts
Algeria	4	3	1	0	19	1	+18	7
Iraq	4	2	2	0	5	1	+4	6
Libya	4	1	2	1	12	4	+8	4
United Arab Emirates	4	0	2	2	3	7	−4	2
South Yemen	4	0	1	3	1	27	−26	1

11 August 1973

Libya	2–2	United Arab Emirates
Al-Aswad ?'; Sedki ?'		Rabi ?'; Suhail ?'

March 28 Stadium, Benghazi
13 August 1973

Iraq	2–0	South Yemen
Luaibi; Hanoon

March 28 Stadium, Benghazi

13 August 1973

Algeria	2–0	United Arab Emirates
Belbahri 70'; Fergani 76'

March 28 Stadium, Benghazi
14 August 1973

Libya	10–0	South Yemen

March 28 Stadium, Benghazi

15 August 1973

Algeria	0–0	Iraq

March 28 Stadium, Benghazi
16 August 1973

United Arab Emirates	draw	South Yemen

March 28 Stadium, Benghazi

17 August 1973

Algeria	15–1	South Yemen
Safsafi 1'; Akli 6', 16', 35', 55', 64', 65'; Djebbar 7', 80'; Benmessaoud 8', 53'; Fendi 10', 89'; Guedioura 51', 76'		?'

March 28 Stadium, Benghazi
18 August 1973

Libya	0–0	Iraq

March 28 Stadium, Benghazi

20 August 1973

United Arab Emirates	1–3	Iraq
Abdel Rahman ?'		Luaibi; Hassan

March 28 Stadium, Benghazi
21 August 1973

Libya	0–2	Algeria
		Ighil 35'; Belbahri 60'

March 28 Stadium, Benghazi

== Knockout stage ==
Semifinals
23 August – Tripoli
Tunisia	2
Iraq	0
23 August – Benghazi
Algeria	0 (5)
Syria (pen.)	0 (6)

Final
26 August – Tripoli
Tunisia	4
Syria	0
Third place
25 August – Tripoli
Algeria (pen.)	0 (3)
Iraq	0 (0)

=== Semifinals ===
23 August 1973

Tunisia	2–0	Iraq
Habita 7'; Chakroun 15'

11 June Stadium, Tripoli
Attendance: 5.000

23 August 1973

Algeria	0–0	Syria
Penalties
	2–3

March 28 Stadium, Benghazi

=== Third place match ===
25 August 1973

Algeria	0–0 (a.e.t.)	Iraq
Penalties
	3–0	(penalty missed) Hassan; (penalty missed) Farhan; (penalty missed) Yousif

11 June Stadium, Tripoli

=== Final ===
26 August 1973

Tunisia	4–0	Syria
Chakroun 42'; Akid 73'; Khouini 88'; Mahlami ?' (o.g.)	report

11 June Stadium, Tripoli
Attendance: 30,000

== Winners ==
1973 Palestine Cup winners

Tunisia
First title
