= 1973 Algerian Cup final =

- Stade du 5 Juillet hosted the match
- Event: 1972–73 Algerian Cup
USM Alger	MC Alger
2	4
- (after extra time)
- Date: June 19, 1973
- Venue: Stade 5 Juillet 1962, Algiers
- Man of the Match: Omar Betrouni
- Referee: Benghazal
- Attendance: 80.000

The 1973 Algerian Cup final was the 11th final of the Algerian Cup. The final took place on June 19, 1973, at Stade 5 Juillet 1962 in Algiers with kick-off at 21:00. MC Alger beat USM Alger 4–2 after extra time to win their second Algerian Cup.

== Pre-match ==
=== Details ===
June 19, 1973
20:00

USM Alger	2–4 (a.e.t)	MC Alger
Attoui 18', 120'	Report (in French)	36' Bachi; 96' Kaoua; 106' Bousri; 116' Betrouni

Stade 5 Juillet 1962, Algiers
Attendance: 80.000
Referee: Mohamed Benghezal

USM Alger	MC Alger

GK	1	(Algeria) Abdelkader Ghalem
DF	2	(Algeria) Zeribet
DF	3	(Algeria) Rachid Debah
DF	5	(Algeria) Djamel Keddou
DF	4	(Algeria) Abdelkader Saadi
FW	9	(Algeria) Ahmed Attoui
MF	7	(Algeria) Kamel Berroudji
MF	6	(Algeria) Réda Abdouche
FW	10	(Algeria) Abderrahmane Meziani (c)
MF	11	(Algeria) Mouldi Aïssaoui	(substituted off) 65'
MF	8	(Algeria) Lyès Abdi
Substitutes :
	12	(Algeria) Slimane Imalilèche	(substituted in) 65'
Manager :
(Algeria) Ahmed Zitoun

GK	1	(Algeria) Mohamed Ait Mouhoub
DF	3	(Algeria) Sadek Amrous
DF	2	(Algeria) Bouzid Mahyouz
FW	10	(Algeria) Mohamed Aizel	(substituted off) 29'
MF	11	(Algeria) Aissa Draoui	(substituted off) 37'
MF	7	(Algeria) Omar Betrouni
DF	4	(Algeria) Anwar Bachta
FW	9	(Algeria) Abdesslem Bousri
DF	5	(Algeria) Abdelwahab Zenir
MF	6	(Algeria) Maloufi
MF	8	(Algeria) Zoubir Bachi (c)
Substitutes :
MF	13	(Algeria) Mohammed Azzouz	(substituted in) 29'
GK	12	(Algeria) Abdennour Kaoua	(substituted in) 37'
Manager :
(Algeria) Smaïl Khabatou

MATCH OFFICIALS

- Assistant referees:
  - Medour
  - Lahmer
- Fourth official:

MAN OF THE MATCH

- (Algeria) Omar Betrouni (MC Alger)

MATCH RULES

- 90 minutes.
- 30 minutes of extra-time if necessary.
- Penalty shootout if scores still level.
- Seven named substitutes.
- Maximum of three substitutions.
