= Khelifa Benmessaoud =

Algerian footballer (born 1951)

Khalifa Abdelmalek Benmessaoud
Personal information
- Date of birth: 23 September 1951
- Place of birth: Tiaret, Algeria
- Position: Midfielder

Senior career*
Years	Team	Apps	(Gls)
1970–1973	JSM Tiaret	–	(–)
1973–1979	USM Alger	–	(–)
1979–1982	Stade Malherbe Caen	20	(3)

International career
1973	Algeria	5	(2)
- * Club domestic league appearances and goals

Khelifa Benmessaoud (23 September 1951) is a former professional Algerian footballer who played as a midfielder.

== Life and career ==
=== International ===
Benmessaoud played five games All of them in 1973 Palestine Cup of Nations first cap was against United Arab Emirates in group stage after that and against South Yemen he scored his only two goals, the last game was against Syria in Semifinal.
