= Mohamed Hansal =

Algerian football referee (1947–2026)

- Born: 6 November 1947; Oran, French Algeria
- Died: 8 March 2026 (aged 78)

International
Years	League	Role
1977–1991	FIFA-listed	Referee

Mohamed Hansal (Arabic: محمد حنصال; 6 November 1947 – 8 March 2026) was an Algerian football referee. He refereed one match in the 1990 FIFA World Cup in Italy.

Hansal died on the morning of 8 March 2026, at the age of 78, and was buried later the same day at the Aïn El-Beïda Cemetery in Oran.
