= Abdelghani Zitouni =

Algerian footballer (1932–2010)

Personal information
- Full name: Abdelghani Zitouni
- Date of birth: May 5, 1932
- Place of birth: Algiers, Algeria
- Date of death: November 17, 2010 (aged 78)
- Place of death: Dély Ibrahim, Algiers, Algeria
- Position: Midfielder

Senior career*
| Years | Team | Apps | (Gls) |
| | RC Kouba | - | (-) |
| | OMR El Annasser | - | (-) |
| | CR Belouizdad | - | (-) |

International career
| 1963–1965 | Algeria | 6 | (1) |

Managerial career
- USM Alger
- * Club domestic league appearances and goals

Abdelghani Zitouni (May 5, 1932 – November 17, 2010) was an Algerian international football player and manager. Zitouni scored the first ever goal in the history of the Algeria national team.

== Club career ==
Zitouni spent the majority of his playing career with OMR El Annasser, after starting off with RC Kouba. He also played briefly with MC Alger 1953–1954 CR Belouizdad.

== International career ==
On January 6, 1963, Zitouni made his debut for the Algerian National Team in a 2–1 win over Bulgaria in a friendly at the Stade 20 Août in Algiers. In that game, he scored a goal in the 72nd minute, which was also the first goal in the history of independent Algeria.

On June 17, 1965, Zitouni got his last cap for Algeria, in a 3–0 loss against Brazil in Oran.

== Managerial career ==
After his playing career, Zitouni managed a number of Algerian clubs, most notably USM Alger in the 1970s.
