= Nasreddine Akli =

Algerian footballer (born 1953)

Personal information
- Full name: Nasreddine Akli
- Date of birth: May 10, 1953 (age 73)
- Place of birth: Mouzaïa, Algeria
- Position: Forward

Youth career
- 1966–1969: USM Blida

Senior career*
Years	Team	Apps	(Gls)
1969–1977	USM Blida	-	(-)
1977–1978	USM Alger	-	(-)
1978–1981	SKAF Khemis Miliana	-	(-)
1981–1985	USM Blida	-	(-)

International career
1972–1973	Algeria	6	(6)

Managerial career
- 1985–1986: USM Blida
- 1987–1988: ESM Koléa
- 1988–1989: USM Blida
- 1989–1990: SKAF Khemis Miliana
- 1990–1991: NCB El Affroun
- 1991–1992: USMM Hadjout
- 1992–1994: WA Boufarik
- 1994–1995: USM Blida
- 1997–1998: USMM Hadjout
- –1999: ESM Boudouaou
- 1999–: USM Blida
- –2000: USMM Hadjout
- 2000–2001: E Sour El Ghozlane
- 2001–: Paradou AC
- –2002: NCB El Affroun
- 2002–: IB Mouzaia
- 2002–2003: JSM Cheraga
- 2003–2004: SKAF Khemis Miliana
- 2004–2008: ESM Koléa
- –2009: WA Boufarik
- 2009–2010: E Sour El Ghozlane
- 2010–2012: ESM Koléa
- 2012–: USM Blida
- –2013: ES Berrouaghia
- 2013–: ES Mostaganem
- –2014: SC Ain Defla
- 2014–: CR Beni Thour
- 2015–2016: CRB Boukadir
- 2017–: AS Maghnia
- 2017–2018: IB Khemis El Khechna
- –2020: ESM Koléa
- 2022–2023: IRB Laghouat
- 2024: USM Blida
- * Club domestic league appearances and goals

Nasreddine Akli (born May 10, 1953; Arabic: نصر الدين أكلي) is a former Algerian footballer and coach. He holds the Algeria national football team record for goals scored in one match, scoring six goals against South Yemen in the 1973 Palestine Cup of Nations in Libya.

Born in Mouzaia, Akli played for USM Blida, USM Alger and SKAF Khemis Miliana, and coached a number of teams including USM Blida, Paradou AC, WA Boufarik, USMM Hadjout, JSM Chéraga and ESM Koléa.

== Career statistics ==
=== International ===
Algeria
Year	Apps	Goals
1972	1	0
1973	5	6
Total	6	6

=== International goals ===
Goal	Date	Venue	Opponent	Score	Result	Competition
1	17 August 1973	March 28 Stadium, Benghazi, Libya	South Yemen	2–0	15–1	1973 Palestine Cup of Nations
2	17 August 1973	March 28 Stadium, Benghazi, Libya	South Yemen	6–0	15–1	1973 Palestine Cup of Nations
3	17 August 1973	March 28 Stadium, Benghazi, Libya	South Yemen	7–0	15–1	1973 Palestine Cup of Nations
4	17 August 1973	March 28 Stadium, Benghazi, Libya	South Yemen	10–0	15–1	1973 Palestine Cup of Nations
5	17 August 1973	March 28 Stadium, Benghazi, Libya	South Yemen	11–0	15–1	1973 Palestine Cup of Nations
6	17 August 1973	March 28 Stadium, Benghazi, Libya	South Yemen	12–0	15–1	1973 Palestine Cup of Nations
