= Abdelmalek Ali Messaoud =

Algerian footballer (1955–2022)

Personal information
- Date of birth: 27 May 1955
- Place of birth: Annaba, French Algeria, France
- Date of death: 6 February 2022 (aged 66)
- Place of death: Annaba, Algeria
- Position: Defender

Senior career*
Years	Team	Apps	(Gls)
1972–1974	HAMRA Annaba		
1974–1983	USM Alger		
1983–1987	USM Annaba		

International career
1974–1978	Algeria	38	(1)
- * Club domestic league appearances and goals

Abdelmalek Ali Messaoud (27 May 1955 – 6 February 2022) was an Algerian football player who played as a defender for USM Alger. He had 38 caps and one goal for the Algeria national team.

== International career ==
Ali Messaoud played 38 games for the Algeria national team. His first cap was against Morocco in a friendly match and the last game was against Congo, also he scored only one goal which was against Zambia in 1978 AFCON qualification at July 5, 1962 Stadium.

== Personal life and death ==
Abdelmalek Ali Messaoud died on 6 February 2022, at the age of 66 due to complications from the COVID-19 pandemic in Algeria.

== Honours ==
USM Alger

- Algerian Cup: 1980–81

Algeria

- Football at the Mediterranean Games: 1975
