= Djamel Zidane =

Algerian footballer (born 1955)

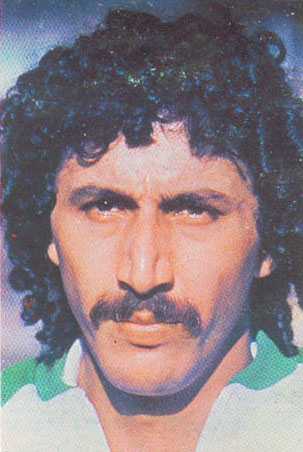
- Djamel Zidane in 1982

Personal information
- Date of birth: 28 April 1955 (age 71)
- Place of birth: Algiers, Algeria
- Height: 1.80 m (5 ft 11 in)
- Position: Forward

Youth career
- 1967–1972: USM Alger

Senior career*
| Years | Team | Apps | (Gls) |
| 1972–1976 | USM Alger | 105 | (46) |
| 1976–1977 | Corbeil-Essonnes | 11 | (4) |
| 1977–1978 | Eeklo | 26 | (11) |
| 1978–1980 | Sint-Niklase | 46 | (18) |
| 1980–1984 | Kortrijk | 116 | (34) |
| 1984–1987 | Genk | 16 | (4) |
| 1987–1990 | AC Paizay Le Sec | | |
| Total | | 320 | (117) |

International career
| 1975–1988 | Algeria | 15 | (4) |
- * Club domestic league appearances and goals

Djamel Zidane (born 28 April 1955) is an Algerian former professional footballer who played as a forward.

He appeared for the Algeria national team at the 1982 World Cup and the 1986 World Cup, in which he scored one goal, a free kick against Northern Ireland.

== Career ==
He spent nine seasons with hometown club USM Alger. Making his first steps in the B team, he had rapidly ascended to the A team, then playing in the Algerian Division 2 in 1972. He won two Algerian Juniors Cups, and helped promote the team to the 1st division in the 1973/74 season. He was crowned Algerian best player of the year, and departed to the Belgian League, where he spent seven seasons with KV Kortrijk and KSV Waterschei.

Zidane amassed 15 appearances with the Algerian national team between 1975 and 1986, 5 of them in the 1982 and 1986 World Cups. He made his international debut in a friendly against Albania, a 1–0 win, in January 1975. He did not play again for his country until 1981, when he scored his first international goal in a 2–0 defeat of Nigeria in Lagos in October 1981. He was part of Algeria's 1982 FIFA World Cup squad, the country's first appearance in the competition, which ended with an elimination after the West-Germany Austria Non-aggression pact of Gijón.

Zidane was also part of Algeria's squad for the 1986 FIFA World Cup, where he scored his only World Cup goal against Northern Ireland, a free-kick on the hour mark. Algeria's final game in that competition, a loss against Spain, was Zidane's last international appearance.

== Zidane football academy ==
In 2006 a football academy named after the champion opened in El Achour quarter "Our objective is to educate and train young players, to create an environment in which they can progress," explained academy director Farid Bahbouh.

== Personal life ==
He is not related to Zinedine Zidane.
