= Abderrahmane Derouaz =

Algerian footballer (born 1955)

Personal information
- Full name: Abderrahmane Derouaz
- Date of birth: 12 December 1955 (age 70)
- Place of birth: Algiers, Algeria
- Height: 1.80 m (5 ft 11 in)
- Position: Defender

Senior career*
| Years | Team | Apps | (Gls) |
| ? | USM Alger | ? | (?) |

International career
| 1979–1980 | Algeria Olympic | 5 | (0) |
| 1980 | Algeria | 4 | (0) |
- * Club domestic league appearances and goals

Abderrahmane Derouaz (born 12 December 1955) is a retired Algerian international footballer who played as a defender. He represented Algeria in the 1980 Summer Olympics.
