= Hocine Rabet =

Algerian footballer (born 1953)

Personal information
- Date of birth: 6 March 1953
- Place of birth: Annaba, Algeria
- Position: Midfielder

Senior career*
Years	Team	Apps	(Gls)
1972–1975	Hamra Annaba	–	(–)
1975–1983	USM Alger	–	(–)
1984–1988	USM Annaba	–	(–)

International career
1975–1976	Algeria	2	(0)
- * Club domestic league appearances and goals

Hocine Rabet (6 March 1953) was an Algerian professional footballer who played as a midfielder.

== Life and career ==
=== International ===
Rabet played only two games with the national team, against Yugoslavia in a friendly match as a substitute, and against East Germany.

== Honours ==
=== Club ===
USM Alger

- Algerian Cup (1): 1980-81

=== National team ===
- Football at the Mediterranean Games: 1975
