= 1980–81 Algerian Cup =

كأس الجزائر

Tournament details
- Country: Algeria

Final positions
- Champions: USK Alger (1)
- Runners-up: ASM Oran

The 1980–81 Algerian Cup is the 19th edition of the Algerian Cup. USK Alger defeated ASM Oran in the final, 2-1 after extra time. All three goals in the match were scored in the 95th minute or later. It was USK Alger's first time winning the cup, after losing the final seven times (1969, 1970, 1971, 1972, 1973, 1978, and 1980).

EP Sétif were the defending champions, but they lost to DNC Alger in the quarterfinals.

== Quarter-finals ==
1981	USK Alger	1 – 0	USM El Harrach	Stade 20 Août 1955, Algiers

1981	MP Oran	2 – 1	IRB Madania

1981	ASC Oran	2 – 1 (a.e.t.)	CR Belcourt

1981	DNC Alger	1 – 0	EP Sétif	Stade du 1er Novembre 1954, Tizi Ouzou

== Semi-finals ==
1981	ASC Oran	1 – 0 (a.e.t.)	DNC Alger

1981	MP Oran	1 – 2	USK Alger	Stade Akid Lotfi, Tlemcen

== Final ==
=== Match ===
June 19, 1981

USK Alger	2–1 (a.e.t.)	ASC Oran
Guedioura 95'; Djebbar 107'		Tasfaout 118' (pen.)

Stade 24 Fevrier 1956, Sidi Bel Abbes
Attendance: 50,000
Referee: Belaïd Lacarne
