= Boukhalfa Branci =

Algerian footballer (born 1952)

Personal information
- Full name: Boukhalfa Branci
- Date of birth: 18 June 1952 (age 74)
- Place of birth: Sidi Aïch, Algeria
- Position: Goalkeeper

Senior career*
Years	Team	Apps	(Gls)
1970–1976	USM Alger	–	(–)
- * Club domestic league appearances and goals

Boukhalfa Branci (born 18 June 1952) was a professional Algerian footballer who played as a goalkeeper.

== Life and career ==
On March 22, 2013, Boukhalfa Branci, former USM Alger and JSM Béjaïa goalkeeper coach, joined the staff of the Algeria A' national team. The decision was taken after lengthy debates. Everyone at the FAF and the DTN had their candidate. Mohamed Raouraoua, after studying all the applications, ended up favoring the DTN candidate Boualem Laroum. On September 22, 2023, the former goalkeeper Branci returned to USM Alger as coach of the goalkeepers for the youth groups.

== Clubs ==
- USM Alger (196?–197?)
