= Kamel Berroudji =

Algerian footballer (born 1945)

Kamel Beroudji
Personal information
- Date of birth: 9 September 1945 (age 81)
- Place of birth: Algiers, Algeria

International career
Years	Team	Apps	(Gls)
1965–1969	Algeria	13	(0)

Kamel Berroudji (born 9 September 1945) is an Algerian footballer. He played in 13 matches for the Algeria national football team from 1965 to 1969. He was also named in Algeria's squad for the 1968 African Cup of Nations tournament.
