= Nacer Guedioura =

Algerian footballer (born 1954)

Personal information
- Date of birth: 4 November 1954
- Place of birth: Algiers, Algeria
- Position: Forward

Senior career*
| Years | Team | Apps | (Gls) |
| 1971–1983 | USM Alger | – | (–) |
| 1984–1986 | La Roche-sur-Yon | 12 | (2) |
| 1986–1987 | AS Beauvais Oise | – | (–) |
| 1987–1988 | Penafiel | – | (–) |

International career
| 1973–1975 | Algeria | 2 | (2) |
- * Club domestic league appearances and goals

Nacer Guedioura (4 November 1954) is an Algerian former professional footballer who played as a forward. and had 2 caps and two goals for the Algeria national football team. He is the father of Algerian international Adlène Guedioura.

== Life and career ==
=== International ===
Guedioura played only two games with the national team first cap was against South Yemen in 1973 Palestine Cup of Nations and scored two goals the game ended a record 15–1, the Algerian team's biggest victory, the second and the last game was against Sweden.

== Honours ==
=== Club ===
USM Alger

- Algerian Cup (1): 1980-81
