= Djamel Keddou =

Algerian footballer and manager (1952-2011)

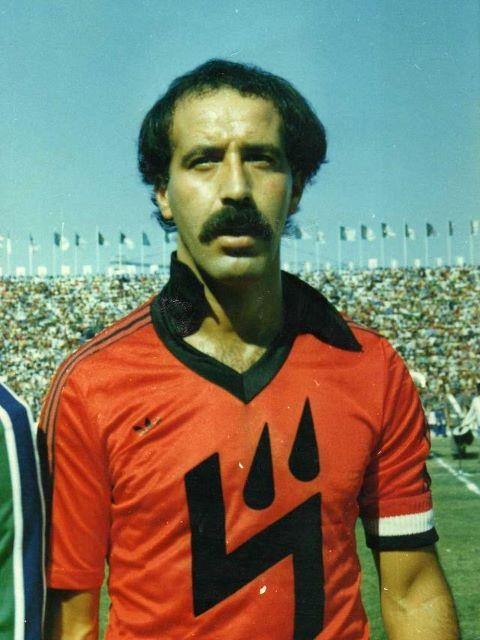

Personal information
- Full name: Djamel Keddou
- Date of birth: January 30, 1952
- Place of birth: Bab El Oued, Algiers, Algeria
- Date of death: November 16, 2011 (aged 59)
- Place of death: Algiers, Algeria
- Position: Defender

Youth career
- USM Alger

Senior career*
Years	Team	Apps	(Gls)
1972–1982	USM Alger	-	(-)

International career
1973–1978	Algeria	26	(2)

Managerial career
- 1982–1983: USM Alger
- 1987–1988: USM Alger
- JS El Biar
- WB Aïn Benian
- WA Rouiba
- JSM Chéraga
- ES Ben Aknoun
Medal record
Representing Algeria
Men's Football
Gold medal – first place	1975 Algiers	Team competition
- * Club domestic league appearances and goals

Djamel Keddou (January 30, 1952 – November 16, 2011) was an Algerian football player and manager. He spent his entire playing career with USM Alger and had 25 caps for the Algeria national football team, winning a gold medal at the 1975 Mediterranean Games in Algiers. As a manager, he led USM Alger to the Algerian Cup in 1988, beating rivals CR Belouizdad in the final. Keddou also managed Algerian clubs JS El Biar and ES Ben Aknoun.

On November 16, 2011, Keddou died after suffering a heart attack. He is buried at the El Kettar Cemetery after his death.

== Honours ==
=== Player ===
- Won the 1975 Mediterranean Games
- Won the Algerian Cup once with USM Alger in 1981

=== Manager ===
- Won the Algerian Cup once with USM Alger in 1988
