= List of leading goalscorers for USM Alger =

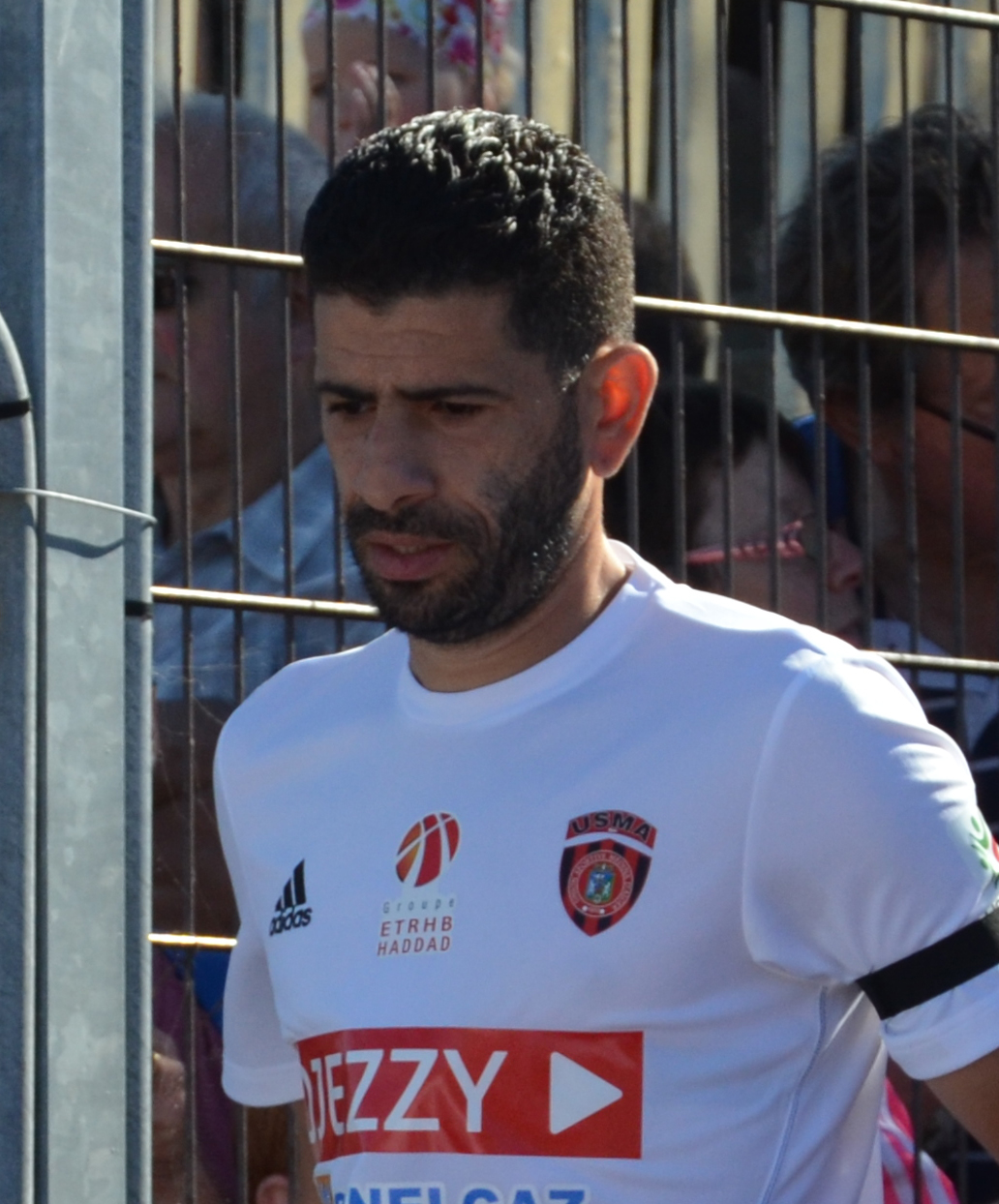
Mohamed Rabie Meftah, the most scoring defender, with 49 goals

This List of leading goalscorers for USM Alger contains football players who have played for USM Alger and is listed according to their number of goals scored. starting from 1995–96 season, Billel Dziri is the best scorer with 74 goals and at the same time he is considered the best scorer in the Ligue 1 with 51 goals and in the continental competition with 16 goals. In the Algerian Cup, Tarek Hadj Adlane is the best scorer with 11 goals; also Moncef Ouichaoui is the first player from USM Alger in the league to win best scorer in the 2002–03 season with 18 goals, and Malian Mamadou Diallo is the first who won the top scorer in the continental competition in 2004 CAF Champions League with 10 goals, 15 years after Oussama Darfalou distinguished himself by claiming the title of top scorer in the Algerian league with 18 goals in 27 games. After this success he moved to professionalism in the Netherlands with Vitesse, of the Eredivisie. On June 14, 2024, for the third time a USM player wins the top scorer title with Ismaïl Belkacemi winning for the 2023–24 season shared with Youcef Belaïli with 14 goals.

== Players ==
Entries in bold text indicates the player is still playing competitive football in USM Alger (Note: Since 1995-96 season all goals except 1995–96, 1997–98, 1999–2000 Algerian League Cup and USM Alger vs CD Travadores second leg CAF Champions League 1997 in 1996-97 season, Statistics correct as of game against MC Oran on June 6, 2026.)

Position key: GK – Goalkeeper; DF – Defender; MF – Midfielder; FW – Forward

List of USM Alger players with 10 or more goals
#	Name	Position	League	Cup	Others^{1}	Africa^{2}	Arab^{3}	Total
1	(Algeria) Billel Dziri	MF	51	3	0	16	4	74
2	(Algeria) Tarek Hadj Adlane	FW	35	11	0	14	0	60
3	(Algeria) Ismail Belkacemi	FW	44	4	1	6	0	55
4	(Algeria) Amar Ammour	MF	40	5	0	5	3	53
5	(Algeria) Mohamed Rabie Meftah	DF	38	2	1	6	2	49
6	(Algeria) Rabie Benchergui	FW	31	6	0	7	0	44
7	(Algeria) Noureddine Daham	FW	32	4	0	2	3	41
8	(Algeria) Hocine Achiou	MF	25	9	0	5	1	40
=	(Algeria) Issaad Bourahli	FW	25	5	0	9	1	40
=	(Algeria) Oussama Darfalou	FW	30	0	0	10	0	40
11	(Algeria) Aymen Mahious	FW	22	4	1	9	1	37
12	(Algeria) Moncef Ouichaoui	FW	26	3	0	5	2	36
13	(Algeria) Abderrahmane Meziane	FW	26	0	0	6	0	32
14	(Algeria) Mohamed Hamdoud	DF	18	5	0	4	1	28
15	(Algeria) Farouk Chafaï	DF	13	2	1	7	1	24
16	(Algeria) Abdelkrim Zouari	MF	21	0	0	1	0	22
=	(Algeria) Cheikh Hamidi	FW	21	1	0	0	0	22
=	(Algeria) Lamouri Djediat	MF	15	3	0	0	4	22
19	(Algeria) Mohamed Seguer	FW	16	0	0	4	0	20
=	(Madagascar) Carolus Andriamatsinoro	FW	14	2	1	3	0	20
21	(Mali) Mintou Doucoure	FW	7	4	0	5	3	19
22	(Algeria) Karim Ghazi	MF	14	2	0	2	0	18
=	(Algeria) **Ahmed Khaldi**	FW	8	4	0	4	0	18
=	(Mali) Mamadou Diallo	FW	6	2	0	10	0	18
25	(Algeria) Hocine Metref	MF	14	2	0	1	0	17
=	(Algeria) **Houssam Ghacha**	FW	8	5	0	4	0	17
=	(Algeria) Farid Djahnine	MF	10	5	0	2	0	17
28	(Algeria) Moulay Haddou	DF	15	0	0	1	0	16
=	(Algeria) Nacer Zekri	FW	11	1	0	4	0	16
=	(Algeria) Mokhtar Benmoussa	DF	13	1	0	1	1	16
31	(Algeria) Ahmed Gasmi	FW	14	0	0	0	1	15
=	(Algeria) Azzedine Rahim	FW	14	1	0	0	0	15
=	(Algeria) Zineddine Belaïd	DF	7	3	0	5	0	15
=	(Algeria) Hamza Koudri	MF	14	0	0	1	0	15
35	(Nigeria) Michael Eneramo	FW	13	0	0	1	0	14
=	(Algeria) Tarek Ghoul	DF	7	5	0	2	0	14
37	(Algeria) Hamid Aït Belkacem	FW	11	2	0	0	0	13
=	(Mali) Abdoulaye Kanou	FW	5	4	0	4	0	13
=	(Algeria) Nouri Ouznadji	FW	13	0	0	0	0	13
=	(Algeria) Youcef Belaïli	MF	9	0	0	4	0	13
=	(Algeria) Athmane Samir Amirat	MF	11	1	0	1	0	13
42	(Algeria) Rachid Nadji	FW	10	2	0	0	0	12
=	(Algeria) Billel Benhammouda	MF	11	1	0	0	0	12
=	(Algeria) Brahim Boudebouda	DF	10	2	0	0	0	12
=	(Algeria) Mohamed Boussefiane	FW	10	2	0	0	0	12
46	(Algeria) Hamza Yacef	FW	7	2	0	2	0	11
=	(Algeria) **Saâdi Radouani**	DF	4	1	0	6	0	11
=	(Algeria) **Brahim Benzaza**	MF	8	0	0	3	0	11
=	(Algeria) Adam Alilet	DF	6	1	0	4	0	11
50	(Algeria) Ali Rial	DF	9	0	0	0	1	10
=	(Republic of the Congo) Prince Ibara	FW	9	0	0	1	0	10
=	(Algeria) Bouazza Feham	MF	9	0	0	0	1	10
=	(Algeria) Mahieddine Meftah	DF	5	3	0	2	0	10
=	(Algeria) Nacereddine Khoualed	DF	8	1	0	1	0	10
=	(Algeria) Zakaria Benchaâ	FW	5	0	0	5	0	10

^{1} ^{Includes the Super Cup and League Cup.}
^{2} ^{Includes the Cup Winners' Cup, CAF Cup, Confederation Cup and Champions League.}
^{3} ^{Includes the Champions League and UAFA Club Cup.}

== Top league goalscorers by season ==
Entries in bold text indicate the player won the top division with USM Alger Entries in italic text indicates that a season is in progress

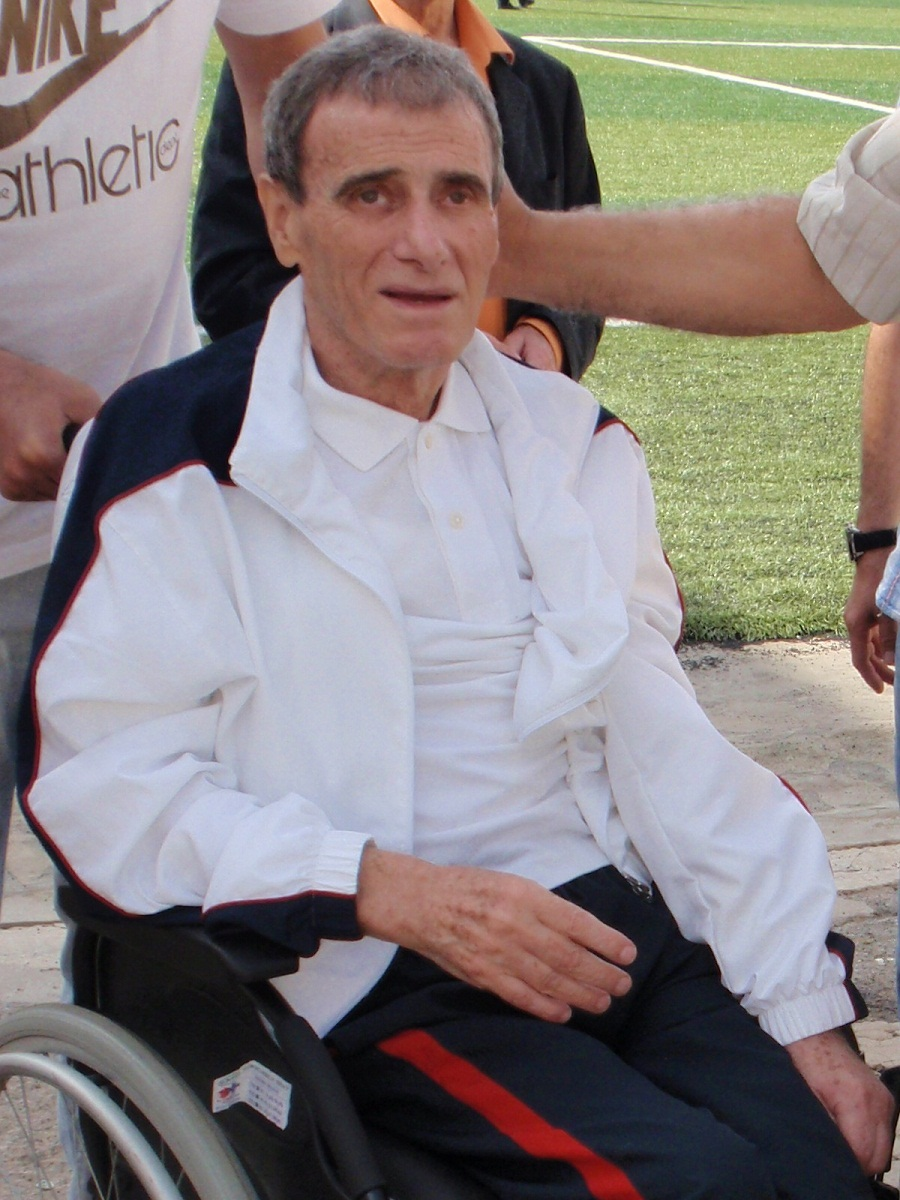
Abderrahmane Meziani was the top scorer in the season six times jointly with Tarek Hadj Adlane.

Season	Name	Division	Goals
1963–64	(Algeria) Abderrahmane Meziani	Division d'Honneur	10
1964–65	(Algeria) Abderrahmane Meziani	Division Nationale	11
1966–67	(Algeria) Abderrahmane Meziani	Nationale II	8
1967–68	(Algeria) Abderrahmane Meziani	Nationale II	7
1968–69	(Algeria) Mouldi Aïssaoui	Nationale II	9
1969–70	(Algeria) Kamel Tchalabi	Nationale I	10
1970–71	(Algeria) Abderrahmane Meziani (Algeria) Kamel Tchalabi	Nationale I	10
1971–72	(Algeria) Abderrahmane Meziani	Nationale I	8
1974–75	(Algeria) Djamel Zidane (Algeria) Nacer Guedioura	Nationale I	10
1987–88	(Algeria) Fawzi Benkhalidi	Division 1	9
1988–89	(Algeria) Tarek Hadj Adlane	Division 1	7
1989–90	(Algeria) Tarek Hadj Adlane	Division 1	10
1990–91	(Algeria) Tarek Hadj Adlane	Division 2	10
1995–96	(Algeria) Azzedine Rahim	Division 1	11
1996–97	(Algeria) Tarek Hadj Adlane	Division 1	8
1998–99	(Algeria) Tarek Hadj Adlane	Super Division	12
1999–00	(Algeria) Athmane Samir Amirat	Super Division	5
2000–01	(Algeria) Tarek Hadj Adlane	Super Division	14
2001–02	(Algeria) Rabie Benchergui	Super Division	10
**2002–03**	(Algeria) **Moncef Ouichaoui**	**Division 1**	**18**
2003–04	(Algeria) Rabie Benchergui	Division 1	13
2004–05	(Algeria) Billel Dziri	Division 1	11
2005–06	(Algeria) Moulay Haddou	Division 1	11
2006–07	(Algeria) Mohamed Boussefiane	Division 1	5
2007–08	(Algeria) Amar Ammour	Division 1	7
2008–09	(Algeria) Ali Rial	Division 1	7
2009–10	(Algeria) Cheikh Hamidi	Division 1	14
2010–11	(Algeria) Noureddine Daham	Ligue Professionnelle 1	11
2011–12	(Algeria) Lamouri Djediat	Ligue Professionnelle 1	11
2012–13	(Algeria) Ahmed Gasmi	Ligue Professionnelle 1	8
2013–14	(Algeria) Ahmed Gasmi	Ligue Professionnelle 1	6
2014–15	(Algeria) Youcef Belaïli	Ligue Professionnelle 1	6
2015–16	(Algeria) Mohamed Seguer	Ligue Professionnelle 1	9
2016–17	(Algeria) Mohamed Rabie Meftah	Ligue Professionnelle 1	9
**2017–18**	(Algeria) **Oussama Darfalou**	**Ligue Professionnelle 1**	**18**
2018–19	(Republic of the Congo) Prince Ibara	Ligue Professionnelle 1	9
2019–20	(Algeria) Abdelkrim Zouari	Ligue Professionnelle 1	7
2020–21	(Algeria) Ismail Belkacemi	Ligue Professionnelle 1	16
2021–22	(Algeria) Aymen Mahious (Algeria) Ismail Belkacemi	Ligue Professionnelle 1	8
2022–23	(Algeria) Aymen Mahious	Ligue Professionnelle 1	6
**2023–24**	(Algeria) **Ismail Belkacemi**	**Ligue Professionnelle 1**	**14**
2024–25	(Algeria) Houssam Ghacha	Ligue Professionnelle 1	6
2025–26	(Algeria) Ahmed Khaldi	Ligue Professionnelle 1	8

== List of USM Alger players hat-tricks ==
Position key: GK – Goalkeeper; DF – Defender; MF – Midfielder; FW – Forward; ^{4} – Player scored four goals; ^{5} – Player scored five goals; ^{6} – Player scored six goals; * – The home team

Player	Position	Against	Result	Time of goals	Date	League	Ref
(Algeria) Krimo Rebih	FW	USM Blida	6–3	5', ?', 60'	14 October 1962	Critériums d'Honneur	
(Algeria) Krimo Rebih^{4}	FW	JSM Alger	8–0	?', ?', ?', ?'	6 January 1963	Critériums d'Honneur	
(Algeria) Abdelaziz Ben Tifour	FW	NA Hussein Dey	6–0	35', 51', ?'	19 May 1963	Critériums d'Honneur	
(Algeria) Abderrahmane Meziani	FW	USM Blida	0–4	?', ?', ?'	27 October 1963	Division d'Honneur	
(Algeria) Abderrahmane Meziani	FW	MC Saïda	4–0	20', 67', 74'	21 February 1965	National	
(Algeria) Krimo Rebih	FW	RC Arbaâ	4–0	58', 78', 79'	5 December 1965	Division d'Honneur	
(Algeria) Mouldi Aïssaoui	MF	O.Sempac	4–1	?', ?', ?'	30 January 1971	Algerian Cup	
(Algeria) Mouldi Aïssaoui	MF	USM Annaba	3–1	?', ?', ?	1 January 1972	National I	
(Algeria) Djamel Zidane^{5}	FW	ASM Oran	11–0	4', 29', 57', 59', 86'	30 November 1975	National I	
(Algeria) Bachir Zitoune	MF	USM Bel-Abbès	8–2	49', 63', 73'	27 June 1976	National I	
(Algeria) Mustapha Amenouche^{4}	FW	USM Bel-Abbès	8–2	59', 60', 86', 89'	27 June 1976	National I	
(Algeria) Nacer Guedioura^{5}	FW	IRB Reghaïa	5–2	?', ?', ?', ?', ?'	31 March 1978	Algerian Cup	
(Algeria) Boualem Baaziz^{6}	FW	NRB Touggourt	7–2	10', 23', 24', 60', 66', 82'	12 December 1986	Division 2	
(Algeria) Tarek Hadj Adlane	FW	JSM Tiaret	5–1	52', 68', 90'	3 May 1990	Division 1	
(Algeria) Azzedine Rahim	FW	CRB Tebesbest	8–0	45'p, 60', 62'	22 April 1994	Division 2	
(Algeria) Azzedine Rahim	FW	CRB Aïn Oussera	4–0	35', 49', ?'	3 February 1995	Division 2	
(Algeria) Azzedine Rahim	FW	WA Boufarik*	4–1	4', 11', 80'	15 February 1996	Division 1	
(Algeria) Hamza Yacef	FW	IRB Hadjout*	4–0	27', 68', 90'	18 March 1999	Super Division	
(Algeria) Tarek Hadj Adlane	FW	Al-Ahli Wad Madani	5–0	10', 20', 46'	16 May 1999	CAF Cup	
(Algeria) Ammar Galoul	FW	CS Constantine	6–1	30', 44', 90+4'	25 June 2001	National 1	
(Algeria) Rabie Benchergui	FW	US Transfoot	8–2	16', 39', 60'	13 September 2002	CAF Cup Winners' Cup	
(Algeria) Issaad Bourahli	FW	CA Bordj Bou Arreridj	5–0	68', 72', 86'	12 December 2002	National 1	
(Algeria) Moncef Ouichaoui	FW	ASM Oran	4–1	21', 33'p, 41'	5 May 2003	National 1	
(Algeria) Moncef Ouichaoui	FW	MC Oran	8–2	4', 20', 45'	12 May 2003	National 1	
(Algeria) Issaad Bourahli	FW	MC Oran	3–0	5', 75', 87'	5 June 2003	Algerian Cup	
(Algeria) Ali Meçabih^{4}	FW	US Remchi	7–0	38', 52', 56', 70'	5 February 2004	Algerian Cup	
(Mali) Mamadou Diallo	FW	ASFA Yennenga	8–1	31', 62', 88'	10 April 2004	CAF Champions League	
(Nigeria) Michael Eneramo^{4}	FW	OMR El Annasser	4–1	21', 35', 39', 63'	13 June 2005	National 1	
(Algeria) Rabie Benchergui	FW	CRB Sidi Ali	6–0	23', 25', 52'	29 December 2005	Algerian Cup	
(Algeria) Cheikh Hamidi^{4}	FW	CA Batna	6–0	32', 43', 58', 65'	16 January 2010	National 1	
(Algeria) Cheikh Hamidi	FW	ASO Chlef	5–0	30', 46', 51'p	4 May 2010	National 1	
(Algeria) Noureddine Daham	FW	JSM Béjaïa	3–4	31'p, 42'p, 64'p	8 May 2012	Ligue Professionnelle 1	
(Algeria) Ahmed Gasmi	FW	WA Tlemcen*	4–0	17', 52', 64	3 November 2012	Ligue Professionnelle 1	
(Algeria) Lamouri Djediat	MF	Al-Baqa'a SC*	6–1	5', 7', 11'	12 February 2013	UAFA Club Cup	
(Algeria) Oussama Darfalou	FW	JS Saoura	5–2	23', 77', 83'	14 June 2017	Ligue Professionnelle 1	
(Algeria) Aymen Mahious	FW	USM Khenchela	6–1	8'p, 43', 67'	5 January 2020	Algerian Cup	
(Algeria) Akram Djahnit	MF	MB Rouissat	8–0	24', 41', 74'	8 March 2024	Algerian Cup	
(Algeria) Ismail Belkacemi	FW	US Souf	3–0	1', 12', 89'	11 June 2024	Ligue Professionnelle 1	
(Algeria) Mohamed Ben Mazouz	ST	Olympique Magrane	6–0	31', 71', 86'	16 January 2025	Algerian Cup	
(Algeria) Houssam Ghacha	RW	MO Constantine	3–0	19', 59', 80'	14 December 2025	Algerian Cup	

=== Multiple hat-tricks ===
Bold - still active with USM Alger

Rank	Player	Hat-tricks	Last hat-trick
1	(Algeria) Azzedine Rahim	3	15 February 1996
1	(Algeria) Krimo Rebih	3	5 December 1965
3	(Algeria) Mouldi Aïssaoui	2	1 January 1972
3	(Algeria) Tarek Hadj Adlane	2	16 May 1999
3	(Algeria) Moncef Ouichaoui	2	12 May 2003
3	(Algeria) Rabie Benchergui	2	29 December 2005
3	(Algeria) Cheikh Hamidi	2	4 May 2010
3	(Algeria) Issaad Bourahli	2	5 June 2003

== See also ==
- List of USM Alger players
