= 1995–96 USM Alger season =

USM Alger
1995–96 season
- President: Saïd Allik
- Head coach: Ahmed Aït El-Hocine (until April 1996); Mustapha Aksouh (from April 1996)
- Stadium: Omar Hamadi Stadium
- Division 1: 1st
- Algerian Cup: Round of 16
- League Cup: Group stage
- Top goalscorer: League: Azzedine Rahim (11 goals); All: Azzedine Rahim (11 goals)

In the 1995–96 season, USM Alger competed in the Division 1 for the 20th time They competed in Ligue 1, the Algerian League Cup, and the Algerian Cup. In 1995–96 season Ifticen left USM Alger despite achieving the underlined goal to be replaced by Nour Benzekri, The team signed six players duo of AS Aïn M'lila the goalkeeper Laïd Belgherbi, Abdelmalek Khouni and the duo of NA Hussein Dey, Nacer Zekri and Billel Dziri also Toufik Brakni and Nabil Mehdaoui, In Algiers Derby who played in Omar Hamadi Stadium and after USM Alger scored a goal, the assistant referee was injured by smoke gases, to stop and be repeated behind closed doors in the same stadium. After that it was decided that the Algiers Derby would not be played in the future in this stadium with the presence of the fans. After a great struggle with MC Oran for the title and in the last round USM Alger won the title after its victory against CS Constantine at Stade Mohamed Hamlaoui, with a difference of only two points, it is the first in 33 years and the second in its history.

== Squad list ==
Players and squad numbers last updated on 8 January 1996.
Note: Flags indicate national team as has been defined under FIFA eligibility rules. Players may hold more than one non-FIFA nationality.

No.	Nat.	Position	Name	Date of Birth (Age)	Signed from
Goalkeepers
	(Algeria)	GK	Toufik Zemmouri		
	(Algeria)	GK	Laïd Belgherbi		(Algeria) AS Aïn M'lila
Defenders
	(Algeria)	RB	Abdenour Hamici		(Algeria)
	(Algeria)	RB	Mohamed Hamdoud	9 June 1976 (aged 19)	(Algeria) Youth system
	(Algeria)	LB	Rachid Boumrar		
	(Algeria)	DF	Abdelmalek Brakni	17 September 1973 (aged 22)	(Algeria) RC Kouba
	(Algeria)	DF	Mohamed Briki		
	(Algeria)	CB	Farouk Bouhamidi		
Midfielders
	(Algeria)	CM	Billel Dziri	21 January 1972 (aged 23)	(Algeria) NA Hussein Dey
	(Algeria)	CM	Toufik Fouial		
	(Algeria)	MF	Mehdi Khelfouni	14 February 1976 (aged 19)	
	(Algeria)	MF	Salaheddine Mehdaoui		(Algeria) USMM Hadjout
	(Algeria)	MF	Samir Sloukia		
	(Algeria)	MF	Sid Ahmed Marcel		
	(Algeria)	MF	Brahim Salhi		
	(Algeria)	MF	Hamid Aït Belkacem		
Forwards
	(Algeria)	RW	Azzedine Rahim	31 March 1972 (aged 23)	(Algeria) Youth system
	(Algeria)	RW	Nacer Zekri	3 August 1971 (aged 24)	(Algeria) NA Hussein Dey
	(Algeria)	RW	Abdelmalek Khouni	23 December 1969 (aged 26)	(Algeria) AS Aïn M'lila
	(Algeria)	RW	Fouad Smati	2 December 1975 (aged 20)	(Algeria) Youth system

== Competitions ==
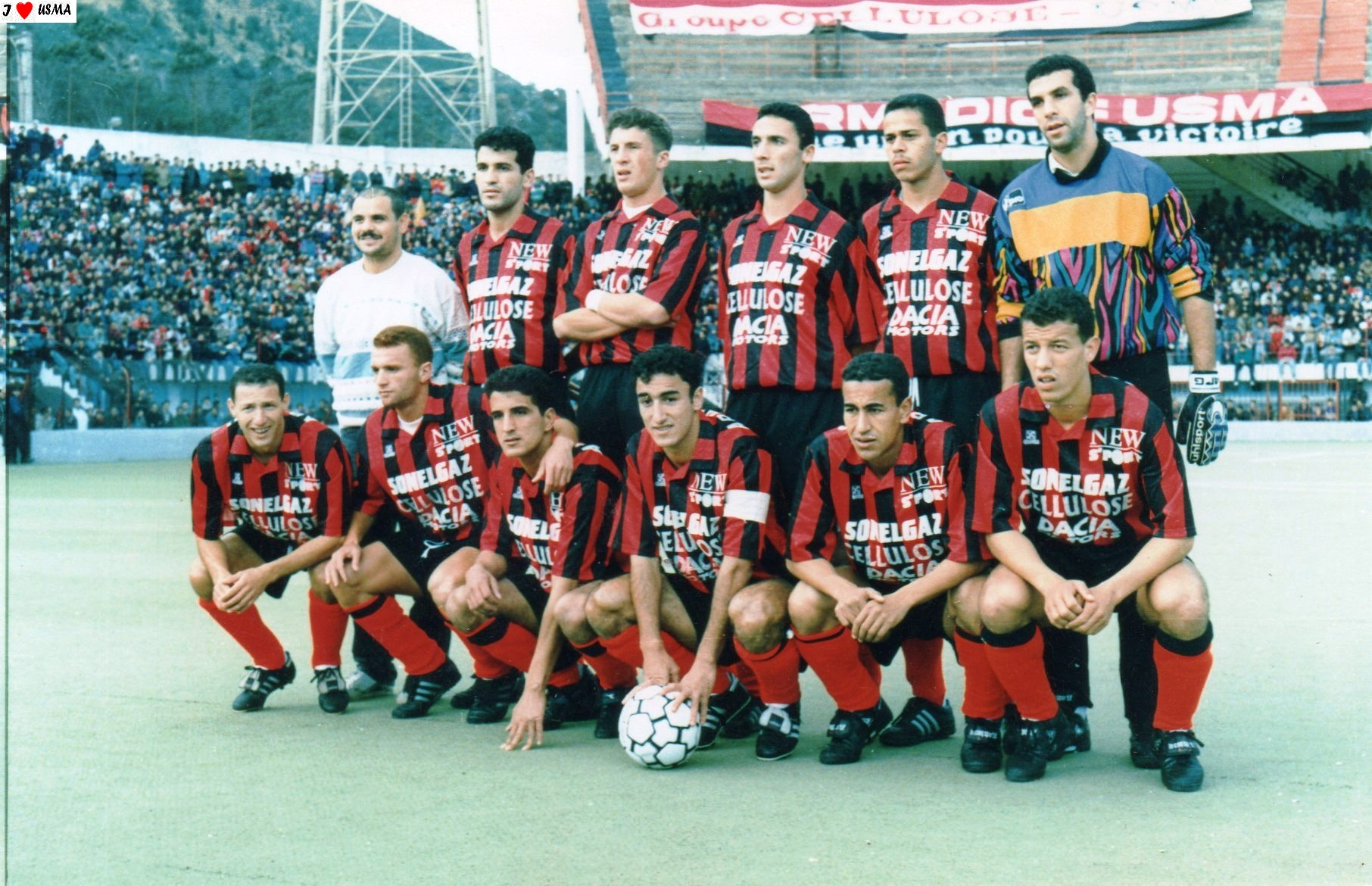
USM Alger Team Winning the league title with From Left to Right: Stand Up : Khouni - Brakni - Boumrar - Smati - Belgherbi. Sitting Dziri - Zekri - Bouhamidi - Rahim (c) - Sloukia - Hamdoud.

=== Overview ===
Competition	Record							
Competition	G	W	D	L	GF	GA	GD	Win %
Division 1	30	19	3	8	39	24	+15	63.33
Algerian Cup	2	1	0	1	2	2	+0	50.00
Algerian League Cup	6	2	2	2	3	6	−3	33.33
Total	38	22	5	11	44	32	+12	57.89

=== League table ===
Pos	Team	Pld	W	D	L	GF	GA	GD	Pts	Qualification or relegation
1	USM Alger (C)	30	19	3	8	39	24	+15	60	1997 CAF Champions League
2	MC Oran (Q)	30	17	7	6	53	21	+32	58	1997 CAF Cup
3	USM Aïn Beïda (Q)	30	15	6	9	37	31	+6	51	1997 African Cup Winners' Cup
4	WA Tlemcen (Q)	30	15	6	9	39	20	+19	51	1997 Arab Club Champions Cup
5	JS Kabylie	30	13	6	11	34	29	+5	45	

Rules for classification: 1) points; 2) goal difference; 3) number of goals scored.
(C) Champions; (Q) Qualified for the phase indicated

=== Results summary ===
Overall								Home						Away					
Pld	W	D	L	GF	GA	GD	Pts	W	D	L	GF	GA	GD	W	D	L	GF	GA	GD
30	19	3	8	39	24	+15	60	14	1	0	22	5	+17	5	2	8	17	19	−2

Last updated: 5 August 1996.
Source: Competitive matches

==== Matches ====
Win Draw Loss

14 September 1995 Round 1	USM Blida	2–1	USM Alger	Blida
14:00	Ameur Ouali 10', 35'	Report	Salhi 19'	Stadium: Brakni Brothers Stadium; Referee: Nems
Note: Lineup for USM Alger - - Coach Ahmed Aït El Hocine

21 September 1995 Round 2	USM Alger	1–0	US Chaouia	Bologhine
14:30	Dziri 5'	Report		Stadium: Omar Hamadi Stadium; Referee: Karim Dahou
Note: Lineup for USM Alger - - Coach Ahmed Aït El Hocine

28 September 1995 Round 3	ASM Oran	0–2	USM Alger	Oran
14:30		Report	Hamici 27' (pen.); Rahim 67'	Stadium: Habib Bouakeul Stadium; Referee: Lamara
Note: Lineup for USM Alger - - Coach Ahmed Aït El Hocine

5 October 1995 Round 4	JS Bordj Ménaïel	0–1	USM Alger	Reghaia
14:00		Report	Rahim 90'	Stadium: Stade Boualem Bouarada
Note: Lineup for USM Alger - - Coach Ahmed Aït El Hocine

16 October 1995 Round 5	USM Alger	1–0	AS Aïn M'lila	Bologhine
14:00	Marcel 66'	Report		Stadium: Omar Hamadi Stadium; Referee: Lazzoun
Note: Lineup for USM Alger - - Coach Ahmed Aït El Hocine

28 October 1995 Round 6	CA Batna	1–0	USM Alger	Batna
14:00	Medjbouri 6'	Report		Stadium: Mustapha Seffouhi Stadium; Referee: Belbah
Note: Lineup for USM Alger - - Coach Ahmed Aït El Hocine

18 March 1996 Round 7	USM Alger	1–0	MC Alger	Bologhine
14:00	Zekri 1' Zemmouri, Hamici, Boumrar, Brakni, Bouhamidi, Salhi (substituted off) 64' (Marcel (substituted in) 64' (substituted off) 90' , Fouial (substituted in) 90'), Sloukia, Dziri, Zekri (substituted off) 84' (Briki (substituted in) 84'), Rahim, Smati - Coach: Ahmed Aït El Hocine	Report	Lezzoum, Harkat, Zitouni, Lazizi (c), Ait Abderahmane, Allouche, Mechri, Benali, Nazef, Maza, Ait Tahar - Coach: Bencheikh Ali & Biskri Mustapha	Stadium: Omar Hamadi Stadium; Attendance: 0 (close doors); Referee: Belbordj, Hamida, Belatrèche

15 February 1996 Round 8	WA Boufarik	1–4	USM Alger	Boufarik
14:00	Hariti 47'	Report	Dziri 49'; Rahim 4', 11', 80'	Stadium: Stade Mohamed Reggaz

22 February 1996 Round 9	USM Alger	1–0	MC Oran	Bologhine
14:00	Hamid Aït Belkacem 88'			Stadium: Omar Hamadi Stadium

26 February 1996 Round 10	USM Aïn Beïda	4–2	USM Alger	Aïn Beïda
14:00	Boursas 25', 88'; Dagno 55'; Bentounsi 75'		Rahim 5', 56'	Stadium: Stade 24 avril

29 February 1996 Round 11	USM Alger	0–0	USM El Harrach	Bologhine
14:00				Stadium: Omar Hamadi Stadium

14 March 1996 Round 12	WA Tlemcen	3–1	USM Alger	Tlemcen
14:00	Djalti 3'; Brahimi 32', 44'		Zekri 40'	Stadium: Stade Akid Lotfi

25 April 1996 Round 13	USM Alger	1–0	JS Kabylie	Bologhine
14:00	Dziri 13'			Stadium: Omar Hamadi Stadium

28 March 1996 Round 14	CR Belouizdad	3–1	USM Alger	Belouizdad
14:00	Chedba 7'; Ali Moussa 32'; Meliani ?'		Fouial 83'	Stadium: August 20, 1955 Stadium

4 April 1996 Round 15	USM Alger	1–0	CS Constantine	Bologhine
14:00	Rahim 25' (pen.)			Stadium: Omar Hamadi Stadium

11 April 1996 Round 16	USM Alger	4–2	USM Blida	Bologhine
14:00	Rahim 3' (pen.), 71'; Brakni 53'; Zekri 55'		Hakim Zane 38' (pen.), 79'	Stadium: Omar Hamadi Stadium

18 April 1996 Round 17	US Chaouia	1–0	USM Alger	Oum El Bouaghi
14:00	?'			Stadium: Stade Hassouna Zerdani

2 May 1996 Round 18	USM Alger	2–1	ASM Oran	Bologhine
14:00	Rahim 25' (pen.); Mehdaoui 38'		?'	Stadium: Omar Hamadi Stadium

6 May 1996 Round 19	USM Alger	1–0	JS Bordj Ménaïel	Bologhine
14:00	Zekri 14'			Stadium: Omar Hamadi Stadium

13 May 1996 Round 20	AS Aïn M'lila	0–0	USM Alger	Aïn M'lila
14:00				Stadium: Stade des Frères Demane Debih

20 May 1996 Round 21	USM Alger	1–0	CA Batna	Bologhine
14:00	Khaouni 35'			Stadium: Omar Hamadi Stadium

20 June 1996 Round 22	MC Alger	1–0	USM Alger	Algiers
14:00	Aït Tahar 54' Lezzoum, Khiat Sofiane (Zitouni 58'), Benaissi, Fatahine, Lazizi (c), Sellou, Ait Tahar, Khezrouni, Tebbal, Benali, Mechri - Coach: Bencheikh Ali & Biskri Mustapha		Zemmouri, Hamici, Boumrar, Hamdoud, Brakni, Mehdaoui, Sloukia (Smati 70'), Dziri, Zekri, Rahim (Salhi 20') - Coach: Mustapha Aksouh	Stadium: Stade du 5 Juillet; Referee: Bendada, Hafirassou, Belatrèche

1 July 1996 Round 23	USM Alger	4–1	WA Boufarik	Bologhine
14:00	Mahdaoui 8'; Zekri 28'; Dziri 85'; Hamid Aït Belkacem 90'		?'	Stadium: Omar Hamadi Stadium

8 July 1996 Round 24	MC Oran	1–0	USM Alger	Oran
14:00	Belloumi 69'			Stadium: Ahmed Zabana Stadium

11 July 1996 Round 25	USM Alger	1–0	USM Aïn Beïda	Bologhine
14:00	Hamdoud 61'			Stadium: Omar Hamadi Stadium

18 July 1996 Round 26	USM El Harrach	0–2	USM Alger	El Harrach
14:00			Dziri 61', 64'	Stadium: November 1, 1954 Stadium

25 July 1996 Round 27	USM Alger	1–0	WA Tlemcen	Bologhine
14:00	Sloukia 72'			Stadium: Omar Hamadi Stadium

29 July 1996 Round 28	JS Kabylie	1–1	USM Alger	Tizi Ouzou
14:00	Hadj Adlane ?'		Brakni ?'	Stadium: November 1, 1954 Stadium

1 August 1996 Round 29	USM Alger	2–1	CR Belouizdad	Bologhine
14:00	Mehdaoui 5'; Zekri 64' (pen.)		?'	Stadium: Omar Hamadi Stadium

5 August 1996 Round 30	CS Constantine	1–2	USM Alger	Constantine
14:00	Mouloud Kaoua 63' Dani, Ghadbane, Bernaas, Boulfelfil, Arama, Ghoula, Mouloud Kaoua, Khalaf, Zeiani, Belhatem, Laïb - Coach: ?	Report	Dziri 3', 34' (pen.) Hamiti, Boumrar, Hamdoud, Bouhmidi, Mehdaoui, Marcel, Dziri, Zekri, Sloukia (Ait Belkacim), Khouni (Youcef Zemmouri) - Coach: Ahmed Aït El Hocine and Mustapha Aksouh	Stadium: Stade Mohamed Hamlaoui; Referee: Salim Oussaci

=== Algerian Cup ===
8 March 1996 Round of 64	WA Boufarik	1–2	USM Alger	Boufarik
14:30	Abbane 32'		77' Sloukia; 85' Smatti	Stadium: Stade Mohamed-Reggaz
Note: Lineup for USM Alger - - Coach Ahmed Aït El Hocine

8 April 1996 Round of 32	MC Saida	1–0	USM Alger	Saïda
14:00				Stadium: Stade des Frères Bracci

=== Algerian League Cup ===
==== Group stage ====
Team	Pld	W	D	L	GF	GA	GD	Pts
CR Belouizdad	5	4	0	1	10	3	+7	8
USM Alger	6	2	2	2	3	5	−2	6
JS Kabylie	6	2	1	3	8	7	+1	5
WA Boufarik	5	0	3	2	3	8	−5	3

30 November 1995 first leg	USM Alger	0–0	WA Boufarik	Bologhine
14:00				Stadium: Omar Hamadi Stadium
Note: Lineup for USM Alger - - Coach Ahmed Aït El Hocine

14 December 1995 first leg	USM Alger	1–0	JS Kabylie	Bologhine
14:00	Dziri ?' (pen.)			Stadium: Omar Hamadi Stadium
Note: Lineup for USM Alger - - Coach Ahmed Aït El Hocine

21 December 1995 second leg	WA Boufarik	1–1	USM Alger	Bologhine (Note: WA Boufarik v USM Alger match initially scheduled to Reghaïa due to work at Stade Mohamed Reggaz in Boufarik will finally take place in Bologhine after the agreement of the 2 teams.)
14:00				Stadium: Omar Hamadi Stadium
Note: Lineup for USM Alger - - Coach Ahmed Aït El Hocine

28 December 1995 second leg	USM Alger	0–3	CR Belouizdad	Bologhine
14:00				Stadium: Omar Hamadi Stadium
Note: Lineup for USM Alger - - Coach Ahmed Aït El Hocine

4 January 1996 first leg	CR Belouizdad	2–0	USM Alger	Belouizdad
14:00				Stadium: August 20, 1955 Stadium
Note: Lineup for USM Alger - - Coach Ahmed Aït El Hocine

15 January 1996 second leg	JS Kabylie	0–1	USM Alger	Tizi Ouzou
14:00			Aït Belkacem ?'	Stadium: November 1, 1954 Stadium
Note: Lineup for USM Alger - - Coach Ahmed Aït El Hocine

== Squad information ==
=== Appearances and goals ===
No.	Pos	Nat	Player	Total		Division 1		Algerian Cup		League Cup	
No.	Pos	Nat	Player	Apps	Goals	Apps	Goals	Apps	Goals	Apps	Goals
	GK	(Algeria) ALG	Toufik Zemmouri	2	0	2	0	0	0	0	0
	GK	(Algeria) ALG	Redouane Hamiti	1	0	1	0	0	0	0	0
	DF	(Algeria) ALG	Mohamed Hamdoud	2	0	2	0	0	0	0	0
	DF	(Algeria) ALG	Farouk Bouhamidi	2	0	2	0	0	0	0	0
	DF	(Algeria) ALG	Abdenour Hamici	2	0	2	0	0	0	0	0
	DF	(Algeria) ALG	Rachid Boumrar	3	0	3	0	0	0	0	0
	DF	(Algeria) ALG	Abdelmalek Brakni	2	0	2	0	0	0	0	0
	DF	(Algeria) ALG	Mohamed Briki	1	0	0+1	0	0	0	0	0
	MF	(Algeria) ALG	Billel Dziri	3	2	3	2	0	0	0	0
	MF	(Algeria) ALG	Toufik Fouial	1	0	1	0	0	0	0	0
	MF	(Algeria) ALG	Salaheddine Mehdaoui	2	0	2	0	0	0	0	0
	MF	(Algeria) ALG	Samir Sloukia	3	0	3	0	0	0	0	0
	MF	(Algeria) ALG	Sid Ahmed Marcel	2	0	1+1	0	0	0	0	0
	MF	(Algeria) ALG	Hamid Aït Belkacem	1	0	0+1	0	0	0	0	0
	MF	(Algeria) ALG	Brahim Salhi	2	0	1+1	0	0	0	0	0
	MF	(Algeria) ALG	Mehdi Khelfouni	0	0	0	0	0	0	0	0
	FW	(Algeria) ALG	Azzedine Rahim	2	0	2	0	0	0	0	0
	FW	(Algeria) ALG	Nacer Zekri	3	1	3	1	0	0	0	0
	FW	(Algeria) ALG	Abdelmalek Khouni	1	0	1	0	0	0	0	0
	FW	(Algeria) ALG	Fouad Smati	2	0	1+1	0	0	0	0	0
	FW	(Algeria) ALG	Youcef Zemmouri	1	0	0+1	0	0	0	0	0
Players transferred out during the season

Source: Competitions

=== Goalscorers ===
Includes all competitive matches. The list is sorted alphabetically by surname when total goals are equal.

No.	Nat.	Player	Pos.	N 1	AC	LC	TOTAL
?	(Algeria)	Azzedine Rahim	FW	11	0	0	11
?	(Algeria)	Billel Dziri	MF	8	0	1	9
?	(Algeria)	Nacer Zekri	FW	6	0	0	6
?	(Algeria)	Salaheddine Mehdaoui		3	0	0	3
?	(Algeria)	Hamid Aït Belkacem	FW	2	0	1	3
?	(Algeria)	Mohamed Hamdoud	DF	2	0	0	2
?	(Algeria)	Samir Sloukia		1	1	0	2
?	(Algeria)	Abdelmalek Khouni		1	0	0	1
?	(Algeria)	Abdelmalek Brakni		1	0	0	1
?	(Algeria)	Toufik Fouial	MF	1	0	0	1
?	(Algeria)	Sid Ahmed Marcel	MF	1	0	0	1
?	(Algeria)	Abdenour Hamici		1	0	0	1
?	(Algeria)	Brahim Salhi	MF	1	0	0	1
?	(Algeria)	Foued Smati		0	1	0	1
Own Goals				0	0	0	0
Totals				39	2	2+1	43+1

== Transfers ==
=== In ===
Date	Pos	Player	From club	Transfer fee	Source
1995	GK	(Algeria) Belgharbi	AS Aïn M'lila	Free transfer	
1995	DF	(Algeria) Toufik Brakni	RC Kouba	Free transfer	
1995	MF	(Algeria) Billel Dziri	NA Hussein Dey	Free transfer	
1995	MF	(Algeria) Nabil Mehdaoui	USMM Hadjout	Free transfer	
1995	FW	(Algeria) Nacer Zekri	NA Hussein Dey	Free transfer	
1995	FW	(Algeria) Abdelmalek Khouni	AS Aïn M'lila	Free transfer	
