= USM Alger =

Algerian association football club

- Full name: Union Sportive de la Médina d'Alger
- Nicknames: USMA; Usmiste al Ittihad awled El Bahdja ittihad Kahraba; Soustara; Riyas Dzair
- Short name: USMA
- Founded: July 5, 1937; 89 years ago as (Union Sportive Muslmane Algérois)
- Ground: Stade du 5 Juillet
- Capacity: 64,000
- Owner: Groupe SERPORT (94.34%); Small shareholders (5.66%)
- President: Bilel Nouioua
- Manager: Lamine N'Diaye
- League: Ligue 1
- 2025–26: Ligue 1, 10th of 16
- Website: www.usma.dz
| Home colours | Away colours |

Union Sportive de la Médina d'Alger (Arabic: الإتحاد الرياضي لمدينة الجزائر); known as USM Alger or simply USMA for short, is a football club based in the inner suburbs of Algiers. The club was founded in 1937 and its colours are red and black. Their home stadium, Omar Hamadi Stadium, has a capacity of 10,000 spectators. The club is currently playing in the Algerian Ligue Professionnelle 1.

The club has one of Algeria's successful football records or simply list the achievements, as it won the Algerian Ligue Professionnelle 1 8 times, the Algerian Cup 10 times and the Algerian Super Cup 3 times. Internationally, USM Alger won the CAF Confederation Cup twice, the CAF Super Cup twice and the UAFA Club Championship once in 2013. The IFFHS ranks USMA in the 18th place of the best African teams of the decade between 2001–2010. USMA have also reached the 2015 CAF Champions League final but suffered a defeat against TP Mazembe and lost the title.

In past years, the Union Sportive Musulmane d'Alger (former name of the USMA) was the winner of the first 1962–63 Algerian Championnat National. USMA has since become the name in the postwar years since the Algerian War for independence. In one year, the club won the Algerian championship and subsequently qualified for the finals of the Algerian Cup 1969. The club now has stronger financial support after they were bought in 2010. This privatization has been accompanied by positive sporting results, as they have been solidly anchored in Ligue 1 since the arrival of the Algerian investor Ali Haddad. They won the Ligue 1 in 2014, and the club regularly qualifies for the current African cups CAF Champions League and CAF Confederation Cup, as they have won the CAF Confederation Cup twice, as well as the CAF Super cup twice.

== History ==
=== Early years ===
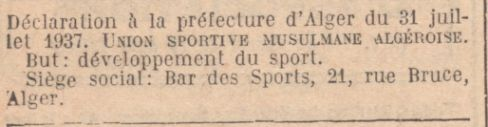
Union sportive musulmane algéroise.

In July 1935, Omar Aichoun and Mustapha Kaoui, both merchants, decided to create an exclusively Muslim sports association in which no European could play. At the time, Algeria was under French colonial rule. Algeria is one of few settler colonies in the world, meaning that their colonial power attempted to replace the native Arab Muslim population of Algeria with French Christians. The budding Algerian independence movement, spearheaded by groups such as the Algerian People's Party and later the FLN, wanted to bring the youth of Algeria together, and so sports clubs like the USMA functioned as a tool to develop a unique sense of Algerian nationalism.

In 1935, the two men gained the support of Arezki Meddad, father of a future Algerian independence fighter Ourida Meddad, which gave them access to the backing of other Algerian nationalists. They selected Ali Lahmar, known as Ali Zaid, a future independence fighter in his own right, along with Sid Ahmed Kemmat to complete the first executive committee of USM Alger, with Ali Zaid serving as president. The honorary presidency was entrusted to Omar Aichoun and Arezki Meddad.

In addition to their nationalist and sporting efforts, Omar Aichoun and Mustapha Kaoui were active members of the Nadi Ettaraki (Circle of Progress), an association established under the French 1901 Law on Associations which regulated Algerian affairs to keep colonial control. Its headquarters were located at 9 Place du Gouvernement in Algiers (now Place des Martyrs). The Circle was closely associated with the Islamic Reform Movement (El Islah), led by Sheikh Tayeb El Okbi. Notably, his son Djamel El Okbi would later become a goalkeeper for USM Alger.

Concerned that engaging in sports might conflict with Islamic principles, the founders consulted Sheikh Tayeb El Okbi, who not only reassured them but also blessed the creation of the club and offered his expressed support. For administrative formalities and to obtain the colonial authorities' approval, the founders approached the Secretary General of MC Alger, who provided them with a copy of the club statutes to serve as a model.

At that time, the Algerian youth were cut off from playing football or any other sport freely and of their own preference. Opportunities to practice were scarce, so the playing fields were the only space for creativity. The Wilaya of Algiers alone could not meet the demands of the large number of young people eager for sports activities. Early founders of USM Alger like Ahmed Kemmat, Ali Zaid, and Arezki Meddad would often use their own money to purchase balls and equipment so that these youths could continue practicing their hobbies without interference from the French Authories.

=== USM Alger and National Liberation War ===
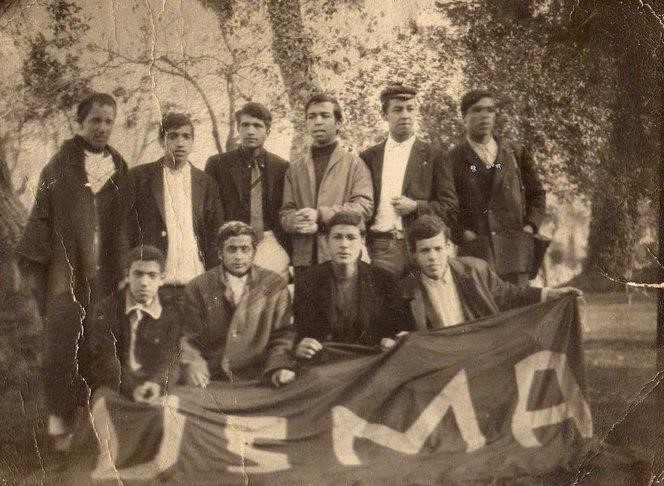
A picture of some USM Alger players during the Algerian revolution.

In the words of their founder, Ahmed Kemmat: "USMA is also a school of nationalism." At the beginning of 1955, the war for Algerian independence was in full swing, and Mr. Ali Chérifi, the club president at the time, having heard of foolish behavior committed by some young players, summoned the recruits to give them advice. He said to them:

"My children, I don't have the right to call you thugs, even if you're behaving like them, because I know you're from good families, and I know your parents. Listen carefully to what I'm about to say: our country is at war, and we need men to fight French colonialism and drive it out. If tomorrow the leaders of the FLN or the ALN contact us asking for men to join their ranks, do you know what I'd have to tell them? That I only have children here who know nothing but how to fool around. I've made a serious decision if you don't change your behavior, you will no longer play football."

In 1956, the central leadership of the National Liberation Front, or in the original French, Front de libération nationale (FLN) made the strategic decision to suspend all sporting activities of Muslim clubs as part of the national resistance effort. A pivotal meeting was held at the USM Alger circle, located on Rue de Bône, to discuss and decide on the cessation of football. This meeting was chaired by Ali Cherifi, then vice president of USMA and financial officer of the Algerian Autonomous Zone (AAZ). Two of the early leaders of the AZZ were active members of USMA, further illustrating the club's close ties to the liberation movement. Among them was Mohamed Hattab, better known as Habib Reda, a key figure in the AAZ's bomb network. Hattab, who was later sentenced to death by the colonial authorities, played basketball for USM Alger.

== After independence ==
=== Algeria's First Champion ===
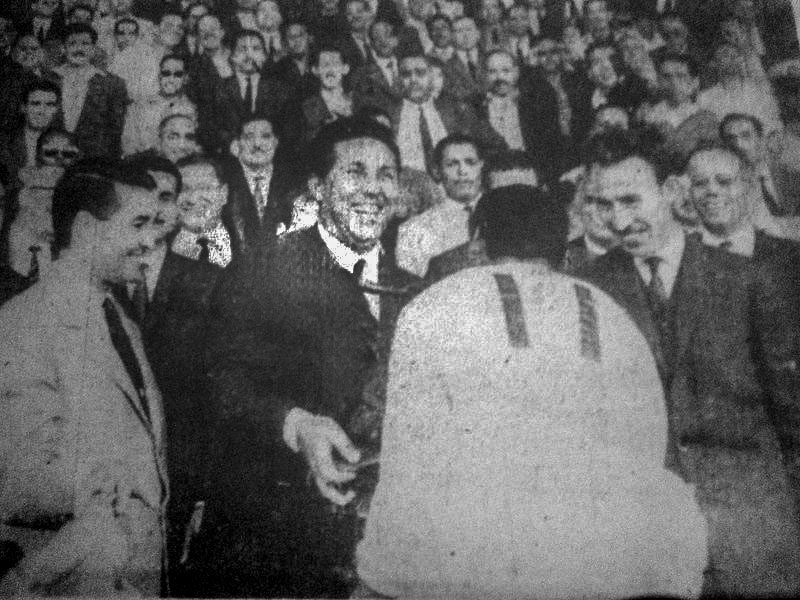
Ben Tifour, coach of the USM Alger receives from the hands of Ben Bella president, the first trophy Algerian football championship, under the gaze of president of the FAF the Dr Maouche (left) and Minister of Defense Houari Boumedienne (right).

Following Algeria's independence in 1962, national football competitions were reorganized under the guidance of the Ministry of Sports and Youth. Due to the former French administration's system, each regional league operated autonomously. Competitions were structured as regional championships, with regional champions qualifying for national playoffs to determine the Algerian champion.

In the inaugural 1962–63 season, USM Alger made history by becoming the first champions of independent Algeria. The club appointed Abdelaziz Ben Tifour, a former player for Nice and Monaco, as both coach and player. The squad notably included Freddy Zemmour, an Algerian-born player who was one of the few players of French descent that chose to remain in Algeria after independence.

USM Alger competed in Group V, finishing top with 51 points and had the highest-scoring attack of any team in the group stage with 75 goals. In the Algiers League, they were grouped with MC Alger, AS Orléansville, NA Hussein Dey, and OM Saint Eugène, and again finished first with a perfect record of 12 points out of 12. In the semi-final, they defeated Hamra Annaba (then known as USM Annaba) to reach the national final.

In the championship final, USM Alger once again faced MC Alger. The USM Alger side led by player-coach Ben Tifour, triumphed 3–0 in a match played at the Stade d'El Annasser, in the presence of President Ahmed Ben Bella and Minister of Defense Houari Boumedienne. With this victory, USM Alger became the first club to win the Algerian football championship in the post-independence era.

=== USM Alger in the Reforms Era and the First Cup Triumph ===
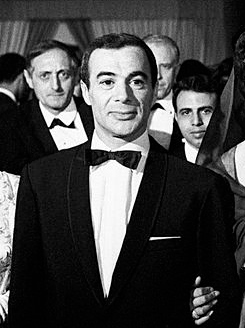
Saadi Yacef, club president from 1972 to 1975, was one of the leaders of the FLN during the country's war of independence.

Toward the end of 1974, a major sports reform initiated by the Ministry of Youth and Sports sought to provide elite clubs with a solid financial foundation, promoting a professional structure under the system known as Association Sportive de Performances (ASP). As part of this reform, many clubs changed their names based on their state sponsors. For instance, Sonatrach-sponsored clubs included MP Alger (MC Alger), MP Oran (MC Oran), and EP Sétif (ES Sétif). In line with this reform, during the 1977–78 season, USK Alger was renamed Union sportive kahraba d'Alger (Arabic: كهرباء, kahraba) meaning electricity, under the sponsorship of Sonelgaz (Société nationale de l'électricité et du gaz).

After suffering seven defeats in Algerian Cup finals, El Kahraba finally won their first Cup title in the 1980–81 season, defeating ASM Oran coached by Ali Benfadah at the newly built Stade 24 Fevrier 1956. This victory made them the first club to win the Algerian Cup while playing in the second division. Some officials and supporters of USM Alger believe that the team's previous final losses were politically influenced, blaming President Houari Boumédiène for his antagonism toward former President Ahmed Ben Bella a well known supporter of USM Alger. They note that the Cup victory came only after Boumédiène's death. In 1987, the club changed its name again to Union d'Alger, but this was short lived. Amidst a financial and economic crisis, the Algerian government abandoned the 1977 reform in 1989, and most clubs reverted to their historical identities. USM Alger thus adopted its final and current name Union sportive de la médina d'Alger (Arabic: مدينة, romanized: médina) meaning city.

On July 5, 1987, USK Alger celebrated its 50th anniversary. However, the event failed to live up to its potential as an inclusive celebration of the club's rich history. Many influential figures, from founding members like Sid Ahmed Kemmat to notable supporters like Chaabi singer Boualem Rahma, were absent. The lack of recognition for many individuals who had contributed to the club over the years left the celebration incomplete.

== Saïd Allik Era (1994–2010) ==
=== The Allik Era Begins: USM Alger's Return to Glory ===
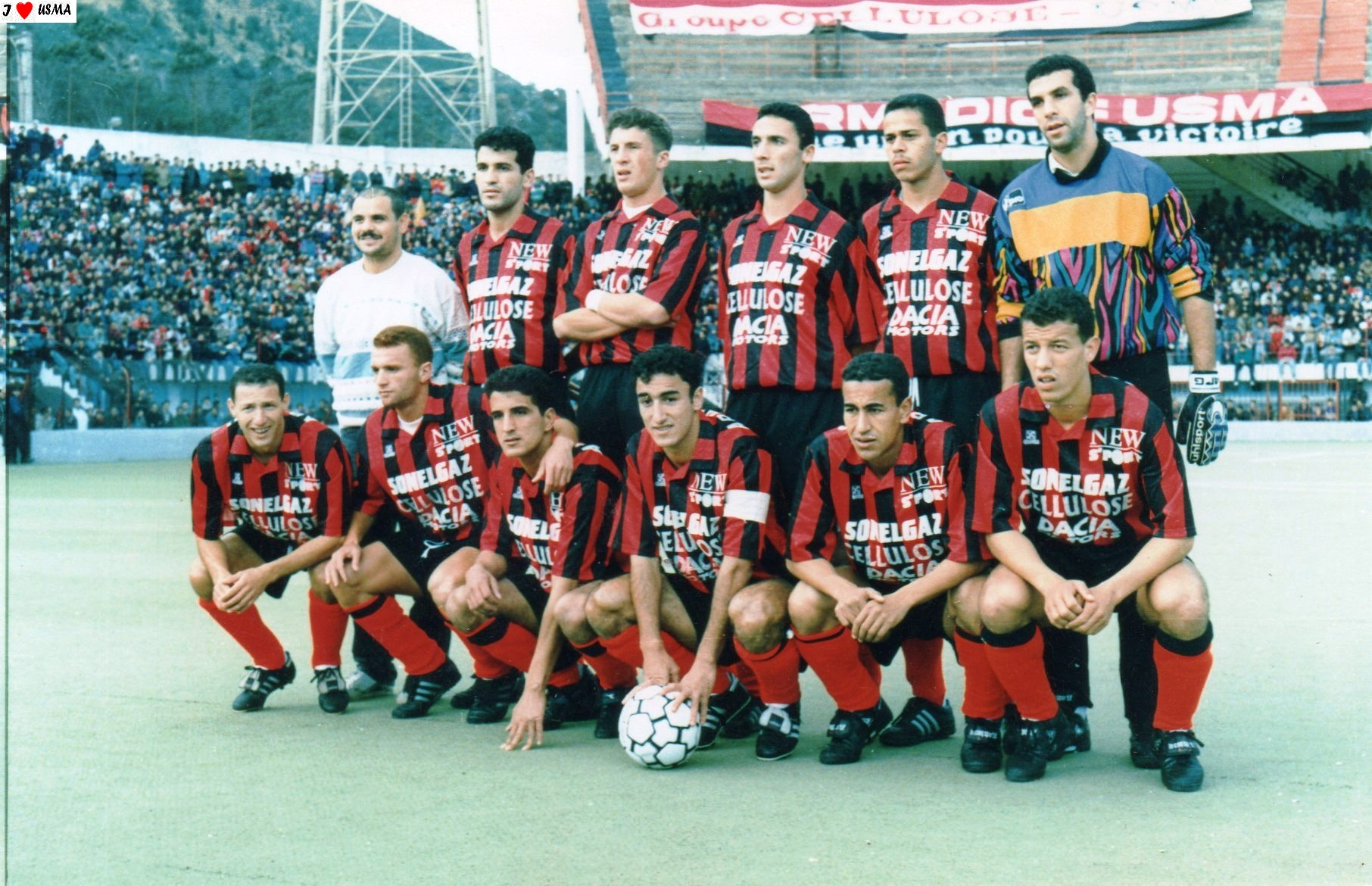
USM Alger Team Winning the league title season 1995–96.

In 1994 Saïd Allik became chairman of the board of directors of USM Alger and promised to return the team to Division 1, On May 26, 1995, USM Alger won away from home against MC Ouargla and achieved a promotion challenge back to the Division 1 after five full seasons under the leadership of Younis Ifticen, Allik announce that USM Alger has returned to its normal place and will not fall again to the second division. From 1996 to 2001, USM Alger endured a period of drought in the Algerian league, failing to win the title. The team only secured the runners-up position twice in 1998 and 2001 leaving them without major league honors during that period. However, the club excelled in the Algerian Cup, adding three more trophies during this otherwise difficult era, and five total from 1997 to 2003, solidifying their status as a cup powerhouse.

=== The first double: League and Cup ===
From 2005 to 2010, USM Alger went through its worst period under Saïd Allik. The team failed to win any titles and lost two Algerian Cup finals against fierce rivals MC Alger, their first such defeats since 1980. The club's performance in African competitions also declined, and USMA only participated in the Arab Champions League during this time. A key reason for the downturn was the aging of the squad, as most core players either retired or declined, and the club failed to rejuvenate the team. It is widely believed that Allik's political support for Ali Benflis against President Abdelaziz Bouteflika in the presidential elections also negatively impacted the club's fortunes. By the end of the 2009–10 season, club captain Billel Dziri retired at 38 years and four months, after over two decades in football, most of which were spent at USMA. His final match was against his former club NA Hussein Dey. Dziri stated that while he could have played another season or two, it was the right time to step away.

== Haddad ownership (2010–20) ==
=== Second professional era & Dream Team ===
I want to make this club the best in the country. The USMA is a great team and we will naturally have to play to win titles, that's the least. Personally, I will do my best to ensure that the club does not miss anything on a daily basis. We have many projects and we are very keen to achieve them.

— Ali Haddad a statement about his ambitions with the team.

In a joint decision by the Ligue de Football Professionnel and the Algerian Football Federation, the Algerian football championship was set to undergo professionalization starting from the 2010–11 season. As a result, all Algerian football clubs, which until then held semi-professional status, were to become fully professional that season.

Mohamed Raouraoua, president of the Algerian Football Federation, had advocated for professionalism since taking office. He emphasized a new management approach based on discipline and seriousness, especially given the decline of Algerian football in recent years. The poor performance was largely attributed to the mismanagement of clubs, which had fallen behind their counterparts in neighboring countries that had embraced professional models and made significant progress, particularly at the continental level.

A milestone in this shift came on August 4, 2010, when USM Alger became the first Algerian club to go public in line with the league's professionalization. Businessman Ali Haddad became the majority shareholder, investing 700 million Algerian dinars to acquire an 83% stake in the club. Subsequently, on October 27, 2010, Haddad replaced Saïd Allik who had served as club president for 18 years as the new president and owner of USM Alger.

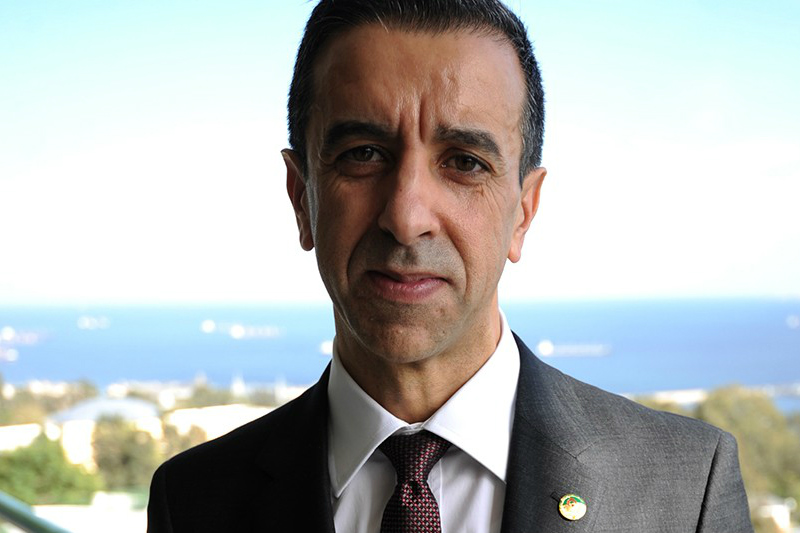
Algerian businessman Ali Haddad owner and president of club USM Alger from 2010 until 2019.

On October 20, 2019, Mounir D'bichi told France 24 that Al-Hayat Petroleum was in fact a subsidiary of ETRHB Haddad. He also disclosed that the club was in debt to the tune of 1 billion dinars (approximately €8 million). According to D'bichi, ETRHB Haddad had injected 400 billion centimes (~€23 million) into the club since its takeover. Despite the crisis, the club continued to make efforts to rebuild. On October 22, 2019, Oussama Chita returned to training after a long absence due to a serious knee injury.

On October 29, 2019, USM Alger announced the amicable termination of its sponsorship agreement with Kia Al Djazair, recovering nearly 20 billion centimes (€1.4 million) in outstanding debts. The contract with Ifri was also not renewed by company decision. On November 5, 2019, the club signed a new sponsorship deal with Groupe SERPORT, a company specializing in port services, valued at 16 billion centimes (~€1.2 million).

== Groupe SERPORT New Owner (2020–) ==
=== Groupe SERPORT's Acquisition and the Challenges Faced by USM Alger ===
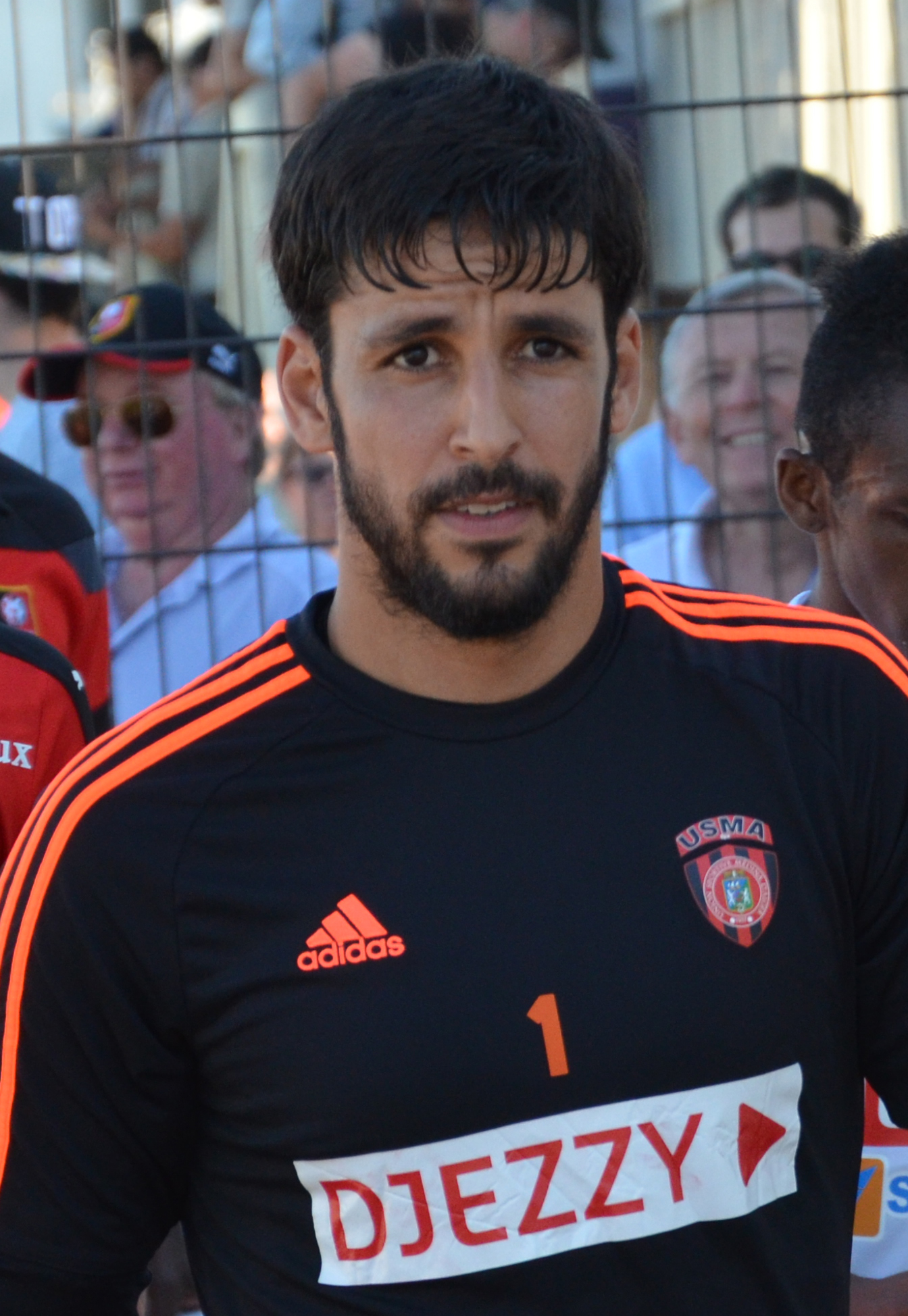
Mohamed Lamine Zemmamouche the first USM Alger player to reach the 400th match.

After initially being scheduled for March 12, 2020, the General Assembly of Shareholders was brought forward to March 2, particularly following the imprisonment of former club president Rabouh Haddad. The meeting was attended by a representative of ETRHB Haddad but notably absent was amateur club president Saïd Allik. After two and a half hours of deliberation, it was officially announced that Groupe SERPORT had acquired ETRHB Haddad's 94.34% stake in USM Alger. In a subsequent press conference, Halim Hammoudi, Secretary General of SERPORT, confirmed that the Aïn Benian project and the development of a new club headquarters would soon be underway. He emphasized that the club's ambitions now extended beyond domestic success to include continental titles. Previously, SERPORT's General Manager, Achour Djelloul, stated they intended to invest between 1.2 and 1.3 billion dinars annually, while the training center project alone would cost 1.4 billion dinars.

On July 31, Haddi addressed media reports, dismissing misinformation about the value of the club's shares acquisition. He clarified that SERPORT paid 2 billion dinars (approximately 13 million euros) for the shares. SERPORT, a state-owned holding company overseeing Algeria's port services, reportedly generates annual revenues of around 500 million euros, with net profits between 25 and 40 million euros. During an interview on Channel 3, Achour Djelloul provided insights into the dismissal of Sporting Director Antar Yahia. He emphasized that the matter was fundamentally a relationship between employer and employee. Djelloul also revealed that Yahia had been sanctioned twice by the Disciplinary Committee, leading SERPORT to end its collaboration with him. In the same interview, Djelloul announced that Denis Lavagne would become the new head coach of USM Alger.

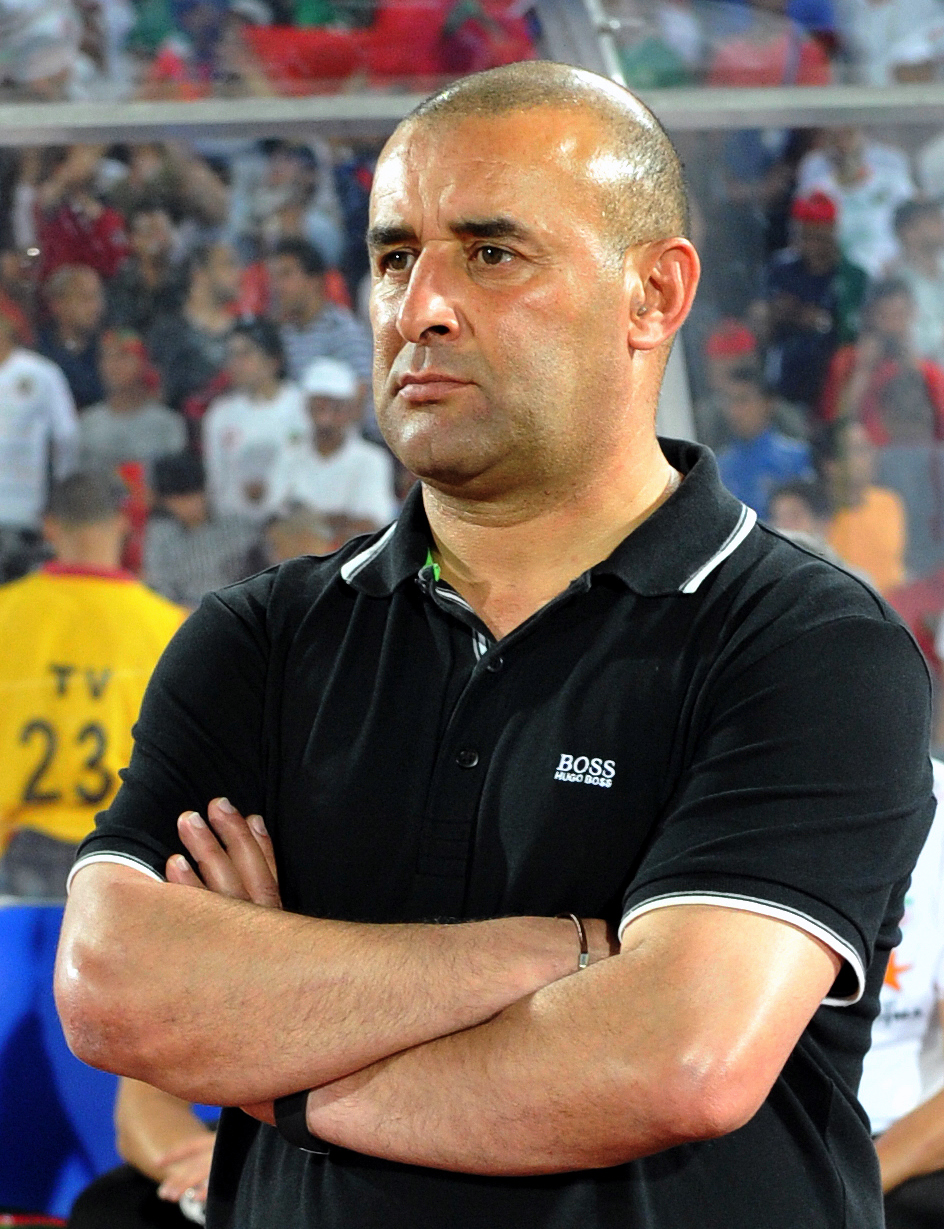
Abdelhak Benchikha leads USM Alger to win the first continental title by winning the 2022–23 CAF Confederation Cup.

On June 3, 2023, under the leadership of coach Abdelhak Benchikha, USM Alger became the first Algerian club to win the CAF Confederation Cup, marking the club's first international title despite a 1–0 home loss in the second leg of the final against Young Africans. On August 7, the club sportif amateur (CSA) filed to register a new logo with INAPI (Institut national algérien de la propriété industrielle), aiming to remove the symbol of Algiers in compliance with a court decision. Saïd Allik, president of the CSA, filed a complaint against the société sportive par actions (SSPA), accusing them of using a "fake" logo.

=== New Era Begins as Saïd Allik Returns to Take Charge ===
On April 30, 2025, the Algerian Minister of Transport Saïd Sayoud, dismissed Mohamed-Karim Eddine Harkati from his position as CEO of Groupe SERPORT, the official majority shareholder of USM Alger, and appointed Abdelkrim Rezzal as his interim replacement. USM Alger, under the guidance of Minister of Transport Saïd Sayoud and Groupe SERPORT, appointed Allik as Sporting General Manager on July 17, 2025. Allik, given full authority over recruitment, is tasked with restructuring the sporting sector and reinforcing the club with his long experience and deep knowledge. This strategic move aims to restore the club on professional foundations, ensuring efficient management and aligning with both short- and long-term objectives.

== Colours and badge ==
When USM Alger was first established, the club's founders chose light burgundy red (purplish red) and black as the official team colors. This combination was a stylistic choice in line with trends seen in several football clubs of the era, reflecting elegance and strength. However, due to the complex realities of colonial Algeria marked by political repression, material scarcity, and administrative restrictions USMA did not always play in its chosen colors. At various times, the team adopted alternative kits based on availability and circumstance.

Other color variations included: red and white, red and black, Plain red, or other temporary combinations. These adaptations were not ideological but practical driven by limited access to equipment and the financial constraints facing Muslim clubs under colonial rule. A defining moment in the club's identity came in the wake of the May 1, 1945 demonstrations in Algiers, particularly in the neighborhoods of Soustara and the Lower Casbah, where several members of the USMA community lost their lives. These protests were part of a broader wave of unrest and national resistance and preceded the infamous massacres of May 8, 1945, in which tens of thousands of Algerians were killed across the country.

In tribute to members of the club's community and others who died during the period, USM Alger officially adopted red and black as its club colours. According to the club, red symbolizes blood and sacrifice, while black represents mourning and resistance. The colours have since remained part of the club's visual identity.

== Crest ==
Old logo (2023)

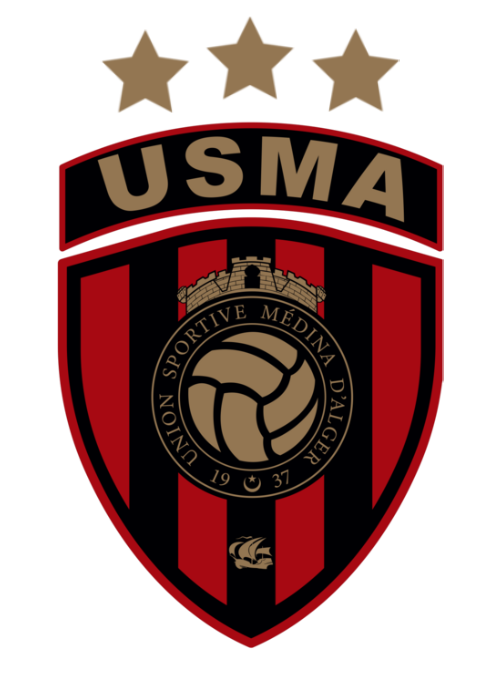
Current logo

== Shirt sponsor & kit manufacturer ==
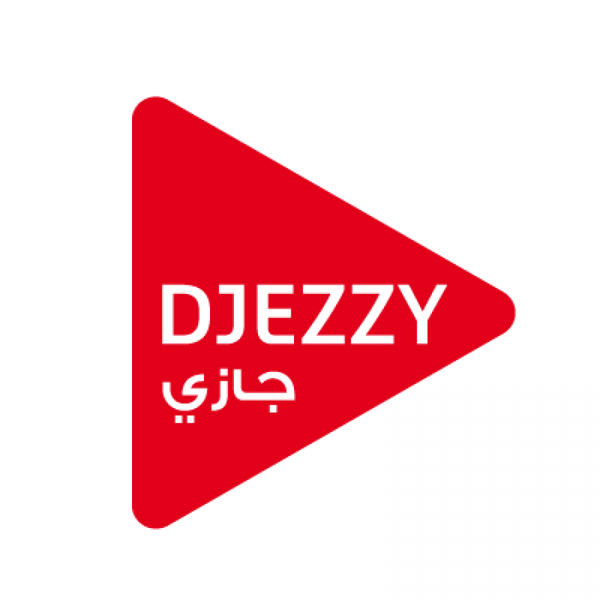
Djezzy is the club's general sponsor from 2005 Until 2019

Sonelgaz is the main sponsor USM Algiers since the sports reform of 1977, the company logo is displayed on the front of team jersey as part of the sponsorship. And until 2011, this logo was even on the emblem of the USMA. The telecommunications company Djezzy sponsors the club since 2005. On April 2, 2017, The contract was renewed for two seasons between the two sides for 100 million dinars annually. On 21 April 2019 After 14 years of funding for the team, the partnership between Djezzy and USM Alger has been formally terminated, Djezzy demanded that the management of USM Alger withdraw the logo of the mobile phone operator from the shirt of the club and the perimeter of the stadium, in confirmation of its withdrawal from funding the team. Ownership of the majority shareholder of the club, Ali Haddad, the construction company ETRHB, it is also sponsors since 2010.Other sponsors have sponsored the club in the past, such as: Canon Dekorex, Armedic ARTC Insurance, Sonatrach and Renault Trucks.

The German company Adidas, was the equipment manufacturer of the club from July 2012 to December 2016 when the USMA announced a partnership with the Spanish brand Joma. The agreement, which has lasted for three and a half years, took effect from January 2017. On April 21, 2019, USM Alger opens, its first official store, USMA Store, in El Biar, this while waiting for the opening of a megastore to Bab Ezzouar, In addition to the range supplied by Joma, the USMA's boutique offers a wide range of by-products such as scarves, mugs and t-shirts in the colors of the club, The price range is quite affordable for such products, so USMA Joma official jerseys are sold at 4,600 DA (+/- €25) while T-shirts sell for 1,600 DA. On September 8, 2020, USM Alger announced that they had signed a three-year contract with the Italian brand Kappa, It is the first Algerian club to contract with the original brand company.

=== Historical kits ===
| 1963 | 1963 | 1969–70 | 1973 | 1980–81 Cup Final | 2001 | 2003–04 Cup Final |

| 2006 | 2007 | 2011 | 2012 | 2012–2016 | Second half of the 2016–17 season | 2017/18 |

| 2018/19 | 2019/20 | 2020-2023 | 2023-2026 | 2026- |

=== Kit suppliers and shirt sponsors ===
| Period | Kit manufacturer | Shirt sponsor |
|---|---|---|
| 1970–1978 | Le Coq Sportif | — |
| 1978–1994 | Le Coq Sportif | Sonelgaz |
| 1994–1995 | Uhlsport | Sonelgaz |
| 1995–1997 | Kappa | Sonelgaz |
| 1997–1998 | Virma | Sonelgaz |
| 1998–1999 | Uhlsport | Sonelgaz |
| 1999–2001 | Puma SE | Sonelgaz |
| 2001–2005 | Uhlsport | Sonelgaz |
| 2005–2008 | Lotto | Djezzy |
| 2008–2011 | Uhlsport | Djezzy |
| 2011–2012 | Nike | ETRHB Haddad |
| 2012–2016 | Adidas | ETRHB Haddad |
| 2017–2020 | Joma | ETRHB Haddad |
| 2019– | Joma | Groupe SERPORT |
| 2020–2023 | Kappa | Groupe SERPORT |
| 2023– | Macron | Groupe SERPORT |

== Grounds ==
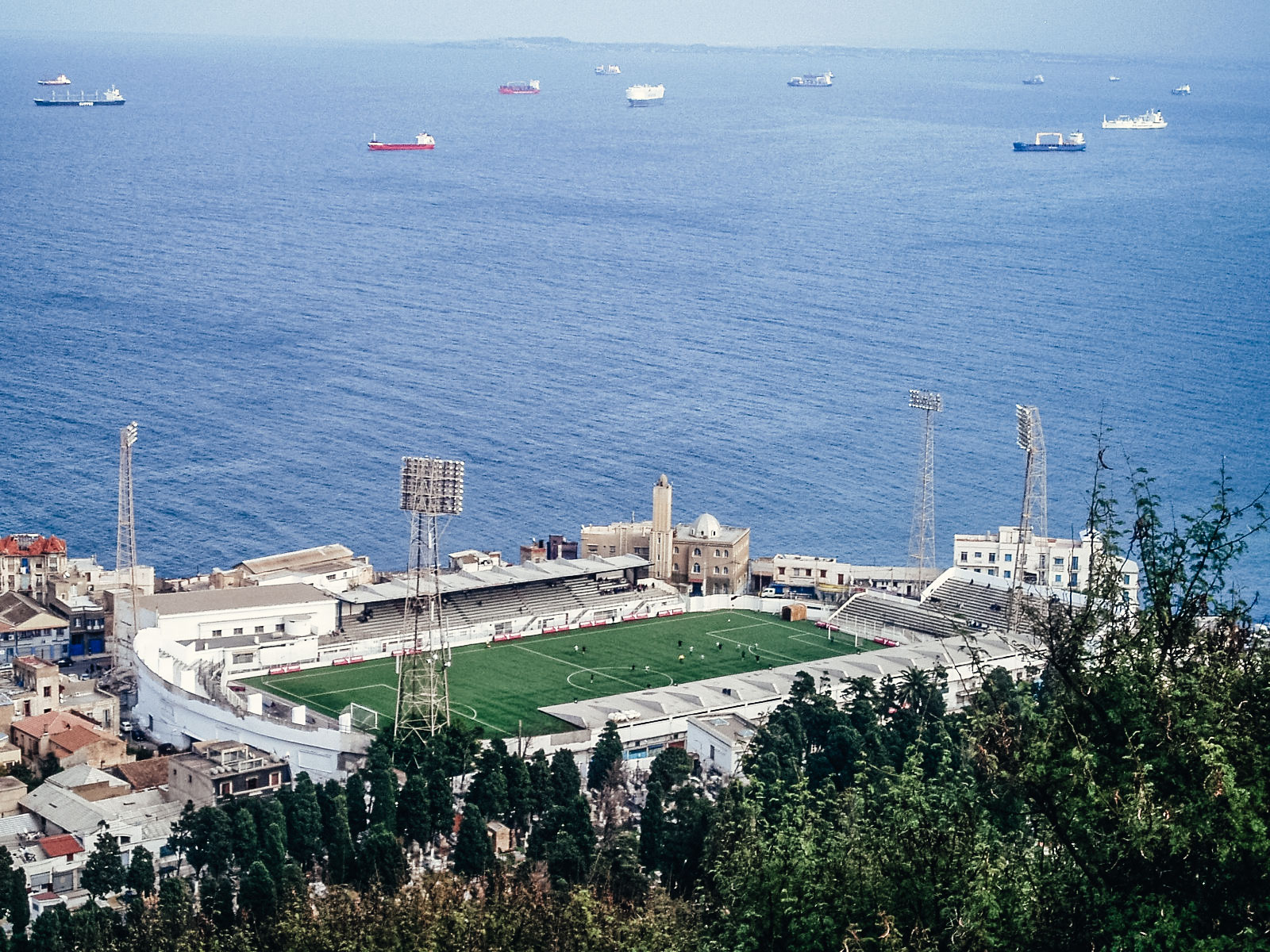
view of Omar Hamadi Stadium.

The 10,000-capacity Omar Hamadi Stadium, which was built in 1935, was the home ground of the team from its creation until 2022. They play their derbies and international games at Stade du 5 Juillet. In many times USM Alger were obliged to play in 20 August 1955 Stadium, Salem Mabrouki Stadium, Omar Benrabah Stadium and Nelson Mandela Stadium.

Since the closure of Omar Hamadi Stadium in 2022, USM Alger have been playing their domestic and international home games at Stade du 5 Juillet.

=== Training facility ===
In July 2011, the club began the construction of a training centre in Aïn Bénian, in Banlieue West of Algiers. This centre will extend over 4 hectares and will include a field in grass natural and another Artificial turf. To complete the construction of the structure, the Architect in charge of the project will be based on the plans of the Ciutat Esportiva Joan Gamper, famous training centre Barcelona. On March 15, 2021, the construction works of USM Alger's training center were officially launched, central technical director and production Rachid Douh stated that the plot contains 30,000 square meters, and will house the club's headquarters two playgrounds inside the hall two changing rooms and two playgrounds with artificial grass. The works will be carried out by EPE Batimetal.

== Supporters ==
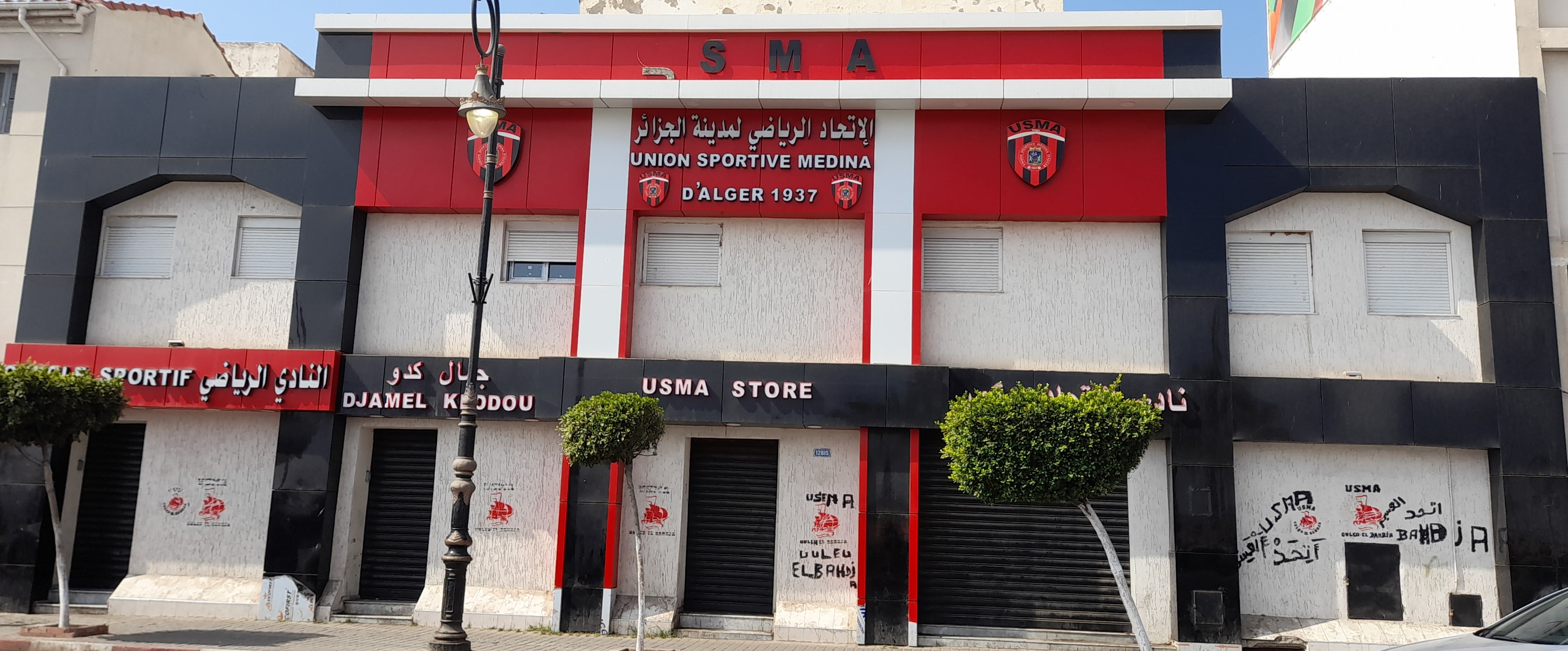
view of the Cercle of USM Alger Under the name Djamel Keddou.

Everyone knows the Algerian fans by their numbers and the way they support them and their loyalty to their teams, but when talking about supporters of USM Alger or as they are called, Almsamaah, this name was called to the bands' singing women celebrate weddings and singing. This name did not call them in a vacuum and grew to the quality of their songs and their horror, which prompted all the supporters of other Algerian clubs and even the supporters of some of the Arab nomads to quote their songs and replay The supporters of the Union were not distinguished from the rest of the other clubs' supporters, but in spite of that, they were known for their high sports spirit in accepting the loss and the style of their unique civilizational support, which made them outperform all the supporters of the other clubs

Most of the Union's supporters are based in the capital, but there are supporters of the team in all parts of Algeria and even in some neighboring countries. The district of Soutara is the main base for the supporters of the Union. From the top of the Sustara through the neighborhoods of Bab El-Oued, Bologhine and Saint-Eugène, and the capital of the Eastern and Western, Musamiya. Even in the Kabylie region, we find many supporters of the team.

The team, founded in 1937, has 3 generations of supporters. The USM Alger crowned the first tournament in the history of independent Algeria and the biggest trophy in Algeriat. They call themselves Melanesians or Rossoneri and they are already creative in the same way that the supporters of Milan.

USM Alger is known for having the best supporters in Algeria, they are particularly known for their songs, their Sportsmanship, as well as their animations in the stands. The 26 November 2011 to Stade 5 Juillet 1962, on the occasion of an Algiers derby against the MC Alger, the Usmistes supporters became the first supporters in Algeria to make a tifo large-scale. This tifo sported the inscription UNITED by the colors of the club red and black.

At the level of celebrities many popular singers chaâbi encourage USMAlger, most notably El Hadj M'Hamed El Anka The Grand Master of Andalusian classical music and Algerian chaâbi music was one of the biggest fans of the club, also helping the club through his revenues from concerts. Singers chaâbi, El Hachemi Guerouabi, was a famous supporter of the USM Alger and used to come many times to the stadium to watch his favorite team. also dedicated one of his songs to USMA. There are many popular chaâbi singers who support the club, such as Abdelkader Chaou and Mourad Djaafri who presented many songs for USMA. At the level of politicians, the most prominent fan was the first President of Algeria, Ahmed Ben Bella, who was a former player during the French colonialism. Where was a player in Olympique de Marseille, Ben Bella attended the first championship final in Algeria and the winner was USM Alger where handed him the championship cup, after the coup against him and placed him under house arrest by Houari Boumediene. Ben Bella was always asking about USM Alger, Ben Bella was the honorary president of the club until his death in 2012.

=== Ouled EL Bahdja ===
Ouled El Bahdja is a supporters' group associated with a football club in Algeria. Founded in the 1990s, the group became known for its songs, tifos, and displays at matches in the Ligue Professionnelle 1 and continental competitions. Its music has also gained attention in other North African countries, including Tunisia and Morocco.

=== Accidents ===
On July 5, 1997, in the middle of the black decade, three USMA supporters who were celebrating the Algerian Cup won by their team are murdered in a false dam at Frais Vallon.

On 21 September 2013 Died, two supporters of USM Alger attended the events of the match against MC Alger, after the collapse of part of the "Stade 5 Juillet 1962", The incident and the death of supporters Azeeb Sufyan and Saif al-Din Darhoum, and injuring several hundred others in Algiers spoiled the joy of winning the Darby supporters of the Union, The drama occurred ten minutes after the end of the match. Part of the 13th of the Stade 5 Juillet 1962 collapsed. After this incident there was a plan to destroy the whole stadium, but they retreated and decided to remove only the upper terraces and renovate them completely, the local authorities decided to close the stadium, where an investigation was opened into the incident he was also sacked director of the compound Youcef Kara after that, the funeral was attended by officials of the USM Alger led by Rabouh Haddad, who conveyed condolences to the family of the deceased and their condolences.

On September 9, 2018, And in a match between USM Alger and Al-Quwa Al-Jawiya in the Arab Club Champions Cup at Omar Hamadi Stadium and in the 70th minute withdrawal of Al-Quwa Al-Jawiya's players in protest at offensive chants from spectators. after mentioning the name of the former president Saddam Hussein and anti-Shia slogans angering Baghdad, The Iraqi ministry of foreign affairs summoned Algeria's ambassador in Baghdad over "sectarian chants" made by Algerian fans Ahmed Mahjoub, Iraq's foreign affairs spokesperson, said Baghdad had expressed "the government and the people of Iraq's indignation... at the glorification of the horrible face of Saddam Hussein's deadly dictatorial regime", which was toppled in 2003 during the United States' invasion of Iraq. later, general manager Abdelhakim Serrar said that the concerns of fans if bothered the Iraqi team, I offer my apologies. The goalkeeper and captain Mohamed Lamine Zemmamouche also apologized to the Iraqi delegation for the conduct of the supporters.

== Rivalries ==
=== MC Alger ===
The biggest rivalry is considered to be with the Mouloudia Algiers, both from the city of Algier. This rivalry has seen the two clubs contest the local dominance during the Algiers derby. This rivalry also dates back to the 1950s and resulted from a non-sports disputes during the Algerian War. In 1956, the National Liberation Front (FLN) ordered the cessation of all sports, and called to boycott competition by clubs that are related to or called "Muslim". "Mouloudia" unlike USM Alger and other Muslim clubs, refused to follow the instructions of the FLN and continued its sporting activities including football. This refusal generated several incidents to disrupt the meetings of MC Algiers, and thus, during halftime of the game between Mouloudia and AS Saint-Eugénoise at the municipal stadium of St. Eugene, violent clashes took place and forced the referee to stop the match. Following these incidents, Mohamed Tiar, then president of MCA, resigned to cease all sportive activities of the club and took the side of the FLN and other Muslim Algerian clubs.

=== CR Belouizdad ===
The fixture between CR Belouizdad and USM Alger is a local derby in Algiers, Algeria and a fierce rivalry. The derby does not have a common name. The rivalry between USM Alger and CR Belouizdad is one of the most historic and intense derbies in Algerian football. Their first meeting took place in 1962, shortly after Algeria’s independence, with USM Alger winning 5–1 in a friendly tournament. During the late 1960s and 1970s, CR Belouizdad dominated the rivalry, winning several titles and three Algerian Cup finals against USM Alger. USM Alger gradually recovered and achieved its first derby final victory in the 1988 Algerian Cup after a dramatic penalty shootout.

=== JS Kabylie ===
The matches between USM Alger and JS Kabylie are referred to as the "clasico kabylo-algérois". Both clubs are based in Algeria, with USM Alger from Algiers and JS Kabylie from Tizi Ouzou. Their matches receive coverage in the Algerian media. Between 1996 and 2010, the rivalry coincided with a period of tension between club presidents Saïd Allik and Mohand Chérif Hannachi. One reported point of contention was Allik's signing of Mahieddine Meftah, who was then a player for JS Kabylie and the national team. During this period, the two teams finished as champions and runners-up in the same season on five occasions, including three consecutive seasons from 2003–04 to 2005–06.

=== African rivalry ===
Rivalry between USM Alger and North Africa team is considered exciting. Especially Morocco and Tunisia, where he met USMA with Wydad Casablanca eight times, the first in the quarter-finals in the 1999 CAF Cup and win over Wydad 2–2 on aggregate. In 2002 African Cup Winners' Cup in the semi-finals, Wydad winning 2–2 on aggregate again. 15 years later and in the same role but in the CAF Champions League and again defeated by a total of 3–1. As for Esperance two teams met four times in all of the group stage in 2003 and 2004 three times won by Esperance and a single win for USMA was 3–0.

== Honours ==
USM Alger have won the Algerian national championship 8 times, with three Algerian Ligue 1 titles they are second only to JS Kabylie total of Fourteen (The first championship won by USM Alger was in 1963, before the professional era of Algerian football). USMA also have the record in Algerian Cup titles (with 10). USMA have achieved one Championship and Cup "Doubles" (in 2003). In 2023, USM Alger won its first continental title by lifting the Confederation Cup. The club subsequently secured two additional African trophies, winning the CAF Super Cup later that year and claiming a second Confederation Cup title in 2026.

USM Alger honours
| Type | Competition | Titles | Champions | Runners-up |
|---|---|---|---|---|
| Domestic | Ligue 1 | 8 | 1962–63, 1995–96, 2001–02, 2002–03, 2004–05, 2013–14, 2015–16, 2018–19 | 1997–98, 2000–01, 2003–04, 2005–06 |
| Domestic | Algerian Cup | 10 | 1980–81, 1987–88, 1996–97, 1998–99, 2000–01, 2002–03, 2003–04, 2012–13, 2024–25, 2025–26 | 1968–69, 1969–70, 1970–71, 1971–72, 1972–73, 1977–78, 1979–80, 2005–06, 2006–07 |
| Domestic | Algerian Super Cup | 3 | 1972, 2013, 2016 | 1981, 2014, 2019, 2025 |
| Continental | Champions League | - | - | 2015 |
| Continental | Confederation Cup | 2 | 2022–23, 2025–26 | - |
| Continental | CAF Super Cup | 2 | 2023, 2026 | - |
| Regional | UAFA Club Cup | 1 | 2012–13 | - |
| Regional | Maghreb Cup Winners Cup | - | - | 1970 |

- record
- ^{S} shared record

=== Doubles and Trebles ===
- Doubles
  - National 1 and Algerian Cup (1): 2002–03
  - CAF Confederation Cup and CAF Super Cup (1): 2022–23
- Trebles
- Algerian Cup, Algerian Super Cup and UAFA Cup (1): 2012-13
- Algerian Cup, CAF Confederation Cup and CAF Super Cup (1): 2025-26

== Performance in CAF competitions ==
USM Alger whose team has regularly taken part in Confederation of African Football (CAF) competitions. Qualification for Algerian clubs is determined by a team's performance in its domestic league and cup competitions, USM Alger have regularly qualified for the primary African competition, the African Cup, by winning the Ligue Professionnelle 1. USM Alger have also achieved African qualification via the Algerian Cup and have played in both the former African Cup Winners' Cup and the CAF Cup.

The first match was against CARA Brazzaville and ended in victory for USM Alger 2–0 As for the biggest win result was in 2004 against ASFA Yennenga 8–1, and biggest loss first defeat in 1998 against Primeiro de Agosto club, and the second in 2013 against US Bitam 3–0.

First participation in International competition were in the African Cup Winners' Cup in 1982 and the maximum in the quarter-finals against Ghanaian club Hearts of Oak, in the 1989 version of the same competition and the club withdrew from the same role after the loss in the first leg against Malagasy club BFV at Stade Omar Hammadi, after that to miss the club's continental competitions for eight years until 1997 in the CAF Champions League for the first time, and almost USM Alger advance to the final match and goal difference in favor of Raja Casablanca.

Then he became the team participated in a systematic manner in various competitions such as African Cup Winners' Cup, CAF Cup, CAF Confederation Cup and the CAF Champions League until 2007 except in 2001 where the team disqualified in 2000 of the African Cup Winners Cup to be punished not to participate in any African competition for a whole year because of the participation an ineligible goalkeeper Burkinabé Siaka Coulibaly against JS du Ténéré from Niger in the second leg, In 2003 the team to reach the semi-finals of the African Champions League at the hands of ousts champion Enyimba, and after an absence of eight years from the African Champions League USM Alger managed to reach the final in 2015 for the first time in its history, but was defeated against TP Mazembe 4–1 on aggregate.

== Players ==
Algerian teams are limited to four foreign players. The squad list includes only the principal nationality of each player;

=== Current squad ===
As of 31 August 2026 Note: Flags indicate national team as defined under FIFA eligibility rules; some limited exceptions apply. Players may hold more than one non-FIFA nationality.

| No. | Pos. | Nation | Player |
|---|---|---|---|
| 1 | GK | ALG | Abdelmoumen Sifour |
| 2 | DF | ALG | Walid Kourdi |
| 4 | DF | CMR | Che Malone |
| 5 | DF | ALG | Imadeddine Azzi |
| 6 | MF | ALG | Zakaria Draoui |
| 7 | FW | ALG | Ahmed Khaldi |
| 8 | MF | ALG | Abderaouf Benguit |
| 9 | MF | ALG | Farid Boulaya |
| 10 | MF | ALG | Dhirar Bensaadallah |
| 11 | MF | COD | Glody Likonza |
| 12 | DF | ALG | Haithem Loucif |
| 14 | MF | ALG | Salaheddine Bouziani |
| 15 | FW | ALG | Mohamed Ramdaoui |
| 16 | GK | ALG | Mohamed Idir Hadid |

| No. | Pos. | Nation | Player |
|---|---|---|---|
| 17 | MF | SEN | Aimé Tendeng |
| 18 | MF | ALG | Alaeddine Limane |
| 19 | DF | ALG | Saâdi Radouani (captain) |
| 20 | DF | ALG | Rayane Mahrouz |
| 21 | DF | ALG | Issam Bayoud |
| 22 | FW | ALG | Mohamed Gherbi |
| 23 | DF | ALG | Ilyes Chetti |
| 24 | FW | ALG | Mohamed Bouderbala |
| 26 | FW | ALG | Ghiles Guenaoui |
| 27 | FW | ALG | Houssam Ghacha |
| 28 | DF | ALG | Achref Abada |
| 29 | FW | CIV | Dramane Kamagaté |
| 30 | GK | ALG | Oussama Benbot |

=== Out on loan ===
Note: Flags indicate national team as defined under FIFA eligibility rules; some limited exceptions apply. Players may hold more than one non-FIFA nationality.

| No. | Pos. | Nation | Player |
|---|---|---|---|
| — | DF | ALG | Safieddine Atmania (at CR Témouchent until 30 June 2027) |

== Personnel ==
=== Current technical staff ===
| Position | Staff |
|---|---|
| Head coach | (Senegal) Lamine N'Diaye |
| Assistant coach | (Algeria) Khaled Lemmouchia |
| Assistant coach | (Algeria) Tarek Hadj Adlane |
| Goalkeeping coach | (Algeria) Smail Hamed |
| Fitness coach | (France) Matthieu Mansutier |
| Analyst | (Algeria) Mohamed Mokrane |

=== Management ===
| Position | Staff |
|---|---|
| President | Bilel Nouioua |
| General Director | |
| Sporting Director | |
| General Secretary | |
| Administrative Director | Hakim Boughadou |
| Financial Director | |

== Notable players ==
Had senior international cap(s) for their respective countries. Players whose name is listed in bold represented their countries while playing for USM Alger.

- (Algeria) Kamel Tchalabi
- (Algeria) Ayoub Abdellaoui ^{13}
- (Algeria) **Merouane Abdouni**
- (Algeria) **Hocine Achiou** ^{8}
- (Algeria) **Tarek Hadj Adlane**
- (Algeria) **Rachid Aftouche**
- (Algeria) Mouldi Aïssaoui
- (Algeria) Saïd Allik
- (Algeria) **Djamel Amani**
- (Algeria) **Amar Ammour**
- (Algeria) **Salim Aribi** ^{8}
- (Algeria) **Ali Attoui**
- (Algeria) **Youcef Belaïli**
- (Algeria) **Boubekeur Belbekri** ^{1}
- (Algeria) Farid Belmellat
- (Algeria) Raouf Benguit ^{13}
- (Algeria) Fawzi Benkhalidi
- (Algeria) Mohammed Benkhemassa ^{13}
- (Algeria) **Mokhtar Benmoussa**
- (Algeria) Yacine Bentalaa
- (Algeria) **Abdelaziz Bentifour**
- (Algeria) Hamid Bernaoui
- (Algeria) Omar Betrouni
- (Algeria) Mohamed Boualem
- (Algeria) **Brahim Boudebouda**
- (Algeria) **Isâad Bourahli**
- (Algeria) Salim Boutamine
- (Algeria) Mehdi Cerbah
- (Algeria) **Farouk Chafaï**
- (Algeria) Noureddine Daham
- (Algeria) Oussama Darfalou ^{13}
- (Algeria) **Rabah Deghmani**
- (Algeria) **Abderrahmane Derouaz** ^{2} ^{3}
- (Algeria) **Farid Djahnine**
- (Algeria) **Billel Dziri** ^{4} ^{7}
- (Algeria) **Djamel El Okbi**
- (Algeria) Bouazza Feham
- (Algeria) **Zinedine Ferhat**
- (Algeria) **Karim Ghazi**
- (Algeria) **Tarek Ghoul** ^{5}
- (Algeria) **Nacer Guedioura**
- (Algeria) Abderrahmane Meziane ^{13}
- (Algeria) **Abderrahmane Meziani**
- (Algeria) **Moulay Haddou**
- (Algeria) **Fayçal Hamdani** ^{5}
- (Algeria) **Mohamed Hamdoud**
- (Algeria) **Djamel Keddou**
- (Algeria) **Nacereddine Khoualed** ^{10}
- (Algeria) **Hamza Koudri**
- (Algeria) **Abdelkader Laïfaoui**
- (Algeria) **Khaled Lemmouchia**
- (Algeria) **Mahieddine Meftah** ^{5} ^{6} ^{7}
- (Algeria) Djamel Menad
- (Algeria) **Hocine Metref**
- (Algeria) **Hichem Mezaïr** ^{8}
- (Algeria) Amokrane Oualiken
- (Algeria) Moncef Ouichaoui
- (Algeria) **Azzedine Rahim** ^{4}
- (Algeria) Krimo Rebih
- (Algeria) **Smaïl Slimani** ^{2}
- (Algeria) **Saad Tedjar** ^{11}
- (Algeria) Hamza Yacef
- (Algeria) **Mounir Zeghdoud** ^{5} ^{6} ^{7}
- (Algeria) **Lamine Zemmamouche** ^{12}
- (Algeria) **Djamel Zidane**
- (Algeria) **Mohamed Rabie Meftah** ^{14}
- (Algeria) Mohamed Benyahia ^{14}
- (Cameroon) Daniel Moncharé
- (France) Freddy Zemmour
- (Mali) **Mamadou Diallo** ^{9}
- (Mali) **Mintou Doucoure**
- (Madagascar) **Carolus Andriamatsinoro**
- (Mali) **Abdoulaye Maïga** ^{15}
- (Nigeria) Michael Eneramo
- (Algeria) **Nacer Zekri** ^{4}
- (Libya) **Muaid Ellafi**

Notes

- Note 1: played at the 1968 African Cup of Nations.
- Note 2: played at the 1980 African Cup of Nations.
- Note 3: played at the 1980 Summer Olympics.
- Note 4: played at the 1996 African Cup of Nations.
- Note 5: played at the 1998 African Cup of Nations.
- Note 6: played at the 2000 African Cup of Nations.
- Note 7: played at the 2002 African Cup of Nations.
- Note 8: played at the 2004 African Cup of Nations.
- Note 9: played at the 2004 Summer Olympics.
- Note 10: played at the 2011 African Nations.
- Note 11: played at the 2013 African Cup of Nations.
- Note 12: played at the 2014 FIFA World Cup.
- Note 13: played at the 2016 Summer Olympics.
- Note 14: played at the 2017 Africa Cup of Nations.
- Note 15: played at the 2012 Africa Cup of Nations.

== Records and statistics ==
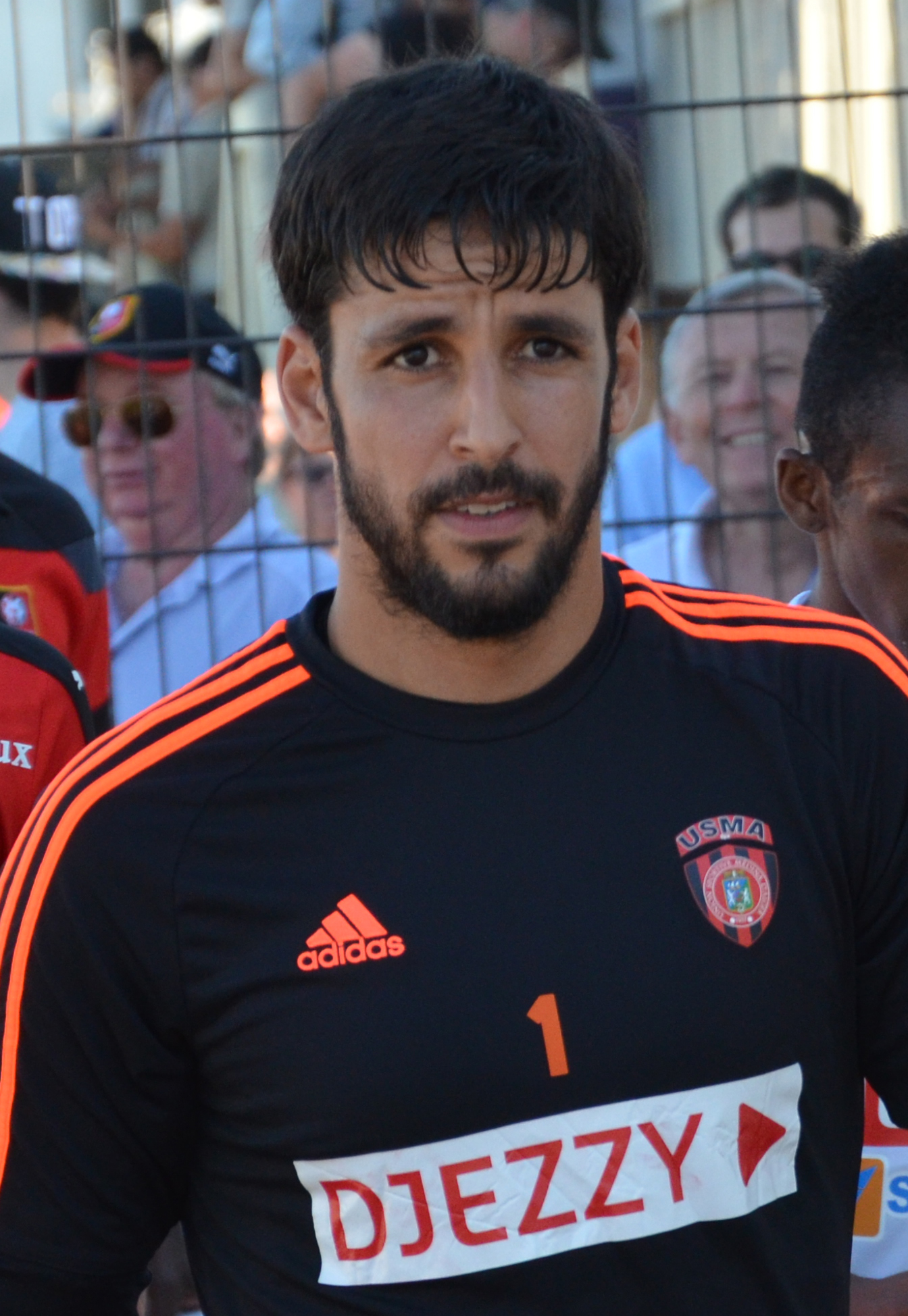
Goalkeeper and captain Mohamed Lamine Zemmamouche holds the club record for all-time appearances.

Mohamed Lamine Zemmamouche currently holds the team record for total number of games played with 400 matches until the end of the 2020–21 season, including 294 matches in the league. Nacereddine Khoualed has the second most appearances for the club with 286 matches. Karim Ghazi is the third most capped player with 241 matches. In the continental level, Hocine Achiou is the most capped player; involved in 38 matches, including 29 matches in the CAF Champions League. Malagasy Carolus Andriamatsinoro is the most capped foreign player with 132 matches in five seasons, also there is the French player Freddy Zemmour, who played with USMA six seasons immediately after the independence of Algeria and in unofficial statistics it is said that he played more than 200 matches with the team but can not be sure of that, Mahieddine Meftah is USM Alger's most capped international player. as for the scorers and beginning of the 1995–96 season Billel Dziri is the best scorer with 74 goals in all competitions and at the same time the best scorer in the League with 51 goals and in the continental competition with 16 goals, as for Tarek Hadj Adlane is the best scorer in the Algerian Cup with 11 goals also Moncef Ouichaoui is the only player of USM Alger in the history who won the league's top scorer in the 2002–03 season with 18 goals and at the continental level, Malian Mamadou Diallo won the top scorer of the CAF Champions League in 2004 with 10 goals.

USM Alger is the most team to reach the Algerian Cup final with 17 times, including five consecutive ones. The first cup achieved by the team was after seven finals in 1981 against ASM Oran, at that time the team was in the second division to become the first Algerian team to achieve the Algerian Cup at this level. The club is one of only four clubs to have won the Algerian Cup twice in succession, in 2003 and 2004. USMA share with ES Setif, MC Alger and CR Belouizdad the record of Algerian Cup titles with eight. USM Alger's biggest winning scoreline in a competitive match is 13–0, achieved against SO Berrouaghia in the Critériums d'Honneur in 1962 and League's biggest win was 11–0 against ASM Oran in the 1975–76 season. League's biggest loss was 1–7 against JS Kabylie in 1989 in Tizi Ouzou. USM Alger is the second most successful team in the Domestic League with (8) Titles. USM Alger have achieved "Doubles" once (in 2003). Every starting player in USM Alger's 48 games of the 2012–13 season was a full international – a new club record. USM Alger were also the second Algerian club to reach the final of the CAF Champions League, in 2015, losing 4–1 on aggregate to TP Mazembe. Noureddine Saâdi holds the record for most games managed with 133, winning two titles. Rolland Courbis is the first foreign coach to achieve a title with the team when he won the Algerian Cup in 2013. The 700,000 Euro transfer of Mamadou Diallo to Nantes in 2004 is the team's highest fee received for a player. The 400,000 Euros transfer of Kaddour Beldjilali from Étoile du Sahel in 2014 is the team's highest fee paid for a player.

== Statistics ==
=== Recent seasons ===
The season-by-season performance of the club over the last ten years

| Season | League | | | | | | | | | Cup | Other | Africa | | Top goalscorer(s)^{[A]} | | Ref. |
| Season | Division | Pos | Pts | P | W | D | L | GF | GA | Cup | Other | Africa | | Name | Goals | |
|---|---|---|---|---|---|---|---|---|---|---|---|---|---|---|---|---|
| 2014–15 | Ligue 1 | 8th | 41 | 30 | 10 | 11 | 9 | 35 | 27 | R16 | RU | Champions League | RU (Note: The competition ended in the following season) | Youcef Belaïli | 8 | |
| 2015–16 | Ligue 1 | 1st | 58 | 30 | 17 | 7 | 6 | 49 | 31 | R64 | | | | Mohamed Seguer | 12 | |
| 2016–17 | Ligue 1 | 3rd | 50 | 30 | 14 | 8 | 8 | 50 | 31 | R16 | W | Champions League | SF | Mohamed Rabie Meftah | 11 | |
| 2017–18 | Ligue 1 | 6th | 42 | 30 | 11 | 9 | 10 | 43 | 35 | R16 | | Confederation Cup | QF | Oussama Darfalou | 26 | |
| 2018–19 | Ligue 1 | 1st | 53 | 30 | 15 | 8 | 7 | 49 | 29 | R16 | | Arab Club Champions Cup | R2 | Prince Ibara | 10 | |
| 2019–20 | Ligue 1 (Note: On March 15, 2020, the Ligue de Football Professionnel (LFP) decided to halt the season due to the COVID-19 pandemic in Algeria. On July 29, 2020, the LFP declared that season is over and CR Belouizdad to be the champion, the promotion of four teams from the League 2, and scrapping the relegation for the current season.) | 6th (Note: USM Alger were deducted 3 points due to their withdrawal in their game against MC Alger. The decision has been appealed to the Court of Arbitration for Sport. On August 28, 2020, after postponing several times the final decision was made without appeal, which is to return the three points and repeat the match.) | 32 | 22 | 9 | 5 | 7 | 25 | 22 | R32 | | Champions League | Grp | Aymen Mahious | 12 | |
| 2020–21 | Ligue 1 | 4th | 65 | 38 | 19 | 8 | 11 | 62 | 39 | NP | RU | | | Ismail Belkacemi | 17 | |
| 2020–21 | Ligue 1 | 4th | 65 | 38 | 19 | 8 | 11 | 62 | 39 | NP | SF | | | Ismail Belkacemi | 17 | |
| 2021–22 | Ligue 1 | 4th | 57 | 34 | 15 | 12 | 7 | 45 | 22 | NP | | | | Mahious, Belkacemi | 8 | |
| 2022–23 | Ligue 1 | 11th | 40 | 30 | 11 | 7 | 11 | 31 | 27 | R64 | | Confederation Cup | W | Aymen Mahious | 11 | |
| 2023–24 | Ligue 1 | 4th | 49 | 30 | 15 | 4 | 11 | 40 | 32 | SF | | Confederation Cup | SF | Ismail Belkacemi | 17 | |
| 2023–24 | Ligue 1 | 4th | 49 | 30 | 15 | 4 | 11 | 40 | 32 | SF | | CAF Super Cup | W | Ismail Belkacemi | 17 | |

=== In Africa ===
As of 23 September 2023:

CAF competitions
| Competition | Seasons | Played | Won | Drawn | Lost | Goals For | Goals Against | Last season played |
|---|---|---|---|---|---|---|---|---|
| Champions League | 9 | 80 | 37 | 19 | 24 | 132 | 82 | 2019–20 |
| CAF Cup Winners' Cup (defunct) | 5 | 25 | 13 | 4 | 8 | 40 | 25 | 2002 |
| CAF Confederation Cup | 7 | 42 | 19 | 13 | 9 | 49 | 31 | 2025–26 |
| CAF Cup (defunct) | 1 | 6 | 4 | 0 | 2 | 13 | 6 | 1999 |
| CAF Super Cup | 1 | 1 | 1 | 0 | 0 | 1 | 0 | 2023 |
| Total | 23 | 169 | 76 | 40 | 45 | 240 | 150 | |

=== Non-CAF competitions ===
As of 10 December 2018:

Non-CAF competitions
| Competition | Seasons | Played | Won | Drawn | Lost | Goals For | Goals Against | Last season played |
|---|---|---|---|---|---|---|---|---|
| Arab Champions League | 5 | 29 | 14 | 8 | 7 | 46 | 34 | 2018–19 |
| Maghreb Cup Winners Cup | 2 | 4 | 1 | 0 | 3 | 3 | 6 | 1970 |
| Total | 7 | 33 | 15 | 8 | 10 | 49 | 38 | |
