= 1995–96 Algerian Championnat National =

Algerian Championnat National
- Season: 1995–96
- Champions: USM Alger
- Relegated: USM Blida; ASM Oran; JS Bordj Ménaïel
- Matches: 240
- Goals: 492 (2.05 per match)
- Top goalscorer: Mohamed Brahimi (14 goals)
- Biggest home win: MC Oran 7 - 0 AS Aïn M'lila
- Biggest away win: WA Boufarik 1 - 4 USM Alger; CR Belouizdad 0 - 3 MC Alger
- Highest scoring: USM Blida 3 - 5 MC Oran; USM Blida 3 - 5 USM Aïn Beïda

The 1995–96 Algerian Championnat National was the 34th season of the Algerian Championnat National since its establishment in 1962. A total of 16 teams contested the league, with JS Kabylie as the defending champions, The Championnat started on September 14, 1995. and ended in August 1996.

== Team summaries ==
=== Promotion and relegation ===
Teams promoted from Algerian Division 2 1995-1996

- MO Constantine
- NA Hussein Dey
- WA Mostaganem

Teams relegated to Algerian Division 2 1996-1997

- USM Blida
- ASM Oran
- JS Bordj Ménaïel

== League table ==
Pos	Team	Pld	W	D	L	GF	GA	GD	Pts	Qualification or relegation
1	USM Alger (C)	30	19	3	8	39	24	+15	60	1997 CAF Champions League
2	MC Oran (Q)	30	17	7	6	53	21	+32	58	1997 CAF Cup
3	USM Aïn Beïda (Q)	30	15	6	9	37	31	+6	51	1997 African Cup Winners' Cup
4	WA Tlemcen (Q)	30	15	6	9	39	20	+19	51	1997 Arab Club Champions Cup
5	JS Kabylie	30	13	6	11	34	29	+5	45	
6	CS Constantine	30	11	10	9	25	20	+5	43	
7	USM El Harrach	30	12	7	11	24	26	−2	43	
8	MC Alger	30	12	4	14	29	32	−3	40	
9	US Chaouia	30	11	6	13	28	33	−5	39	
10	CA Batna	30	12	3	15	35	44	−9	39	
11	AS Aïn M'lila	30	10	8	12	18	30	−12	38	
12	CR Belouizdad	30	10	8	12	27	34	−7	38	
13	WA Boufarik	30	10	5	15	25	42	−17	35	
14	USM Blida (R)	30	9	7	14	34	36	−2	34	1996-97 Division 2
15	ASM Oran (R)	30	7	10	13	23	31	−8	31	1996-97 Division 2
16	JS Bordj Ménaïel (R)	30	3	11	16	22	41	−19	20	1996-97 Division 2

Rules for classification: 1) points; 2) goal difference; 3) number of goals scored.
(C) Champions; (Q) Qualified for the phase indicated; (R) Relegated
