= Azzedine Rahim =

Algerian footballer (born 1972)

Personal information
- Full name: Azzedine Rahim
- Date of birth: March 31, 1972 (age 54)
- Place of birth: Algiers, Algeria
- Position: Striker

Senior career*
Years	Team	Apps	(Gls)
1987–2000	USM Alger	-	(-)
2000–2001	CS Constantine	-	(-)
2001–2002	JSM Béjaïa	-	(-)
2002–2003	CA Batna	15	(0)
2003–2004	ES Sétif	15	(1)
2004–2005	CA Bordj Bou Arreridj	3	(0)

International career
1995–1996	Algeria	4	(0)

Managerial career
- 2018–2019: USM Alger (assistant)
- 2019–2020: NA Hussein Dey (assistant)
- 2021–2022: USM Alger (assistant)
- 2022: NC Magra
- * Club domestic league appearances and goals

Azzedine Rahim (Arabic: عز الدين رحيم; born 31 March 1972), is a retired Algerian international footballer

== Club career ==
Azzedine Rahim grew up in the Casbah and began playing football at USM Alger. He quickly made his mark, and in 1987 he played his first senior game at the age of 15 and a half against the USM El Harrach. While he is still only cadet. During the 1994-1995 season, he participated greatly in the accession of his club in the first division after five years spent in Division 2.

=== Injury ===
In 1996, Azzedine was at the height of his skill and represented one of the greatest hopes of football Algerian. In advanced contacts with the Belgian Football Club of KV Mechelen, and in the viewfinder of other clubs, in France Olympique de Marseille Le Havre AC and Portugal, his career changed when, in the Algiers derby against the MC Alger, defender Tarek Lazizi mowed him and severely injured him in the knee, causing him to rupture the cruciate and lateral ligaments. His convalescence lasted more than two years, and required his departure to Salt Lake City, United States to benefit from Dr. Tom Rosenberg's sports medicine expertise.

=== Back ===
When he returned to the competition in 1999, Rahim did not succeed in winning the USMA, the player deplores the lack of confidence placed in him, despite the fact That the championship takes place without relegation. He then deposited his suitcases with Constantine to evolve in the local sporting club.

== National team statistics ==
Algeria national team
Year	Apps	Goals
1995	2	0
1996	2	0
Total	4	0

== Honours ==
- Won the Algerian league one in 1996 with USM Alger
- Won the Algerian Cup twice in 1997 and 1999 with USM Alger
