= Nacer Zekri =

Algerian footballer (born 1971)

Personal information
- Date of birth: 3 August 1971 (age 55)
- Position: Forward

International career
| Years | Team | Apps | (Gls) |
| 1990–1996 | Algeria | 19 | (5) |

Nacer Zekri (born 3 August 1971) is an Algerian former footballer who played as a forward. He made 19 appearances for the Algeria national team from 1990 to 1996. He was also named in Algeria's squad for the 1996 African Cup of Nations tournament.
