= El Harrouch District =

Coordinates: 36.6531°N 6.8364°E

El Harrouch District دائرة الحروش
- District
- Map of Algeria highlighting Skikda Province
- Country: Algeria
- Province: Skikda
- District seat: El Harrouch

Government
  - District chief: Mr. Zair Mohammed Cherif

Area
  - Total: 572.40 km^{2} (221.00 sq mi)

Population (1998)
  - Total: 104,835
  - Density: 183.15/km^{2} (474.36/sq mi)
- Time zone: UTC+01 (CET)
- Municipalities: 5

El Harrouch is a district in Skikda Province, Algeria. It is one of the 3 districts in the province that do not lie on the Mediterranean Sea. It was named after its capital, El Harrouch.

== Municipalities ==
The district is further divided into 5 municipalities:

- El Harrouch
- Zerdazas
- Salah Bouchaour
- Ouled Hbaba
- Emdjez Edchich
