= Philippeville massacre =

1955 attack in the Algerian War

Coordinates: 36°52′22″N 6°54′36″E

- Part of the Algerian War
Date	20 August 1955
Location	Philippeville, Constantine Department, French Algeria
Result	See the Aftermath section

Belligerents
FLN	French Republic

Commanders and leaders
Youcef Zighoud; Salah Boubnider	(France) Paul Aussaresses

Units involved
Wilaya II	(France) 41st Parachute Demi-Brigade

Casualties and losses
3,000 to 5,000 (French historian); 12,000 dead (FLN claim); 1,273 killed (French claim)	123

The Philippeville massacre, also known as the Battle of Philippeville or the August Offensive, was a series of raids launched on 20 August 1955 on various cities and towns of the Constantine region by FLN insurgents and armed mobs during the Algerian War between France and the Algerian rebels. The raids, which mostly took the form of ethnic riots, resulted in the massacre of several dozens of European settlers, known as pieds-noirs. The massacres were then followed by reprisals by the French Army and pied-noir vigilantes, which resulted in the death of several thousand Muslim Algerians. The events of late August 1955 in the Constantinois region are considered to be a major turning point of the Algerian War.

== Background ==
The Algerian War began on 1 November 1954, when the FLN launched "scores of scores of spectacular attacks". The conflict quickly escalated, as evidenced by the remarks of the Socialist Minister of the Interior, François Mitterrand: "I will not agree to negotiate with the enemies of the homeland. The only negotiation is war!" The French adopted an increasingly aggressive policy in Algeria, and in early March 1955, the French government of Prime Minister Pierre Mendès France was replaced by that of Edgar Faure.

By summer 1955, the steady pressure of French counterinsurgency had put the FLN in a very dire situation. Only one of the FLN's sections, Wilaya II, was capable of mounting any offensive. Popular support for the FLN was still rather low and many of the Algerian Muslim elite advocated for a peaceful resolution of the conflict through conciliatory agreements with the French government.

To put the FLN in a stronger position, Youcef Zighoud, the leader of the Wilaya II, decided to conduct an attack against pied-noir civilians in Algeria and hoped that an aggressive French retaliation would break the fragile bond between French colonists and native Algerians, increase the popular support for the rebellion and destroy any possibility for a conciliatory settlement of the conflict.

The French military learned about Zighoud's plans when one of General Paul Aussaresses's informants, an Arab baker in Philippeville, told Aussaresses that he used to sell on average a sack of flour every three days but that he was now selling two tons of flour every day to men whom he did not know and who paid only cash. That made Aussaresses deduce that the spike in flour sales must have been because the FLN was concentrating men in the hills above Philippeville, which could mean only that an operation was due to start soon.

== FLN attack ==
On 20 August 1955, a few hundred FLN members gathered crowds of several thousand local Muslim civilians, who were influenced by motivations of racial hatred. False rumours were spread of an imminent landing by Egyptian troops, and the Muslim groups were directed towards various settlements in the Constantinois during a series of co-ordinated raids.

=== Raid on Philippeville ===
The main attack was conducted on the city of Philippeville, which is now known as Skikda. A large mob of several thousands civilians, led by FLN members, launched a general assault on the city with the aims of attacking Europeans and moderate Muslim personalities and taking over the police station's weaponry. Only half of the insurgents were armed with firearms, and the rest carried farming tools, knives or makeshift bombs device. As the mob arrived in the city, Europeans in the streets were murdered on sight. However, the reaction of police forces and French Army paratroopers was swift, and the insurrection was soon defeated after 14 police officers had been killed during the crackdown. Once the assault was over, the bodies of over 100 insurgents were found in the streets, with many more captured by French forces.

=== El-Halia mine massacre ===
The largest massacre of the day occurred at the El-Halia pyrite mining town, where about 130 Europeans and 2,000 Muslims lived and worked together. The mob was composed of hundreds of Muslims, both men and women, who were mostly armed with farming tools, axes, sharpened shovels, or knives and were led by 25 FLN members. They arrived at about 11 a.m., when most of the pied-noir men were working in the mine, and women and children were at home. A bloody massacre ensued in which European women were raped and disembowelled or decapitated, children had their throats slit and babies were slammed against walls. Some of the local Muslim inhabitants who had initially watched without reacting eventually joined the excited mob as it massacred Europeans under chants of Allahu Akbar that blended with Algerian women's ululations. The attack caused the murder of 37 Europeans, mostly women and children.

=== Attack on El Khroub military outpost ===
Near El Khroub, a crowd of a few hundred ill-armed Muslim civilians, including women and children, led by a few FLN members, launched an assault on a French military outpost that was held by 150 soldiers. Their goal was to kill the garrison to take over the heavy weapons and ammunitions stock. The attack was repulsed without any French casualties, and 12 uniform-wearing FLN members, 15 civilian men, 19 women and 11 children or teenagers were killed.

=== Terror attacks in Constantine ===
In Constantine, eight FLN commandos of about ten men each launched a series of terror attacks on a number of specific targets. Allouah Abbas, nephew of Ferhat Abbas and a moderate local politician who had advocated for conciliation with the French government, was murdered in the pharmacy that he owned. Chérif Hadj-Saïd, another prominent moderate politician, was also shot but survived. A local police inspector, Robert Laemmel, was assassinated in front of a cafe. Grenades were thrown at a police station, and a movie theatre and a restaurant were bombed. Several bombs exploded in the Jewish area of the city and killed two and wounded dozens.

=== Other attacks ===
Smaller scale attacks on Europeans also took place in various villages of the region. Pied-noir newspapers reported atrocities in Aïn Abid, such as Bernadette Mello, a 5-day old newborn who was cut into pieces in front of her mother, whose belly was then opened to stuff the pieces back inside. In reality, the infant was killed when her head was crushed, but she was never cut up. In Ramdane Djamel, 13 Europeans were murdered. In Collo, four policemen and six European civilians were killed. The car of a Jewish family was stopped by the mob on a road near Ramdane Djamel. Haïm Benchetrit was forcibly pulled out of the vehicle, before being castrated and choked to death with his own genitals in front of his wife and their three children, aged 11, 5 and 3, who were then killed.

== French retaliation ==
After the initial shock of the attacks, French reprisals began. A number of Algerian men who had been arrested during or after the attacks were executed without trial. When French paratroopers arrived at El-Halia a few hours after the attack, they rounded up about 80 Algerian men who were on the site and shot them without any further investigation. At El Khroub, 60 insurgents who had been captured during the attack were shot on the same day, and many other men were arrested based on suspicions and shot in the following days.

In the following days, several shepherd villages that were suspected to be harbouring FLN members or to have taken part in the attacks were razed by the French Air Force.

The total death toll of the French reprisals is uncertain (estimates vary from 1,200 to 12,000), but as at Setif ten years earlier, the number of Algerians killed in retaliation for the initial massacre of Europeans was disproportionate. French Historian Benjamin Stora estimates 10,000 Muslims were killed in retaliation by the French military and pied-noir militias in the Constantine region. The French anticolonial militant Daniel Guérin estimated the number of men who were executed in Philippeville proper at 2,000. A French military report gave a number of 750 men executed in the El Harrouch area.

=== Philippeville stadium scandal ===
In Philippeville, the city's stadium was turned into an interrogation centre by the French Army. The nature of the assault, which had been conducted mainly by civilians without uniforms made the army round up thousands of Algerian males who had been in the streets during the attack and not attempt to distinguish the uninvolved inhabitants from the insurgents who were guilty of involvement in the initial attacks on pied-noir civilians. The men were briefly interrogated at the stadium before they were executed without any proper investigation or trial.

The French reporter Robert Lambotte took a photograph depicting the lined up bodies of executed Algerians in the stadium and published it in the communist newspaper L'Humanité, which sparked national outrage in France.

=== Pieds-Noirs vigilante reprisals ===
Shocked and enraged by the atrocities that had been inflicted upon European civilians, some of the pieds-noirs began forming vigilante militias. Philippeville Mayor Paul-Dominique Benquet-Crevaux armed the militias, which soon started exercising random reprisals upon Algerians that killed dozens. After the end of the victims' funerals, seven Algerians were lynched in the streets. The fact that some of the anti-European atrocities had been committed by trusted Muslim neighbors alongside whom the victims had lived for years created widespread paranoia among the pied-noir community, and some in it soon started seeing every Muslim as a potential attacker.

Fearing for their safety, armed vigilantes fired at any Muslim whose behaviour they deemed suspicious and killed or wounded many innocent Algerians. In one incident, a group of pied-noir vigilantes got involved in a firefight with French soldiers whom they had mistaken for FLN rebels, which prompted French authorities to start disarming vigilantes.

== Death toll ==
The total death toll of the Constantinois attack in late August is uncertain. On the day of the attacks, French authorities gave an official figure of 71 European civilians, 21 native Algerian civilians and 31 law enforcement officers killed by insurgents during the FLN's actions. However, many survivors were severely wounded or maimed, and some later died of their wounds. The historian Roger Vétillard gave a total figure of 117 European civilians, 42 Algerian civilians and 47 law enforcers who ultimately died as a result of the 20 August FLN's attacks.

The death toll of French retaliations remains heavily disputed. French authorities gave an official figure of 1,273 native Algerians killed, which is widely considered to be underestimated. The FLN claimed that as many as 12,000 had been killed by French repression. The French historian and Colonial Algeria specialist Charles-Robert Ageron estimated the number of native Algerians killed as a result of French retaliations to have been between 3,000 and 5,000.

== Aftermath ==
The events of 20 August 1955 are widely considered to be a major turning point of the Algerian War. Just as Zighoud had intended, the massacre of the pied-noirs, followed by the violent French reprisals, created an irreparable divide between the European and the native communities. The peaceful "third way" was no longer an option, and many former moderates on both sides ended up forced to choose unambiguous positions. As such, the operation was thus considered a great success by Zighoud despite its failure to take the much-needed weapons from the targeted military outposts and police stations and the relatively small number of Europeans killed compared to the Algerian death toll.

Despite the undeniable political success of the operation, Zighoud's cynical disregard for Algerian lives was frowned upon by several high-ranking members of the FLN. Abane Ramdane and Larbi Ben M'hidi notably criticized his decision to send barely-armed Algerian civilians with almost no weapons to a certain death for a result of fewer than 100 Europeans being killed. Ramdane also condemned the murder and the mutilation of European babies, which he feared would cause the revolution to be associated with fanatical madness and decrease international support for the cause of Algerian independence.

Three weeks after the event, a group of 61 prominent Algerian Muslim politicians, who had thus far adopted moderate positions and who believed that it was possible for Algerians to become French by adopting the French language, wrote a public declaration "condemning the blind repression" in Philippeville; declared the French government's policy of integration of Algerian Muslims to be a failure; and wrote that in the wake of the blind and bloody repression against Muslims in Philippeville, the vast majority of Algerians had become nationalists who now believed in the "idée nationale algérienne" ("Algerian national ideal"). By late 1955, the number of FLN fighters in the Constantine region had increased by a threefold.

Jacques Soustelle, the recently appointed Governor of Algeria, who had thus far defended conciliatory approach on Algerian nationalism, was profoundly traumatized by his visit at the El-Halia mine after the attacks. After the events of late August 1955, he became convinced that no negotiation was possible with "FLN terrorists", and he would keep getting increasingly radicalised as the war progressed.

The French pied-noir intellectual Albert Camus, who had written several articles to bring attention on the condition of native Algerians, was appalled by the horrific massacre of European children and completely rejected the FLN as terrorists. As he later wrote: "If I can understand and admire freedom fighters, I have only disgust for murderers of women and children".

After August 1955, the brutality of the Algerian War dramatically increased in intensity, and war crimes on both sides became commonplace as FLN rebels and the French army became more and more radicalised.
