= 2013–14 MO Constantine season =

MO Constantine
2013–14 season
- Chairman: Abd el-hak DEMIGHA
- Manager: Djamal ADLANI
- Stadium: Stade Mohamed Hamlaoui
- Ligue Nationale du Football Amateur: 2nd
- Algerian Cup: Round of 1/4
Home colours	Away colours

== LNFA ==
=== Results by round ===
Round	1	2	3	4	5	6	7	8	9	10	11	12	13	14	15	16	17	18	19	20	21	22	23	24	25	26	27	28	29	30
Ground	A	H	A	H	A	H	A	H	A	H	A	A	H	A	H	H	A	H	A	H	A	H	A	H	A	H	H	A	H	A
Result	W	W	L	W	L	W	L	W	W	W	D	D	W	W	W	W	L	W	W	W	L	W	D	W	L	L	W	L	D	L
Position	1	1	3	1	4	1	2	1	1	1	1	2	2	2	2	2	2	2	2	2	2	2	2	2	2	2	2	2	2	2

Updated to match(es) played on 8 December 2013. Source: Competitive matches
A = Away; H = Home; W = Win; D = Draw; L = Loss

=== Matches ===
6 September 2013 1	NRB Touggourt	0 – 3	MO Constantine	Touggourt
16:00

13 September 2013 2	MO Constantine	4 – 0	USM Khenchela	Constantine
16:00				Stadium: Stade Mohamed Hamlaoui

20 September 2013 3	USF Bordj Bou Arreridj	1 – 0	MO Constantine	Bordj Bou Arreridj
16:00

27 September 2013 4	MO Constantine	1 – 0	US Tébessa	Constantine
15:00	SiAmmar			Stadium: Stade Mohamed Hamlaoui

5 October 2013 5	ES Guelma	2 – 1	MO Constantine	Guelma
15:00

18 October 2013 6	MO Constantine	2 – 0	Hamra Annaba	Constantine
15:00				Stadium: Stade Mohamed Hamlaoui

25 October 2013 7	WA Ramdane Djamel	1 – 0	MO Constantine	Azzaba
15:00 WA Ramdane Djamel

1 November 2013 8	MO Constantine	2 – 1	AS Aïn M'lila	Constantine
15:00				Stadium: Stade Mohamed Hamlaoui

8 November 2013 9	E Collo	0 – 1	MO Constantine	Collo
15:00				Stadium: Stadium of Collo

22 November 2013 10	MO Constantine	3 – 1	USM Ain Beida	Constantine
15:00				Stadium: Stade Mohamed Hamlaoui

9 December 2013 11	DRB Tadjenanet	1 – 1	MO Constantine	Tadjenanet
15:00			Imed BRAHMIA	Stadium: Stadium of Tadjenanet

13 December 2013 12	US Biskra	1 – 1	MO Constantine	Biskra
15:00			Siammar	Stadium: Stadium of Biskra

27 December 2013 13	MO Constantine	4 – 1	JSM Skikda	Constantine
15:00	Bouzar; Koraichi; Koraichi; Brahmia; (red card) Siammar		??? (red card) ??? (yellow card) (yellow-red card) ???	Stadium: Stade Mohamed Hamlaoui

3 January 2014 14	NC Magra	0 – 1	MO Constantine	Magra
15:00			77' Brahmia	Stadium: Stadium of Magra

10 January 2014 15	MO Constantine	2 – 1	HB Chelghoum Laid	Constantine
15:00	Brahmia 47'; Boukhlouf 88'		30' (pen.) Djamaoui	Stadium: Stade Mohamed Hamlaoui

31 January 2014 16	MO Constantine	4 - 0	NRB Touggourt	Constantine
15:00	Lemaissi; Brahmia; Chetih; Siammar			Stadium: Stade Mohamed Hamlaoui

7 February 2014 17	USM Khenchela	1 - 0	MO Constantine	Khenchela Kais
15:00				Stadium: 8 may 1945

25 February 2014 18	MO Constantine	2 - 0	USF Bordj Bou Arreridj	Constantine
15:00	Bouraba; Ferhat			Stadium: Stade Mohamed Hamlaoui

22 February 2014 19	US Tébessa	0 - 2	MO Constantine	Tébessa
14:00			Bouzar 20'; Korichi 91'	Stadium: Stadium 4 Mars

1 March 2014 20	MO Constantine	3 - 2	ES Guelma	Constantine
14:00				Stadium: Stade Mohamed Hamlaoui

7 March 2014 21	Hamra Annaba	2 - 1	MO Constantine	Annaba
15:00			Haouch	Stadium: Chabou Abdelkader

14 March 2014 22	MO Constantine	3 - 0	WA Ramdane Djamel	Constantine
15:00	Bouraba 2'; Bouzar; Brahmia			Stadium: Stade Mohamed Hamlaoui

21 March 2014 23	AS Aïn M'lila	1 - 1	MO Constantine	Aïn M'lila
15:00			Brahmia	Stadium: Stadium Demane Debih

29 March 2014 24	MO Constantine	4 - 1	E Collo	Constantine
15:00				Stadium: Stade Mohamed Hamlaoui

25 April 2014 25	USM Ain Beida	1 - 0	MO Constantine	Aïn Beïda
15:00

2 May 2014 26	MO Constantine	0 - 2	DRB Tadjenanet	Constantine
15:00				Stadium: Stade Mohamed Hamlaoui

9 May 2014 27	MO Constantine	3 - 1	US Biskra	Constantine
15:00				Stadium: Stade Mohamed Hamlaoui

13 May 2014 28	JSM Skikda	3 - 1	MO Constantine	Skikda
15:00

17 May 2014 29	MO Constantine	3 - 3	NC Magra	Constantine
15:00				Stadium: Stade Mohamed Hamlaoui

23 May 2014 30	HB Chelghoum Laid	2 - 0	MO Constantine	Chelghoum Laid
15:00

== Algerian Cup ==
6 September 2013 3rd	MO Constantine	1 – 0	CR Village Moussa	Skikda
15:00				Stadium: Stadium of Collo

13 September 2013 4th	MO Constantine	1 – 0	USM Setif	Stadium of Chelghoum Laid
14:30				Stadium: Stade de Collo

6 December 2013 1/32	Chabab Abadla	1 – 4	MO Constantine	Stadium of Abbadla
14:30

20 December 2013 1/16	AS Khroub	2 – 2 (3 – 4 p)	MO Constantine	El Khroub
14:30	45' Djemaouini; 53' Djemaouini		44' Brahmia; 56' Brahmia	Stadium: Stade Abad Hamdani; Referee: Sakhraoui

24 January 2014 1/8	US Beni Douala	0 – 1	MO Constantine	Tizi Ouzou
15:00			24' Brahmia	Stadium: Stade 1er Novembre 1954

18 February 2014 1/4	CRB Aïn Fakroun	2 - 1	MO Constantine	Aïn M'lila
14:30			20' Siammar	Stadium: Demane-Debbih
