= Ouled Attia District =

Coordinates: 35.5333°N 2.1667°E

Ouled Attia District دائرة اولاد عطية
- District
- Map of Algeria highlighting Skikda Province
- Country: Algeria
- Province: Skikda
- District seat: Ouled Attia

Government
  - District chief: Mr. Boufdjili M'Barak

Area
  - Total: 239.04 km^{2} (92.29 sq mi)

Population (1998)
  - Total: 21,580
  - Density: 90.28/km^{2} (233.8/sq mi)
- Time zone: UTC+01 (CET)
- Municipalities: 3

Ouled Attia is a district in Skikda Province, Algeria, on the western Mediterranean Sea coastline of the province. It is one of the less densely populated districts of the province. It was named after its capital, Ouled Attia.

== Municipalities ==
The district is further divided into 3 municipalities:

- Ouled Attia
- Oued Z'hor
- Kheneg Mayoum
