= Tamalous District =

Coordinates: 36.8361°N 6.6417°E

Tamalous District دائرة تمالوس
- District
- Map of Algeria highlighting Skikda Province

- Map of Skikda Province highlighting Tamalous District
- Country: Algeria
- Province: Skikda
- District seat: Tamalous

Government
  - District chief: Mr. Sâoudi Mohammed

Area
  - Total: 368.09 km^{2} (142.12 sq mi)

Population (1998)
  - Total: 80,936
  - Density: 219.88/km^{2} (569.49/sq mi)
- Time zone: UTC+01 (CET)
- Municipalities: 3

Tamalous is a district in Skikda Province, Algeria, on the Mediterranean Sea. It was named after its capital, Tamalous.

== Municipalities ==
The district is further divided into 3 municipalities:

- Tamalous
- Kerkera
- Bin El Ouiden
