= Azzaba District =

Coordinates: 36.7333°N 7.1000°E

Azzaba District دائرة عزابة
- District
- Map of Algeria highlighting Skikda Province

- Map of Skikda Province highlighting Azzaba District
- Country: Algeria
- Province: Skikda
- District seat: Azzaba

Government
  - District chief: Mr. Malakh Loulki

Area
  - Total: 804.34 km^{2} (310.56 sq mi)

Population (1998)
  - Total: 92,339
  - Density: 114.80/km^{2} (297.33/sq mi)
- Time zone: UTC+01 (CET)
- Municipalities: 5

Azzaba is a district in Skikda Province, Algeria, on the Mediterranean Sea. It was named after its capital, Azzaba.

== Municipalities ==
The district is further divided into 5 municipalities:

- Azzaba
- Aïn Charchar
- Essebt
- El Ghedir
- Djendel Saadi Mohamed
