= Oued Zeggar ambush =

1957 military operation of the Algerian War

- Part of Algerian War
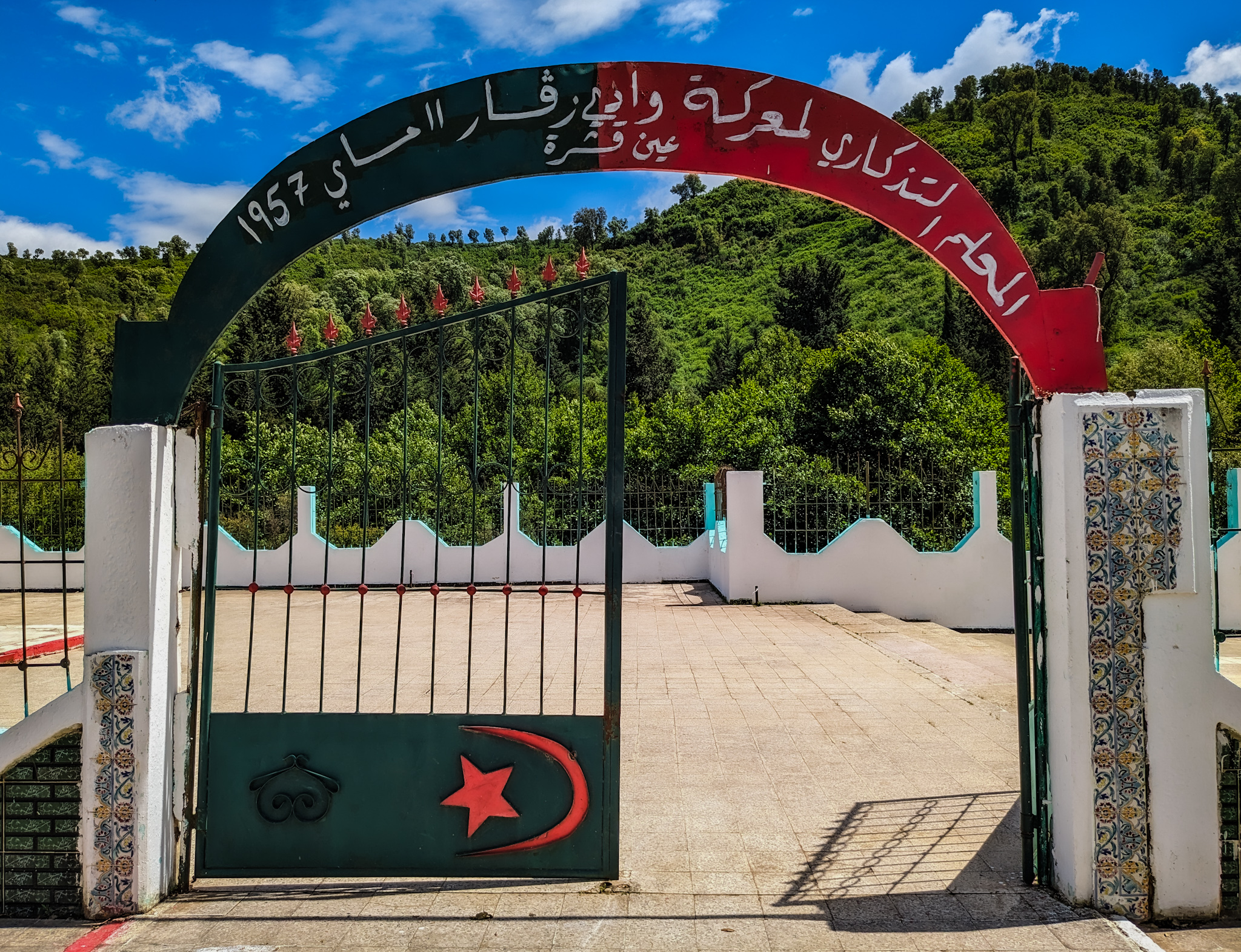
- Monument in Aïn Kechra
Date	11 May 1957
Location	Aïn Kechra, Algeria
Result	ALN victory

Belligerents
(Algeria) ALN	France

Commanders and leaders
(Algeria) Bouali Messaoud	Unknown

Strength
300 or 600 men	100+ men 7 Tanks; 17 Military Trucks

Casualties and losses
Algerian claims: None or 3	Algerian claims: 100 or 90 dead 1 or 12 captured

The Oued Zeggar ambush, or the battle of Aïn Kechra, was a military operation by the National Liberation Army (ALN) to ambush a French military convoy near Aïn Kechra, Skikda Province, Algeria in 1957.

== Background ==
On 11 May 1957, a unit of the National Liberation Army (ALN) took up positions along the road stretching from a bridge over the Oued Zeggar to the town of Zitouna. They maintained their positions along the bends of the valley from 2 a.m. until 4 p.m. Later in the day, they spotted a small French military convoy moving along the river.

== Battle ==
The French forces comprised over 100 soldiers accompanied by 7 tanks and 17 military trucks carrying ammunition and valuable equipment. In contrast, the ALN consisted of approximately 600 or 300 fighters.

The military convoy fell into the ambush set by the detachment, and after its destruction, they seized a substantial amount of ammunition and equipment, including heavy machine guns. In the battle, approximately 100 or 90 French soldiers were killed, with 1 or 12 captured, with either no casualties or 3 on the ALN side.

== Aftermath ==
In retaliation, the French forces burned down the village, slaughtered civilians and their livestock, and further declared Aïn Kechra a forbidden area.
