= Zitouna District =

Coordinates: 37.0000°N 6.4000°E

Zitouna District دائرة زيتونة
- District
- Map of Algeria highlighting Skikda Province

- Map of Skikda Province highlighting Zitouna District
- Country: Algeria
- Province: Skikda
- District seat: Zitouna, Skikda|Zitouna

Government
  - District chief: Mr. Kharnane Abdellah

Area
  - Total: 213.21 km^{2} (82.32 sq mi)

Population (1998)
  - Total: 26,093
  - Density: 122.38/km^{2} (316.97/sq mi)
- Time zone: UTC+01 (CET)
- Municipalities: 2

Zitouna is a district in Skikda Province, Algeria. It is one of the four landlocked districts of this province which lies on the Mediterranean Sea. It was named after its capital, Aïn Kechra.

== Municipalities ==
The district is further divided into two municipalities:

- Zitouna
- Kanoua
