= Ben Azzouz District =

Coordinates: 36.4600°N 7.1300°E

Ben Azzouz District دائرة بن عزوز
- District
- Map of Algeria highlighting Skikda Province

- Map of Skikda Province highlighting Ben Azzouz District
- Country: Algeria
- Province: Skikda
- District seat: Ben Azzouz

Government
  - District chief: Mr. Menia Djamel

Area
  - Total: 504.19 km^{2} (194.67 sq mi)

Population (1998)
  - Total: 45,139
  - Density: 89.528/km^{2} (231.88/sq mi)
- Time zone: UTC+01 (CET)
- Municipalities: 3

Ben Azzouz is a district in Skikda Province, Algeria, on the Mediterranean Sea, it is one of the less densely populated districts of the province. It was named after its capital, Ben Azzouz.

== Municipalities ==
The district is further divided into 3 municipalities:

- Benazouz
- El Marsa
- Bekkouche Lakhdar
