= El Hadaik District =

Coordinates: 36°49′32″N 6°53′18″E

El Hadaik District دائرة الحدائق
- District
- Map of Algeria highlighting Skikda Province

- Map of Skikda Province highlighting El Hadaik District
- Country: Algeria
- Province: Skikda
- District seat: El Hadaik

Government
  - District chief: Mr. Abbas Abdelghani

Area
  - Total: 271.75 km^{2} (104.92 sq mi)

Population (1998)
  - Total: 23,605
  - Density: 86.863/km^{2} (224.97/sq mi)
- Time zone: UTC+01 (CET)
- Municipalities: 3

El Hadaik is a district in Skikda Province, Algeria on the Mediterranean Sea. It was named after its capital, El Hadaik.

== Municipalities ==
The district is further divided into 3 municipalities:

- El Hadaik
- Aïn Zouit
- Bouchtata
