= Aïn Kechra District (Skikda Province) =

Coordinates: 36.7483°N 6.4325°E

Aïn Kechra District دائرة عين قشرة
- District
- Map of Algeria highlighting Skikda Province

- Map of Skikda Province highlighting Aïn Kechra District
- Country: Algeria
- Province: Skikda
- District seat: Aïn Kechra

Government
  - District chief: Mr. Maâtalia Amar

Area
  - Total: 213.21 km^{2} (82.32 sq mi)

Population (1998)
  - Total: 26,093
  - Density: 122.38/km^{2} (316.97/sq mi)
- Time zone: UTC+01 (CET)
- Municipalities: 2

Aïn Kechra is a district in Skikda Province, Algeria. It is one of the 4 landlocked districts of this province which lies on the Mediterranean Sea. It was named after its capital, Aïn Kechra.

== Municipalities ==
The district is further divided into 2 municipalities:

- Aïn Kechra
- Ouldja Boulballout
