= Sidi Mezghiche District =

Coordinates: 36.6833°N 6.7167°E

Sidi Mezghiche District دائرة سيدي مزغيش
- District
- Map of Algeria highlighting Skikda Province

- Map of Skikda Province highlighting Sidi Mezghiche District
- Country: Algeria
- Province: Skikda
- District seat: Sidi Mezghiche

Government
  - District chief: Mr. Bedoui Saâd

Area
  - Total: 332.23 km^{2} (128.27 sq mi)

Population (1998)
  - Total: 50,615
  - Density: 152.35/km^{2} (394.58/sq mi)
- Time zone: UTC+01 (CET)
- Municipalities: 3

Sidi Mezghiche is a district in Skikda Province, Algeria. It is one of three districts in the province that do not lie on the Mediterranean Sea. It was named after its capital, Sidi Mezghiche.

== Municipalities ==
The district is further divided into 3 municipalities:

- Sidi Mezghiche
- Aïn Bouziane
- Beni Oulbane
