= Collo District =

Coordinates: 37.0065°N 6.5609°E

Collo District دائرة القل
- District
- Map of Algeria highlighting Skikda Province

- Map of Skikda Province highlighting Collo District
- Country: Algeria
- Province: Skikda
- District seat: Collo

Government
  - District chief: Mr. Kebaïli Smaïne

Area
  - Total: 228.28 km^{2} (88.14 sq mi)

Population (1998)
  - Total: 63,071
  - Density: 276.29/km^{2} (715.58/sq mi)
- Time zone: UTC+01 (CET)
- Municipalities: 3

Collo is a district in Skikda Province, Algeria, on the western Mediterranean Sea coastline of the province, it is also one of the most densely populated districts of the province. It was named after its capital, Collo.

== Municipalities ==
The district is further divided into 3 municipalities:

- Collo
- Beni Zid
- Cheraia
