= Ramdane Djamel District =

Coordinates: 36.7500°N 6.9000°E

Ramdane Djamel District دائرة رمضان جمال
- District
- Map of Algeria highlighting Skikda Province

- Map of Skikda Province highlighting Ramdane Djamel District
- Country: Algeria
- Province: Skikda
- District seat: Ramdane Djamel

Government
  - District chief: Mr. Salhi Mohammed

Area
  - Total: 158.99 km^{2} (61.39 sq mi)

Population (1998)
  - Total: 32,120
  - Density: 202.0/km^{2} (523.2/sq mi)
- Time zone: UTC+01 (CET)
- Municipalities: 2

Ramdane Djamel is a district in Skikda Province, Algeria. It is one of 3 districts in the province that do not lie on the Mediterranean Sea. It was named after its capital, Ramdane Djamel.

== Municipalities ==
The district is further divided into 2 municipalities:

- Ramdane Djamel
- Beni Bechir
