= Skikda District =

Coordinates: 36.8667°N 6.9000°E

Skikda District دائرة سكيكدة
- District
- Map of Algeria highlighting Skikda Province

- Map of Skikda Province highlighting Skikda District
- Country: Algeria
- Province: Skikda
- District seat: Skikda

Government
  - District chief: Mrs. Bouhmatou Nassima

Area
  - Total: 162.33 km^{2} (62.68 sq mi)

Population (1998)
  - Total: 199,921
  - Density: 1,231.6/km^{2} (3,189.8/sq mi)
- Time zone: UTC+01 (CET)
- Municipalities: 3

Skikda is a district in Skikda Province, Algeria. It was named after its capital, Skikda. The current district chief is Mrs. Bouhmatou Nassima, being one of few administrative divisions of the country ruled by a woman.

== History ==
The modern district has its roots in the colonial arrondissement of Philippeville (Philippeville is the former name of Skikda). Philippeville was first a sous-direction, then a sous-préfecture of the département of Constantine.

== Municipalities ==
The district is further divided into 3 municipalities:

- Skikda
- Hamadi Krouma
- Filfla
