= Oum =

Oum may refer to:

== People ==
- Boun Oum (1911–1980), Laotian prince and politician
- Cam Oum (1849–1908), Laotian leader
- Edouard Oum Ndeki (1976–2009), Cameroonian footballer
- Monty Oum (1981–2015), American animator and writer
- Oum (singer) (born 1978), Moroccan singer
- Oum Chheang Sun (1900–1963), Cambodian politician
- Oum Sang-il (born 1976), South Korean mathematician

== Places ==
=== Inhabited places ===
==== Algeria ====
- Oum Ali District
  - Oum Ali, a town in the district
- Oum Drou, a town
- Oum El Achar, a village
- Oum El Adhaïm District
  - Oum El Adhaim, a town in the district
- Oum El Assel, a town
- Oum El Bouaghi Province
  - Oum El Bouaghi, a municipality in the province
- Oum Laadham, a town
- Oum Ladjoul, a town
- Oum Sahaouine, a village
- Oum Toub District
  - Oum Toub, a town in the district
- Oum Touyour, a town
- Oum Zebed, a village

==== Elsewhere ====
- Oum Avnadech, a village in Mauritania
- Oum Bakul, a village in Sudan
- Oum Dreyga, a town in Western Sahara
- Oum El Abouab, a town in Tunisia
- Oum Hadjer, a city in Chad
- Oum Rabia (commune), a commune in Morocco

=== Other places ===
- Oum ed Diab Formation, a geological feature in Tunisia
- Oum Er-Rbia River, in Morocco
- Oum Lâalag, an oasis in Morocco
- Oum Moung, a temple in Laos

== See also ==
- OUM (disambiguation)
- Um (Korean surname)
