= Boughalboune =

Coordinates: 36.588°N 6.781°E

Boughalboune (Arabic: بوغلبون) is a town in Skikda Province, Algeria on the N3 highway to Skikda on the bank of a tributary of the Oued Ensa River. The topography of the town is [mountainous.

== Climate ==
According to the Köppen–Geiger climate classification, the climate is of the Csa type. The average temperature at El Harrouch is 17.4 °C (63.32°F). It falls on average 704 mm (27.7 in) of rain per year.

The driest month is July with only 5 mm (0.19 in). With an average of 126 mm (4.9 in), January recorded the highest precipitation. With an average temperature of 26.0 °C (78°F), the month of August is the warmest of the year. With an average temperature of 10.0 °C (50°F), the month of January is the coldest of the year.
