= Youcef Zighoud =

Algerian soldier

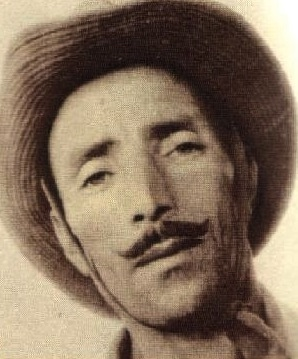
- A portrait of Youcef Zighoud
- Born: February 18, 1921
- Died: September 23, 1956 (aged 35); Sidi Mezghiche, Skikda Province, Algeria
- Cause of death: Killed in action
- Other name: يوسف زيغود
- Known for: Party fighter during the Algerian War

Youcef Zighoud (Arabic: يوسف زيغود, Tamazight: ⵢⵓⵙⴻⴼ ⵣⵉⵖⵓⴷ) February 18, 1921 – September 23, 1956), also known as Colonel Si Ahmed, was an Algerian FLN fighter during the Algerian War of Independence. On August 20, 1955, he planned an attack against the French in Philippeville (currently called Skikda) and its surroundings, which is commonly referred to as the Battle of Philippeville. The attack led to a harsh crackdown and repression by the French government. While numbers are disputed, the conflict resulted in between 1,239 and 12,000 deaths.

Zighoud was killed in Sidi Mezghiche during a clash against the French Army. The town of Zighoud Youcef is named after him.

== Biography ==
Zighoud attended a Qur'anic school after he had left a French primary school.

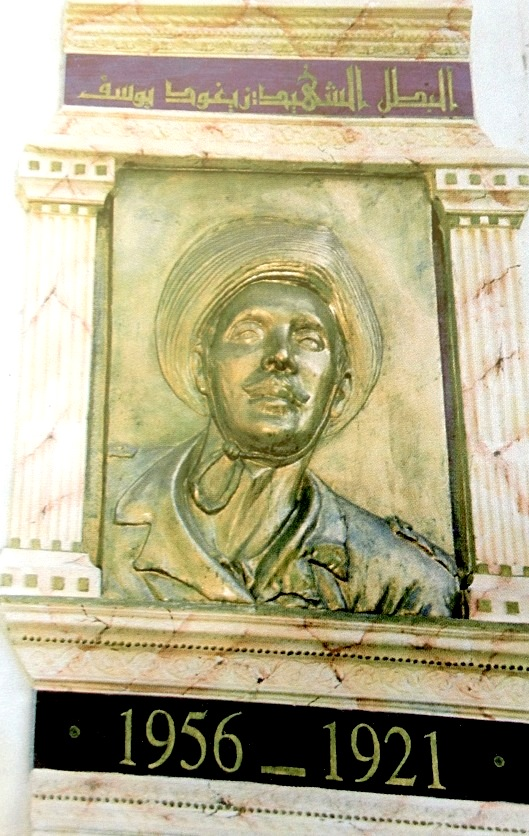
Zighoud Youcef Memorial in Skikda.

At the age of 17, Zighoud joined the Algerian People's Party (PPA) and became a local official in Smendou in 1938. After being elected in the Movement for the Triumph of Democratic Liberties (MTLD) in 1947, he took part in the Special Organization (OS), which was called to prepare all essential requirements for the armed struggle, after the total failure of the peaceful parth. Arrested in 1950 by the French colonial police, which had discovered the (OS), he was charged and thrown in jail in Annaba, but he escaped. He also engaged in the military action of the Revolutionary Committee of Unity and Action (CRUA) from its creation.

On November 1, 1954, he was with Didouche Mourad in the North Constantine area that became Wilaya 2 in the National Liberation Army (ALN). Zighoud took part in the Oued Boukerker battle with Mourad on January 18, 1955, during which Mourad was killed. Zighoud took his place at the head of Wilaya II.

In that role, he organised and directed the famous August 20, 1955 Battle of Philippeville, which was referred to as "the bloodbath of Constantine region" and was firmly condemned by the FLN head command. A year later, on August 20, 1956, he took part in the Congress of Soummam during which all of the revolution's organic and political structures were set up.

Zighoud, who was one of the Congress's founders, was appointed a member of the National Council of the Algerian Revolution (CNRA) and was promoted to colonel of National Liberation Army (ALN) and assumed command of Wilaya II. Soon, he joined again his battle station and started applying the Congress's decisions.

On September 25, 1956, at the age of 35, Zighoud was killed during an explicative and organisational tour of his units by a French Army ambush in Sidi Mezghiche, Skikda Province.

== See also ==
- Declaration of 1 November 1954
