= Le Philippevillois =

- Type: Weekly
- Founded: 1919
- Language: French language
- Headquarters: Philippeville

Le Philippevillois was a French language weekly newspaper published from Philippeville (present-day Skikda), Algeria. It was founded in 1919, and served as the official organ of the municipality. As of 1937, Eugène Hubinger was the director of the newspaper.
