= Ramdane Djamel–Annaba railway =

Railway line in Algeria

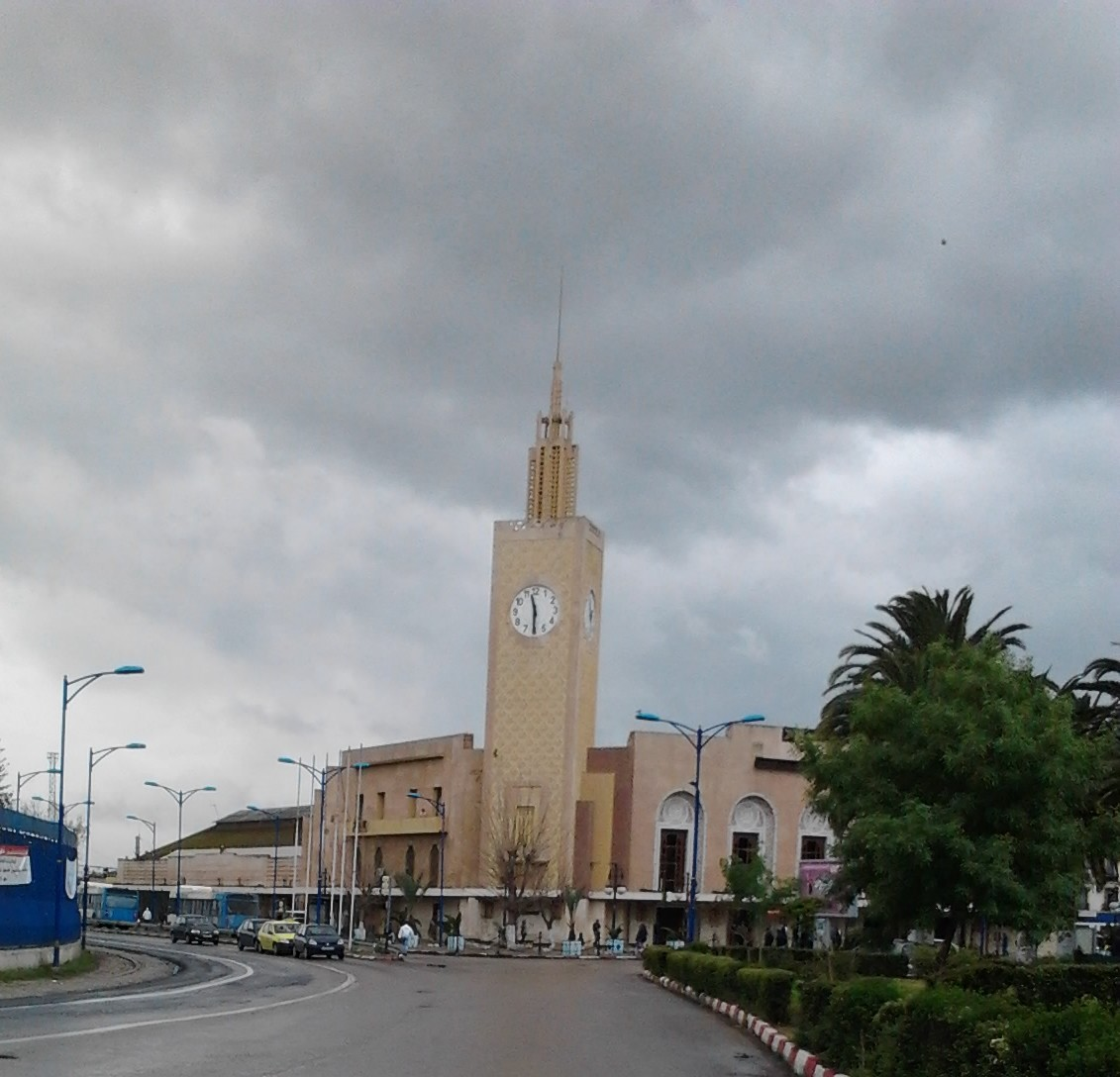
- Annaba station, the eastern terminus of the railway.

Overview
- Stations: 4

Service
- Type: Heavy rail
- System: SNTF

History
- Opened: 1 September 1859
- Last extension: 1904

Technical
- Line length: 96 km (60 mi)
- Number of tracks: Single track
- Track gauge: 1,435 mm (4 ft 8 1/2 in) standard gauge
- Electrification: none
- Operating speed: 45 km/h (28 mph)
Route map
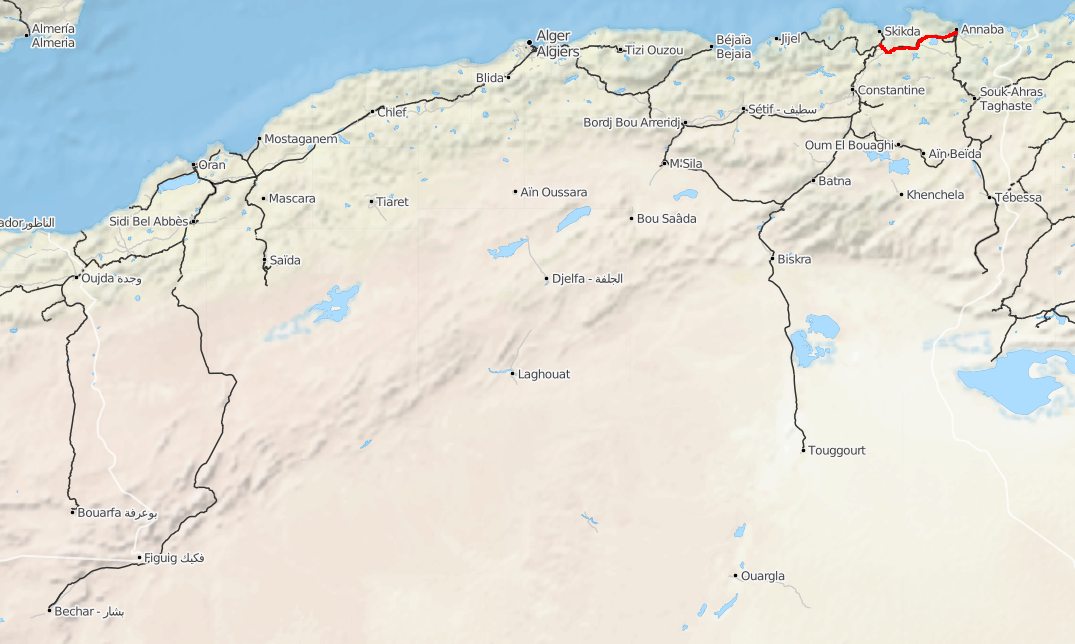

The Ramdane Djamel–Annaba railway is a railway connecting Annaba Province to the Algiers–Skikda railway and the rest of the Algerian rail network. Currently 96 kilometers long, it is the oldest railway in the country.

== History ==
An 11 kilometer segment of the current railway started construction in 1853 and opened on September 1, 1859 for cargo operations in the immediate vicinity of Annaba.

The railway first opened for passenger service in 1885 and had all its segments joined in 1904. Since 2006, the line is being upgraded by the National Company for Rail Transport.

Double-tracking work commenced in 2006 in order to facilitate long-distance travel connecting with the Algiers–Skikda railway and includes 27 kilometers of new alignment, two tunnels measuring a total of 2 kilometers, and station reconstruction in the towns of Azzaba and Berrahal. The work is being performed by Obrascón Huarte Lain for approximately €200 million.

== Description ==
The railway is single-track and not electrified. It has a total of four stations: Annaba, Berrahal, Azzaba, and Ramdane Djamel. Services average 40-50 km/h.

== Services ==
One night train connects Algiers station to Annaba, taking 10 hours over 630 kilometers using the Algiers–Skikda railway and the Ramdane Djamel–Annaba railway. Only freight service operates between Annaba and Skikda.
