= Constantinois =

Cultural and historical region of Northern Africa

Coordinates: 36°22′4.2″N 6°38′22.3″E

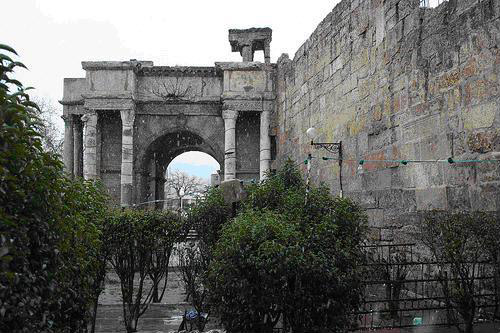
Gate of Caracalla in Tebessa, Tébessa Province.

Constantinois is a cultural and historical region of the Maghreb, located in northeastern Algeria.

== Geography ==
The region corresponds roughly to seven contemporary wilayas: Constantine Province, Annaba Province, Guelma Province, Skikda Province, Souk Ahras Province, Mila Province, and El Tarf Province.

The chief city of the region is Constantine.

=== Topography ===
A large part of Constantinois is dominated by mountain ranges, including the:

- Babor Mountains
- Constantine Mountains
- Collo Massif

== See also ==
- Constantine department
- Ifriqiya — medieval period
- Battle of Philippeville
- Kabyles Hadra
