= University of Skikda =

University in Skikda, Algeria

Coordinates: 36.8492°N 6.8906°E

- Université of 20 août 1955 of Skikda (French)
- Type: Public
- Established: 2001
- Location: Skikda, Algeria
- Campus: Urban
- Nickname: USKIKDA
- Website: University website

The Université of 20 août 1955 of Skikda is a university located in Skikda, Algeria. The date references the Battle of Philippeville.

The University of Skikda was created by Executive Decree No. 01/272 in 2001.

== See also ==
- List of universities in Algeria
