= Kabyles Hadra =

Ethnic group in North Constantine, Algeria

The Kabyles Hadra or Kabyles el Hadra are the group of Arabic-speaking mountain dwellers of North Constantine who speak a sedentary Arabic dialect. The region of the Kabyles Hadara corresponds to eastern Kabylia or the land of the Kutama Berbers who have become Arabized. They are therefore found throughout Jijel Province, northern Mila Province, and western Skikda Province.

== Etymology ==
Kabaile El Had'ra was originally the name given to the Arabized Berber mountain people of North Constantine who had abandoned mountain life to settle in the plains and in the cities.

As Maghreb cities developed and became Arabized, they referred to the hinterland as "qbail," meaning "tribe". Strangely, the term "Had'ra" seems to have originally had the opposite connotation. According to Mármol, it was used in the 16th century "among the tribes, among the Kbail" to designate, with a disdainful connotation, the Arabs "who live in African cities [and who] are commonly called Hadara, that is to say, courtiers [urbanized] and mostly involved in trade [commerce]". The historian Moussa Lakbal offers an explanation that supports what Marmol writes; according to him, the neologism "Kabaile El Had'ra" was coined to designate the descendants of the Kutama tribes who abandoned mountain life to settle in the plains and cities.

In local tradition, the name used to designate the Arabic-speaking tribes of northern Constantine seems to have been "Qabail El Had'ra", as opposed to the "Qabail En-nighass" or Qabail (Berber-speaking tribes).

Hadra would come from the Arabic word hadara which means civilization or urbanity; it would also have been used to designate the Arabs who remain in the cities of the Maghreb and who are called Hadara, that is to say courtiers (urbanized).

== Society ==
The region of the Kabaile El Had'ra corresponds to that of the Kutama Berbers who have become Arabized. According to Jean Morizot, the name Qabail El Had'ra was accepted by the inhabitants themselves.

The term is thought to come from the Arabic word hadara (civilization, urbanity). It was used in Constantine until the end of the 19th century to distinguish the Kabyles of the Djurdjura or of northern Constantine.

In the 19th century, attempts were made to identify characteristics of eastern Kabylia: independence from Turkish rule, the use of a particular Arabic, dwellings in clearings with an absence of "block" villages, and fruit tree cultivation.

== Dialectology ==
The linguistic areas of eastern Algeria and their evolution.

Eastern Kabylia has been subject to Arabization since the medieval period, but the Kabyle language experienced a significant decline between 1886 and 1913 due to French colonization. Regarding the Arabic dialect of eastern Kabylia, the weakening of articulatory tension is generally attributed to the influence of the Berber substrate. In this regard, Philippe Marçais emphasizes that "the Arabic speaker of eastern Kabylia tends to relax articulatory tension, to open their mouth where it was initially closed, and consequently to spirantize former plosives." However, since spirantization constitutes one of the phonetic characteristics of the Berber dialects of the North, in particular according to André Basset, it is difficult not to see this as the direct effect of Berber influence. The Kabyle language spoken in Lower Kabylia, in contrast to that of Greater Kabylia (which has preserved Berber), is the result of linguistic sedimentation, composed of an initial Berber layer, upon which a second Berber-Arabic layer and a third Arabic layer were superimposed, thus forming a complex picture resulting from contact between populations from different backgrounds.

The Arabic spoken in Jijel, which Philippe Marçais rightly considers "one of the types furthest removed from that on which the literary language is based," is distinguished precisely by this distance. According to the author, this is attributable to the influence of the Berber substrate, which, in many cases, constitutes the direct cause of a number of innovations specific to this dialect. The particularity of the Jijel dialect is thus explained by the fact that it probably represents one of the Arabic dialects most profoundly marked by the influence of the Berber substrate. From a grammatical point of view, we note certain structures borrowed from Berbers, particularly outside the city of Jijel, in the mountains, such as plurals with the suffix -en: "aqtot" (cat) becomes "aqtoten", "aurez" (heel) becomes "awerzen", "aɣrum" (bread) becomes "aɣrumen" and "aɣunga" (spoon) becomes "iɣengiwen". To form a name of profession, the dialect of Jijel, like some in Morocco, frames a root with the complex Berber morpheme "ta-. .. t": taserrâjt (saddlery), taxerraz(e)t (shoemaking), tabennay(e)t (masonry), tabeqqal(e)t (trade), taberrah(e)t (public crier's profession).

== Bibliography ==
- Carlier, Omar (1995). Entre Nation et Jihad: histoire sociale des radicalismes algériens (in French). Presses de la Fondation nationale des sciences politiques. ISBN 978-2-7246-0671-3.
- Kitouni, Housni (2013). La Kabylie Orientale dans l'histoire (in French). Paris: L'Harmattan.
- Morizot, Jean (2001). Les Kabyles: propos d'un témoin (in French). Harmattan. ISBN 978-2-7475-1027-1.
