= List of railway lines in Algeria =

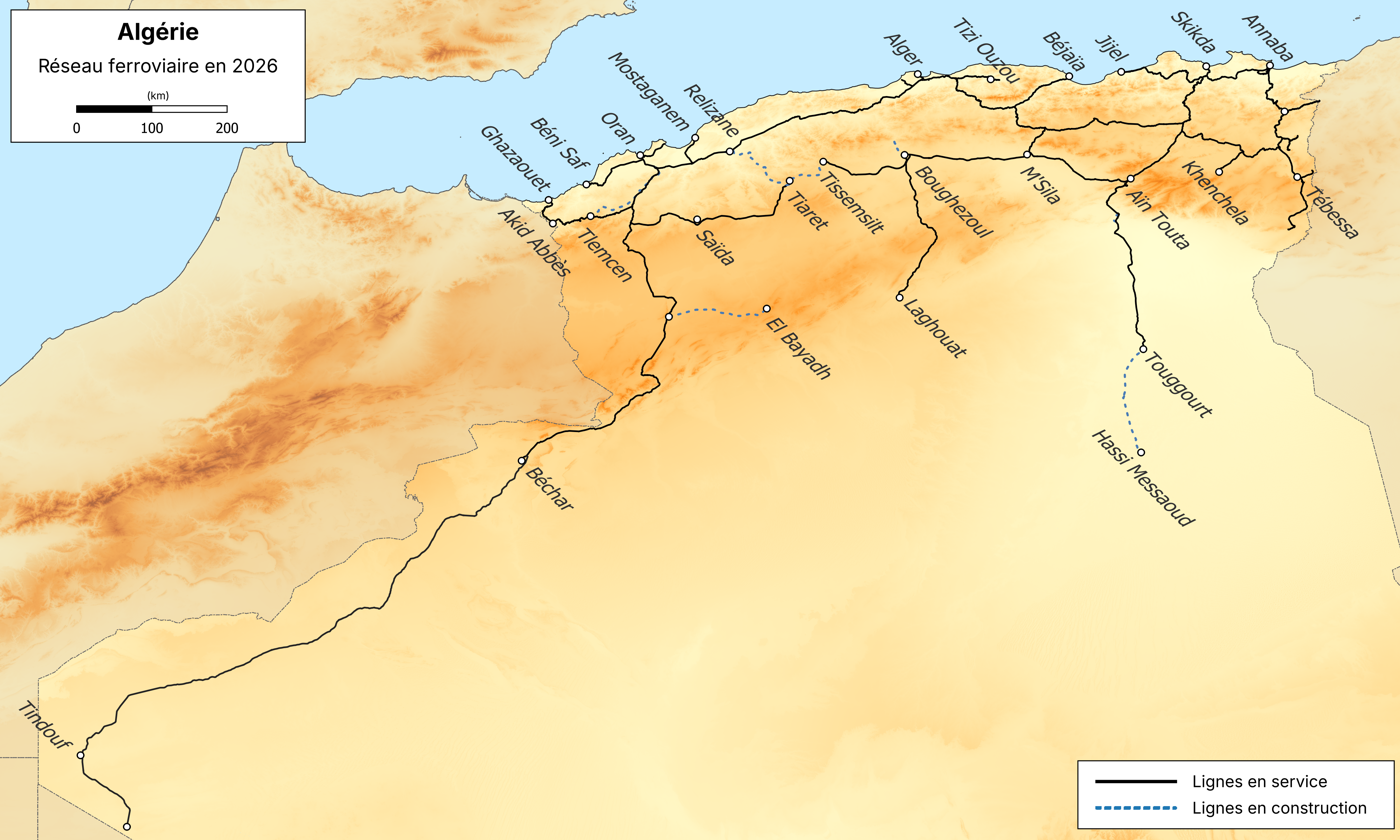
Active railroads of Algeria

The following is a non-exhaustive list of railways operating in Algeria with opening dates if available. The classifications of railways into long-distance and regional railways correspond to SNTF categories.

== Northern Algeria ==
=== Long-distance lines ===
- Algiers–Oran railway (1871)
- Algiers–Skikda railway (1886)

=== Regional lines ===
- Béni Mansour–Bejaïa railway (1889)
- Bordj Bou Arreridj–M'Sila railway (2010)
- Tabia–Akid Abbes railway (1916)
- Akid Abbes–Ghazaouet railway (1936)
- Es Senia–Béni Saf railway (1885; rebuilt 1985–2015)
- Thénia–Oued Aïssi railway (1888; rebuilt 2010)
- Ramdane Djamel–Annaba railway (1904)
- Ramdane Djamel–Jijel railway (1990)
- Inactive since 26/12/1996: Mohammadia–Mostaganem railway (1879; rebuilt 1908)

== Vertical (north-south) lines ==
- Annaba–Djebel Onk railway (1888; rebuilt 1966)
- Oued Tlelat–Béchar railway (1906; rebuilt 2010)
- El Guerrah–Touggourt railway (1914)
- Inactive, Oran–Kenadsa railway
- Boughezoul–Laghouat railway (2023)
- Béchar–Gara Djebilet railway (2026)

== High Plateau lines ==
- High Plateau railway

=== Regional lines ===
- Aïn M'lila–El Aouinet railway (2009)
- Aïn Touta–M'Sila railway (2009)
- Souk Ahras–Tunisian frontier railway

== Commuter rail ==
=== Algiers Province ===
- Birtouta–Zéralda railway

=== Oran Province ===
- Oran–Arzew railway
