= OUM =

OUM may refer to:

- Oracle Unified Method
- Ovonic Unified Memory
- Open University of Mauritius
- Open University Malaysia
- Oxford University Museum of Natural History

== See also ==
- Oum (disambiguation)
