= Collo Massif =

Massif in Algeria

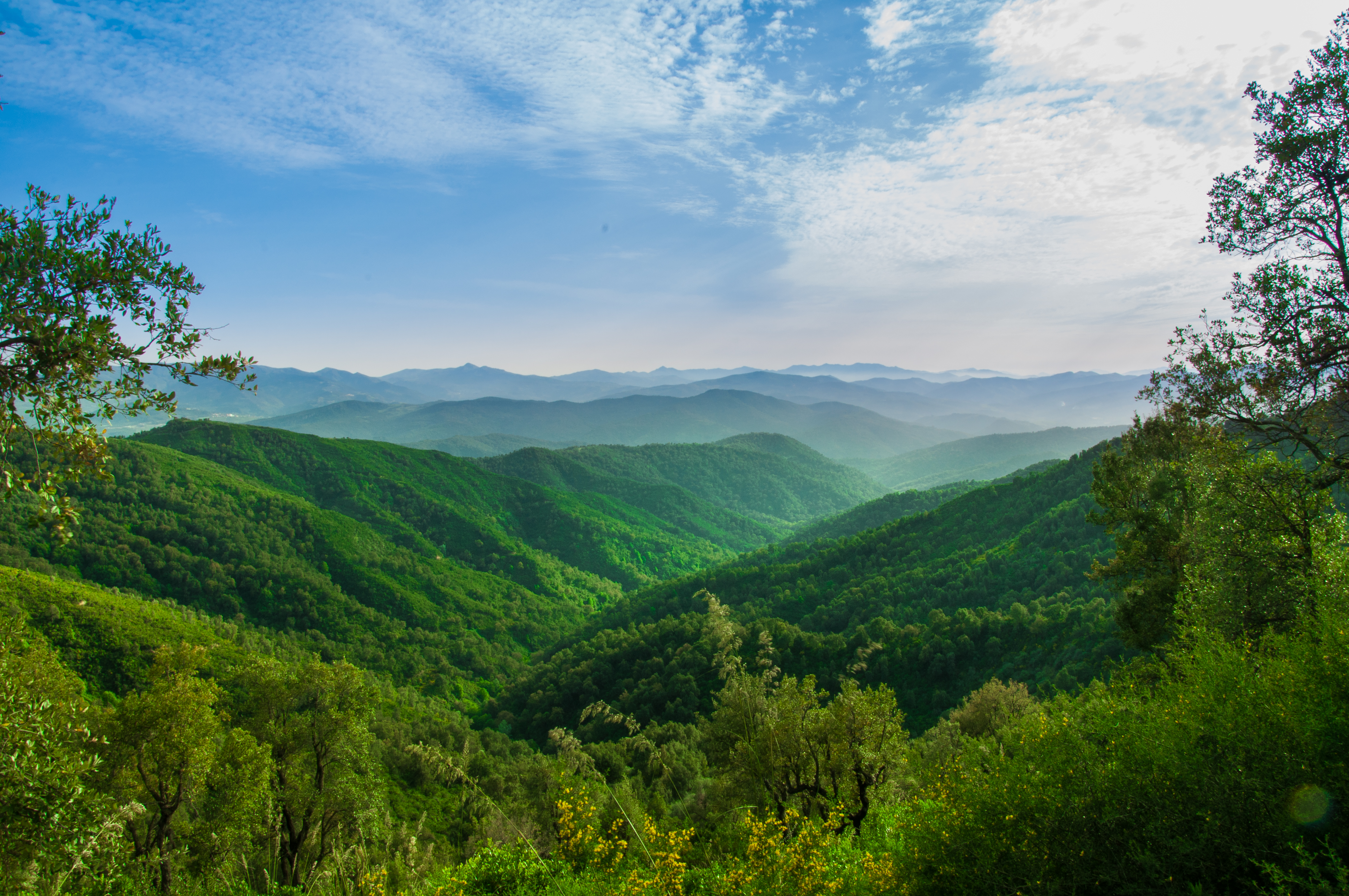

Highest point
- Peak: el Goufi
- Elevation: 1,183 m (3,881 ft)
- Coordinates: 37°00′N 6°25′E

Geography
- Location within Algeria Location within Mediterranean
- Country: Algeria
- Region(s): Skikda, Jijel
- Parent range: Tell Atlas

The Collo massif, sometimes called Kabylie de Collo, is a mountainous forest massif of Algeria located in the north-east of the country and constituting part of the Tell Atlas.

== Geography ==
Geographers distinguish several "Kabylies": Great Kabylie, Small Kabylie and Kabylie of Collo or Numidic Kabylies. The latter, located west of Annaba and north of Constantinois, is the most watered region of Algeria, with more than 1,200 millimetres (47 in) per year. The average annual rainfall on el Goufi mountain, west of Collo, is 1,800 mm (71 in). The climate is humid Mediterranean.

The Collo Massif, a segment of the Tell Atlas, is heavily forested. Lying between the Skikda Valley in the east and the Rhumel River in the west and strongly advancing towards the Mediterranean Sea: the Cap Bougaroûn, is the northernmost point of Algeria.

It consists of small mountains of modest altitude culminating between 900 and 980 m (2,950 and 3,220 ft) and dominated by cork oak, as well as the replanting of maritime pines which provide 30% of national cork production. Several wadis in the region have their source there: Rhummel, Oued-el-Kebir and Saf-Saf, forests are lined with fertile plains.

== Population ==
The population of the Collo massif was a peasant society in the full sense of the term: a complete sedentary lifestyle, a strong attachment to the land, a careful development. Its social structure was strong, governed by customary rules, the land was privatized with status melk.

The Collo massif is, like the Small Kabylie and the Edough, populated by Arabized Berbers long-time but leading a sedentary life. The mountain people practice cattle breeding. Goats and sheep provided supplements (milk, flesh and hair) to poor agriculture. Demographic densities are significantly lower than those of the Grande and Petite Kabylies.
