= Ramdane Djamel =

Ramdane Djamel ex Saint Charles
- Commune and town

- Location within Algeria
- Coordinates: 36.7552525°N 6.8927193°E
- Country: Algeria
- Province: Skikda Province
- Time zone: UTC+1 (CET)
- Postal code: 21425

Ramdane Djamel is a town and commune in Skikda Province in north-eastern Algeria.

The town is home to football club WA Ramdane Djamel, which currently plays in the Ligue Nationale du Football Amateur. Ramdane Djamel is an important railway junction where the mainline Algiers–Skikda railway connects to the Ramdane Djamel–Annaba railway as well as to the Ramdane Djamel–Jijel railway.

== Geography ==
=== Localisation ===
The commune of Ramdane Djamel is located in the center of the Skikda Province, 17 km south of Skikda crossed by the RN3.

=== Relief, geology, hydrography ===
The commune is located in the heart of the valley of the Safsaf wadi which crosses it from south to north. Two tributaries meet there, Oued Hadarataz and Oued Zerga.

It is bordered to the east by the Kef Serrak massif

=== Transportation ===
It is crossed by the RN3, RN44AA and 44AC.

It is a railway junction, since it is served by a station that links the lines of Algiers to Skikda and Ramdane Djamel to Annaba. Finally a third line from Ramdane Djamel to Jijel starts there 4 km further south.

=== Villages, hamlets and localities ===
The capital agglomeration is the city of Ramdane Djamel. There is a secondary settlement, Staiha.

Hamlets: El-Dis, El Magen

== History ==
The region is located on the Roman road from Cirta to Rusicade, 4 km from the location of the current village, at the level of the hamlet of El-Dis. Many Roman remains have been found there.

In the 15th century, a village called Oued Zerga was erected by the Beni Mehenna.

In 1838 after the conquest of Constantine, several French generals went there to go down to Stora and built forts there. The resistance is led by Si Zerdoud who will be killed on March 3, 1842. From 1845, some colonial houses are installed in the place of the village Oued Zerga which will be renamed Saint Charles on April 6, 1847. In 1861 the village is erected as a commune full exercise.

In 1963, the commune of Beni Bechir was merged with that of Saint Charles, which took the name of Ramdane Djamel in 1965. Beni Bechir was again detached from the commune in 1984.
