= Essebt =

Essebt السبت Es Sebt
- Commune and town

- Location within Algeria
- Coordinates: 36.6623603°N 7.0774269°E
- Country: Algeria
- Province: Skikda Province
- District: Azzaba District

Population (2008)
  - Total: 15,266
- Time zone: UTC+1 (CET)

Essebt is a town and commune in Skikda Province in north-eastern Algeria.
