= Maassluis (ship) =

History
- Name: Maassluis
- Owner: Nedlloyd Bulk BV (1982-1989)
- Builder: Van der Giessen-de Noord, Netherlands
- Launched: 1982
- Christened: Mrs. Wijkstra-Vellinga
- In service: 1982
- Out of service: Lost in the night of 14 to 15 February 1989
- Identification: Call sign: PFRR; IMO number: 8010518
- Fate: Lost at Skikda, Algeria

General characteristics
- Type: Chemical tanker
- Tonnage: 37,250 DWT
- Length: 172.23 m (565 ft 1 in)
- Beam: 32.29 m (105 ft 11 in)
- Speed: 15 knots (28 km/h; 17 mph)
- Crew: 29

MV Maassluis was a chemical tanker owned by the Dutch shipping-company Nedlloyd. On 15 February 1989 the ship was lost in heavy weather near the port of Skikda, Algeria. Two sailors, who were swept overboard when they tried to work on the anchor, survived the incident. The other 27 crew were killed. For his actions in trying to rescue the ship and crew, first officer Peter Korsen was posthumously promoted to captain. The shipwreck was the single most serious shipping disaster for a Dutch-flagged vessel since the Second World War.

== Wreck ==
The ship was empty and with a minimum amount of ballast lie for anchor for the port of Skikda when bad weather and high winds were expected. When the wind reached force 10 on the Beaufort scale the ship pulled loose from her anchors and smashed against the piers of the harbour.

As Maassluis was expected to enter the port of Skikda the next day to load the captain dropped her anchor very close to the head of the pier of the port. Also because she would enter the port the next morning to load up the ship was empty and her ballast tanks were also (nearly) empty. During the evening a fierce storm broke out and waves reached a height of 9 to 12 metres (30 to 39 ft). The wind reached a force of 10 Beaufort and was directed inland.

Around 23:00 hours the captain, with help from the first officer, started the engines and tried to sail free from the pierhead using full power. Two sailors were sent forward to raise the anchor so the ship would be able to sail away from the shore. These two sailors were swept overboard by the wind and waves but managed to reach the shore with minor wounds. These two sailors were the only survivors of the disaster. Despite using full engine-power the Maassluis was not able to move free from the piers and around 23:30 the ship came into contact with the piers and broke up. Of the 27 people that lost their live the remains of only four were recovered. The other 23 were never found.
