= Oum Toub District =

Coordinates: 36.6833°N 6.5667°E

- District
- Country: Algeria
- Province: Skikda Province
- Time zone: UTC+1 (CET)

Oum Toub District is a district of Skikda Province, Algeria.

The district is further divided into 1 municipalities:

- Oum Toub
