= Benazouz =

Coordinates: 36°27′36″N 7°07′48″E

- Commune and town
- Interactive map of Benazouz
- Country: Algeria
- Province: Skikda Province
- Time zone: UTC+1 (CET)

Benazouz is a town and commune in Skikda Province in north-eastern Algeria.
