= Oued Z'hor =

Coordinates: 35°32′N 2°10′E

- Commune and town
- Interactive map of Oued Z'hor
- Country: Algeria
- Province: Skikda Province
- Time zone: UTC+1 (CET)

Oued Z'hor is a town and commune in Skikda Province in north-eastern Algeria.
