= Sidi Mezghiche =

Coordinates: 36°41′N 6°43′E

- Commune and town
- Interactive map of Sidi Mezghiche
- Country: Algeria
- Province: Skikda Province
- Time zone: UTC+1 (CET)

Sidi Mezghiche is a town and commune in Skikda Province in north-eastern Algeria. FLN fighter Youcef Zighoud was killed during an ambush in Sidi Mezghiche on September 25, 1956.
