= Bouchtata =

- Commune and town

- Location within Algeria
- Country: Algeria
- Province: Skikda Province
- Time zone: UTC+1 (CET)

Bouchtata is a town and commune in Skikda Province in north-eastern Algeria.
