= Tamalous =

Tamalous تمالوس
- Commune and town
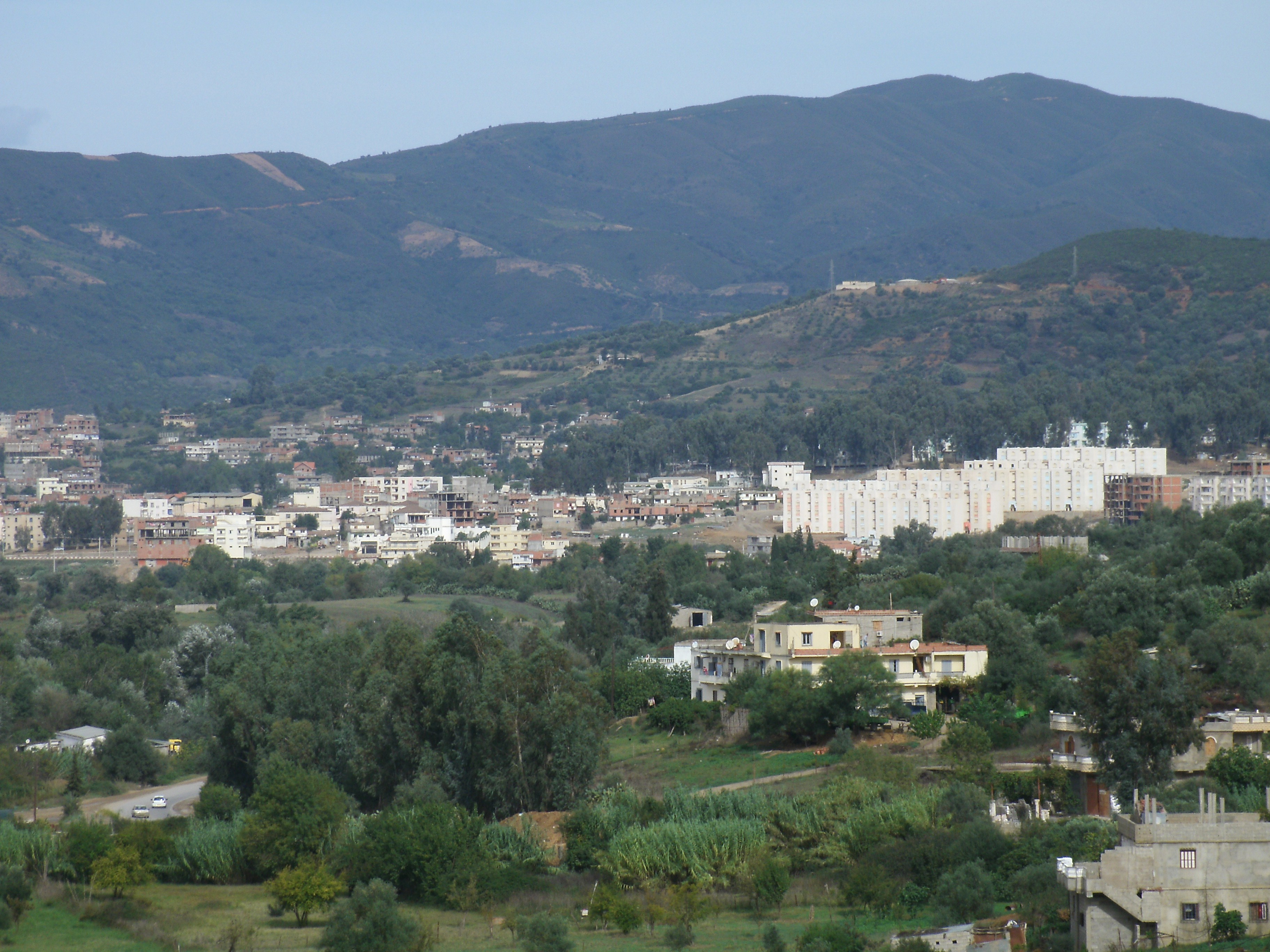

- Location within Algeria
- Coordinates: 36°50′10″N 6°38′30″E
- Country: Algeria
- Province: Skikda Province

Area
  - Total: 142.12 sq mi (368.09 km^{2})

Population (2008)
  - Total: 51,262
- Time zone: UTC+1 (CET)
- Postal code: 21005

Tamalous (Arabic: تمالوس, romanized: Tamālūs) is a town and commune in Skikda Province in north-eastern Algeria. According to the 2008 census it has a population of 23,728.

== Geography ==
=== Climate ===
The climate is warm and temperate in Tamalous. There is more rainfall in the winter than in the summer. The Köppen-Geiger climate classification is Csa. The average annual temperature is 62.7 °F (17.1 °C). The annual rainfall is 25.66 inches (652 mm).

Climate data for Tamalous, Skikda (1991-2021 normals)
Month	Jan	Feb	Mar	Apr	May	Jun	Jul	Aug	Sep	Oct	Nov	Dec	Year
Mean daily maximum °F (°C)	56.8 (13.8)	57.3 (14.1)	62.7 (17.1)	67.4 (19.7)	73.9 (23.3)	82.7 (28.2)	89.7 (32.1)	90 (32)	82.4 (28.0)	76.3 (24.6)	65.1 (18.4)	58.8 (14.9)	71.9 (22.2)
Daily mean °F (°C)	48.7 (9.3)	48.9 (9.4)	53.5 (11.9)	58.1 (14.5)	64.5 (18.1)	72.7 (22.6)	78.7 (25.9)	79 (26)	73.1 (22.8)	67 (19)	57 (14)	50.9 (10.5)	62.7 (17.0)
Mean daily minimum °F (°C)	41.5 (5.3)	41.1 (5.1)	44.8 (7.1)	49 (9)	55 (13)	62.4 (16.9)	68 (20)	69.1 (20.6)	65.1 (18.4)	59.1 (15.1)	49.9 (9.9)	44 (7)	54.1 (12.3)
Average precipitation inches (mm)	3.3 (84)	3.0 (77)	2.9 (73)	2.6 (66)	2.0 (50)	0.5 (13)	0.2 (4)	0.6 (16)	1.6 (41)	2.4 (61)	3.2 (81)	3.4 (86)	25.7 (652)
Average precipitation days	9	8	8	8	5	2	1	3	6	7	9	8	74
Average relative humidity (%)	80	78	77	76	73	64	58	60	68	72	76	79	72
Mean daily sunshine hours	6.3	6.9	8.0	9.2	10.5	12.0	12.4	11.3	9.6	8.4	7.0	6.3	9.0
Source: climate-data.org

== Demographics ==
Historical population
Year	1998	2008
Pop.	16,017	23,728
±%	—	+48.1%
Source: www.citypopulation.de
