= Beni Zid =

Coordinates: 36°48′29″N 6°30′20″E

- Commune and town
- Interactive map of Beni Zid
- Country: Algeria
- Province: Skikda Province
- Time zone: UTC+1 (CET)

Beni Zid is a town and commune in Skikda Province in north-eastern Algeria.
