= El Hadaik =

Coordinates: 36.8256°N 6.8883°E

- Commune and town
- Interactive map of El Hadaik
- Country: Algeria
- Province: Skikda Province
- Time zone: UTC+1 (CET)

El Hadaik is a town and commune in Skikda Province in north-eastern Algeria.
