= Zerdazas =

Coordinates: 36.6288°N 6.8633°E

- Commune and town
- Interactive map of Zerdazas
- Country: Algeria
- Province: Skikda Province
- Time zone: UTC+1 (CET)

Zerdazas is a town and commune in Skikda Province in north-eastern Algeria.
