= Kheneg Mayoum =

Coordinates: 37°00′30″N 6°17′03″E

- Commune and town
- Interactive map of Kheneg Mayoum
- Country: Algeria
- Province: Skikda Province
- Time zone: UTC+1 (CET)

Kheneg Mayoum is a town and commune in Skikda Province in north-eastern Algeria.
