= Aïn Charchar =

Aïn Charchar عين شرشار
- Commune and town
- Location of Aïn Charchar within Skikda Province

- Location of Aïn Charchar within Algeria
- Coordinates: 36°43′52″N 7°13′11″E
- Country: Algeria
- Province: Skikda Province
- Time zone: UTC+1 (CET)
- Postal code: 21006
- ISO 3166 code: DZ-21

Aïn Charchar (Arabic: عين شرشار, romanized: ʿAyn Šaršār) is a town and commune in Skikda Province in north-eastern Algeria.

== Climate ==
Aïn Cherchar's climate is classified as warm and temperate. The winter months are much rainier than the summer months. According to the Köppen Climate Classification system, this climate is classified as "Csa". The average annual temperature is 63.3 °F (17.4 °C), and precipitation is about 24.72 inches (628 mm) per year.

Climate data for Aïn Charchar, Skikda (1991–2021 normals)
| Month | Jan | Feb | Mar | Apr | May | Jun | Jul | Aug | Sep | Oct | Nov | Dec | Year |
|---|---|---|---|---|---|---|---|---|---|---|---|---|---|
| Mean daily maximum °F | 57.6 | 58.2 | 63.9 | 69.1 | 76 | 85.3 | 92.1 | 92 | 84 | 77.6 | 66.2 | 59.6 | 73.5 |
| Daily mean °F | 49.1 | 49.4 | 54.1 | 58.9 | 65.4 | 73.6 | 79.6 | 79.7 | 73.5 | 67.3 | 57.5 | 51.3 | 63.3 |
| Mean daily minimum °F | 41.9 | 41.6 | 45.3 | 49.2 | 54.9 | 61.7 | 67.2 | 68.2 | 64.4 | 58.7 | 50.2 | 44.3 | 54.0 |
| Average precipitation inches | 3.2 | 2.9 | 2.8 | 2.5 | 1.8 | 0.6 | 0.1 | 0.6 | 1.6 | 2.4 | 3.2 | 3.1 | 24.8 |
| Mean daily maximum °C | 14.2 | 14.6 | 17.7 | 20.6 | 24 | 29.6 | 33.4 | 33 | 29 | 25.3 | 19.0 | 15.3 | 23.0 |
| Daily mean °C | 9.5 | 9.7 | 12.3 | 14.9 | 18.6 | 23.1 | 26.4 | 26.5 | 23.1 | 19.6 | 14.2 | 10.7 | 17.4 |
| Mean daily minimum °C | 5.5 | 5.3 | 7.4 | 9.6 | 12.7 | 16.5 | 19.6 | 20.1 | 18.0 | 14.8 | 10.1 | 6.8 | 12.2 |
| Average precipitation mm | 81 | 73 | 70 | 63 | 46 | 14 | 3 | 15 | 40 | 62 | 81 | 80 | 628 |
| Average precipitation days | 9 | 8 | 7 | 7 | 5 | 2 | 1 | 2 | 6 | 7 | 9 | 8 | 71 |
| Average relative humidity (%) | 75 | 74 | 73 | 71 | 67 | 57 | 52 | 54 | 63 | 67 | 71 | 74 | 67 |
| Mean daily sunshine hours | 6.4 | 7.2 | 8.2 | 9.4 | 10.7 | 12.2 | 12.5 | 11.5 | 9.8 | 8.5 | 7.2 | 6.5 | 9.2 |
Source: climate-data.org
