= Ouldja Boulballout =

Ouldja Boulballout الولجة بوالبلوط
- Commune and town
- Commune location in Skikda Province.

- Location within Algeria
- Coordinates: 36°47′10″N 6°22′23″E
- Country: Algeria
- Province: Skikda Province

Population (2008)
  - Total: 4,488
- Time zone: UTC+1 (CET)

Ouldja Boulballout is a town and commune in Skikda Province in north-eastern Algeria.

As of 2008 census, the estimated population is 4,488.
