= El Ghedir =

- Commune and town
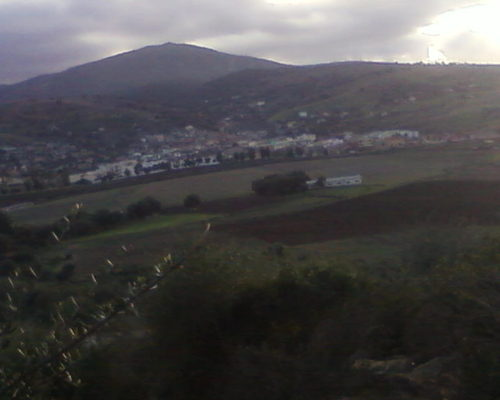

- Location within province

- Location within Algeria
- Coordinates: 36°41′18″N 06°58′40″E
- Country: Algeria
- Province: Skikda Province
- Time zone: UTC+1 (CET)

El Ghedir is a town and commune in Skikda Province in north-eastern Algeria.
