= Salah Bouchaour =

Coordinates: 36°42′N 6°51′E

- Commune and town
- Interactive map of Salah Bouchaour
- Country: Algeria
- Province: Skikda Province
- Time zone: UTC+1 (CET)

Salah Bouchaour is a town and commune in Skikda Province in north-eastern Algeria.
