= Kerkera =

Coordinates: 36°56′N 6°35′E

- Commune and town
- Interactive map of Kerkera
- Country: Algeria
- Province: Skikda Province
- Time zone: UTC+1 (CET)

Kerkera is a town and commune in Skikda Province in north-eastern Algeria.
