= Emdjez Edchich =

Coordinates: 36°42′13″N 6°51′23″E

- Commune and town
- Interactive map of Emdjez Edchich
- Country: Algeria
- Province: Skikda Province
- Time zone: UTC+1 (CET)

Emdjez Edchich is a town and commune in Skikda Province in north-eastern Algeria.
