= El Harrouch =

El Harrouch الحروش
- Commune and town
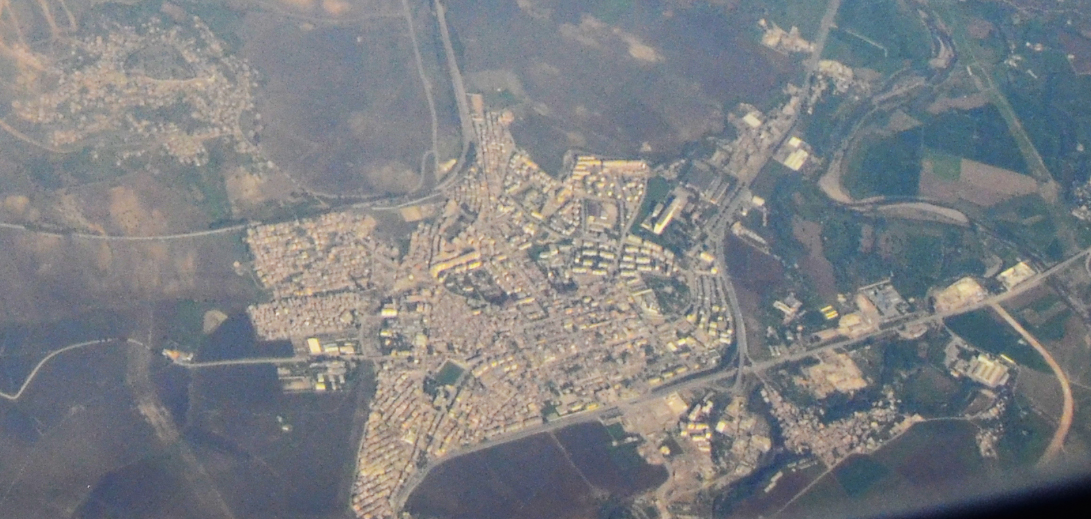
- El Harrouch from air
- Nickname: Meslen el-kebch
- Coordinates: 36°39′11″N 6°50′11″E
- Country: Algeria
- Province: Skikda Province

Population (2008)
  - Total: 33,085
- Time zone: UTC+1 (CET)

El Harrouch is a town and commune in Skikda Province in north-eastern Algeria. It is located on the main N3 road south of Skikda and north of Constantine.

== Demographics ==
The town of El Harrouch had a population of about 48,994 people at the 2008 General Census of Population and Housing (GCPH), an area of about 101 km^{2}, with a density of around 485 inhabitants per kilometers squared. and an urbanization rate of 67.7%.

== Climate ==
The summer and winter seasons are well defined. Rains are less important in summer than they are in winter. According to the Köppen-Geiger classification, the climate is of the Csa type. The average temperature at El Harrouch is 17.4 °C. It falls on average 704 mm of rain per year.

The driest month is July with only 5 mm. With an average of 126 mm, January recorded the highest precipitation. With an average temperature of 26.0 °C, the month of August is the warmest of the year. With an average temperature of 10.0 °C, the month of January is the coldest of the year.

== History ==
The town was going to be named "Meslen el-kebch" (spine sheep) but the notable of the city decided to not adopt it, concerning the current name of the city in base it's el arrouche العروش which in some sorts refers to tribes .

Located halfway between the ancient Cirta (Constantine) and the ancient Skikda, the history of El Harrouch remains strongly linked to the two major urban centers. There is however very little information about the area before the Roman occupation, though pre Roman tombstones, shine some light on that period.

When the French troops arrived in El Harrouch, the remains of the Roman road from Stora to Cirta were still visible and usable. It was by following this ribbon of stones that the battalions arrived on the coast. In 1838, the first military detachments settled permanently in El Harrouch where four bastions, ensured the defense of the camp. The first settlers arrived soon after.

Twice the Government had to repopulate this settlement center, the colonists having been decimated by cholera and earthquakes. The settlement of El Harrouch was mainly Belgian and German families. The commune of El Harrouch was created by decree of 28 August 1881.

Ali Kafi, Algerian President (1992–1994), and the historian Mohamed Harbi were born in the town, and Khaled el-Hassani ben el-Hashemi was married there.
