= Kanoua =

- Commune and town
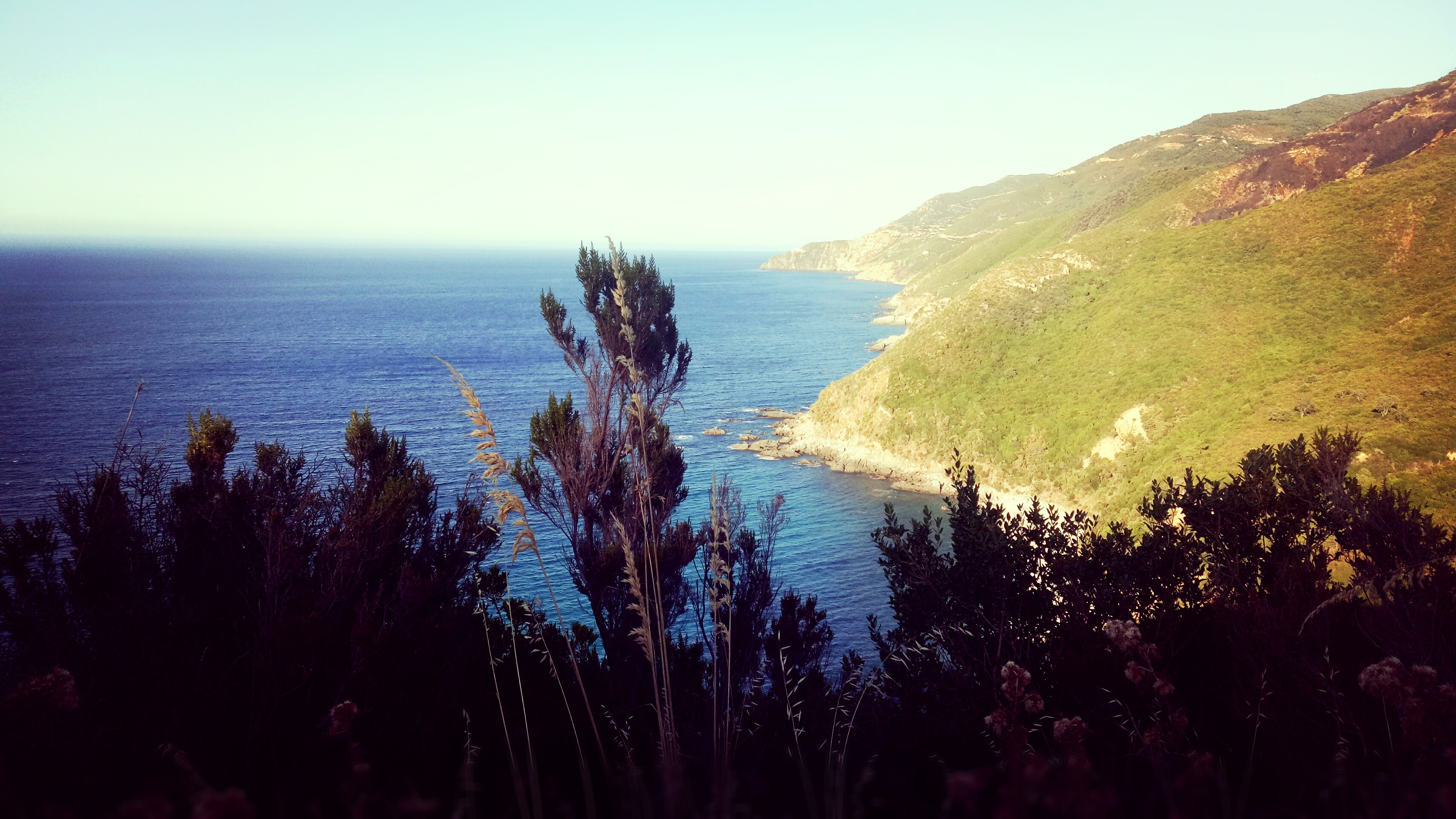

- Localisation of commune in Wilayah.

- Location of Kanoua in Algeria
- Coordinates: 37°03′N 6°24′E
- Country: Algeria
- Province: Skikda Province
- Time zone: UTC+01:00 (CET)

Kanoua is a town and commune in Skikda Province in north-eastern Algeria.
