= Bin El Ouiden =

Bir El Ouiden
- Commune and town

- Location within Algeria
- Coordinates: 36°48′28″N 6°33′56″E
- Country: Algeria
- Province: Skikda Province
- Time zone: UTC+1 (CET)

Bir El Ouiden is a town and commune in Skikda Province in north-eastern Algeria. In April 2008 it had a census population of 21,629 inhabitants.
