= Ouled Hbaba =

Coordinates: 36°30′12″N 6°57′27″E

- Commune and town
- Interactive map of Ouled Hbaba
- Country: Algeria
- Province: Skikda Province

Population (1998)
  - Total: 8,369
- Time zone: UTC+1 (CET)

Ouled Hbaba is a town and commune in Skikda Province in north-eastern Algeria.
