= Algiers–Skikda railway =

Railway line in Algeria

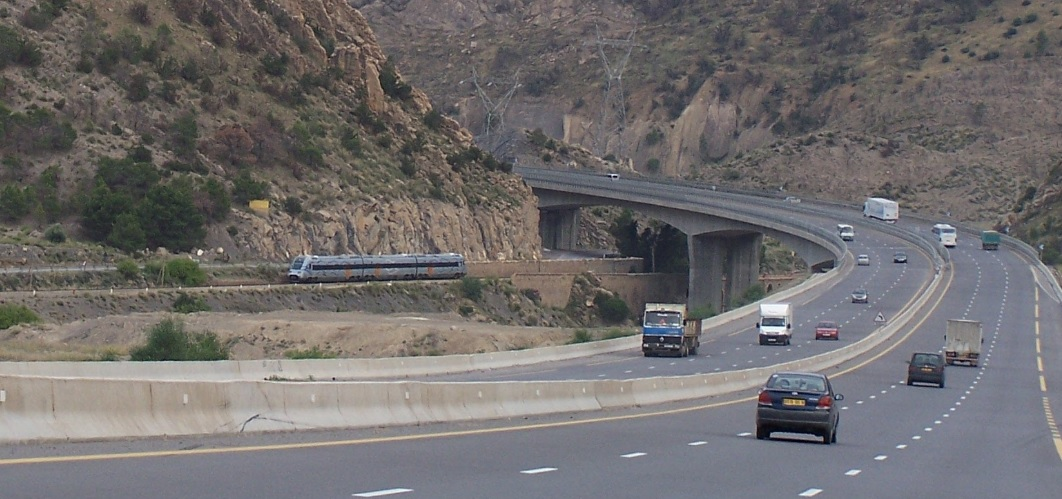
- DMU using the Algiers-Skikda line near the East–West Highway in the Bibans

Overview
- Stations: 51

Service
- Type: Heavy rail
- System: SNTF

History
- Opened: 1 September 1870
- Last extension: 1886

Technical
- Line length: 540 km (340 mi)
- Number of tracks: Single track (270 km) and double-track (281 km)
- Track gauge: 1,435 mm (4 ft 8 1/2 in) standard gauge
- Electrification: 25 kV AC overhead line from Algiers station to Thénia
- Operating speed: 80 km/h (50 mph)
Route map
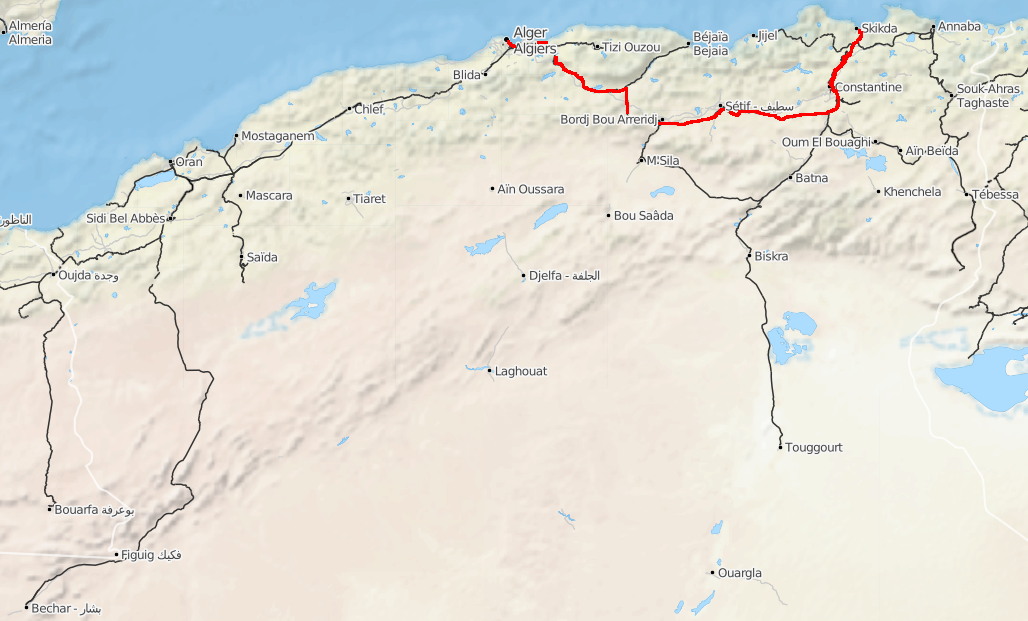

The Algiers–Skikda railway is one of the two trunk lines in the Algerian railway network, the other being the Algiers–Oran railway. The line hosts passenger services connecting Algiers station with either Annaba or Constantine, the two largest cities in eastern Algeria. The first segment of the line connected Constantine to the port of Skikda and opened on September 1, 1870, remaining isolated from the remainder of the Algerian network until the opening of the Algiers–Constantine section in 1879 and further extensions on November 3, 1886.

== Description ==
=== Algiers–Thénia section ===
The 53.5 kilometer section between Algiers and Thénia includes 10 kilometers shared with the Algiers–Oran railway from Algiers station to the El Harrach wye. This segment has been electrified in 2009 (25,000 volt) and is double-track. Further upgrades are being applied to the line.

130 daily passenger trains use the portion shared with the Algiers–Oran railway, while 63 trains a day continue east on further parts of the line. Commuter rail services using this portion of the Algiers-Skikda line connect Algiers to Houari Boumediene Airport and Thénia, among others.

=== Thénia–Constantine section ===
The Thénia–Constantine is not electrified and is single track from Thénia to Bordj Bou Arréridj and from Ramdane Djamel to Skikda. The portion between Sétif and the town of El Guerrah (in the municipality of Ouled Rahmoun) is being upgraded by SNTF.

== Services ==
One day train connects Algiers and Constantine in 7 hours while a night train connects Algiers and Annaba. The namesake of this line, Skikda, is not served by passenger services any more; passengers are required to connect at the nearby Ramdane Djamel station.

Regional services connect Algiers to Sétif, Béjaïa (via the Béni Mansour–Bejaïa railway), and M'Sila, Algeria.

== Speeds ==
Passenger services on this line operate at speeds of 70–80 km/h. The Bordj Bou Arreridj-Sétif segment sees trains reaching 100 km/h.
