= Cheraia =

Coordinates: 37°00′N 6°31′E

- Commune and town
- Interactive map of Cheraia
- Country: Algeria
- Province: Skikda Province
- Time zone: UTC+1 (CET)

Cheraia is a town and commune in Skikda Province in north-eastern Algeria.
