= Aïn Zouit =

Aïn Zouit عين زويت
- Commune and town
- Commune location in Skikda Province.

- Location within Algeria
- Coordinates: 36°53′25″N 6°47′08″E
- Country: Algeria
- Province: Skikda Province

Population (2008)
  - Total: 1,977
- Time zone: UTC+1 (CET)

Aïn Zouit is a town and commune in Skikda Province in north-eastern Algeria.
