= Aïn Bouziane =

Aïn Bouziane عين بوزيان
- Commune and town
- Aïn Bouziane within Skikda Province

- Aïn Bouziane within Algeria
- Coordinates: 36°35′53″N 6°45′05″E
- Country: Algeria
- Province: Skikda Province

Population (2008)
  - Total: 9,591
- Time zone: UTC+1 (CET)

Aïn Bouziane is a town and commune in Skikda Province in north-eastern Algeria.
