= Salah Boubnider =

Salah Boubnider (1929 – 27 May 2005) was an Algerian National Liberation Army colonel who was among the first to join the fight for independence. He was born in 1929 in Oued Zenati and died on 27 May 2005. He was a supporter of democracy and pluralism and opposed extremist Islamism.

== See also ==
- University of Salah Boubnider
