= El Marsa, Skikda =

Coordinates: 37°01′48″N 7°15′11″E

El Marsa
- Commune and town
- Interactive map of El Marsa
- Country: Algeria
- Province: Skikda Province
- Time zone: UTC+1 (CET)

El Marsa is a town and commune in Skikda Province in north-eastern Algeria.
