= Collo =

Collo القل
- City and Common
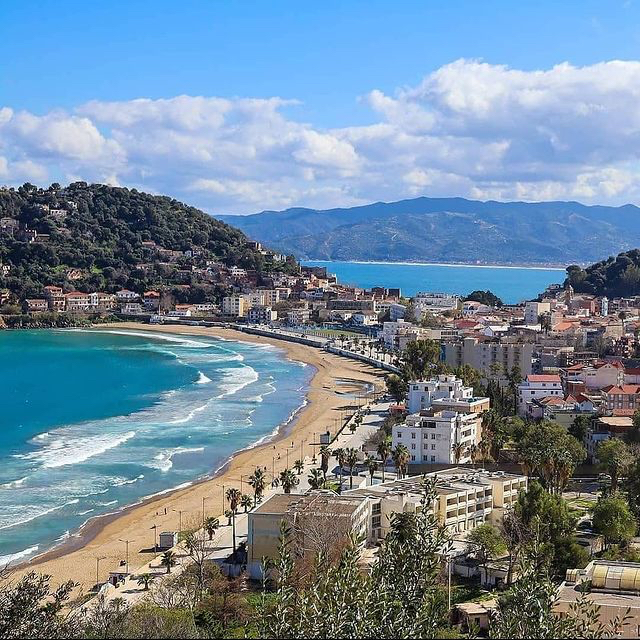
- Collo

- Location in Skikda Province

- Location in Algeria
- Coordinates: 37°0′20″N 6°33′37″E
- Country: Algeria
- Province: Skikda
- District: Collo
- APC: 2012–2017

Government
  - Type: Municipality
  - Mayor: Djamel Eddin Ghemired

Area
  - Total: 9.3 sq mi (24 km^{2})

Population (2008)
  - Total: 35,682
  - Density: 3,900/sq mi (1,500/km^{2})
- Time zone: UTC+1 (CET)
- Postal code: 21002
- ISO 3166 code: CP

Collo (Arabic: القل, romanized: al-Qull), known as Chullu in antiquity, is a port town in the Skikda Province in northeastern Algeria, and forms part of the Collo Massif region. It is the capital and one of three municipalities of the Collo District.

== History ==
In Roman times, Collo was a city in the province of Numidia, called Chullu. At the joint Conference of Carthage (411) that brought together Catholic and Donatist bishops of Roman Africa, Chullu was represented by the Catholic bishop Victor and the Donatist Fidentius.

In the book Al-Istibsar fi 'agaib al-Amsar, written in the late 12th century, the author wrote about the city:

"An ancient city with many ruins from the early Romans. Located on the seashore, it serves as the port of the city of Constantine. The city is rich in fruits and resources, with an abundance of grapes and remarkable apples. It holds strategic importance, generating significant revenue and oversight. It is both a land and maritime city."

In 1282, king Peter III of Aragon led an expedition to Collo, in proclaimed support of a rebellion against the ruler of Tunis. The rebellion had collapsed before Peter arrived, but he kept his army there for several weeks until, in the wake of the Sicilian Vespers, envoys from Sicily came to Collo to offer him its throne. The resulting war continued until 1301.

== Geography ==
Collo has a total area of 9 square miles (23 km^{2}). The city is distinguished by its containing a mountain range, the most prominent of which are el Goufi 3,881 ft (1,183 m), Sidi Achour 1,771 ft (540 m), and the Tars Mountains. It is known for its various beaches and tourist attractions.

=== Climate ===
Collo's climate is classified as warm and temperate. The rain falls mostly in the winter, with relatively little rain in the summer. According to the Köppen Climate Classification system, this climate is classified as "Csa". The average annual temperature is 63.1 °F (17.3 °C), and precipitation is about 32.32 in (821 mm) per year.

Climate data for Collo, Skikda (1991-2021 normals)
Month	Jan	Feb	Mar	Apr	May	Jun	Jul	Aug	Sep	Oct	Nov	Dec	Year
Mean daily maximum °F (°C)	56.6 (13.7)	56.9 (13.8)	61.8 (16.6)	66.1 (18.9)	72.2 (22.3)	80.4 (26.9)	87 (31)	87.7 (30.9)	80.8 (27.1)	75 (24)	64.6 (18.1)	58.7 (14.8)	70.7 (21.5)
Daily mean °F (°C)	50 (10)	49.9 (9.9)	53.9 (12.2)	58.3 (14.6)	64.4 (18.0)	78.1 (25.6)	78.1 (25.6)	78.7 (25.9)	73.3 (22.9)	67.5 (19.7)	58 (14)	52.3 (11.3)	63.5 (17.5)
Mean daily minimum °F (°C)	43.9 (6.6)	43.3 (6.3)	46.6 (8.1)	50.8 (10.4)	56.8 (13.8)	69.6 (20.9)	69.6 (20.9)	70.8 (21.6)	66.9 (19.4)	61.2 (16.2)	52.2 (11.2)	46.4 (8.0)	56.5 (13.6)
Average precipitation inches (mm)	4.4 (112)	3.9 (99)	3.2 (82)	2.9 (73)	2.0 (51)	0.6 (14)	0.1 (3)	0.5 (12)	2.0 (52)	3.2 (82)	4.8 (122)	4.7 (119)	32.3 (821)
Average precipitation days	10	9	8	8	5	2	1	2	6	8	11	10	80
Average relative humidity (%)	80	78	78	78	76	69	64	65	71	75	77	79	74
Mean daily sunshine hours	6.2	6.8	8.0	9.2	10.5	11.9	12.3	11.3	9.5	8.2	6.8	6.2	8.9
Source: climate-data.org

== Demographics ==
Historical population
Year	1901	1954	1966	1977	1987	1998	2008
Pop.	3,300	7,000	10,800	12,408	21,100	27,774	29,354
±%	—	+112.1%	+54.3%	+14.9%	+70.1%	+31.6%	+5.7%
Source: www.populstat.info, www.citypopulation.de

== Titular bishopric ==
In 1833, the Roman diocese was nominally revived as a titular see of the lowest (episcopal) rank. So far, it had four incumbents:

- Marc Lacroix, O.M.I. (1968.10.25 – 1970.11.24)
- Joseph Edra Ukpo (later Archbishop) (1971.04.24 – 1973.03.01)
- Franco Mulakkal (2009.01.17 – 2013.06.13)
- Varghese Thottamkara, Lazarists (C.M.) (2013.06.28 – present)

== See also ==
- European enclaves in North Africa before 1830

== Sources and external links ==
- GigaCatholic, with titular bishops list and linked biographies
