= Djendel Saadi Mohamed =

Coordinates: 36°46′50″N 7°10′15″E

- Commune and town
- Interactive map of Djendel Saadi Mohamed
- Country: Algeria
- Province: Skikda Province
- Time zone: UTC+1 (CET)

Djendel Saadi Mohamed is a town and commune in Skikda Province in north-eastern Algeria.
