= Zitouna, Skikda =

Coordinates: 36°59′20″N 6°27′30″E

Zitouna
- Commune and town
- Interactive map of Zitouna
- Country: Algeria
- Province: Skikda Province
- Time zone: UTC+1 (CET)

Zitouna is a town and commune in Skikda Province in north-eastern Algeria.
