= Aïn Kechra =

- Commune and town
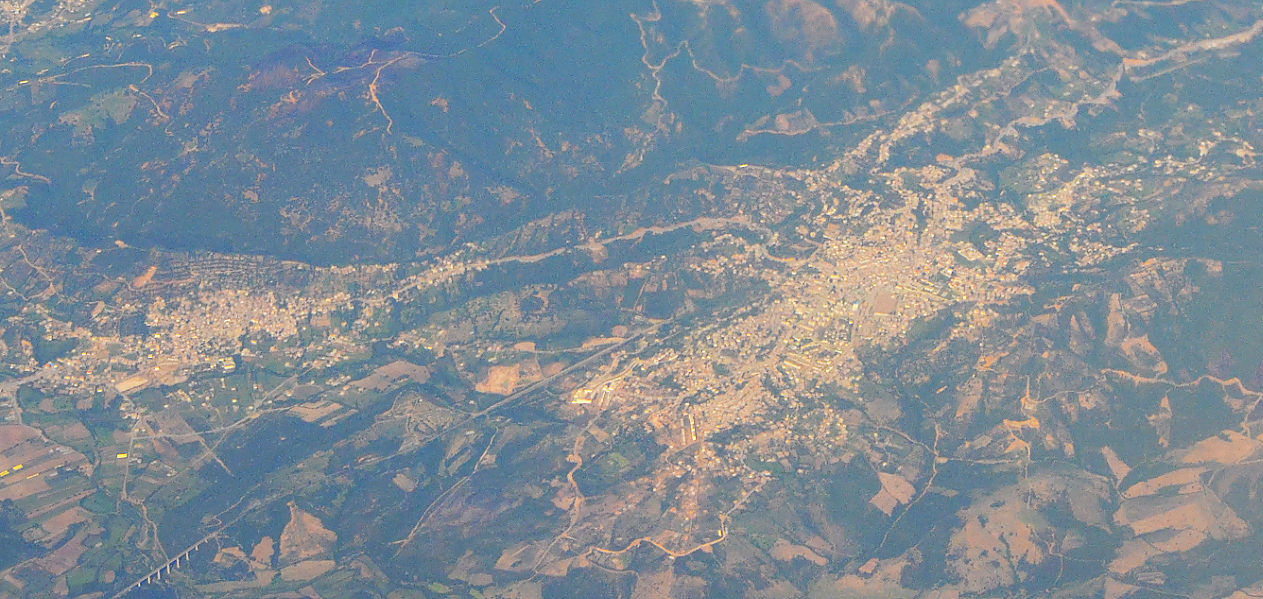
- Skyview of the commune

- Location of Aïn Kechra within Skikda Province

- Location of Aïn Kechra within Algeria
- Coordinates: 36°44′54″N 6°25′57″E
- Country: Algeria
- Province: Skikda Province

Population (2008)
  - Total: 24,572
- Time zone: UTC+1 (CET)

Aïn Kechra is a town and commune in Skikda Province in north-eastern Algeria.
