= Beni Bechir =

Coordinates: 36°47′N 6°56′E

- Commune and town
- Interactive map of Beni Bechir
- Country: Algeria
- Province: Skikda Province
- Time zone: UTC+1 (CET)

Beni Bechir is a town and commune in Skikda Province in north-eastern Algeria.
