= Azzaba, Algeria =

Azzaba عزابة
- Commune and town
- Commune location in Skikda Province.

- Location within Algeria
- Coordinates: 36°34′N 7°6′E
- Country: Algeria
- Province: Skikda Province

Population (2008)
  - Total: 56,922
- Time zone: UTC+1 (CET)

Azzaba is a town and commune in Azzaba District, Skikda Province, Algeria.
