= Skikda =

Skikda سكيكدة
- City
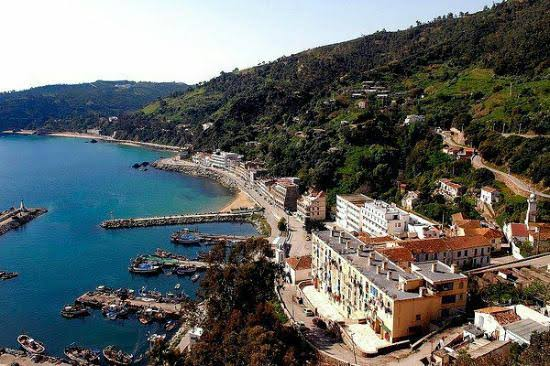
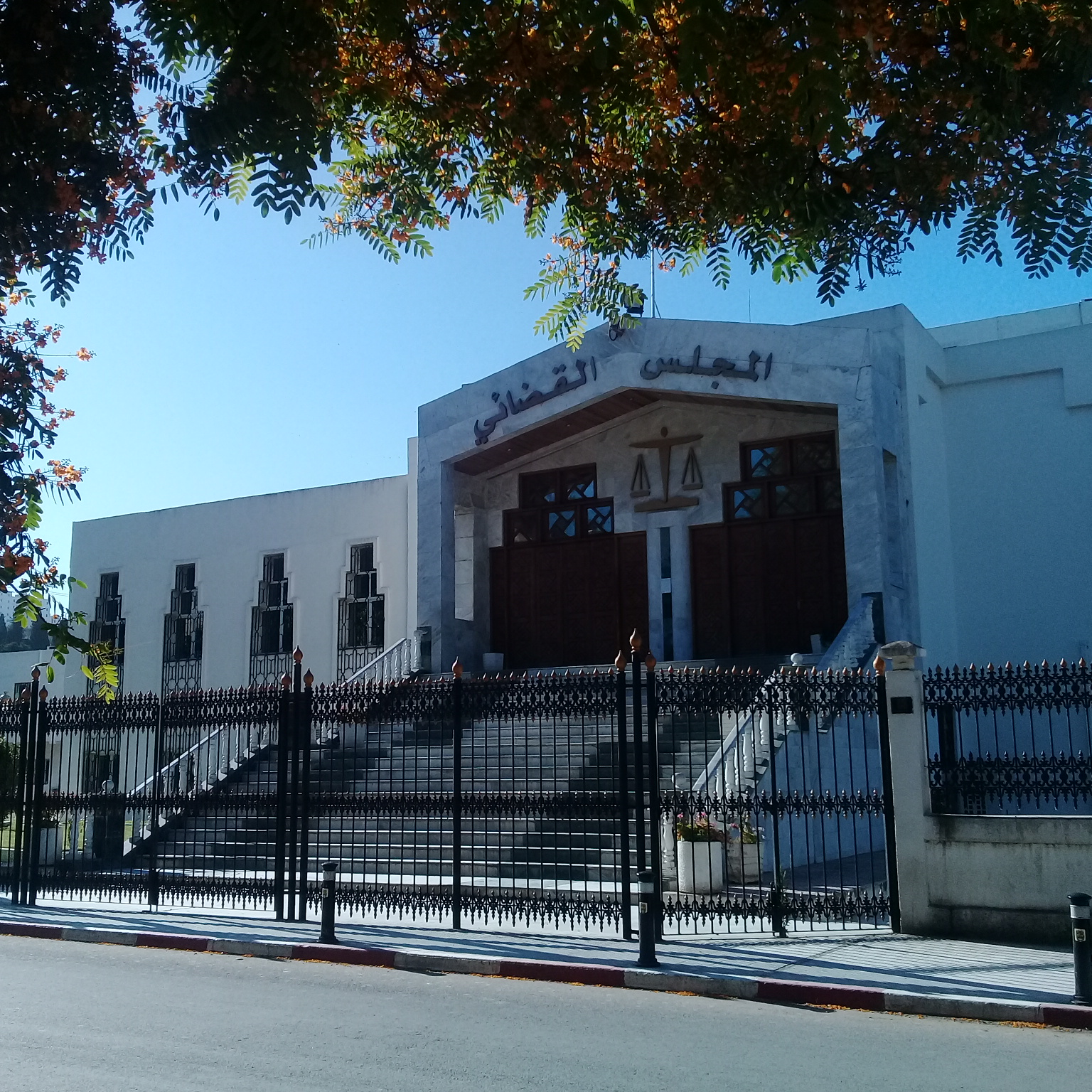
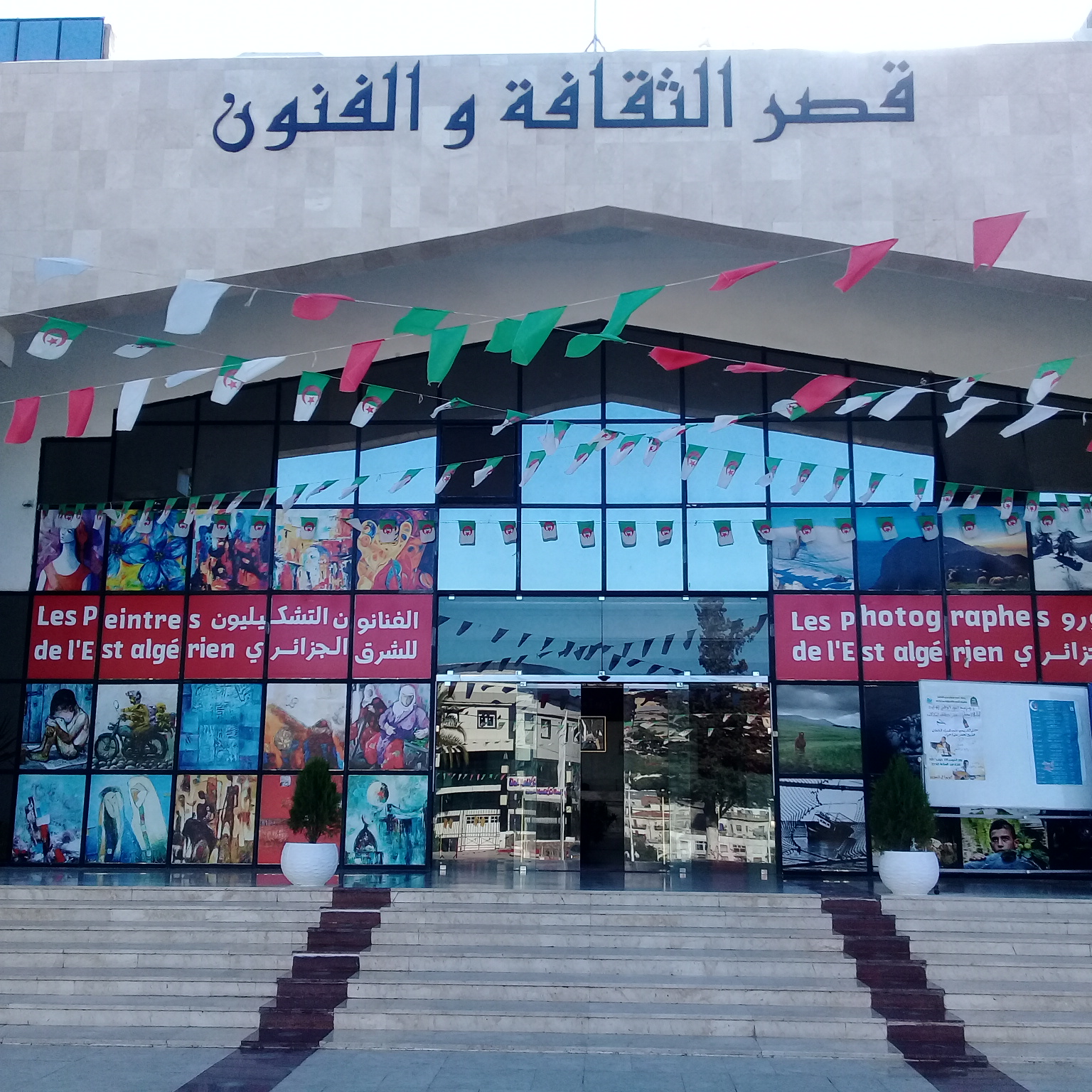
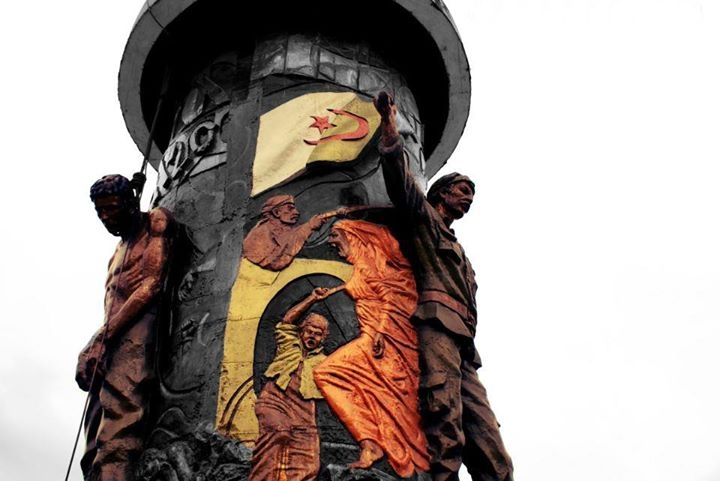
- Port of Stora in Skikda Court of Skikda Palace of Culture Monument commemorating Martyrs in Skikda

- Location of Skikda in the Skikda Province

- Location within Algeria
- Coordinates: 36°52′N 6°54′E
- Country: Algeria
- Province: Skikda
- District: Skikda District
- Founded: 1200 BC

Area
  - Total: 52 km^{2} (20 sq mi)
- Elevation: 18 m (59 ft)

Population (2017 census)
  - Total: 250,000
  - Density: 4,800/km^{2} (12,000/sq mi)
- Time zone: UTC+1 (CET)
- Postal code: 21000
- Climate: Csa

Skikda (Arabic: سكيكدة; formerly Philippeville from 1838 to 1962 and Rusicade in ancient times) is a city in northeastern Algeria and a port on the Mediterranean. It is the capital of Skikda Province and Skikda District.

== History ==
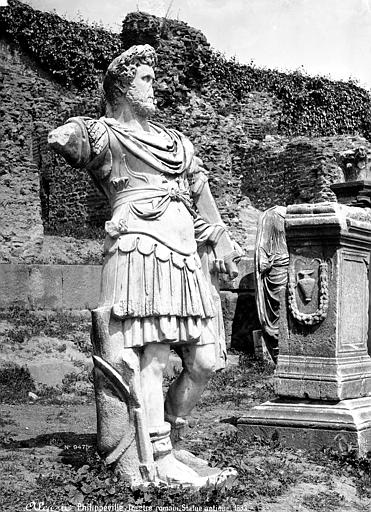
Statue from Skikda's museum

The Phoenicians and Carthaginians established a trading post and fort named rškd (𐤓𐤔𐤊𐤃, "Jug Cape") after Skikda's nearby cape. Falling under Roman hegemony after the Punic Wars, the name was Latinized as Rusicade or Rusiccade. Rusicade contained the largest Roman theatre in Algeria, dating to the reign of Hadrian.

Russicada was the Mediterranean port city serving Cirta. It overlooked the straits between Sicily (Europe) and Numidia (Africa), a place of significant relevance in geopolitical strategies at the time. Russicada was mentioned by the medieval chronicler Geoffrey of Monmouth in his pseudo-historical accounts of the mythical kings of Britain and their deeds as "Rusicada".

In late antiquity, the port was destroyed during the Vandals' invasion of 530. The Byzantines reconquered the region in 533 and 534, but left large areas under Berber control. The town was overrun by the Umayyad Caliphate at the end of the 7th century.

Present-day Skikda was founded by French governor Sylvain Charles Valée in 1838 under the name Philippeville, honoring the French king at the time. The French were in the process of annexing Algeria and developed Philippeville as a port for Constantine, Algeria's third-largest city. The two cities were connected by rail. The harbour works, with every vessel in port, was destroyed by a storm in 1878; a larger harbour was then built. On 10 October 1883, there was an earthquake in Philippeville.

Towards the end of World War II, a UNRRA refugee camp name Camp Jeanne d'Arc was established near the city. On 25 January 1945, 200 Jews holding citizenship from countries in North and South America were sent from the Bergen-Belsen concentration camp to Switzerland as part of a prisoner exchange group. They were later sent to the UNRRA camp in Skikda.

=== Battle of Philippeville ===
An attack by the FLN in 1955 during the war of Independence left around 123 civilians dead, mainly French and those suspected of collaboration. Angered over the massacre of civilians, including women, seniors, and babies, the French escalated their offensive against the FLN. Reprisals by French forces may have killed between 1,200 (according to French sources,) and 12,000 civilians (according to the FLN.)

=== 1989 shipping disaster ===
The city has a commercial harbour with a gas and oil terminal. On 15 February 1989 the Dutch tanker the MV Maassluis was anchored just outside the port, waiting to dock the next day at the terminal, when extreme weather broke out. The ship's anchors did not hold and the ship smashed on the pier-head of the port. The disaster killed 27 of the 29 people on board.

== Modern Skikda ==
The city has a population of over 250,000 inhabitant. Natural gas, oil refining, and petrochemical industries were developed in the 1970s and pipelines have been built for their transportation. The city hall (a neo-moorish style palace) and the railroad station were designed by Le Corbusier.

The official city flag colours are blue and white, reflecting the colours of the Mediterranean. The current postal code is 21000. Skikda has the third largest commercial port in Algeria after Algiers and Oran. It has also a petrochemical terminal port and a smaller fishing port in Stora, and there are many beaches along the natural Mediterranean coastline. There is also a closed airport near the petrochemical complex.

== Geography ==
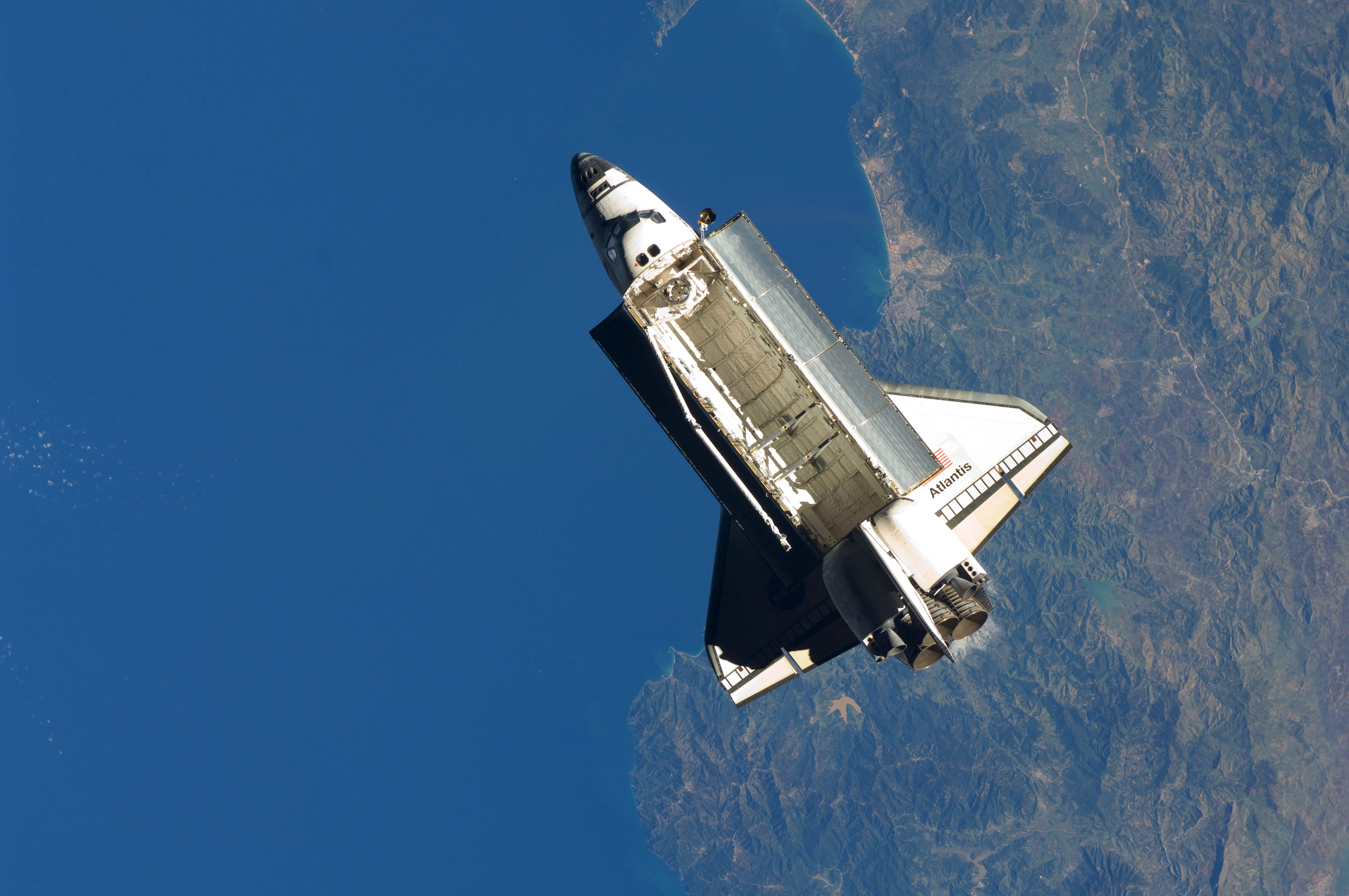
Skikda under Space Shuttle Atlantis, November 2009

Skikda lies on the coast of the Gulf of Stora, part of the Mediterranean Sea. The landscape is hilly and forested, with high ridges on both the western and eastern sides of the city.

=== Climate ===
Skikda has a Mediterranean climate (Köppen climate classification Csa), with cool, wet winters and very warm, dry summers.

Climate data for Skikda (1961–1990, extremes 1926–1992)
Month	Jan	Feb	Mar	Apr	May	Jun	Jul	Aug	Sep	Oct	Nov	Dec	Year
Record high °C (°F)	26.4 (79.5)	30.6 (87.1)	32.0 (89.6)	34.6 (94.3)	38.8 (101.8)	41.0 (105.8)	44.4 (111.9)	46.7 (116.1)	44.0 (111.2)	38.0 (100.4)	33.0 (91.4)	28.0 (82.4)	46.7 (116.1)
Mean daily maximum °C (°F)	16.1 (61.0)	16.6 (61.9)	17.5 (63.5)	19.5 (67.1)	22.2 (72.0)	25.1 (77.2)	28.4 (83.1)	28.9 (84.0)	27.3 (81.1)	24.3 (75.7)	20.5 (68.9)	17.1 (62.8)	22.0 (71.6)
Daily mean °C (°F)	12.0 (53.6)	12.3 (54.1)	13.2 (55.8)	15.1 (59.2)	17.9 (64.2)	21.0 (69.8)	23.9 (75.0)	24.6 (76.3)	22.9 (73.2)	19.8 (67.6)	16.1 (61.0)	13.0 (55.4)	17.6 (63.7)
Mean daily minimum °C (°F)	8.0 (46.4)	7.9 (46.2)	8.8 (47.8)	10.7 (51.3)	13.5 (56.3)	16.7 (62.1)	19.4 (66.9)	20.2 (68.4)	18.5 (65.3)	15.3 (59.5)	11.6 (52.9)	8.9 (48.0)	13.3 (55.9)
Record low °C (°F)	0.0 (32.0)	−0.5 (31.1)	−0.6 (30.9)	3.0 (37.4)	5.0 (41.0)	8.0 (46.4)	10.2 (50.4)	12.3 (54.1)	11.6 (52.9)	2.0 (35.6)	0.0 (32.0)	0.0 (32.0)	−0.6 (30.9)
Average precipitation mm (inches)	115.3 (4.54)	94.0 (3.70)	75.6 (2.98)	60.8 (2.39)	29.9 (1.18)	13.1 (0.52)	2.9 (0.11)	9.7 (0.38)	30.1 (1.19)	75.0 (2.95)	99.2 (3.91)	123.0 (4.84)	728.8 (28.69)
Average precipitation days (≥ 0.1 mm)	15	11	12	10	7	5	1	3	7	12	13	16	112
Average relative humidity (%)	75	75	75	75	76	75	73	75	75	74	75	75	75
Mean monthly sunshine hours	139.5	155.4	207.7	222.0	279.0	306.0	356.5	322.4	258.0	201.5	156.0	133.3	2,737.3
Mean daily sunshine hours	4.5	5.5	6.7	7.4	9.0	10.2	11.5	10.4	8.6	6.5	5.2	4.3	7.5
Source 1: NOAA
Source 2: Deutscher Wetterdienst (extremes 1926–1992, sun 1952–1990, humidity 1973–1992, and avg. precipitation days 1952–1970)

== Economy ==
Historically, Skikda is known for its seaport. It was described, in 1911, by Baedeker as having "the youngest Algerian seaport."
On 19 January 2004, a fire and explosion at the Skikda LNG facility killed 29 people and caused $940,000,000 worth of damage. The accident incapacitated three LNG trains and impacted approximately 2% of the world's liquefaction capacity. The explosion was preceded by the ingestion of a sizable leak of cold hydrocarbon into the boiler of the westernmost LNG line. This caused the boiler to explode. According to a 2018 report by Marsh McLennan on the 100 largest losses in the hydrocarbon industry, the Skikda explosion is the second most damaging gas processing incident since 1974.

== Education ==
The University of Skikda is the main educational institution in the city and the province, with two campuses located in Azabba and Al-Hadaiq, attracting students from local, national, and international backgrounds. It offers a range of programs, including specialized courses in petrochemical engineering, which are key to the region's industrial development. The university plays a significant role in preparing students for careers in various fields, contributing to Skikda as a growing industrial and logistics city.

== Sport ==
=== Football ===
Skikda, with football being the most popular. The city's top club, JSM Skikda, represents Skikda in national competitions and has the largest supporters base in the province. The team plays at the Skikda Stadium of 20 August 1955. In addition to JSM Skikda, there are other clubs and football academies competing in inter-regional leagues.

=== Handball ===
Handball is also a prominent sport in Skikda, with JS Esperance de Skikda being a dominant club that represent the city and province in the national league. The club is well-known for its success, having won numerous national and international titles and currently playing in the top tier.

== Transportation ==
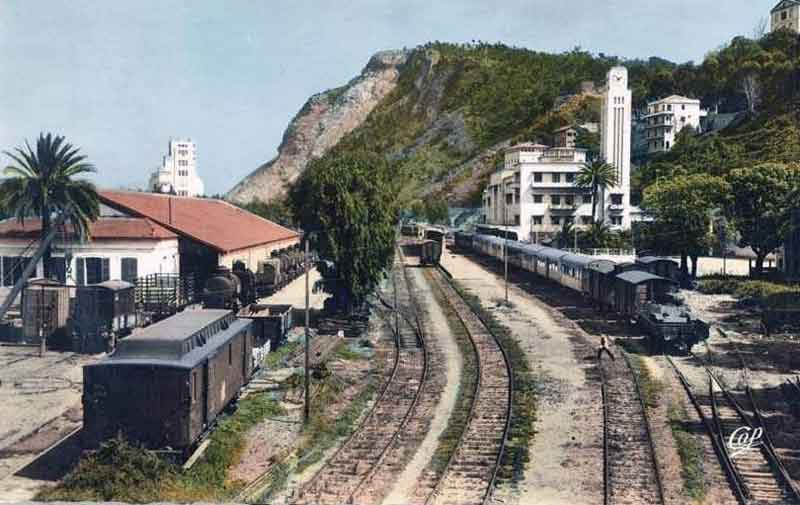
Skikda Railway Station

The main road from Skikda is the N3 to El Arrouch, Constantine, Batna, Biskra and Touggourt. Smaller local roads lead to the towns of Stora (to the northwest along the coast), Beni Bechir (to the south), Bissy and Azzaba (to the southeast), and El Mersa and Chetaibi (to the east).

Skikda is the terminus of the Algiers-Skikda line – one of the SNTF mainline railroads, although most passenger and cargo services branch off in nearby Ramdane Djamel (towards the Ramdane Djamel-Annaba or Ramdane Djamel-Jijel lines before reaching Skikda).

== Notable people ==
- Rose Celli (1895–1982), novelist, playwright, translator and poet
- Aissa draoui (1950-2006), One of the greatest Skikda football players
- Gustave Pierre blanchard (1892-1963), Actor
- Hocine Bouchache (1932-1999) One of the greatest Skikda football players, coach

== Photo Gallery ==
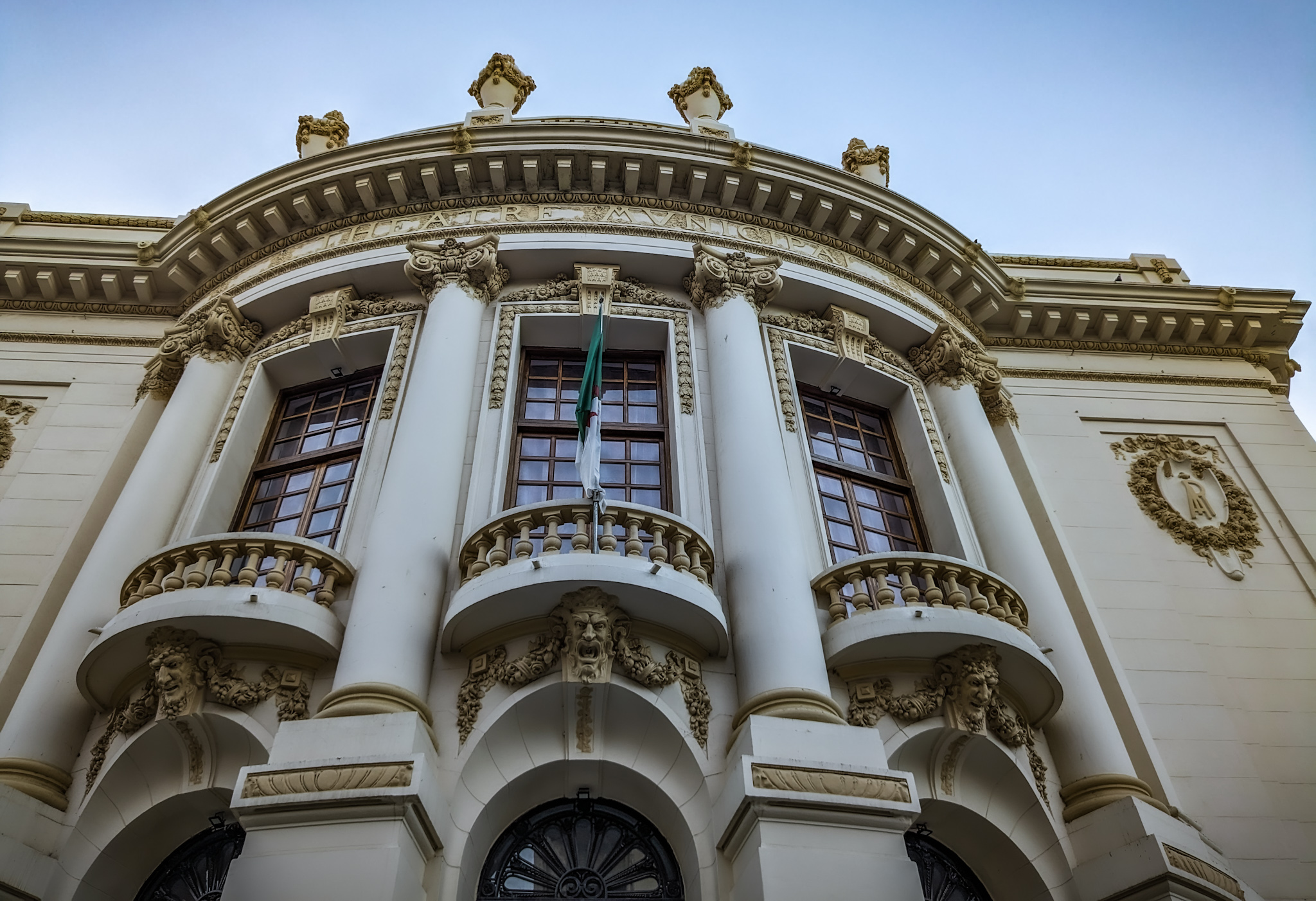
Regional Theatre of Skikda
