= Skikda Province =

Province of Algeria

Skikda Province ولاية سكيكدة
- Province
- Nickname: Strawberry Capital
- Map of Algeria highlighting Skikda
- Coordinates: 36°52′N 6°54′E
- Country: Algeria
- Capital: Skikda

Government
  - Wāli: Said Akhrouf

Area
  - Total: 4,026 km^{2} (1,554 sq mi)

Population (2019)
  - Total: 1,109,355
  - Density: 275.5/km^{2} (713.7/sq mi)
- Demonym: Skikdish or Skikdian
- Time zone: UTC+01 (CET)
- Area Code: +213 (0) 38
- ISO 3166 code: DZ-21
- Districts: 13
- Municipalities: 38

Skikda (Arabic: ولاية سكيكدة) is a province (wilaya) of Algeria, on its eastern Mediterranean coastline, with 1,095,666 inhabitants in 2019 and a natural annual growth rate estimated at 1.22%.

== Geography ==
The Skikda Province faces the Mediterranean Sea to the north and has common borders with the provinces of Annaba and Guelma to the east, Constantine and Mila to the south, and Jijel to the west. It extends over 4,137.68 km2, with a population of around 804,697 inhabitants. It has 130 km of coastline stretching from El Marsa in the east to Oued Z'hour in the depths of the Collo massif in the west.

== History ==
The province was created from Constantine (department) in 1974.

== Administrative divisions ==
The province is divided into 13 districts (daïras), which are further divided into 38 communes or municipalities.

=== Districts ===
1. Aïn Kechra
2. Azzaba
3. Ben Azzouz
4. Collo
5. El Hadaik
6. El Harrouch
7. Ouled Attia
8. Oum Toub
9. Ramdane Djamel
10. Sidi Mezghiche
11. Skikda
12. Tamalous
13. Zitouna

=== Communes ===
1. Aïn Bouziane
2. Aïn Charchar (Ain Cherchar)
3. Aïn Kechra
4. Aïn Zouit
5. Azzaba
6. Bekkouche Lakhdar
7. Benazouz (Ben Azzouz)
8. Beni Bechir
9. Beni Oulbane
10. Beni Zid
11. Bir El Ouiden
12. Bouchtata
13. Cheraia
14. Collo
15. Djendel Saadi Mohamed
16. El Ghedir
17. El Hadaik
18. El Harrouch
19. El Marsa
20. Emdjez Edchich
21. Essebt (Es Sebt)
22. Filfla (Fil Fila)
23. Hamadi Krouma
24. Kanoua
25. Kerkera
26. Kheneg Mayoum
27. Oued Z'hor
28. Ouldja Boulballout (Ouldja Boulbalout)
29. Ouled Attia
30. Ouled Hbaba (Ouled Hebaba)
31. Oum Toub
32. Ramdane Djamel
33. Salah Bouchaour
34. Sidi Mezghiche
35. Skikda
36. Tamalous
37. Zerdazas
38. Zitouna
