= General Leclerc's aviation accident =

1947 aviation accident in French Algeria

General Leclerc's aviation accident Accident de l'avion du général Leclerc
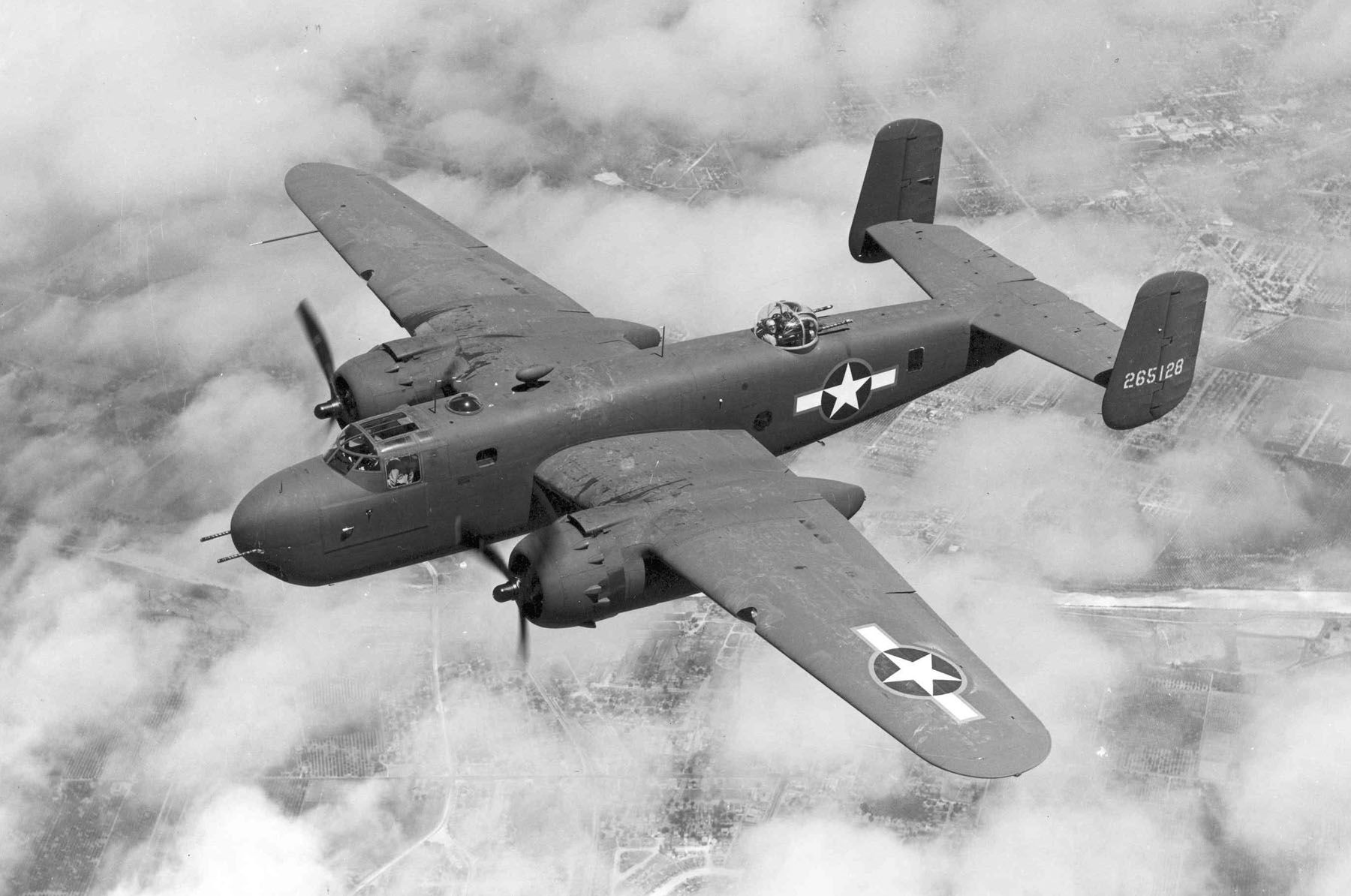
- An American B-25

Accident
- Date: 28 November 1947 (78 years ago)
- Summary: Ground impact during marginal weather conditions
- Site: near Colomb-Béchar, French Algeria; 32.131632°N 2.321962°W

Aircraft
- Aircraft type: North American B-25 Mitchell
- Aircraft name: Tailly II
- Operator: French Air Force
- Registration: F-SCCX (formerly USAAF 41-30330)
- Flight origin: La Sénia Aerodrome, Es Sénia, French Algeria
- Destination: Colomb-Béchar Airport, Colomb-Béchar, French Algeria
- Occupants: 13
- Passengers: 9 (8 known, 1 unknown)
- Crew: 4
- Fatalities: 13
- Survivors: 0

General Leclerc's aviation accident (French: Accident de l'avion du général Leclerc) took place on 28 November 1947 near the city of Colomb-Béchar in the western Sahara, then in French Algeria.

A B-25 Mitchell medium bomber operated by the French Air Force, named Tailly II and converted into an official aircraft for General Leclerc, crashed around noon near the Mediterranean–Niger Railway, (Note: The history of the Mediterranean–Niger Railway, of which parts were extant by the early 1920s, is intertwined with that of the overarching Trans-Saharan Railway effort.) about 50 kilometres (31 mi) north of Colomb-Béchar Airport, which it was attempting to reach. The four crew members and eight passengers, including Leclerc, were killed instantly. A 13th unidentified body was found in the wreckage, leading to controversy regarding the causes of the accident.

== Sequence of events ==
Having departed on 26 November 1947 from Villacoublay, in the Paris suburbs, for an inspection tour in North Africa, General Leclerc spent the afternoon of the 26th and the day of the 27th in the Arzew–La Macta region on the coast, east of Oran, to attend an interservice maneuver.

This troop movement took place in an area where potential future oil fields had just been identified by the geologist explorer Conrad Kilian, sites of strategic value for France in a world where the United States and the United Kingdom still held a near-monopoly on oil reserves.

On the morning of 28 November, General Leclerc attended a military ceremony in Arzew, then headed to La Sénia Aerodrome, where his personal aircraft, a B-25 Mitchell named Tailly II, (Note: Tailly is a commune in the Somme where the Leclerc family estate is located, and was also the name of Leclerc's command tank during the war.) awaited him. This aircraft, originally a twin-engine medium bomber, had been converted for the transport of military authorities. It included a small office and berths. The aircraft was to take him to Colomb-Béchar, a town located 200 kilometres (120 mi) south of Oran, near the border with Morocco, where he was to spend the day. The weather was bad, with the morning bulletin stating that "the Oran-Colomb-Béchar route was on the southeastern edge of a major disturbance [...]. A general worsening was expected from the west with the formation of numerous sandstorms."

The pilot hesitated but knew that General Leclerc hated delays. The plane eventually took off at 10:15, and it had enough fuel to turn back if the weather prevented it from landing at Colomb-Béchar. However, another pilot, who was supposed to make the same route on an AAC.1 Toucan, canceled the flight due to the weather. The plane was expected to arrive one and a half hours later, at 11:45. After fifteen minutes of flight, the radio operator asked Béchar for an update on the weather conditions and received a Morse code response: "Light intermittent rain, visibility six to ten kilometers. (Note: 6–10 kilometres (3.7–6.2 mi)) Ceiling: 10/10 at 500 meters, (Note: 500 metres (1,600 ft)) summits obscured. Wind: southern sector, 50 to 60 km/h with gusts". (Note: 50–60 kilometres per hour (31–37 mph)) These conditions were not good but still acceptable. The plane was flying at 8,000 feet (2,400 m), facing a headwind likely at 100 kilometres per hour (62 mph).

At 11:34, the Béchar airport sent its radio direction finding (gonio) (Note: "Gonio" is a shortening of radiogoniometer. See also Bellini–Tosi direction finder.) position, but this type of position was considered unreliable by pilots at the time. A dozen minutes later, the plane flew over the Bon-Arfa station, and the crew spotted the railway line. The pilot, Lieutenant François Delluc, decided to lower the plane to a low altitude and follow the Mediterranean–Niger Railway, leading to Colomb-Béchar (this line connected Colomb-Béchar to Oujda in Morocco, near the Mediterranean). Witnesses saw it pass, about 20 metres (66 ft) above the ground, at an estimated speed of 250 kilometres per hour (160 mph). At this point, the railway line crossed a large desert plateau.

The landing time was postponed twice by a quarter of an hour by the crew. The last message from the B-25 stated: Tout va bien à bord, sommes à dix minutes du terrain. (English: All is well on board, we are ten minutes from the airfield). At that moment, the railway line they were following left the desert plateau and entered the hills. The plane likely attempted to regain altitude.

An hour later, as rumors of an accident began to spread in Colomb-Béchar, a column of the 1st Saharan company of the Legion led by Lieutenant-Colonel Dudezert set out northward, following the railway line. When they arrived, they found the wreckage of the bomber scattered on either side of the embankment of the railway over several dozen meters (yards). The plane appeared to have struck the embankment. The rear of the aircraft was to the left of the tracks, with the engines about 40 metres (130 ft) further on the right. Kerosene was spilled on the ground and still burning, as were the scattered body parts.

== Identification of the bodies ==
The legionnaires and rescue workers began identifying the bodies on the afternoon of the 28th at the crash site. All victims had been decapitated upon impact with the ground, so the trunks were identified based on uniforms, ranks, and personal papers. General Leclerc's body was identified by his partially burned wallet, signet ring, and a piece of his cane.

The accident was reported by wire services and Leclerc's death was front-page news in various American and Canadian newspapers on the 28th, and early-morning newspapers in London on the 29th, given time zone differences.

Once the bodies were transported to the morgue of the Colomb-Béchar hospital in the evening, 13 bodies were formally counted before final burial by Lieutenant Doctor Paul Judeau and Commander Roque, even though the plane was believed to be carrying 12 men.

== Reactions and investigations ==
The 12 identified bodies arrived in Algiers by train on 2 December, then in Paris on the 6th. On the 8th, Leclerc was buried in Les Invalides alongside Foch, Turenne, and Vauban after a day of national mourning.

The official report concluded that the crash was due to the recklessness of pilot François Delluc, despite his experience and extremely distinguished service record, (Note: Lieutenant Delluc was not General Leclerc's regular pilot, but as the regular pilot, Lieutenant Legoc, was ill and at the Villacoublay base, the commander of the fr:Groupe de liaisons aériennes ministérielles (GLAM, English: Ministerial Air Liaison Group) designated Delluc to replace him. Delluc had already completed six flights for Leclerc. He was considered a très consciencieux, sérieux, pondéré (English: very conscientious, serious, and level-headed) pilot, with over 2,000 flight hours. During the war, between May and December 1944, he had flown 36 combat missions aboard heavy Halifax bombers from England.) and the persistence of General Leclerc, who ignored the unfavorable weather conditions.

In his biography of Leclerc, Jean-Christophe Notin demonstrated that the American-made B-25 had been dangerously modified by the French Air Force by adding a bunk at the rear, which may have caused a counterbalance and led to the crash, especially since the aircraft was known to tip backward at low speeds. He added that no other B-25 had ever been used to carry so many passengers.

Three rumors circulated about Leclerc's death, especially due to the presence of the 13th passenger:

- Leclerc, overshadowing de Gaulle, was allegedly assassinated by loyal Gaullists;
- the KGB allegedly assassinated Leclerc, as he could have suppressed a hypothetical communist revolution in France;
- Conrad Kilian, an oil discoverer in the Fezzan, and Leclerc allegedly opposed British views on Libya, and the assassination was allegedly organized by British secret services.

Notin refuted these rumors, as the impact site demonstrated a crash rather than an explosion; the engines, carefully inspected, showed no defects. Notin further postulated that passengers moving toward the rear of the aircraft, along with reduced speed due to the weather, induced a flat spin.

== List of passengers and crew ==
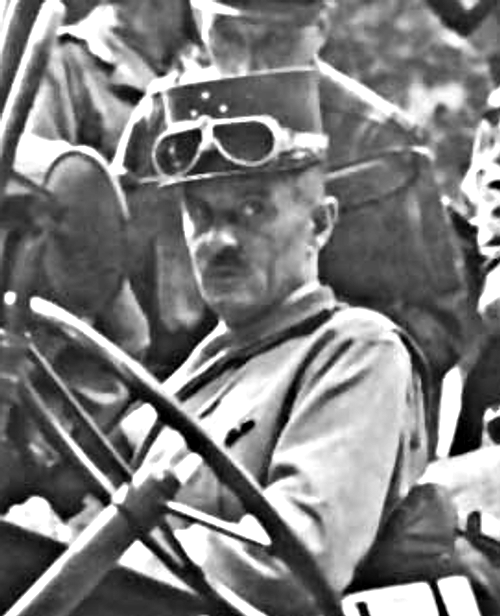
General Leclerc

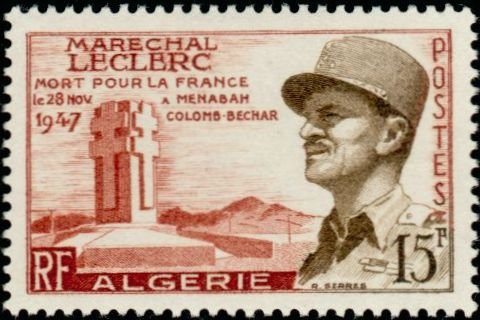
A 1956 postage stamp issued by French Algeria with a drawing of the crash site memorial

The B-25 was known to be carrying four crew members and eight passengers:

- Lieutenant François Delluc, 31, pilot
- Lieutenant André Pilleboue, 29, navigator
- Chief Warrant Officer Jean Guillou, 29, mechanic
- Staff Sergeant Eugène Lamotte, 25, radio operator
- General of the Army Philippe Leclerc de Hauteclocque, 45, Inspector General in North Africa
- Colonel Théodore Fieschi, 41, Chief of Staff of the Inspector General
- Colonel Charles Clémentin, 47
- Colonel Louis du Garreau de La Méchenie, 47
- Colonel Paul Fouchet, 47, Chief of Staff of the 10th military region
- Captain Georges Frichement, 51
- Commander Michel Meyrand, 37
- Second Lieutenant Robert Miron de L'Espinay, 24, aide-de-camp

A 13th body, wearing a French Air Force uniform with the rank of lieutenant, was found mutilated in the wreckage of the aircraft and has never been identified. During the repatriation of the bodies to France, one coffin was missing during disembarkation in Marseille, fueling rumors. However, this body was buried in the Saint-Eugène Christian Cemetery in Algiers. Notin suggested that the 13th passenger could have been an airman catching a ride, considered a common practice, which would have resulted in him not appearing on the passenger list. However, the lack of any family coming forward in search of such a missing airman remains unexplained.

A monument to Leclerc is located at the site of the crash.

== Gallery ==
Items recovered from the crash, now in Paris museums
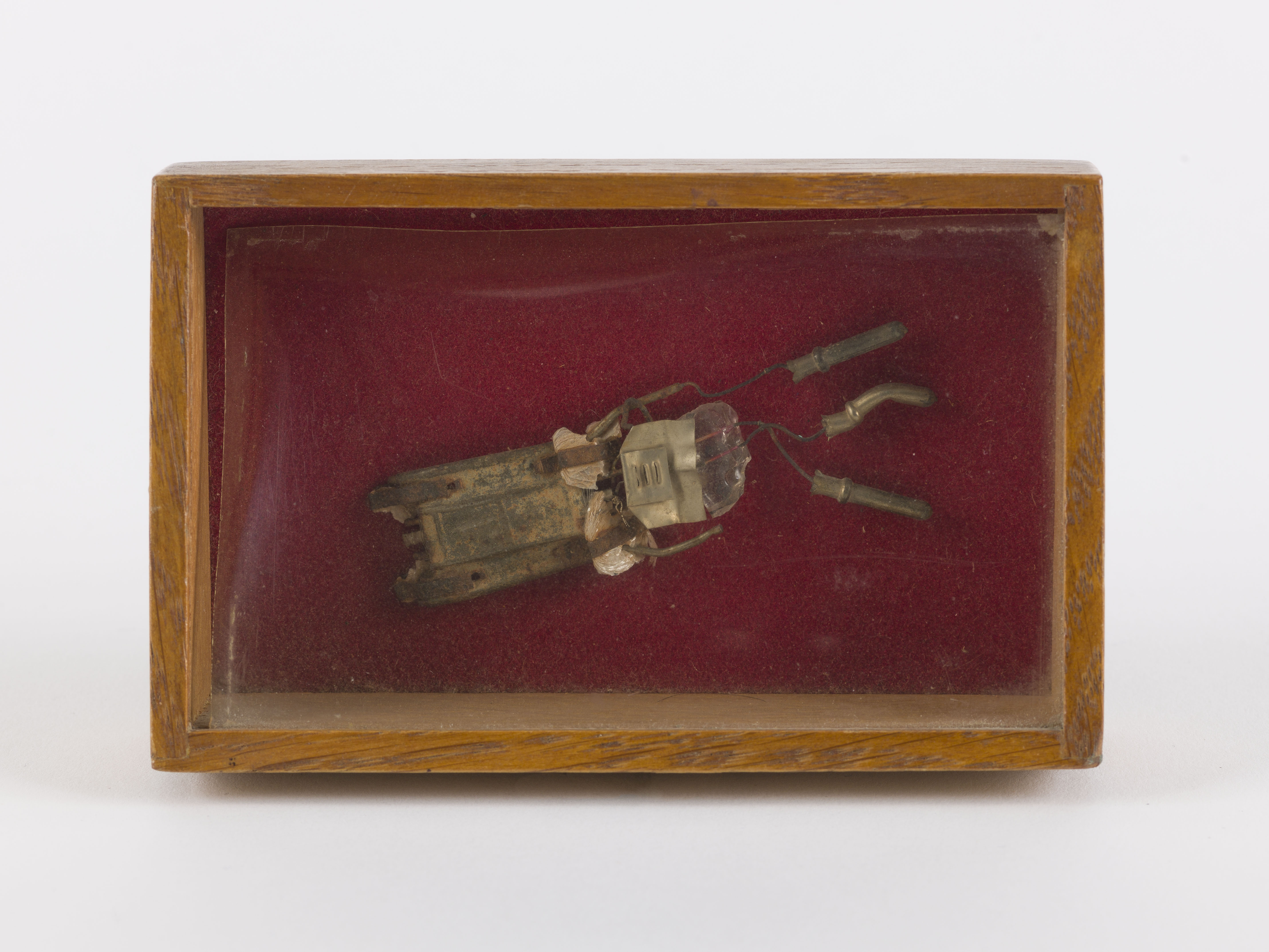
Fragment of a lamp

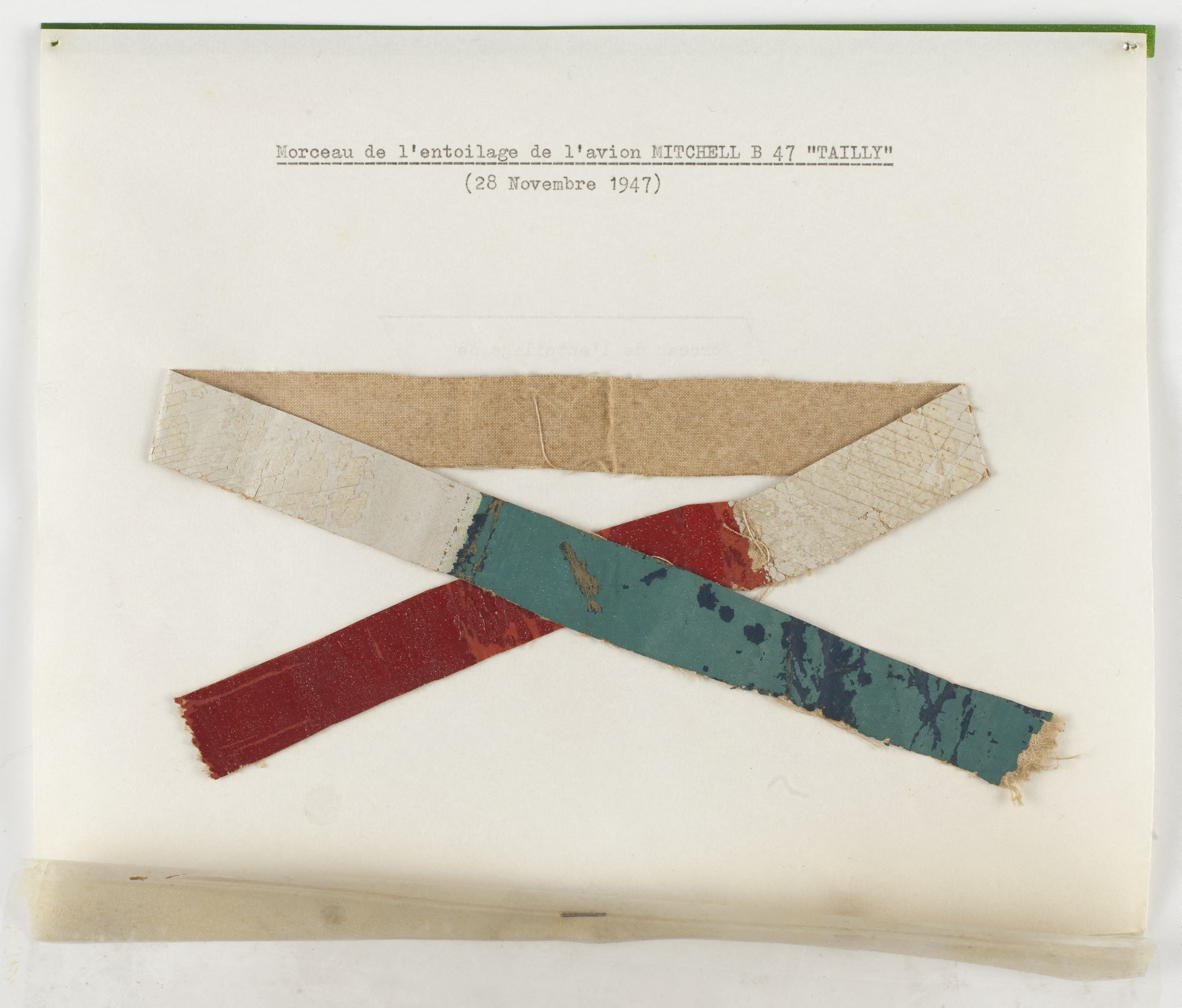
Tricolor ribbon from a roundel of the aircraft's fabric covering

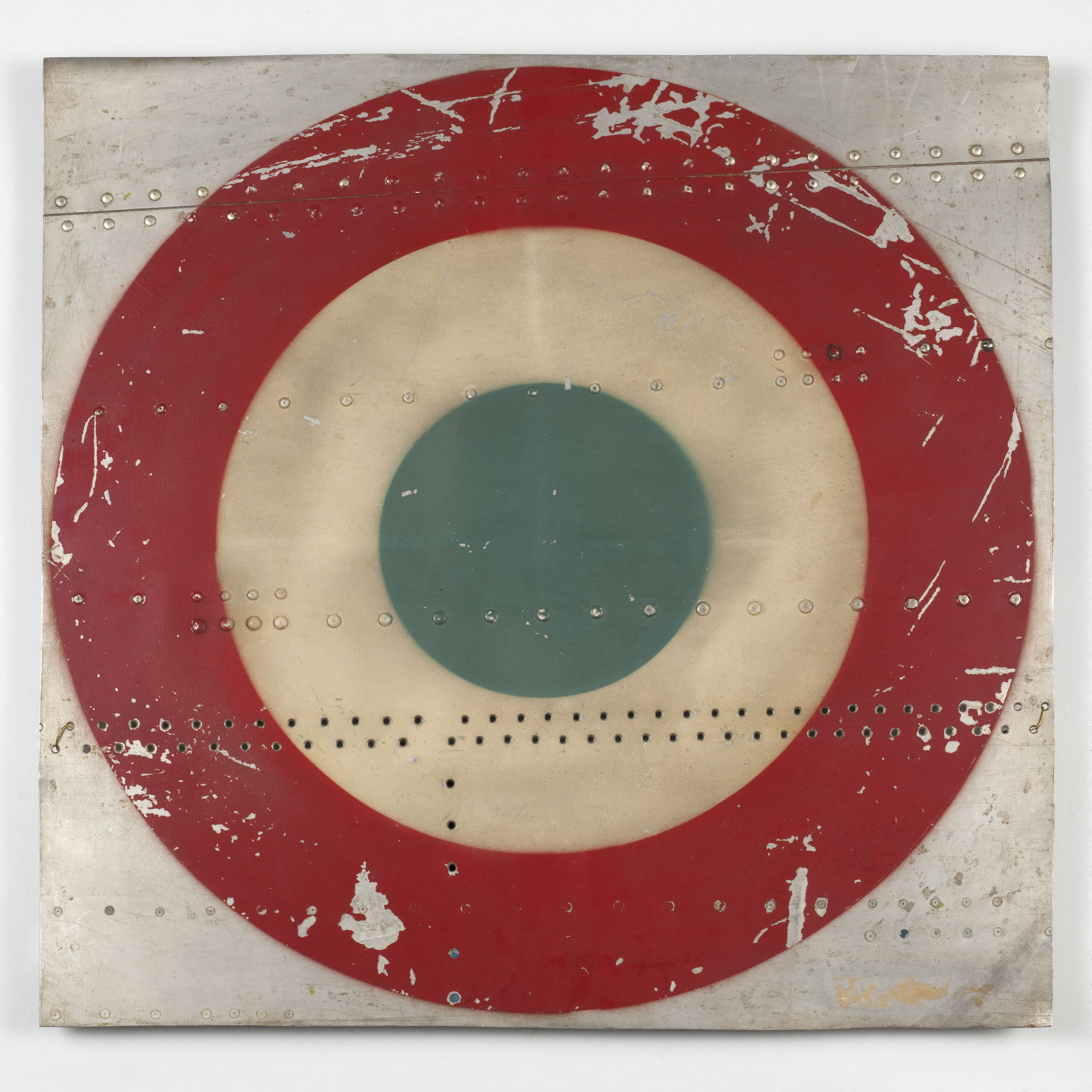
Fragment of sheet metal with a roundel

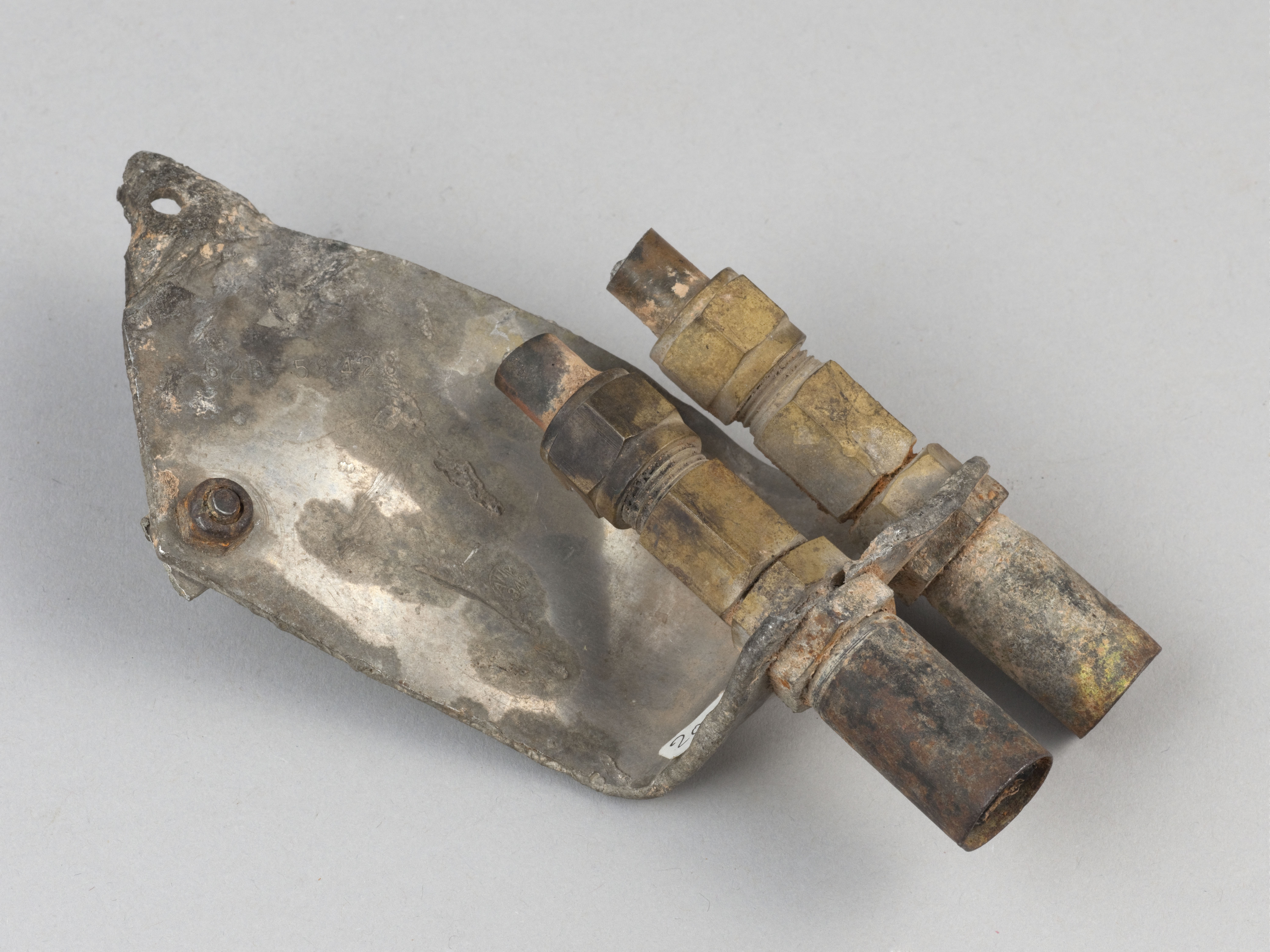
Shredded aluminum plate with two pipe outlets

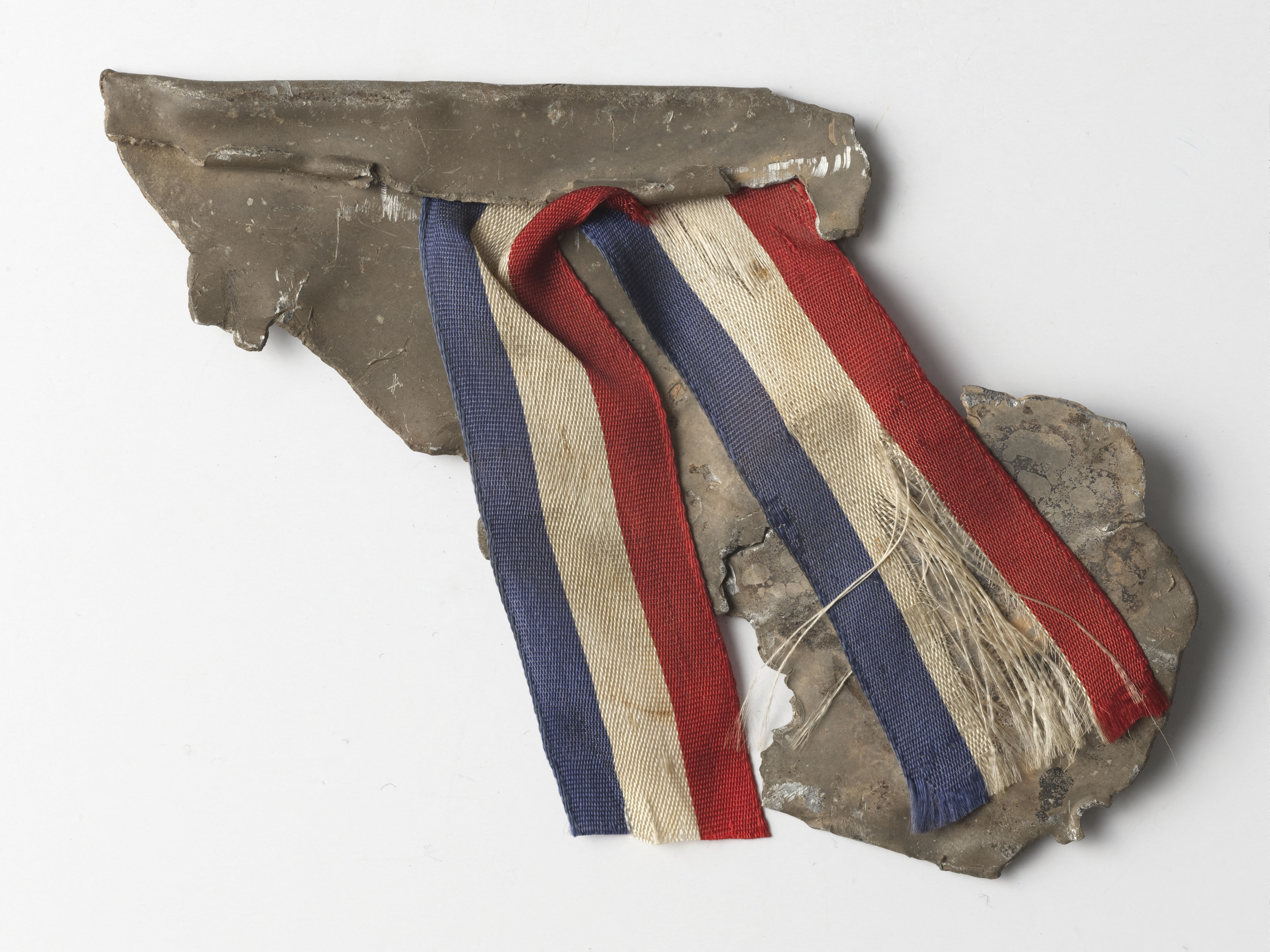
Shredded aluminum plate with a tricolor ribbon

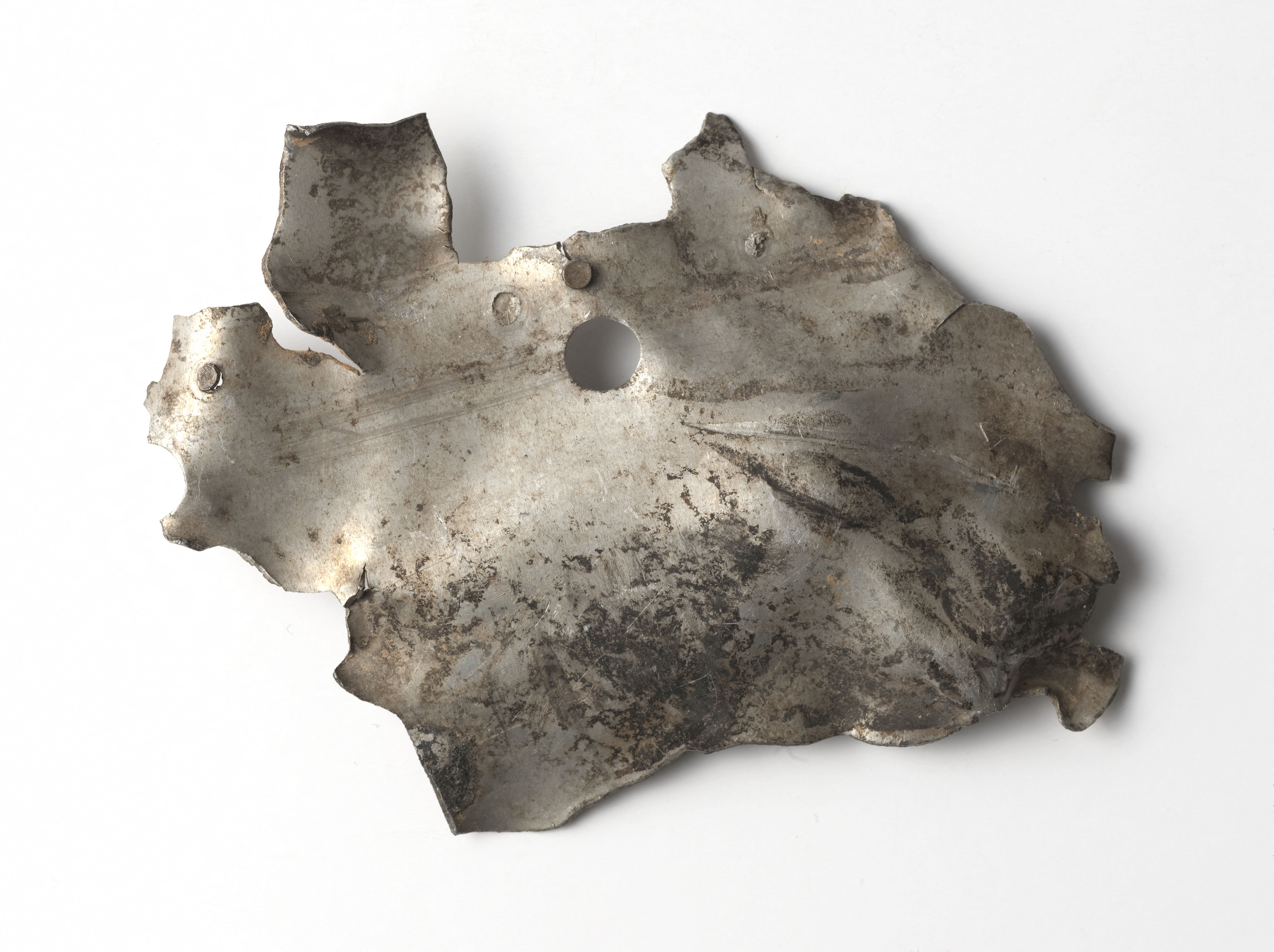
Shredded aluminum plate

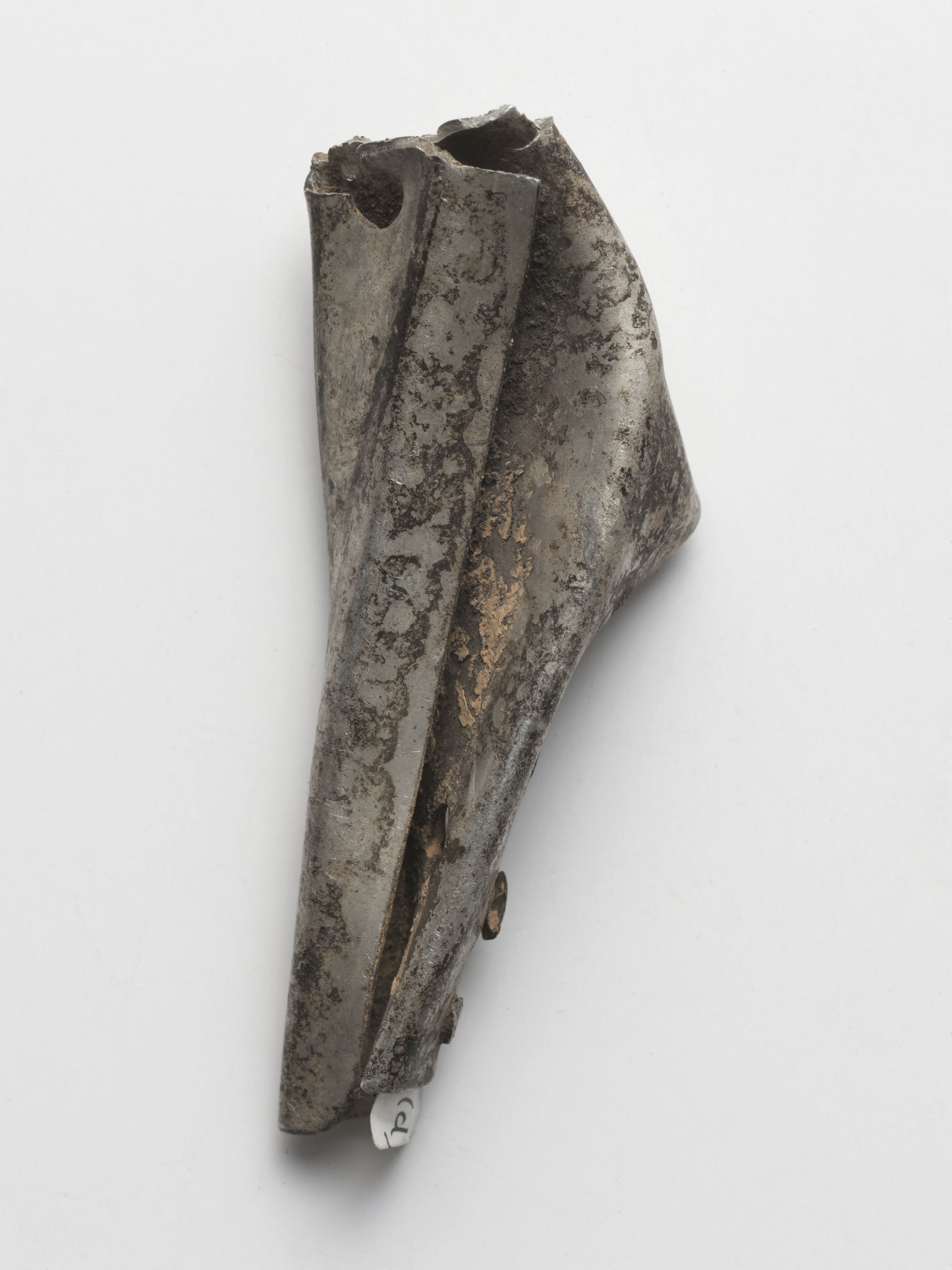
Small piece of twisted aluminum with two rivets

== Sources ==
- Destrem, Maja (1997) [1984]. L'Aventure de Leclerc (in French). Paris: Librairie Arthème Fayard. ISBN 2-213-01419-1.
- Notin, Jean-Christophe (2010) [2005]. Leclerc (Biography). Tempus (in French). Vol. 332. Paris: Perrin. p. 808. ISBN 978-2-262-03294-4. BnF FRBNF42188809.
