= ANESRIF =

Algerian Transport Company

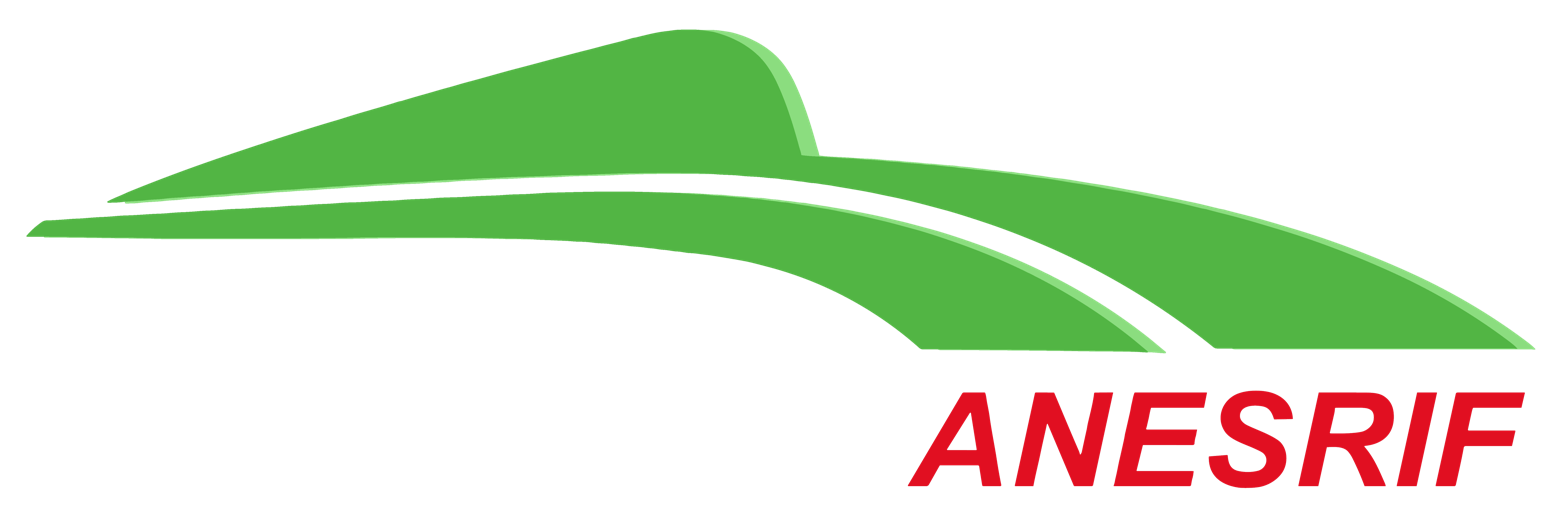
- Type: Établissement Public à caractère Industriel et Commercial
- Founded: 20 July 2005
- Headquarters: Algiers, Algeria
- Key people: Azzedine Fridi (CEO)
- Owner: Government of Algeria
- Number of employees: 716
- Website: www.anesrif.dz

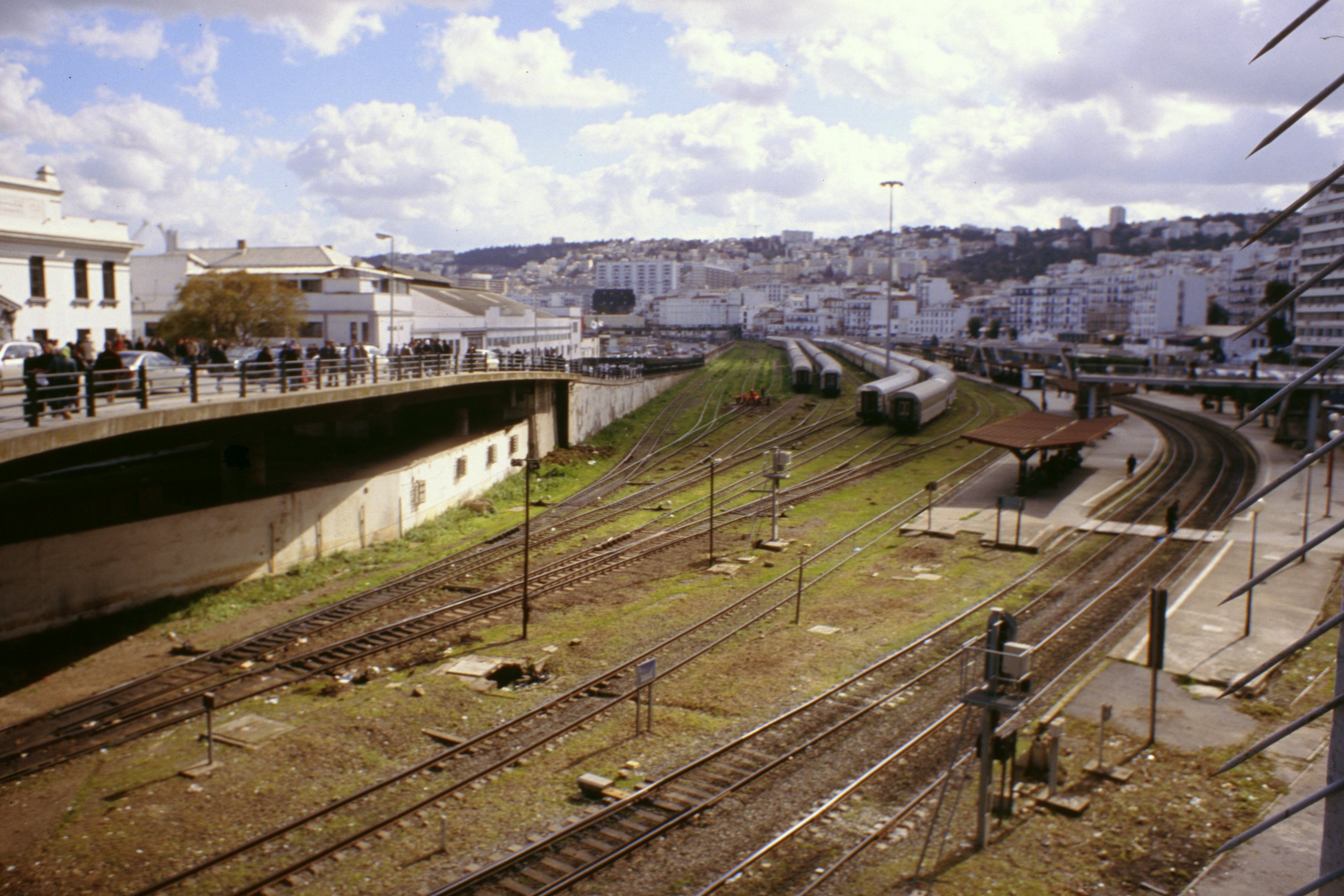
Gare d'Agha train station, in Algiers

ANESRIF (Arabic: الوكالة الوطنية للدراسات ومتابعة إنجاز الإستثمارات في السكك الحديدية) is a transport business created by the government of Algeria, to expand and modernise the Algerian railway system.

== Name ==
ANESRIF's full name, in French, is l’Agence nationale d’études et de suivi de la réalisation des investissements ferroviaires. This translates as the National Agency for Studies and Monitoring of Railway Investment.

== Purpose ==
ANESRIF was founded by the government of Algeria on 20 July 2005, in order to plan and invest in the expansion and modernisation of the country's railways, under the supervision of the Minister of Transport. 900 billion dinars of funding was allocated. SNTF handles the day-to-day operation of the railways. Other businesses, including Alstom and Astaldi, bid for contracts to actually build new lines or install equipment.

ANESRIF is headquartered in Algiers, and it is structured as an Établissement Public à caractère Industriel et Commercial, or "EPIC"; SNTF is an EPIC too. It is an affiliate of the UIC.

Development of Algerian railways, as with aviation, road, and water transport, has been overshadowed by big high-profile projects which are an inefficient use of resources; private sector investment is minimal and productivity of assets and employees is low. This causes problems for the rest of the economy.

Algeria had a 2009–14 economic development plan which allocated €110 billion for infrastructure improvements. However, there are concerns about the government's ability to manage the new capacity, and to put it to good use. Rail development has been based on very old plans – even dating back to the 1970s – assuming demands from heavy industries which never materialised.

== Projects ==
- ANESRIF is developing the High Plateau line, a new railway line spanning Algeria from east to west, supplementing the existing coastal railway;
- A railway from Tlemcen to the Moroccan border at Akid Abbas. The border with Morocco has been closed since 1994, but there is pressure to reopen the border to travellers.
- A southern loop line, connecting Hassi Messaoud – Ouargla – Ghardaia – Laghouat – Djelfa.
- Modernisation and doubling of several existing lines, including Birtouta – Zéralda.
- In 2015, ANESRIF announced a program for moderization, including over constructions of over 5,200 km of new railway lines.
- National Railway Development Program (2026): announces transition of transportation from hydro-carbon based system along Algeria’s Central North–South Corridor.

=== New lines are at the planning stage ===
- Béchar – Mécheria – Redjem;
- High-speed line from Bordj bou Arréridj – Khemis Miliana;
- Boumedfaâ – Djelfa, connecting to the southern loop line;
- Hassi Messaoud – Touggourt.

== See also ==
- Transport in Algeria
