= Mediterranean–Niger Railway =

Technical
- Line length: 275 km (171 mi)
- Track gauge: 1,435 mm (4 ft 8 1/2 in)
- Maximum incline: Adhesion 35 % Rack rail %

The Mediterranean–Niger Railway (MN) (French: Chemins de Fer de la Méditerranée au Niger) was a railway in Western Africa.

The Mediterranean–Niger Railway was built between the coal mining region near Bou Arfa in the east of Morocco and the Algerian rail system at Oujda, completed as a standard gauge route between Oran and Oujda in 1922, while Fes was reached in 1934.

In 1940–1941, construction was begun on the Algerian segment of the Mediterranean–Niger Railway as part of the Trans-Saharan Railway. The line made a connection with the Moroccan segment, which had been completed in 1931, at Bou Arfa and continued into Algeria to connect with the 1,055 mm (3 ft 5 1/2 in) narrow gauge line Oran–Colomb-Béchar built in 1910.

In 1963, Morocco nationalized its railroad system under the name of Moroccan Railways (Office National des Chemins de Fer du Maroc, ONCF). MN was liquidated. The part of MN from the southern border to Colomb-Béchar was closed. Colomb-Béchar was still reached by the narrow gauge line.

== Sources ==
- Bejui, Dominique and Pascal: Exploits et fantasmes transsahariens : 80 ans de traversées sahariennes abouties ou rêvées en auto, en camion, en train et en avion. Chanac: La Regordane, 1994. ISBN 2-906984-19-1
- Guide Michelin, 1956.
- Lartilleux: Géographie des chemins de fer français. vol. 3. Chaix, 1949.
- Pottier, René: Le Transsaharien - Liaison d'Empire. Sorlot, 1941.
- Georges Bouchet: Les voies ferrées de pénétration sahariennes hors Algérie : Le Transsaharien
- List of sources in Mali
- Jean-Claude Faur, "La mise en valeur ferroviaire de l'AOF (1880-1939)" (Universite de Paris: Thèse de doctorat, Faculté de Lettres, 1969)
- Le Transsaharrien
