= High Plateau railway =

Railway lines under construction across Algeria

Overview
- Status: Under construction

Service
- Operator(s): SNTF

Technical
- Track gauge: 1,435 mm (4 ft 8 1/2 in) standard gauge

The High Plateau railway is a network of railway lines under construction across Algeria. The project is managed by Anesrif.

== Route ==
The route runs 1200 km from Tebessa in the east to Moulay Slissen in the west, via Tiaret and M'Sila, through a sparsely populated area bordering the Atlas Mountains and the Sahara. Eighteen new passenger stations are planned. This route incorporates some elements of the existing rail network which will be connected by 630 km of new lines.

Most of Algeria's existing rail network is further north, along the coast. So the "inland" route allows traffic to bypass the main Rocade Nord route through Constantine, Algiers, and Oran. This project is hand in hand with Anesrif's other plans to improve Algeria's 4000 km of existing railways.

A further stretch of railway will run from Tlemcen to a new station at Maghina and then to the Moroccan border at Akid Abbas. The border with Morocco has been sealed since 1994, but there is pressure to reopen the border to travellers.

== Specification ==
The route is mostly being built for 160 km/h (99 mph) running; the line near the Moroccan border is designed for higher speeds. The railway is standard gauge (even though it crosses some existing 1,055 mm (3 ft 5 1/2 in) gauge lines) and mostly single-track.

There is provision for 25 kV electrification in the future. GSM-R will be used for communications.

== Project ==
The project is being managed by Anesrif, an Algerian state agency which is undertaking several large projects to revitalise railways and build new infrastructure. Anesrif has awarded contracts to various consortia.

Once in operation, the railway will be operated by SNTF.

- In May 2010, a contract was awarded to build a 185 km section of railway from Tissemsilt-Tiaret-Relizane, for 160 km/h running; it is designed with future electrification in mind.
- In March 2011, Anesrif awarded a contract to build the railway from Tlemcen to the Moroccan border.
- As of March 2011, Alstom was already constructing the 120 km section between Saida and Moulay Slissen.
- Work was expected to begin on the 153 km Saida-Tiaret line in the summer of 2011.

== Development ==
The east-west High Plateau railway incorporates some elements of existing Algerian lines, although away from the coast, existing infrastructure has mostly been north–south.

- The Tebessa-Annaba line largely operates independently, hauling iron ore and phosphates to a port on the coast; there have been proposals to spin it off as a private concession.
- There was already a line from Ain M'lilla to Barika, part of an oil export chain from Touggourt, developed by France during the colonial era.

As existing railways in Algeria are poorly utilised, despite expensive investments in the past, there have been concerns about the authorities' ability to manage capacity appropriately. Away from the coast, Algeria is sparsely populated, although cities are expected to grow as a result of improved infrastructure; this has already happened in Tiaret.

== See also ==
- List of railway lines in Algeria
