= SNTF =

Algeria's national railway operator

National Rail Transportation Company
- Native name: الشركة الوطنية للنّقل بالسّكك الحديدية
- Type: State-owned
- Industry: Rail transport
- Founded: 31 March 1976
- Headquarters: Algiers, Algeria
- Area served: Algeria, Tunisia, Morocco
- Products: Rail transport, Cargo, transport, Service, more...
- Revenue: 4.5 billion DZD
- Number of employees: 12,933
- Subsidiaries: STPE; STIM; Rail Express; RailLINK; STG; RailPUB; RailLOgistic; Rail Télecom; Safei; Restaurail; Infrarail; Rail Electr; Estel Rail
- Website: sntf.dz

National Rail Transportation Company Société Nationale des Transports Ferroviaires الشركة الوطنية للنّقل بالسّكك الحديدية
- SNTF, votre partenaire idéal (French: SNTF, your ideal partner)

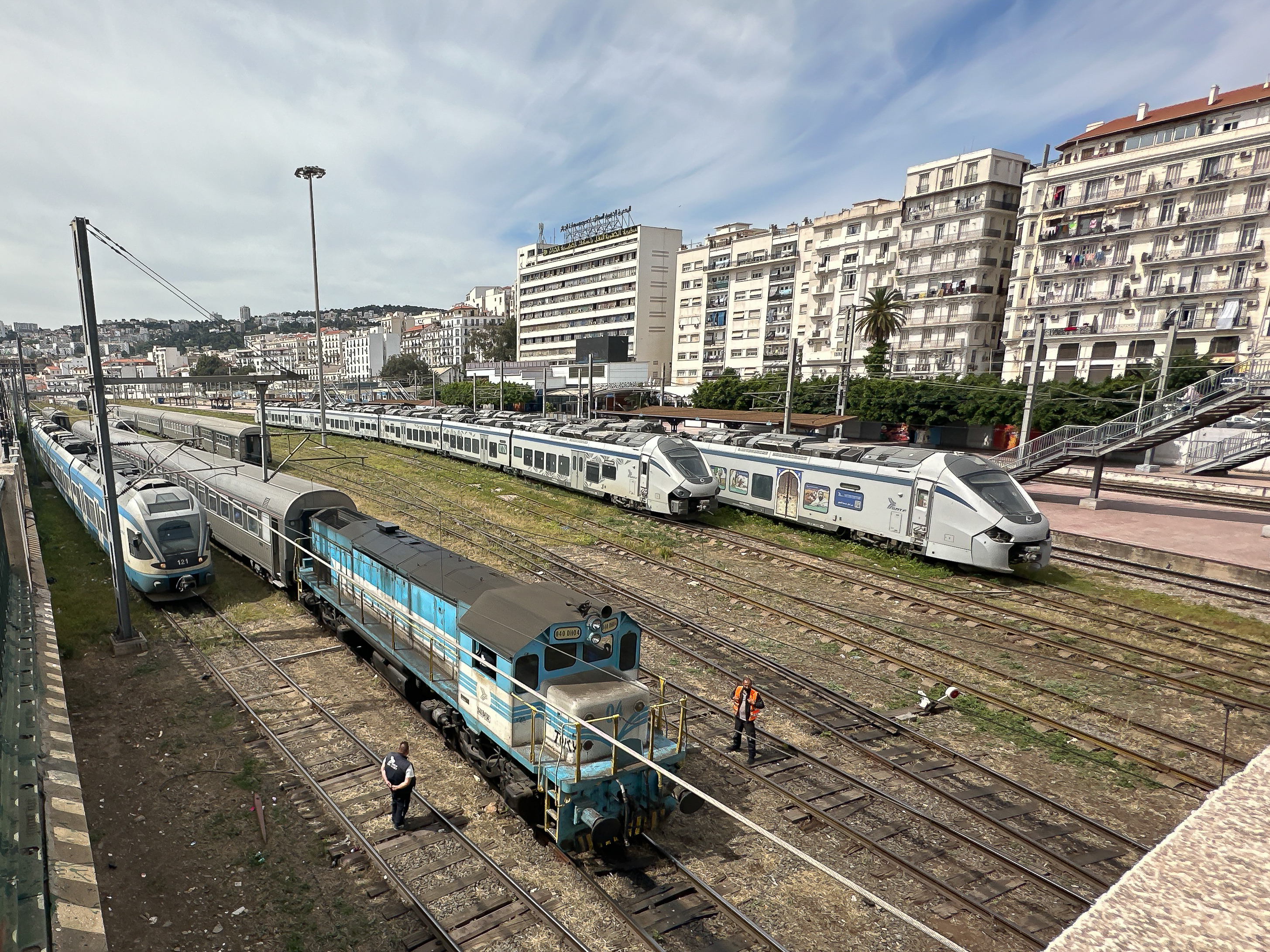
- SNTF trains at Agha Station in 2025

Track gauge
- 1,435 mm (4 ft 8 1/2 in) standard gauge: 4,200 km (2,600 mi)
- 1,055 mm (3 ft 5 1/2 in): 1,085 km (674 mi)

Electrification
- Main: Voltage Overhead

Features
- No. of tunnels: 137
- No. of bridges: 7800
- No. of stations: 410

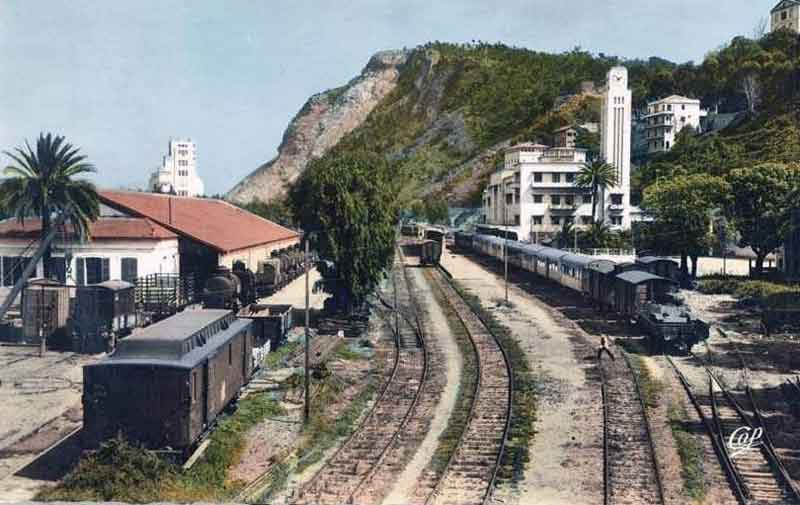
Skikda Station (20th century)

The SNTF (French: Société nationale des transports ferroviaires, lit. 'National company for railway transport'; Arabic: الشركة الوطنية للنّقل بالسّكك الحديدية, al-Sharikah al-Waṭanīyah llnnql bālsskk al-ḥadīdīyah, Tifinagh: ⵜⴰⵙⵎⵓⵏⵜ ⵜⴰⵖⴻⵍⵏⴰⵡⵜ ⵏ ⵓⵎⴻⵔⵏⵉ ⴰⴱⵔⵓⵣⵣⴰⵍ) is Algeria's national railway operator. SNTF, a state-owned company, currently has a monopoly over Algeria's rail network of 3,973 km (2,469 mi), and it is currently utilising 3,572 km (2,220 mi) of that (about 90 per cent). Out of the total railway network, 2,888 km (1,795 mi) are 1,435 mm (4 ft 8 1/2 in) standard gauge (283 km or 176 mi of these are electrified) and 1,085 km (674 mi) are 1,055 mm (3 ft 5 1/2 in) narrow gauge (as of 2008).

== History ==
=== The beginnings ===
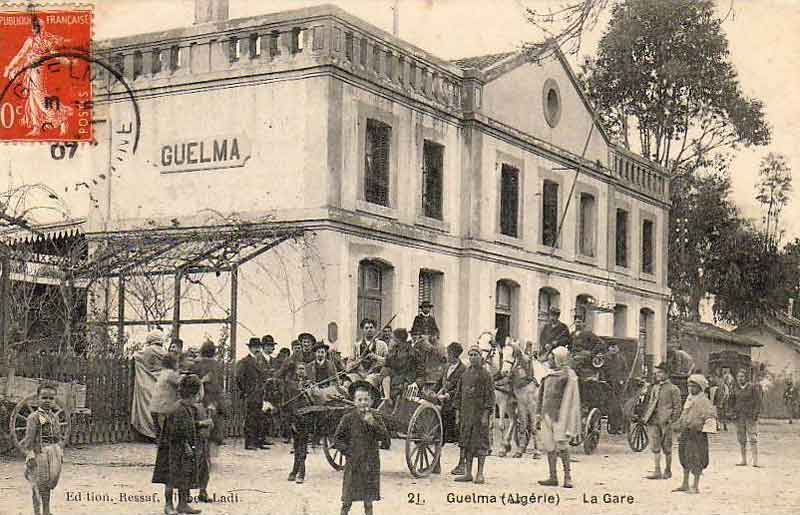
People gather in front of Guelma train station (19th century postcard)

The history of the railway in Algeria began with the colonisation of the country by France. On 8 April 1857, a decree ordered the creation of 1,357 km (843 mi) of railways, beginning with the construction of a standard gauge line from Algiers to Blida, which started on 12 December 1859. The French private company Compagnie des chemins de fer algériens started working on the line with the help of the French army on 11 July 1860. Around the same time, the company obtained permission to create an Oran-Sig line and a Constantine-Skikda line. However, due to economic difficulties, only the Algiers-Blida line was finished, and it was subsequently opened to the public on 8 September 1862. Afterwards, 5 other companies started the construction of new lines:

- La Compagnie Bône - Guelma (BG)
- La Compagnie de l'Est Algérien (EA) (Eastern Algeria)
- La Compagnie Paris - Lyon - Méditerranée (PLM)
- La Compagnie de l'Ouest Algérien (OA) (Western Algeria)
- La Compagnie Franco - Algérienne (FA)

Between 1857 and 1878, the following lines (or parts of them) were finished, totalling 1,365 km (848 mi), which exceeded initial expectations:

- Annaba - Berrahal
- Annaba - Bouchegouf - Guelma
- El Khroub - Oued Zenati
- Constantine - Skikda
- Constantine - Sétif
- Algiers - Thénia
- Algiers - Oran
- Arzew - La Macta - Mohammedia
- Mohammadia - Mécheria
- Oued Tlélat-Sidi Bel Abbès

=== Nationalisation ===
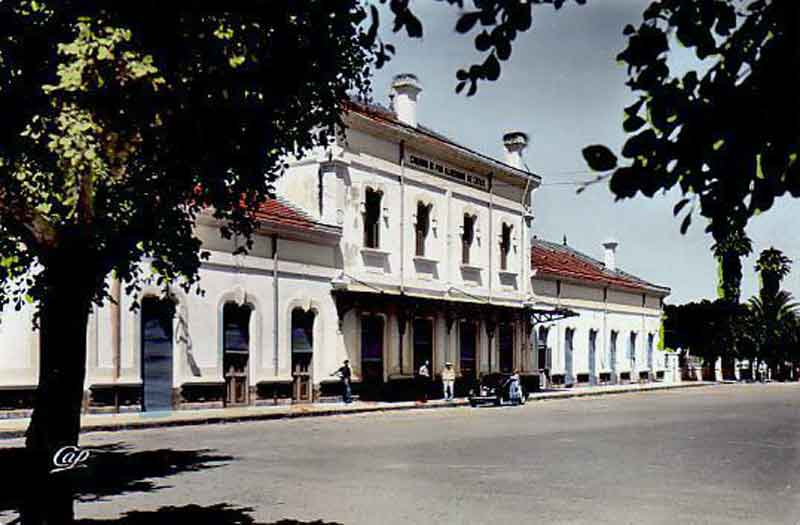
Mohammedia's train station (20th century)

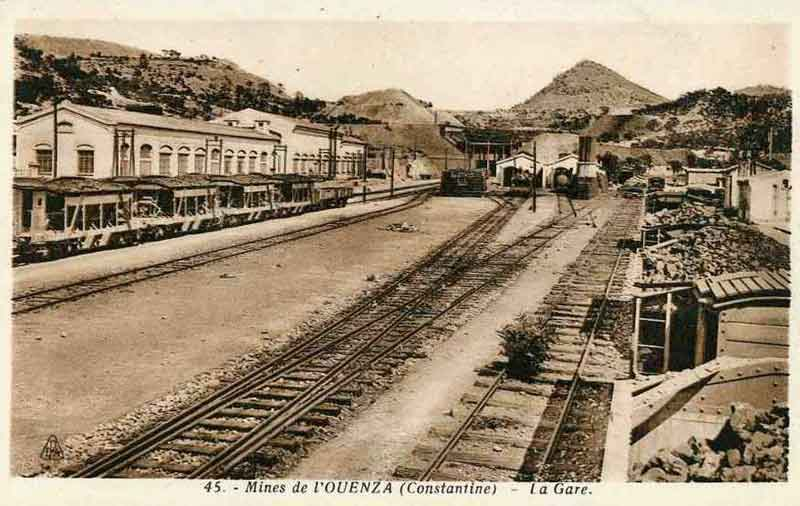
Ouenza's station, primarily for ore from the Société de l'Ouenza iron mines

After 1879, France divided the railway lines being built into categories of local interest or of general interest, with only the latter being eligible to receive state funding. The 18 July 1879 decree defined the extent of some "general interest" lines and ordered the construction of a further 1,747 km (1,086 mi) of railways to expand the existing network. Between 1879 and 1906, the following lines (or parts of them) were finished, totalling 2,035 km (1,264 mi):

- Souk Ahras—Tébessa—Le Kouif—Tunisian border
- Berrahal—Ramdane Djamel
- Ouled Rahmoune—Khenchela
- El Guerrah—Biskra
- Sétif—Thénia with further lines to include Tizi Ouzou, Béjaia and Sour El-Ghozlane
- Blida—Berrouaghia
- Mostaganem—Relizane—Tiaret
- Oran—Arzew
- Es Sénia—Aïn Témouchent
- Sidi Bel Abbès—Tlemcen—Moroccan border
- Tabia—Crampel
- Méchéria—Béchar
- Tizi—Mascara

In 1946, Algeria's total railway network comprised a total of 5,014 km (3,116 mi) of active lines, in addition to mine lines, significantly more than the current network. After a while, the private companies were unable to maintain economic stability, which led the French government to buy the Franco - Algérienne, Est Algérien, Bône-Guelma and Ouest Algérien in 1900, 1908, 1905 and 1920 respectively.

On 27 September 1912, the state-owned Compagnie des Chemins de Fer Algériens de l'Etat (CFAE) assumed control of all lines, except those owned by the Compagnie Paris - Lyon - Méditerranée. On 1 July 1921, the CFAE and PLM agreed to share the Algerian railway network with the PLM operating the Algiers-Oran, Oran-Aïn Témouchent, Sidi Bel Abbès-Tlemcen-Oujda-Crampel, Blida-Hassi Bahbah lines (effectively Western Algeria) while the CFAE operated the rest.

On 30 May 1938, both companies were incorporated into the newly founded SNCF, which operated all of France's railway network, with the Algerian network becoming a région. On 1 January 1939, the Office des Chemins de fer Algériens (Office CFA) was created, focusing on the Algerian network.

On 30 June 1959, an agreement was made between the French government and the OCFA leading to the creation of the Société des Chemins de Fer Français en Algérie which commenced operations on 1 January 1, 1960. This new company operated Algeria's railways until its replacement by the Société Nationale des Chemins de Fer Algériens (SNCFA) on 16 June 1963, a year after Algeria's independence.

=== Post-Independence ===
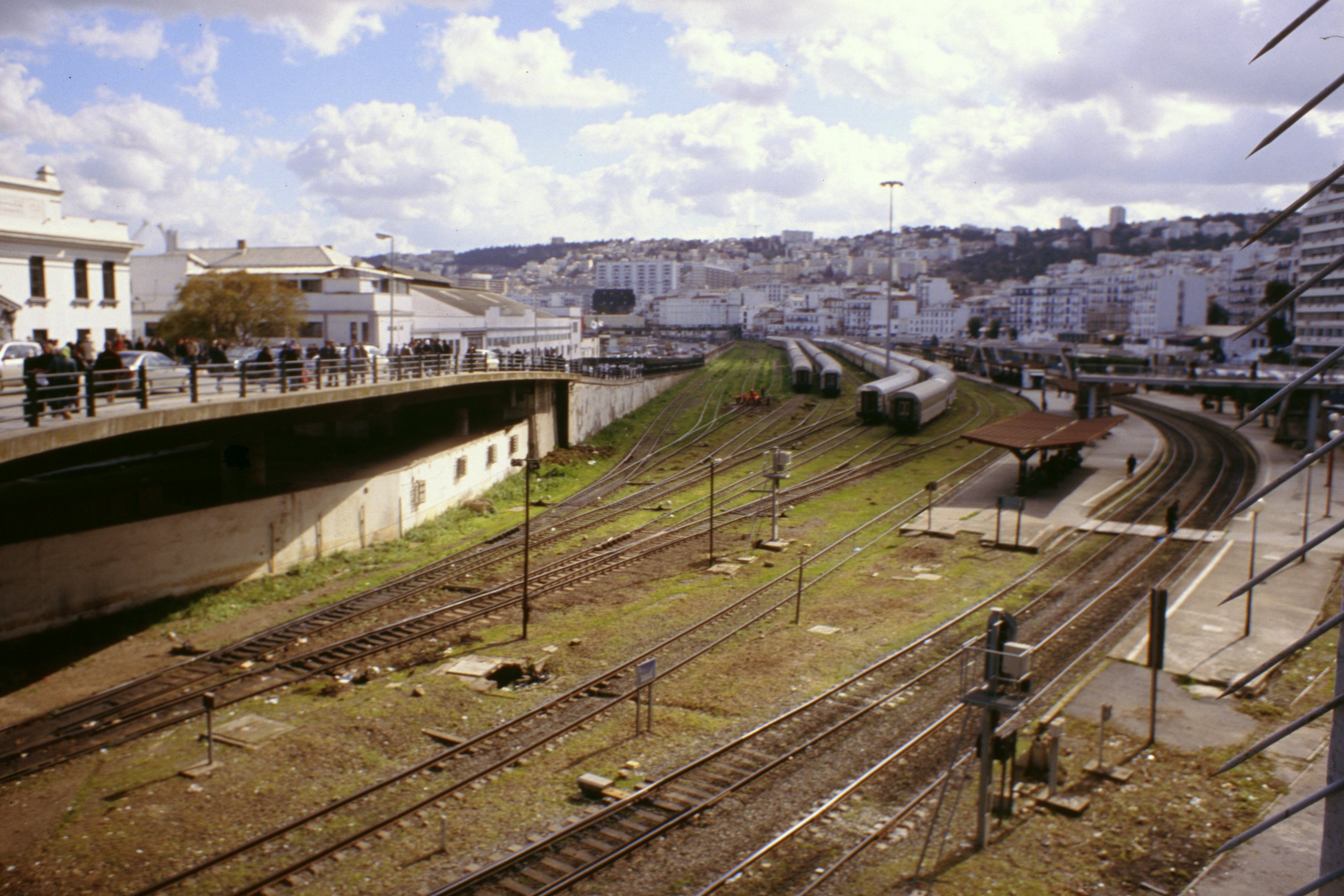
Train station Gare d’Agha at Algiers

On 30 March 1976, the SNCFA split into the following companies:

- SNTF, for the operation and maintenance of the lines;
- SNERIF, for the renewal and extension of the network;
- SIF, for the engineering and modernisation of the infrastructure.

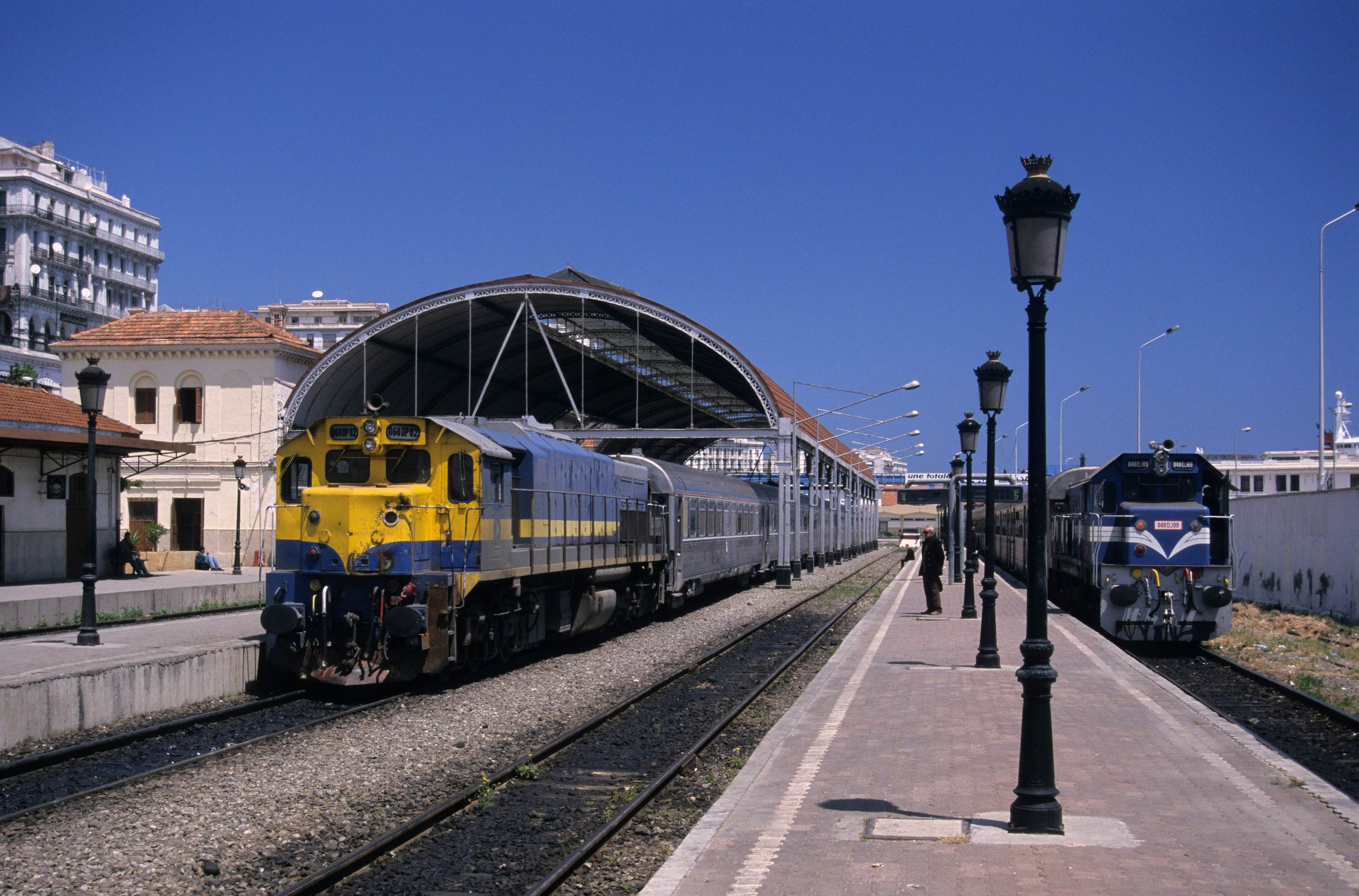
Long distance train to Constantine and commuter train in station Algier on 8. May 2001

This reorganisation was intended to improve the railway network and services in Algeria, however it proved unsuccessful, and the two latter companies were reintegrated into the SNTF. In 1980, a convention for the relations between the Algerian state and the SNTF was signed, officially called decree N° 88-128 of 28 June 1988. This convention is still in effect and regulates the salaries of the workers and the maintenance of the infrastructure, and bears similarities with the June 1959 convention. In December 1990, the SNTF became an Établissement Public à caractère Industriel et Commercial (EPIC).

=== Recent investments ===
Large investment programs were launched after 1980 to improve the Algerian railway network, such as the construction of the Jijel-Ramdane-Djamel line (140 km or 87 mi), the Béni Saf area railway, providing transportation for its cement plant (23 km or 14 mi), and in the Saïda (23 km) and Aïn Touta areas (15 km or 9.3 mi).

In addition to that, about 1,400 km (870 mi) of track were replaced, both the track ballast and the railway ties, as well as the duplication of the tracks of the Rocade Nord in Algiers (about 200 km or 120 mi). Many train stations all over the country were modernised or even reconstructed, and there were also many improvements to the railways in the vicinities of Algiers and Annaba.

A new, separate organisation, Anesrif, has been created to manage infrastructure investment whilst SNTF concentrates on day-to-day operations. Anesrif has awarded a series of contracts to build new infrastructure and upgrade existing lines, including the construction of a single-track line from Relizane to Tiaret and Tissemsilt, forming part of the High Plateau line.

== Rolling stock ==
As of 2017, SNTF's rolling stock inventory consisted of:

- 258 Locomotives
- 10,129 Railway cars
- 380 Passenger cars
- 17 Alstom Coradia - built at De Dietrich Ferroviaire plant in Reichshoffen, France
- 17 CAF TDMD S/599
- 64 Stadler Flirt
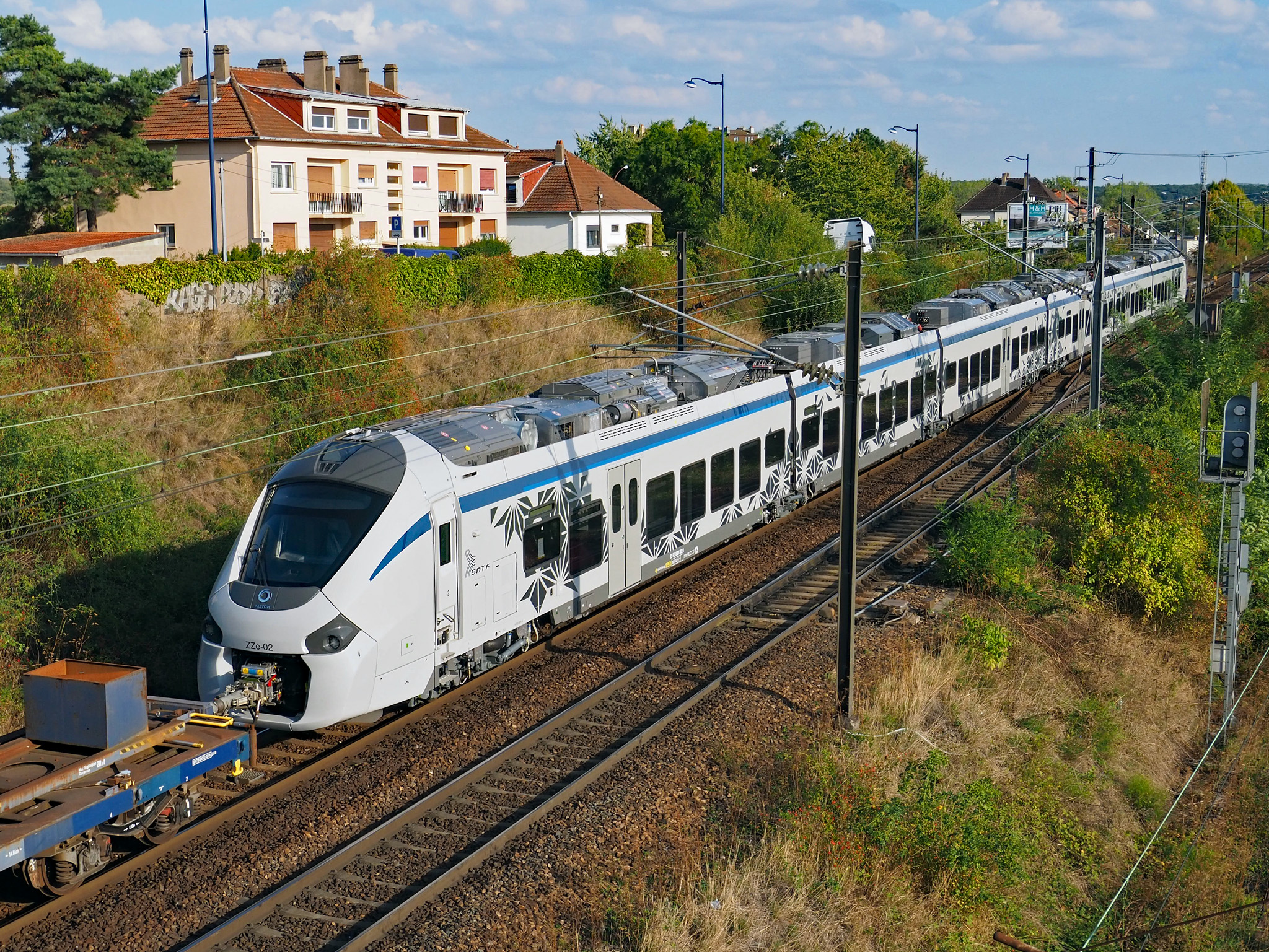
Mainline train Alstom Coradia ZZe-02

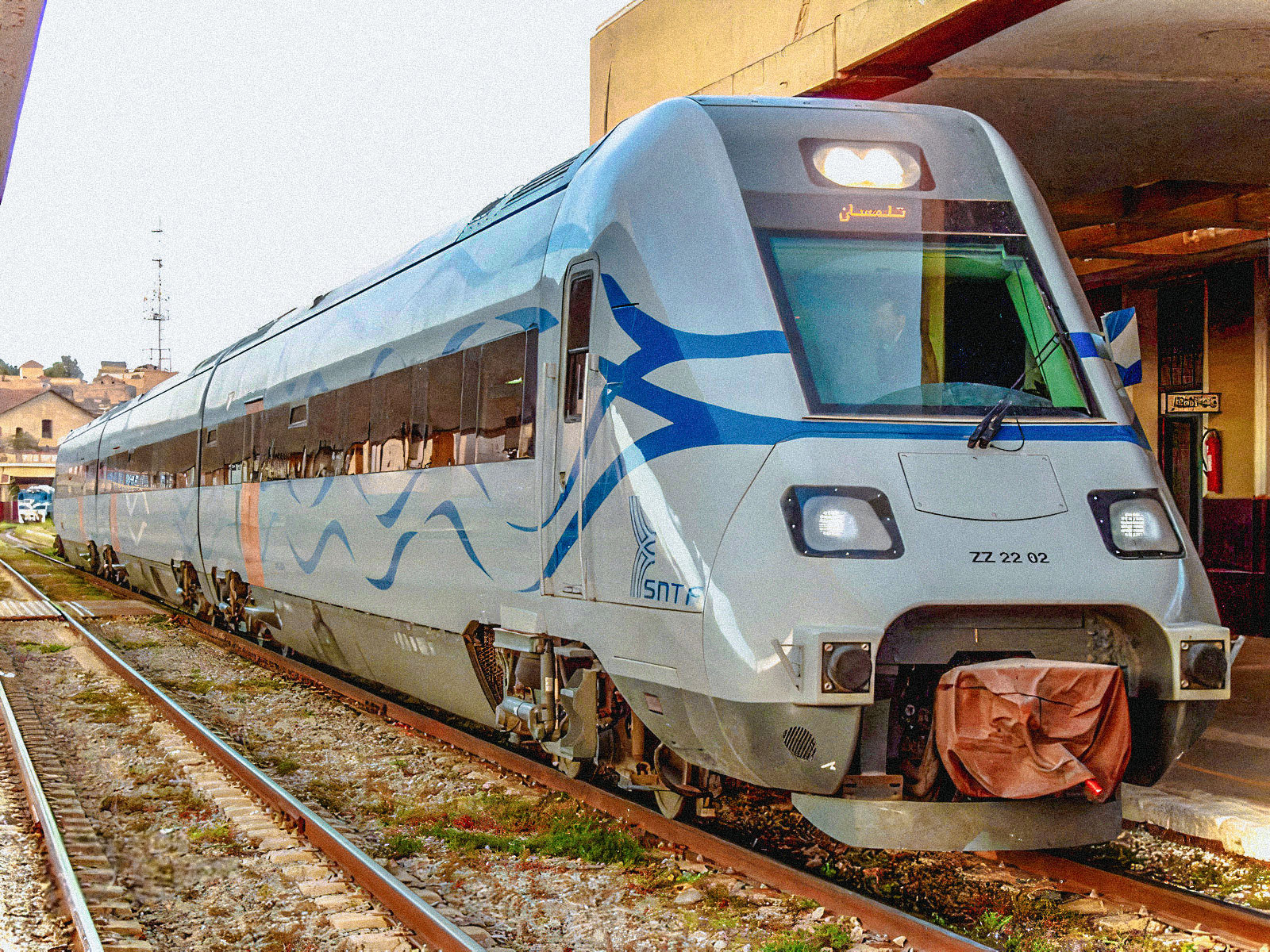
CAF Regional rail "Inter-villes" Autorail TDMD S/599

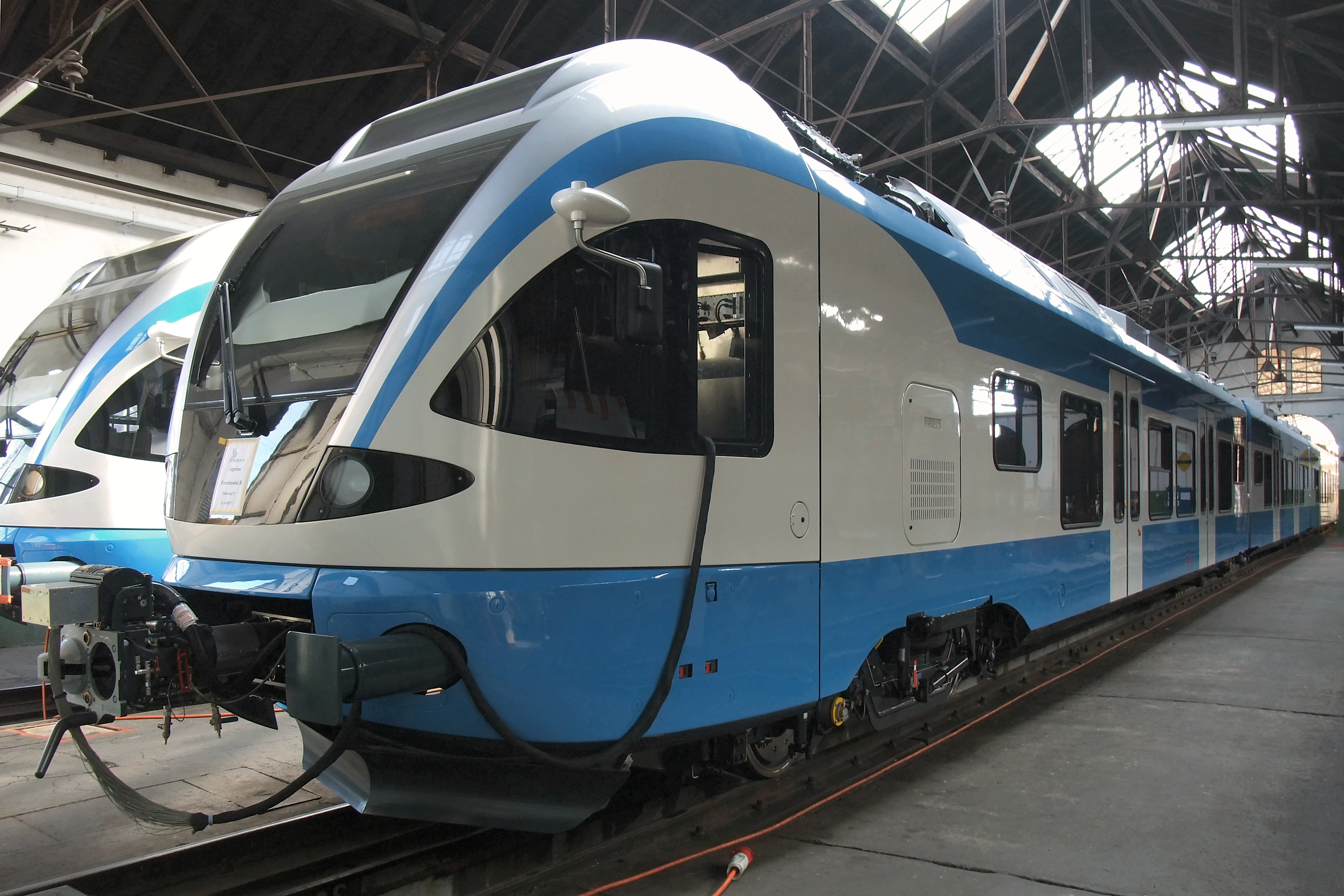
Commuter rail Stadler Flirt

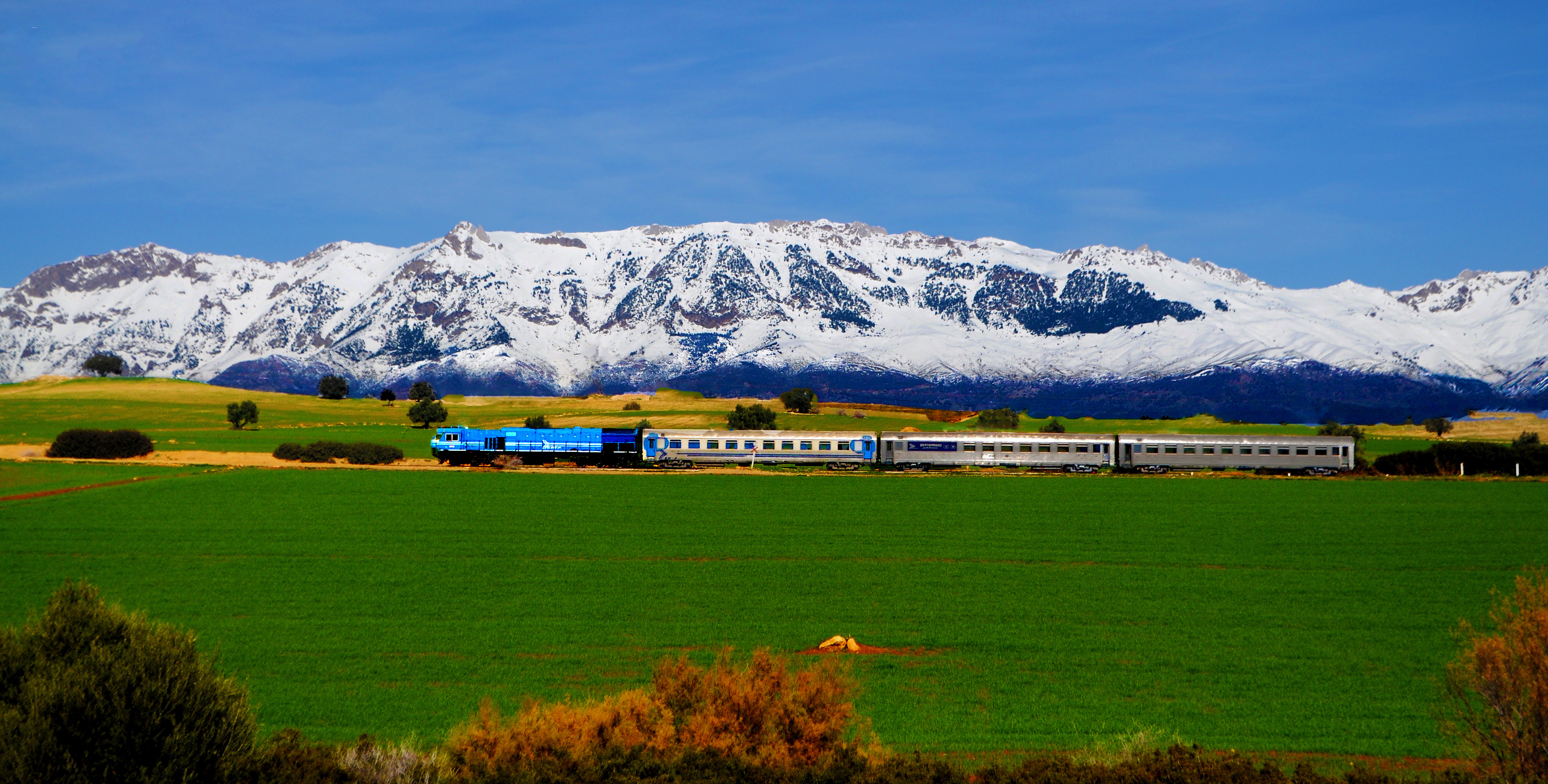
Locomotive GT36HCW with passenger cars

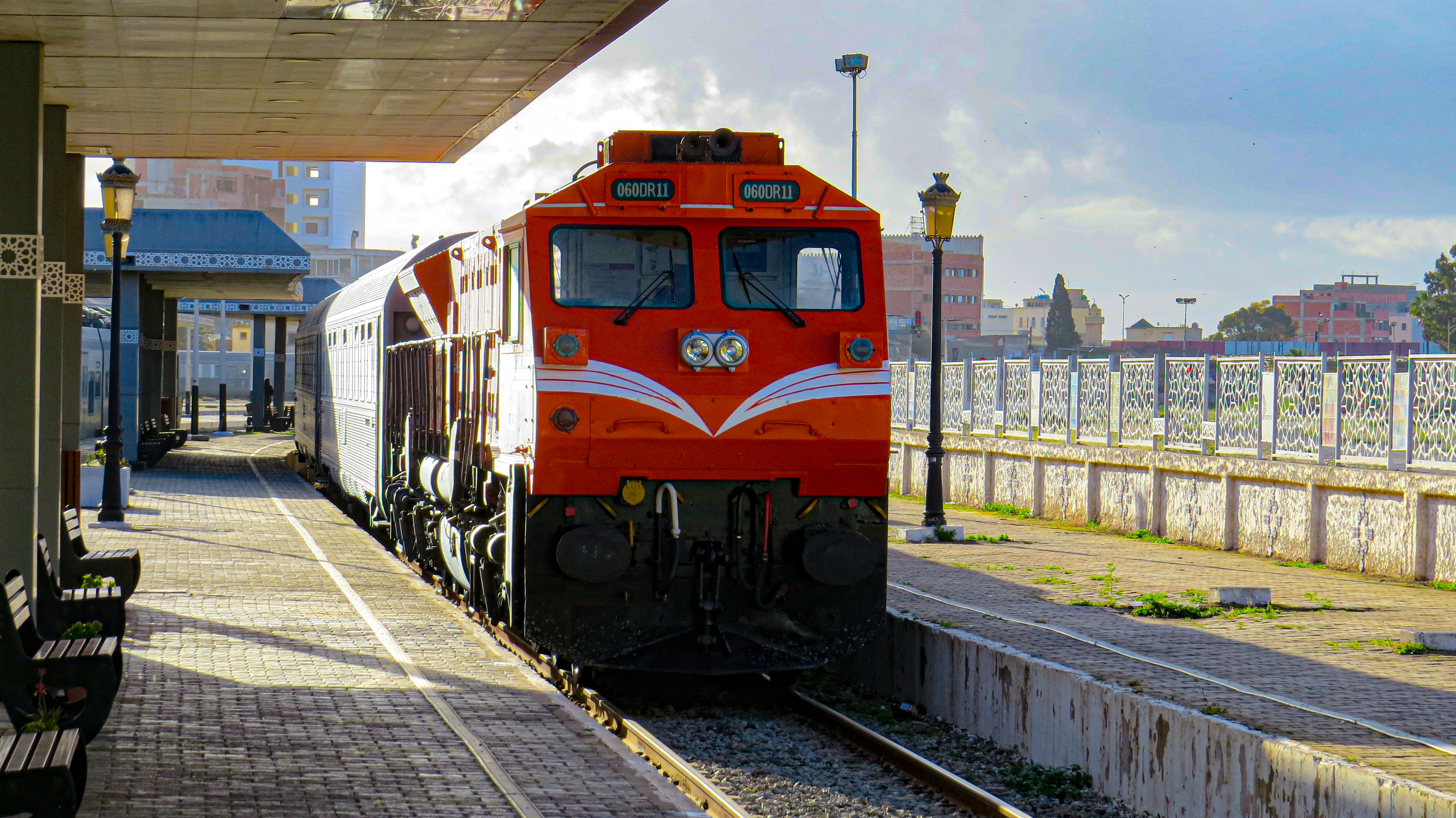

== Railway links to adjacent countries ==
1,435 mm (4 ft 8 1/2 in) gauge links were built to both Morocco and Tunisia. The Algeria-Tunisia railway resumed operation in August 2024, after several years of closure, while the land border with Morocco has been closed since 1994.

== Affiliations ==
The SNTF is a member of the following organisations:

- African Union of Railways
- Arab Union of Railways
- Comité du Transport Ferroviaire Maghrebin (CTFM) (has its headquarters in Algiers)
- International Union of Railways (UIC)

== See also ==
- History of rail transport in Algeria
- Similar gauges
