= Trans-Saharan Railway =

Unfinished colonial railway project

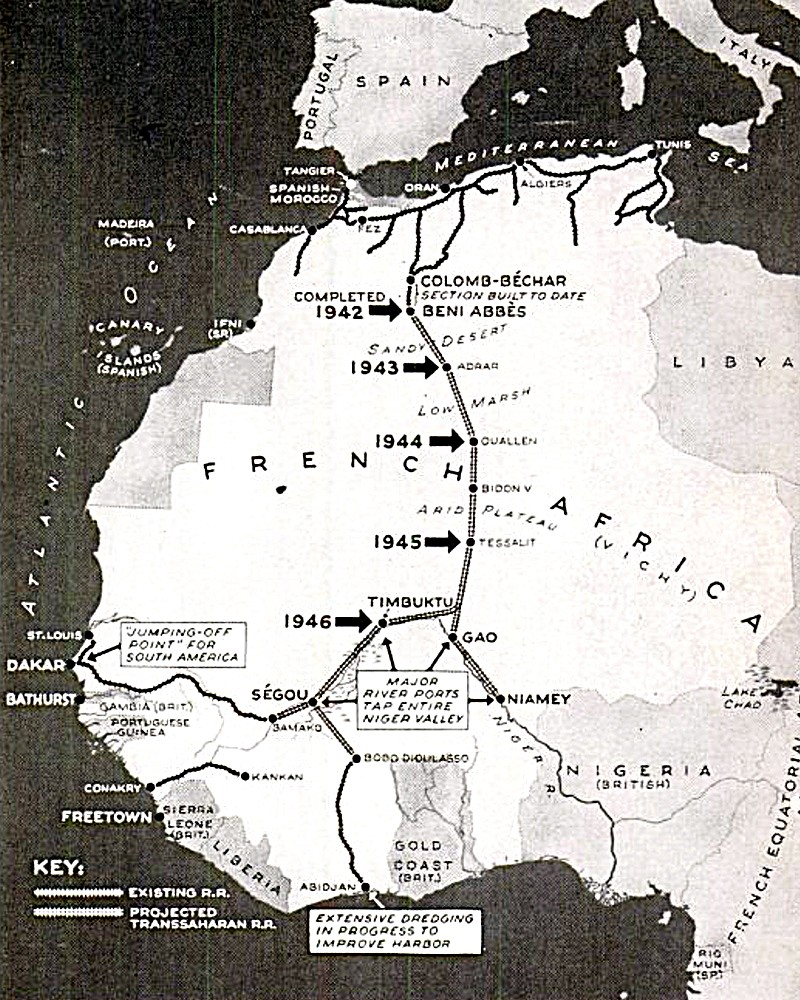
A map of completed and proposed sections of the railway, c. 1942

The Trans-Saharan Railway was a project conducted by France to build a rail line south through Algeria to sub-Saharan Africa. First proposed in 1879, limited construction occurred during 1941–1942, by the use of forced labor during World War II under Vichy France.

== History ==
The railway's original intended use was to connect coal mines and boost trade throughout North Africa, tie together the French Empire, and connect North Africa to sub-Saharan Africa, by connecting the existing rail system of French Algeria to those of French West Africa. The plan for the rail line was first proposed in 1879. The Chamber of Deputies allocated 800,000 francs for an expedition, but the Flatters expedition, named after its leader Paul Flatters, ended in failure when the survey team was massacred by Tuareg in 1881. An engineer, Monsieur A. Duponchel, was the creator of the large plan; in 1900, French paper Le Matin announced that it would proceed by private initiative following a long campaign in its favour by Pierre Paul Leroy-Beaulieu.

However, it wasn't until the Vichy France government that the plan was actively promoted. It was viewed as a way to increase the integrity of the French Empire and the spirit of the French nation as a whole.

The railway had numerous proposed benefits. It would provide a fast connection to the Sudan region and allow its resources to be within France's reach. Additionally, the railway was supposed to transform the region and make it a leading producer in cotton and agricultural goods. The cattle population and rice production would increase dramatically and benefit society.

World War II coincided with the construction of the railway (Note: Work during World War II expanded the existing Mediterranean–Niger Railway, which dated to the early 1920s in French Morocco and French Algeria.) which led to it being built by slave labor in 1941–1942. Forced labor camps were dispersed throughout the country and the trans-Saharan railroad project connected them. Jews, Spanish Republican exiles and other prisoners were forced to work on the project. The workers "were poorly fed and housed, and lived in terrible sanitary conditions. Tortures and atrocities were inflicted by the guards for the slightest breach of the rules; the internees were not treated as human beings. Many died from beatings; even more died from outbreaks of typhus or just from exhaustion and hunger."

Ultimately, the trans-Saharan railway was never completed; only a small portion of the tracks was built. Construction stopped in 1944 due to lack of financial support, and in 1945 continuation was officially rejected.

== Gallery ==
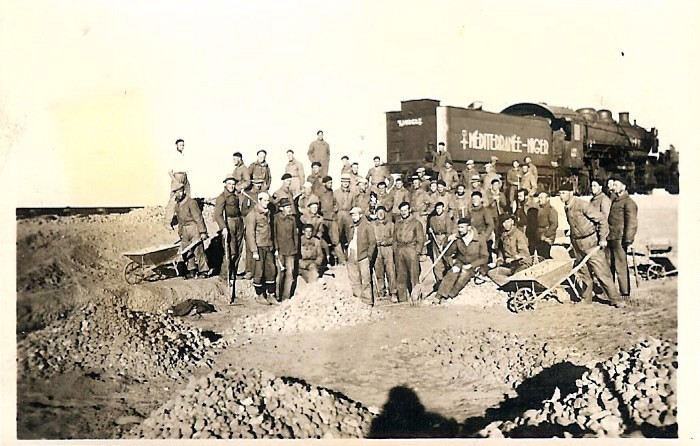
Enslaved laborers used for the project; the tender in the background carries the markings of the Mediterranean–Niger Railway

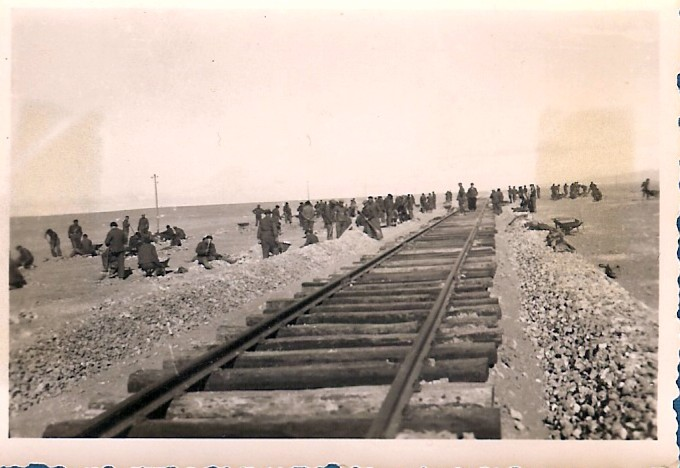
A section of track under construction

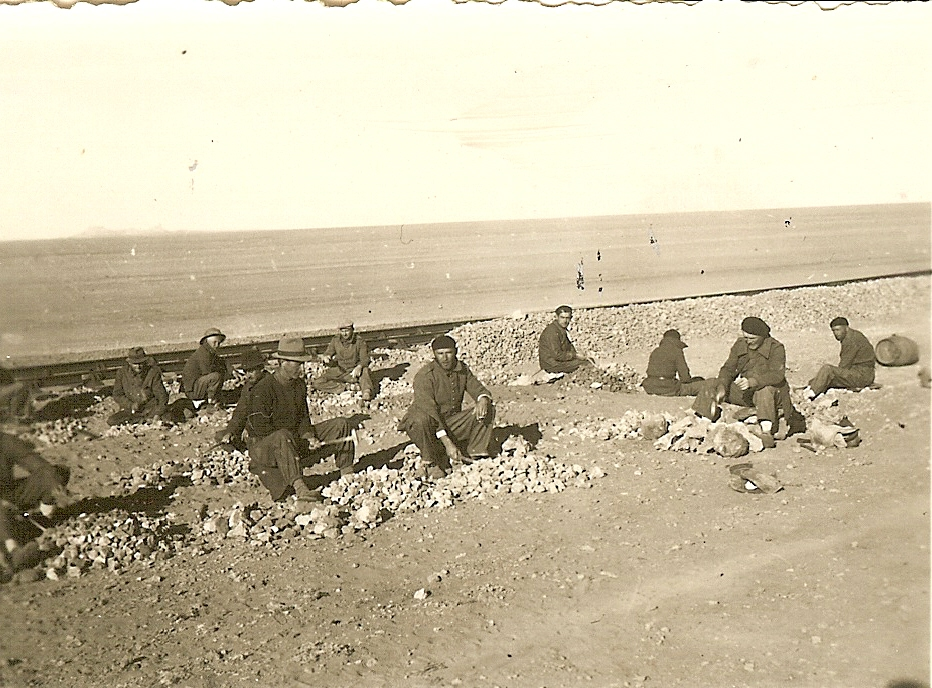
A work crew of forced laborers

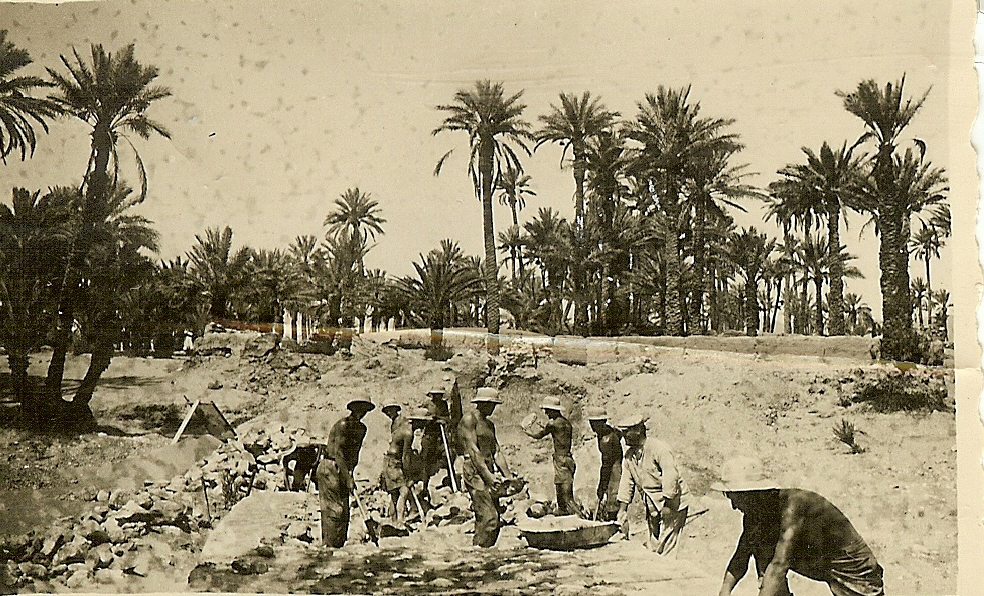
Workers apparently constructing an embankment

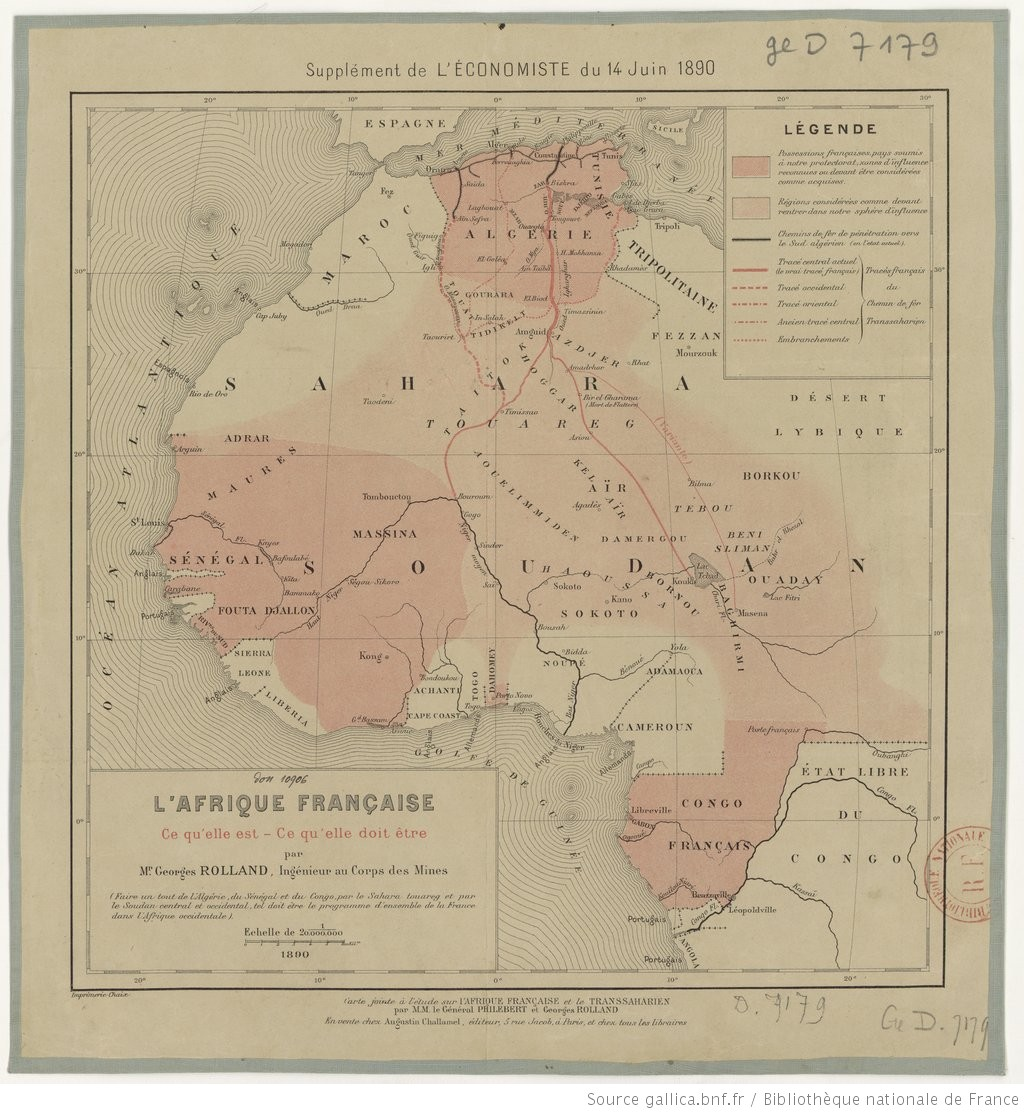
The railway as proposed by Georges Rolland, a French engineer and a member of the Corps des mines

== See also ==
- General Leclerc's aviation accident, which occurred near the railway in November 1947
- Trans-Sahara Highway
