= Benzireg =

- Village
- Location within Algeria
- Coordinates: 31°55′23″N 1°50′27″W
- Country: Algeria
- Province: Béchar Province
- District: Béchar District
- Commune: Béchar
- Elevation: 957 m (3,140 ft)
- Time zone: UTC+1 (CET)

Benzireg is a village in the commune of Béchar, in Béchar District, Béchar Province, Algeria. The village is located on the N6 national highway and the Méchéria-Béchar railway 50 kilometres (31 mi) northeast of Béchar.
