= Pascal Bejui =

- Born: 20 November 1953; Lyon (France)
- Died: 24 September 2023 (aged 69); Oyonnax (France)

Pascal Bejui (November 20, 1953, Lyon – September 24, 2023, Oyonnax) was a French expert in trains and railways, a railfan, writer, cameraman, reporter, and publisher.

== Biography ==
Pascal René Claude Bejui was born on November 20, 1953, in Lyon, France's 6th arrondissement. He was the grandson of a mechanic who worked for the Compagnie des chemins de fer Bône-Guelma. Later, he relocated to La Roche-Blanche. During his childhood, he developed a fascination for steam trains that passed by his grandparents' apartment in Antibes.

He embarked on his career as a cameraman at Télé Monte-Carlo. Subsequently, he established La Régordane, a publishing house through which he released his own works. Delving into the realm of audiovisual production, he published VHS tapes and DVDs of the magazine Média Train, along with several films highlighting railways.

Later on, Bejui ventured into the world of journalism. He played a pivotal role as the founder of Objectif Rail magazine and served as the editor-in-chief and layout artist for the magazine Le Train Nostalgie until his death.

In 2019, he generously donated the raw footage of his videos to La Fédération des amis des chemins de fer secondaires (FACS).

Bejui died on September 24, 2023, at the age of 69, after battling an illness for several months.

== Publications ==
- Bejui, Pascal; René Courant (1985), Les trolleybus français, Presses et éditions ferroviaires, p. 157, ISBN 978-2905447012
- Bejui, Pascal (1992), Les Chemins de Fer de la France d'Outre-mer. Volume 2. L'Afrique du Nord, le transsaharien, La Régordane
- Bejui, Pascal; Dominique Bejui (1994), Exploits et fantasmes transsahariens, La Régordane, p. 176, ISBN 9782906984196
- Bejui, Pascal (1991), Histoire du Rail: TransCévenol, La Régordane, ISBN 9782906984110
- Bejui, Pascal (January 1, 1985), Trains De Montagne, Presses et éditions Ferroviaires, p. 191, ISBN 2905447001
- Bejui, Pascal (2001), Les Chemins de Fer de la Corse, La Régordane, p. 175, ISBN 9782906984394
- Bejui, Pascal; Piotti, Vincent; Etievant, Christophe (2011), Le réseau du Vivarais au temps des CFD, La Régordane, ISBN 2906984914
- Bejui, Pascal (May 15, 2012), Crémaillères à la française, La Régordane, p. 176, ISBN 978-2906984950
- Bejui, Pascal (October 15, 2011), Vivarais, Velay: Les trains du renouveau, La Régordane, p. 208, ISBN 978-2906984943
- Bejui, Pascal; Giraud, Marc (2010), Paul Séjourné, génie des grands viaducs, La Régordane, p. 208, ISBN 9782906984899
