= Conrad Kilian =

French geologist (1898–1950)

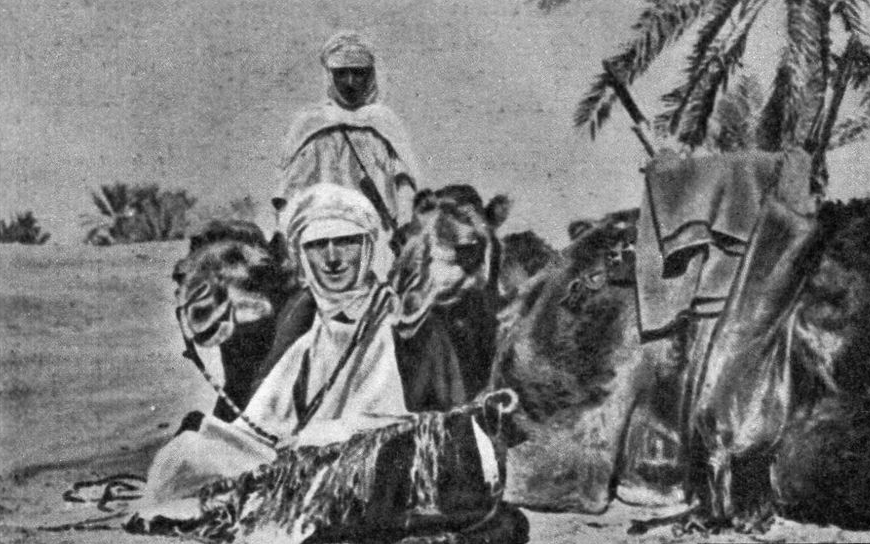
Kilian in the Sahara in Tuareg attire with his guide El-Bachir, c. 1940

François-Théodore-Conrad Kilian (23 August 1898 – 29 April 1950) was a French geologist, son of Charles Constant Wilfrid Kilian. An explorer of the Saharan region, he postulated that it held oil reserves underneath. He died under mysterious circumstances, in his hotel room in Grenoble in 1950.

== Life and work ==
Kilian was born in Château des Sauvages, Ardèche. His father Wilfrid, from Alsace, moved to Grenoble after 1870 and become a professor and a pioneer of alpine geology. His mother was Anna Boissy d'Anglas (1841-1899). An ancestor was George Cuvier, the paleontologist. He was educated at Grenoble before he entered the Naval academy at Louis-le-Grand like his brother Robert who became an Admiral but he did not complete due to poor health. He returned to Grenoble and in 1917 he enlisted in the army and served on the front, receiving a Croix de Guerre and demobilized in 1920. He joined studies in Lyon under Charles Deperet but gave up. He joined an expedition to Hoggar in 1921 after he heard about emeralds (turning out to be green felspar). He followed the route of the ill-fated Flatters mission but being alone, he got along with the Tuaregs. Based on the observations made during his travels, he came to the conclusion that the Sahara was once a part of the sea and suggested that it might hold oil sources beneath it. His father Wilfrid sent Jacques Bourcart who was on the Danish Ole Olufsen mission to examine the claims. In 1922 Bourcart confirmed the observations. He made numerous explorations in the Sahara desert in search of oil sources. In 1934, he helped produce a geological map of Africa and was involved in the International Exhibition of the Sahara in Paris. Silene kiliani was named after Kilian by René Maire.

== Death and legacy ==
Kilian's body was found hanging in a hotel room in Grenoble on 30 April, 1950 with slashes on his chest and wrist and a note hanging on the latch. Whether it was a suicide or murder was never confirmed. He had always believed that British intelligence was hunting for him. In 1943 his guide was killed but he recovered from a poisoning attempt in Tamanrasset, presumably for his role in preventing the mining and transport of wolfram ore into British Nigeria.

Several films have been made and books have been written based on the life of Kilian, including the French film Le fou du désert (madman of the desert) 1983, and the biographies Conrad Kilian : explorateur souverain (1983) by Eulogue Boissonnade and L'or noir du Sahara - La pathétique aventure de Conrad Kilian - Ceux de la Une (1958) by Yves Salgues.
