= Béchar =

Béchar ⴱⵛⵛⴰⵕ بشار
- City
- Béchar
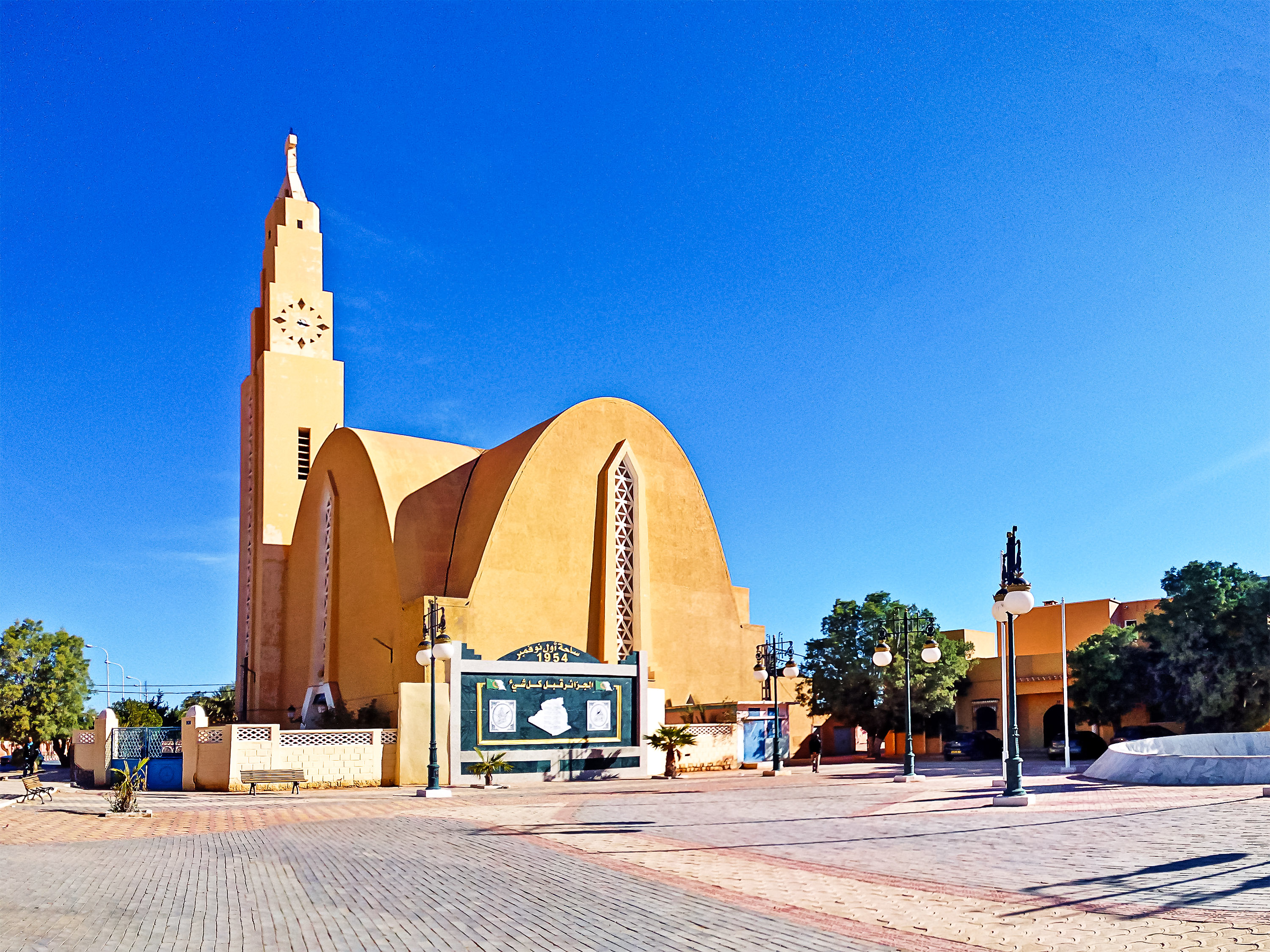
- 1st of November Square

- Location of Béchar commune within Béchar Province

- Location of Béchar within Algeria
- Coordinates: 31°37′N 2°13′W
- Country: Algeria
- Province: Béchar Province
- District: Béchar District

Government
  - PMA Seats: 23

Area
  - Total: 5,050 km^{2} (1,950 sq mi)
- Elevation: 747 m (2,451 ft)

Population (2008)
  - Total: 165,627
  - Density: 32.8/km^{2} (84.9/sq mi)
- Time zone: UTC+1 (CET)
- Postal code: 08000
- ONS code: 0801
- Climate: BWh

Béchar (Tamazight: ⴱⵛⵛⴰⵕ, romanized: Bchchaṛ, Arabic: بشار, romanized: Bashār) is the capital city of Béchar Province, Algeria. It is also a commune, coextensive with Béchar District, of Béchar Province. In 2008 the city had a population of 165,627, up from 134,954 in 1998, with an annual growth rate of 2.1%. The commune covers an area of 5,050 square kilometres (1,950 sq mi).

Béchar thrived on the activity of the coal mines until petroleum production seized the market.

Leatherwork and jewellery are notable products of Béchar. Dates, vegetables, figs, cereals and almonds are produced near Béchar. There are bituminous coal reserves near Béchar, but they are not exploited to their greatest potential because of transportation costs are too high relative to that from the oil and gas fields of eastern Algeria. The city was once the site of a French Foreign Legion post.

The Kenadsa longwave transmitter, whose masts are the tallest structures in Algeria at 357 metres (1,171 ft), is found near Béchar.

== Geography ==
Béchar is located in the northwestern region of Algeria roughly 58 kilometres (36 mi) south of the Moroccan border.

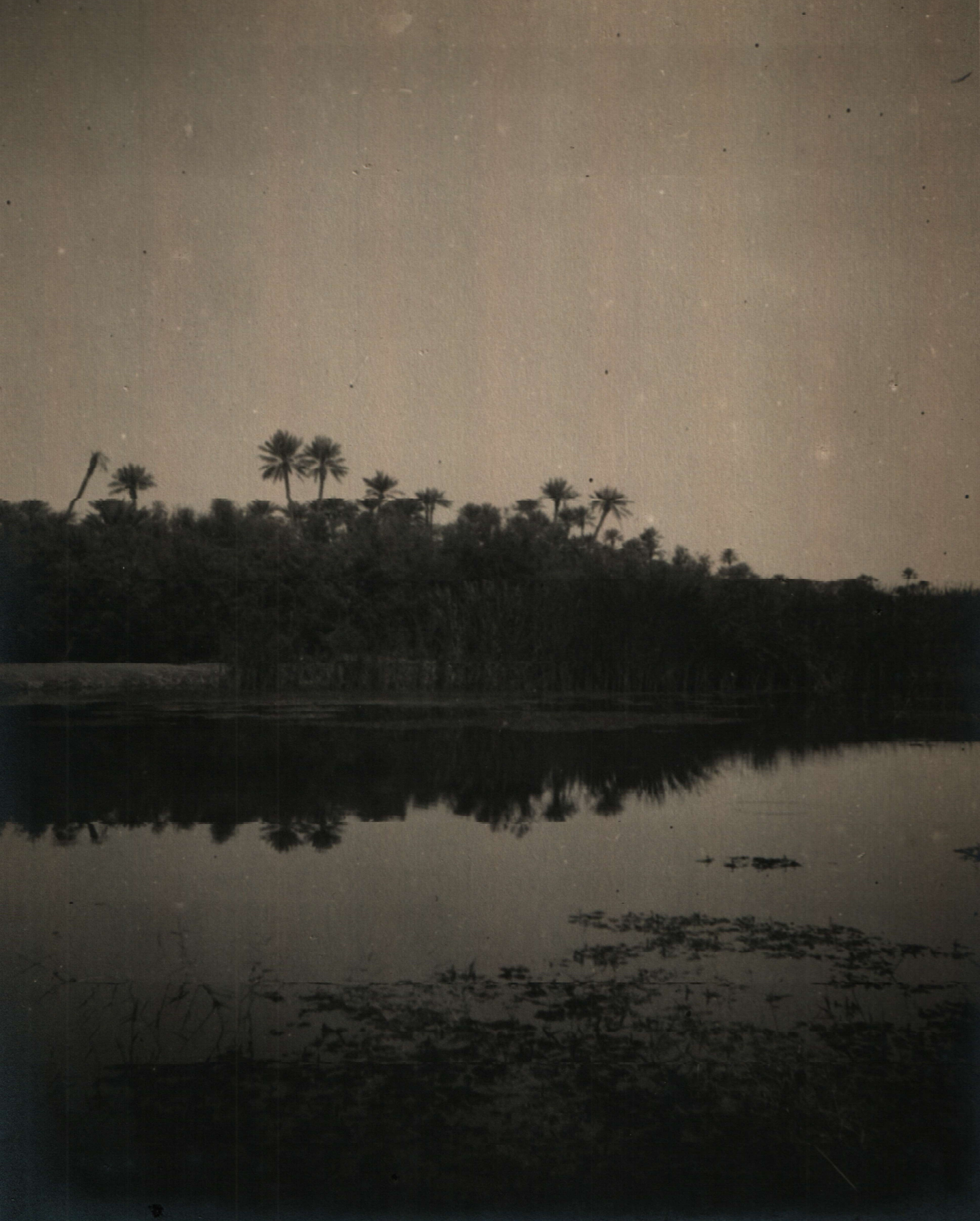
Shore of Oued Béchar in January 1913.

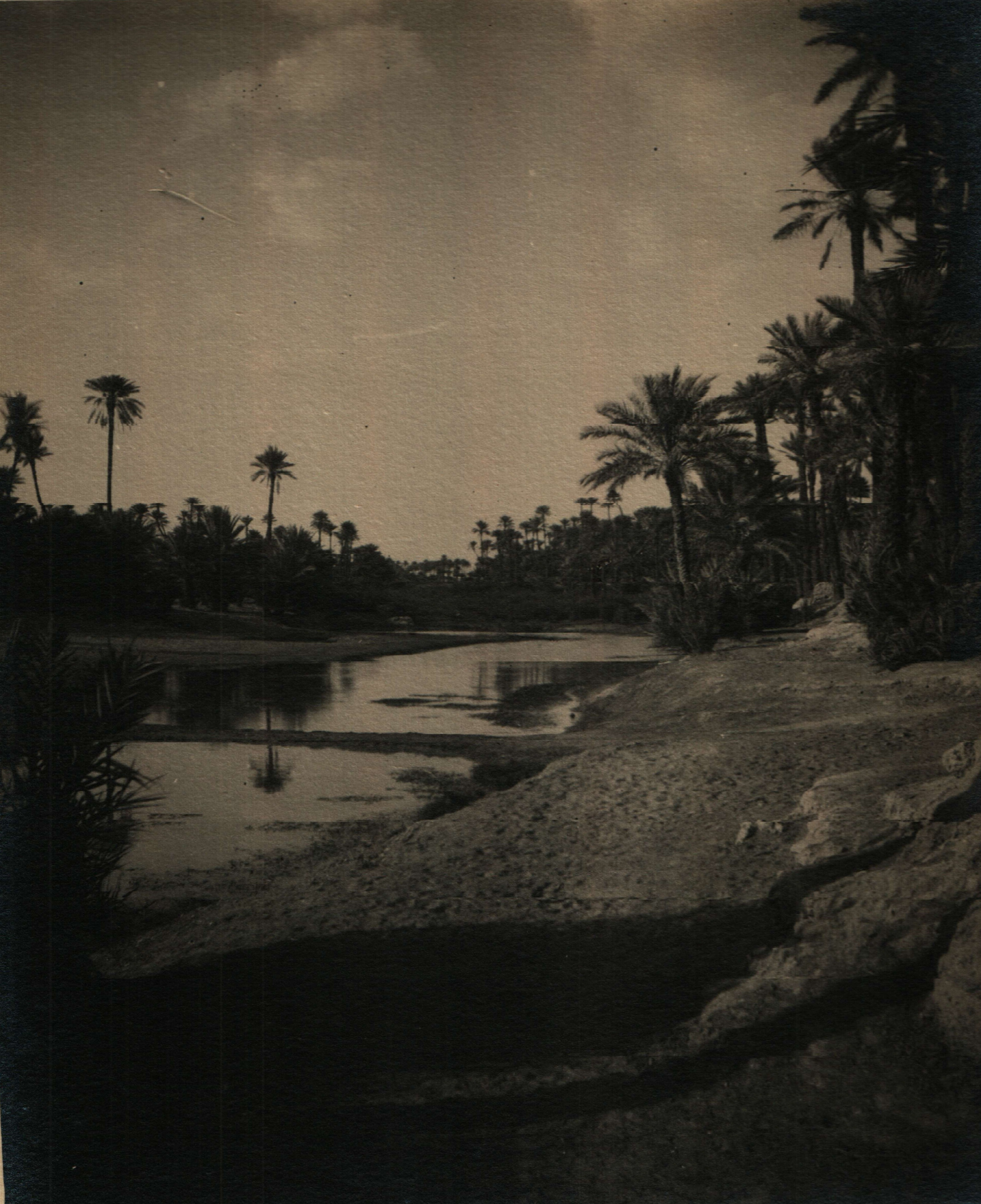
Shore of Oued Béchar in January 1913.

Béchar lies at an elevation of 747 metres (2,451 ft) on the banks of Oued Béchar, which runs through the city from northeast to southwest. The rocky highlands of the Djebel Béchar overlook the city from the southeast, reaching 1,206 metres (3,957 ft) to the east of the city. Further to the northeast the Djebel Antar range rises even higher, to 1,953 metres (6,407 ft). The northwest, by contrast, is a flat rocky reg.

=== Climate ===
Béchar has a hot desert climate (Köppen climate classification BWh), with extremely hot summers and warm winters despite the high elevation. There is very little rain throughout the year, and summers are especially dry.

Climate data for Béchar (1991–2020, extremes 1906–present)
Month	Jan	Feb	Mar	Apr	May	Jun	Jul	Aug	Sep	Oct	Nov	Dec	Year
Record high °C (°F)	27.2 (81.0)	31.2 (88.2)	38.0 (100.4)	37.5 (99.5)	41.2 (106.2)	43.4 (110.1)	45.8 (114.4)	47.8 (118.0)	43.5 (110.3)	37.7 (99.9)	30.5 (86.9)	27.8 (82.0)	47.8 (118.0)
Mean daily maximum °C (°F)	16.6 (61.9)	18.8 (65.8)	22.8 (73.0)	27.0 (80.6)	31.7 (89.1)	36.9 (98.4)	40.9 (105.6)	39.6 (103.3)	34.4 (93.9)	28.2 (82.8)	21.3 (70.3)	17.2 (63.0)	28.0 (82.4)
Daily mean °C (°F)	9.9 (49.8)	12.2 (54.0)	16.4 (61.5)	20.7 (69.3)	25.4 (77.7)	30.3 (86.5)	34.3 (93.7)	33.3 (91.9)	28.3 (82.9)	22.1 (71.8)	15.2 (59.4)	10.9 (51.6)	21.6 (70.9)
Mean daily minimum °C (°F)	3.3 (37.9)	5.7 (42.3)	10.0 (50.0)	14.4 (57.9)	19.0 (66.2)	23.7 (74.7)	27.7 (81.9)	26.9 (80.4)	22.1 (71.8)	16.0 (60.8)	9.1 (48.4)	4.7 (40.5)	15.2 (59.4)
Record low °C (°F)	−4.8 (23.4)	−4.2 (24.4)	0.1 (32.2)	4.0 (39.2)	7.7 (45.9)	10.1 (50.2)	17.8 (64.0)	17.0 (62.6)	12.0 (53.6)	5.8 (42.4)	−0.2 (31.6)	−3.9 (25.0)	−4.8 (23.4)
Average precipitation mm (inches)	5.8 (0.23)	7.2 (0.28)	10.8 (0.43)	6.0 (0.24)	6.1 (0.24)	4.4 (0.17)	2.0 (0.08)	4.8 (0.19)	12.2 (0.48)	16.1 (0.63)	18.7 (0.74)	7.9 (0.31)	102 (4.02)
Average precipitation days (≥ 1 mm)	1.3	1.3	1.6	1.1	1.1	0.8	0.6	1.3	2.0	2.0	1.7	1.2	16.0
Average relative humidity (%)	43	34	28	25	21	19	15	17	24	31	40	45	29
Mean monthly sunshine hours	261.8	253.5	290.9	309.9	342.7	348	361	310.7	274.1	274.5	256.1	251.8	3,535
Source 1: NOAA
Source 2: Danish Meteorological Institute (sun june, july and humidity 1931–1960) Meteo Climat (record highs and lows)

== Economy ==
Agriculture is an important industry in Béchar. The commune has a total of 8,384 hectares (20,720 acres) of arable land, of which 5,100 hectares (13,000 acres) is irrigated. There are a total of 109,000 date palms planted in the commune, occupying 910 hectares (2,200 acres). Other crops include vegetables, figs, cereals and almonds. As of 2009 there were 19,067 sheep, 16,664 goats, 1,766 camels, and 444 cattle. There were also 126,000 chickens in 20 buildings.

There is some tourism in the city, with 10 hotels and tourist attractions including sand dunes, palm groves, the old ksar, and an ancient fort.

Other industries in the city include coal mining, and the production of leatherwork and jewellery.

== Infrastructure and housing ==
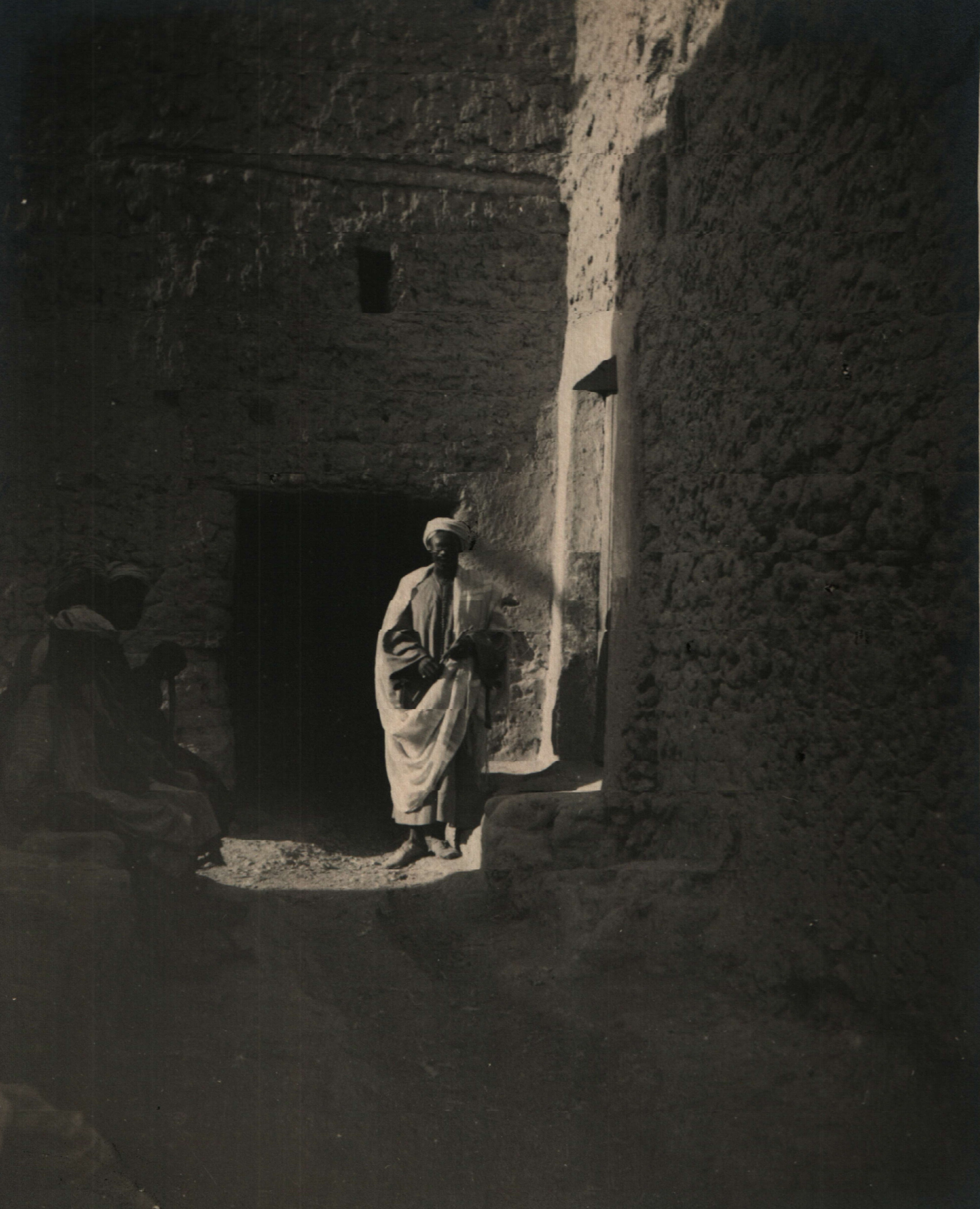
Béchar in January 1913.

98% of Béchar's population is connected to drinking water, 95% is connected to the sewerage system, and 99% (including 33,180 houses) have access to electricity. There are 6 fuel service stations in the town.

Béchar has a total of 33,245 houses, of which 25,499 are occupied, giving an occupation rate of 6.5 inhabitants per occupied building.

== Transportation ==
The main road through Béchar is the N6 highway; it connects to Mecheria, Saida, Mascara and Oran to the north, and to Adrar and Timiaouine to the south. There is a total length of 207.5 kilometres (128.9 mi) of roads in the commune.

It is served by SNTF by a standard gauge railway converted in 2010 from narrow gauge (1,055mm). From 1941 to 1963 it was reached by the standard gauge Mediterranean-Niger-Railway.

Béchar is served by Boudghene Ben Ali Lotfi Airport, 4 kilometres (2.5 mi) to the northwest of the city.

== Education ==
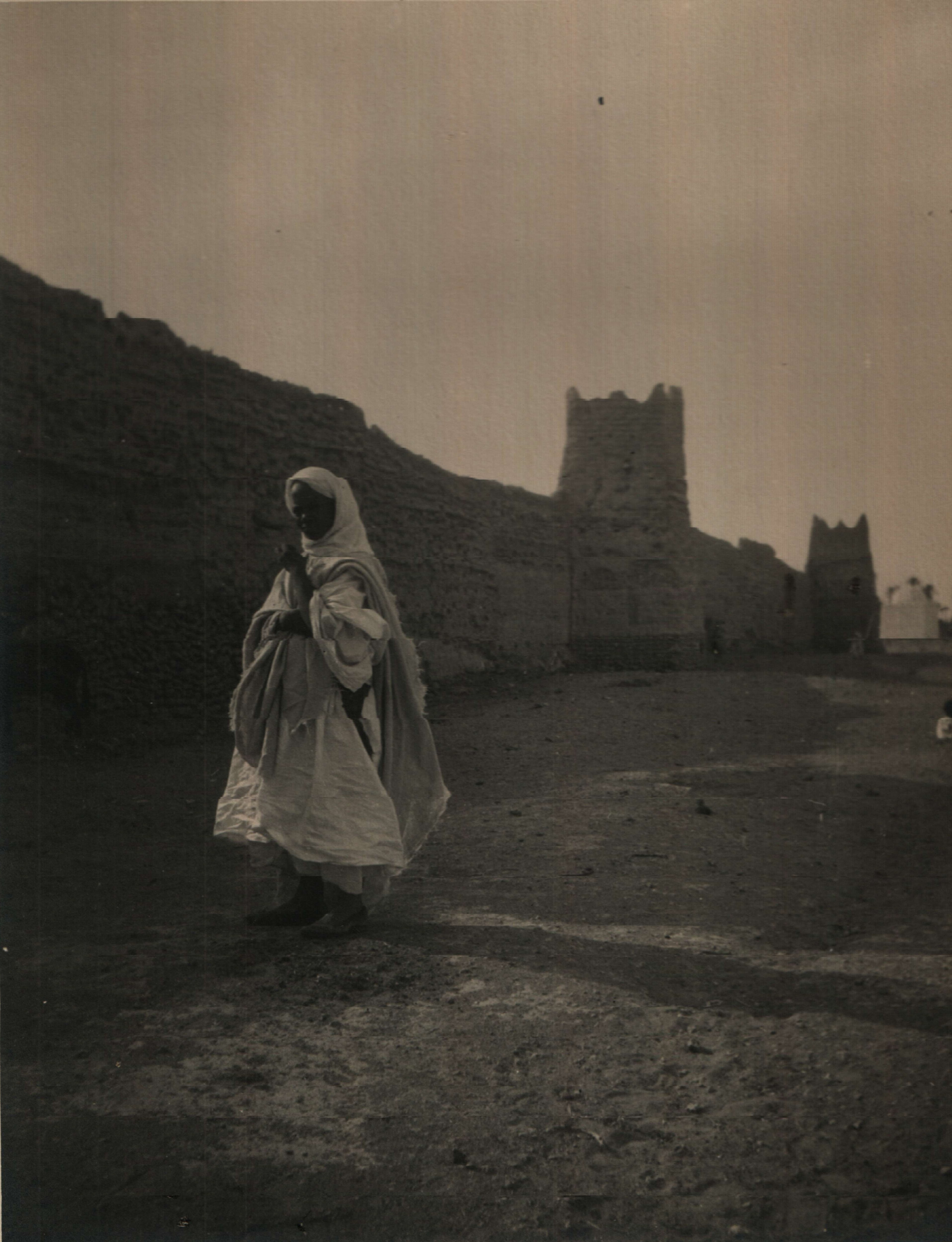
Béchar in January 1913.

The city is home to the University of Béchar.

There are 68 elementary schools in Béchar, with 777 classrooms including 581 in use. There are a total of 33,511 school students.

8.3% of the population has a tertiary education, and another 23.0% has competed secondary education. The overall literacy rate is 86.4%, and is 91.4% among males and 81.4% among females.

== Health ==
Béchar has 2 hospitals, 4 polyclinics, 17-room care facilities, a maternity ward, 36 private pharmacies, 5 medical operating theatres, and a psychiatric service.

== Culture ==
Béchar has a cinema with 850 seats, as well as a museum.

== Religion ==
Béchar has 27 operational mosques, with another 19 under construction.

== Historical population ==
Year	Population
1936	5,100
1954	43,300
1966	46,500
1977	56,600 (town); 72,800 (municipality)
1987	107,300
1998	134,500
2008	165,627

== Localities ==
The commune is composed of 8 localities:

- Béchar Centre
- Debdaba
- Béchar Djedid
- Ouakda
- Benzireg
- Hassi Haouari
- Zouzfana
- Gharassa
- Manouarar Nekheila

Béchar Djedid is located 5 kilometres (3 mi) south of the city and was constructed as housing for coal miners working in Kénadsa.

== See also ==
- Railway stations in Algeria
