= Mouzaïa District =

Coordinates: 36°28′N 2°41′E

Mouzaïa District دائرة موزاية
- District
- Map of Algeria highlighting Blida Province
- Country: Algeria
- Province: Blida
- District seat: Mouzaïa

Population (1998)
  - Total: 81,263
- Time zone: UTC+01 (CET)
- Municipalities: 3

Mouzaïa is a district in Blida Province, Algeria. It was named after its capital, Mouzaïa.

== Municipalities ==
The district is further divided into 3 municipalities:

- Mouzaïa
- Aïn Romana
- Chiffa
