= Oued El Alleug District =

Coordinates: 36°33′N 2°47′E

Oued El Alleug District دائرة وادي العلايق
- District
- Map of Algeria highlighting Blida Province
- Country: Algeria
- Province: Blida
- District seat: Oued El Alleug

Population (1998)
  - Total: 79,073
- Time zone: UTC+01 (CET)
- Municipalities: 3

Oued El Alleug is a district in Blida Province, Algeria. It was named after its capital, Oued El Alleug.

== Municipalities ==
The district is further divided into 3 municipalities:

- Oued El Alleug
- Béni Tamou
- Ben Khéllil
