= Souakria =

- Motto: السواكرية
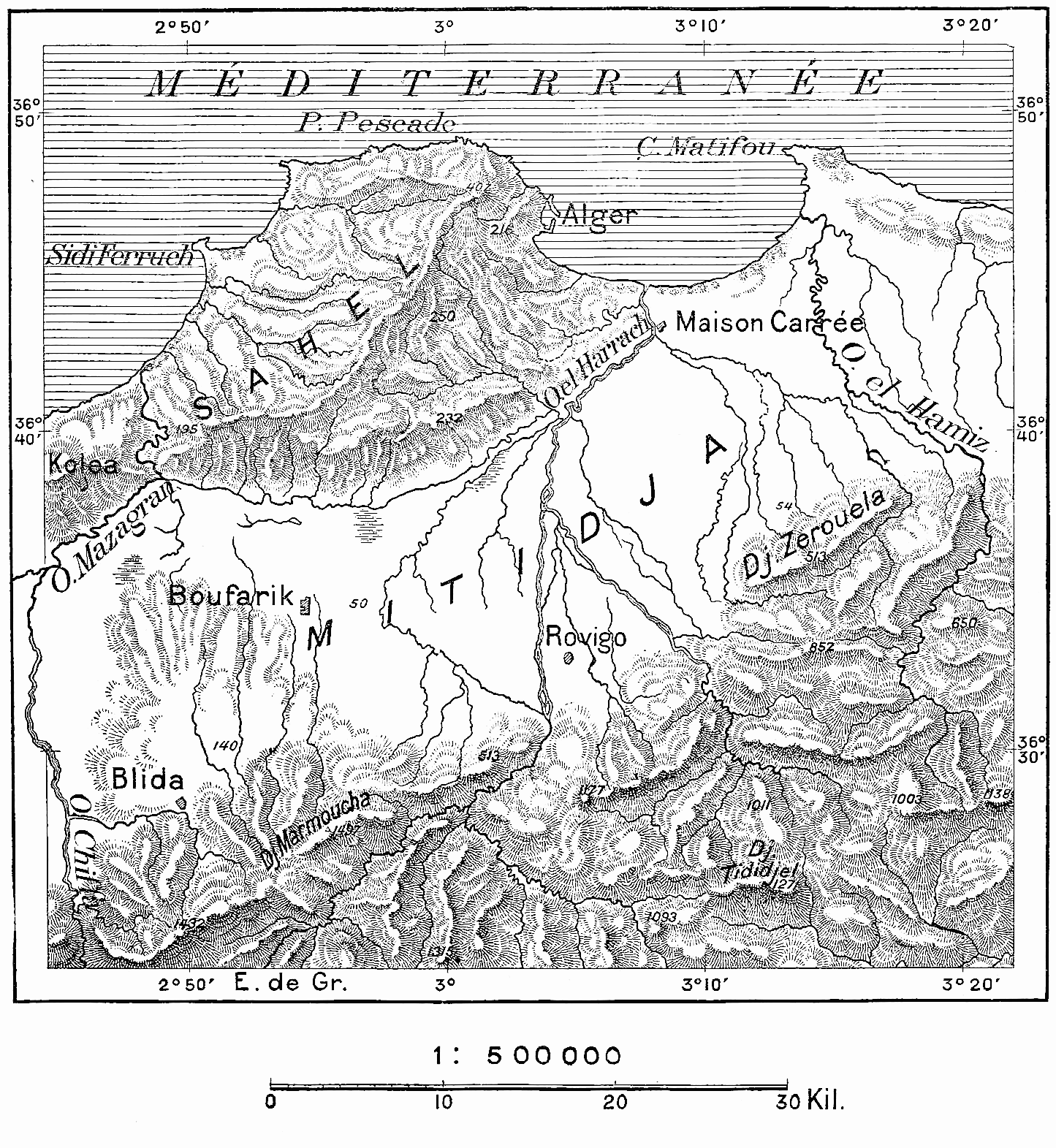
- Coordinates: 36.6508141°N 3.1989839°E
- Commune: Meftah
- District: Meftah District
- Province: Blida Province
- Region: Mitidja
- Country: Algeria

Area
  - Total: 5 km^{2} (1.9 sq mi)

Dimensions
  - Length: 2.5 km (1.6 mi)
  - Width: 2 km (1.2 mi)
- Elevation: 230 m (750 ft)
- Time zone: UTC+01:00
- Area code: 09012

Souakria is a village in Blida Province in Mitidja, Algeria.

== Location ==
The village is surrounded by El Harrach River and also the town of Blida.

== Notable people ==
- Yahia Boushaki (Shahid) (1935-1960), Algerian revolutionary.
