= El Affroun District =

Coordinates: 36°28′N 2°38′E

El Affroun District دائرة الأربعاء
- District
- Map of Algeria highlighting Blida Province
- Country: Algeria
- Province: Blida
- District seat: El Affroun

Population (1998)
  - Total: 42,975
- Time zone: UTC+01 (CET)
- Municipalities: 2

El Affroun is a district in Blida Province, Algeria. It was named after its capital, El Affroun.

== Municipalities ==
The district is further divided into 2 municipalities:

- El Affroun
- Oued Djer
