= Bougara District =

Coordinates: 36°32′N 3°05′E

Bougara District دائرة بوقرة
- District
- Map of Algeria highlighting Blida Province
- Country: Algeria
- Province: Blida
- District seat: Bougara (Blida Province)

Population (1998)
  - Total: 63,253
- Time zone: UTC+01 (CET)
- Municipalities: 3

Bougara is a district in Blida Province, Algeria. It was named after its capital, Bougara.

== Municipalities ==
The district is further divided into 3 municipalities:

- Bougara
- Hammam Melouane
- Ouled Selama
