= Boufarik District =

Coordinates: 36°34′14″N 2°54′39″E

Boufarik District دائرة بوفاريك
- District
- Map of Algeria highlighting Blida Province
- Country: Algeria
- Province: Blida
- District seat: Boufarik

Population (1998)
  - Total: 103,684
- Time zone: UTC+01 (CET)
- Municipalities: 3

Boufarik is a district in Blida Province, Algeria. It was named after its capital, Boufarik.

== Municipalities ==
The district is further divided into 3 municipalities:

- Boufarik
- Soumaâ
- Guerrouaou
