= Meftah District =

Coordinates: 36°37′N 3°14′E

Meftah District دائرة مفتاح
- District
- Map of Algeria highlighting Blida Province
- Country: Algeria
- Province: Blida
- District seat: Meftah

Population (1998)
  - Total: 54,965
- Time zone: UTC+01 (CET)
- Municipalities: 2

Meftah is a district in Blida Province, Algeria. It was named after its capital, Meftah.

== Municipalities ==
The district is further divided into 2 municipalities:

- Meftah
- Djebabra

== Notable people ==
- Yahia Boushaki (Shahid) (1935-1960), Algerian leader and martyr.
