= Bouinan District =

Coordinates: 36°31′45″N 2°59′37″E

Bouinan District دائرة بوينان
- District
- Map of Algeria highlighting Blida Province
- Country: Algeria
- Province: Blida
- District seat: Bouinan

Population (1998)
  - Total: 46,377
- Time zone: UTC+01 (CET)
- Municipalities: 2

Bouinan is a district in Blida Province, Algeria. It was named after its capital, Bouinan.

== Municipalities ==
The district is further divided into 2 municipalities:

- Bouinan
- Chébli
