= Bouarfa =

Bouarfa may refer to:

- Bouarfa, Algeria
- Bouarfa, Morocco
  - Bouarfa Airport
