= Blida District =

Coordinates: 36°28′N 2°49′E

Blida District دائرة البليدة
- District
- Map of Algeria highlighting Blida Province
- Country: Algeria
- Province: Blida
- District seat: Blida

Population (1998)
  - Total: 174,483
- Time zone: UTC+01 (CET)
- Municipalities: 2

Blida is a district in Blida Province, Algeria. It was named after its capital, Blida, which is also the capital of the province. It is the most populous district in the province.

== Municipalities ==
The district is further divided into 2 municipalities, Blida and Bouarfa.

== Notable people ==
- Mhamed Yazid (1923-2003), politician
- Mahfoud Nahnah (1942-2003), politician
- Mohamed Baba Ameur (1893-1976), theologian
- Mohamed Bouslimani (1941-1993), politician
