= Chréa =

Chrea الشريعة
- Commune and town
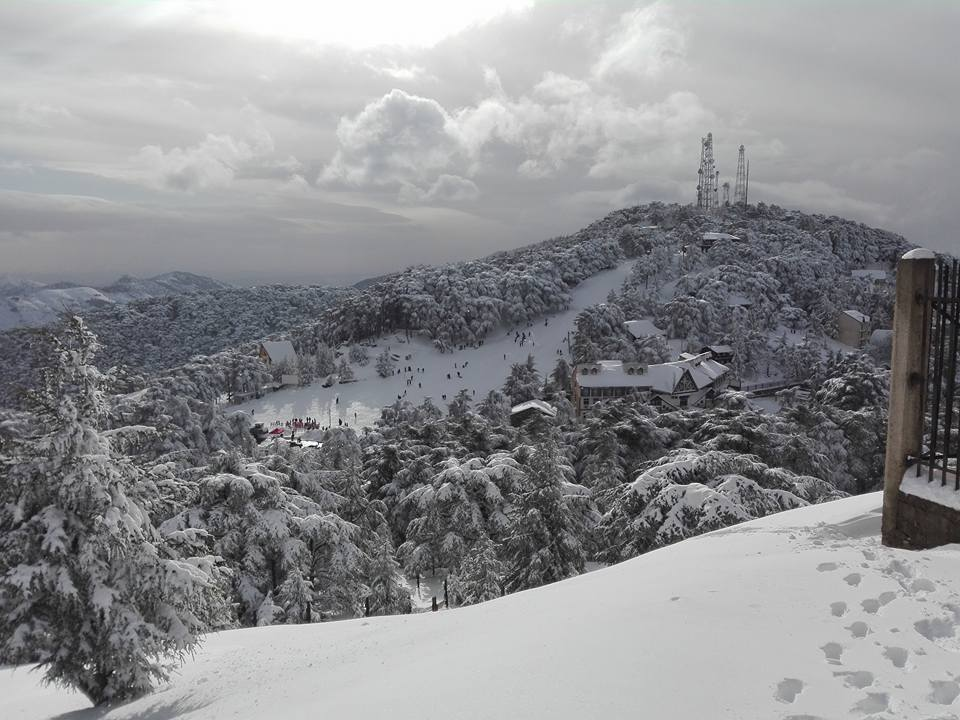

- Map of Blida province highlighting the Chréa commune

- Location within Algeria
- Coordinates: 36°25′37″N 2°52′35″E
- Country: Algeria
- Province: Blida Province

Population (2008)
  - Total: 783
- Time zone: UTC+1 (CET)

Chrea is a town in Algeria, located in Blida Province, Ouled Yaïch District, in a mountainous area named Tell Atlas, near Blida. It had a population of 783 in 2008.

In its municipality is situated the Chréa National Park, one of the largest national parks of the country, and a ski resort.

Within the national park is one of the few relict populations of the endangered primate, the Barbary macaque, Macaca sylvanus; this species of primate originally had a much wider range in Northern Algeria and Morocco.

== Geography ==
=== Climate ===
Located in the Atlas Mountains, at 1,458 metres (4,783 ft) above sea level, Chréa has a cool Mediterranean climate, with an average annual precipitation of 916 millimetres (36.1 in). Summers are warm and dry and winters are chilly and wetter, with snowfalls. This climate is described by the Köppen climate classification as Csb. This is one of the coldest places in Algeria.

Climate data for Chréa
Month	Jan	Feb	Mar	Apr	May	Jun	Jul	Aug	Sep	Oct	Nov	Dec	Year
Mean daily maximum °C (°F)	6.7 (44.1)	7.9 (46.2)	9.9 (49.8)	12.8 (55.0)	17.4 (63.3)	22.7 (72.9)	28.5 (83.3)	28.5 (83.3)	23.2 (73.8)	17.0 (62.6)	10.8 (51.4)	7.5 (45.5)	16.1 (60.9)
Mean daily minimum °C (°F)	−0.9 (30.4)	−0.4 (31.3)	1.1 (34.0)	3.2 (37.8)	6.9 (44.4)	11.2 (52.2)	15.7 (60.3)	15.9 (60.6)	12.3 (54.1)	7.7 (45.9)	2.7 (36.9)	0.3 (32.5)	6.3 (43.4)
Average precipitation mm (inches)	133 (5.2)	92 (3.6)	105 (4.1)	79 (3.1)	70 (2.8)	30 (1.2)	6 (0.2)	10 (0.4)	39 (1.5)	76 (3.0)	136 (5.4)	140 (5.5)	916 (36)
Source: Climate-data.org
