= Bougara =

Coordinates: 36°32′N 3°05′E

Bougara بوقرہ
- Commune and town
- Interactive map of Bougara
- Country: Algeria
- Province: Blida Province

Population (2008)
  - Total: 38,352
- Time zone: UTC+1 (CET)

Bougara is a town in the Mitidja plain in Algeria, about 20 kilometers due south of Algiers. Located on the N29, the main road between Blida and Larbaâ, it is the capital of Bougara District, in Blida Province. In 1998 it had a population of 34,100.

Previously, under French rule, it was called Rovigo; it can be found with this name on this excerpt from the 1962 Michelin map of Algeria. The French name was chosen to honour the Duc de Rovigo who was commander-in-chief of the French army in Algeria from December 1831 to April 1833, when he was recalled due to the overtly violent nature of his repressive regime. Post cards of the town under French rule can be seen here.

There are the saline thermal springs at Hammam-Mélouane, eight kilometers south-west of the town. An old postcard showing the baths complex can be seen here.

British Army troops were billeted on French-owned farms outside Bougara in the autumn of 1943. In 1946, the Haganah, the pre-state Zionist military, had a training camp near Bougara.

On June 4, 1957 Someone, president of the délégation spéciale or mayor of Bougara, was arrested in the town by the DST for collusion with the FLN.

Famous people who were born in Bougara include two liberal pied noir writers, Jules Roy (born there in 1907) and Jean Pélégri (born there in 1920). The grave of Roy's mother is at the village of Sidi Moussa, about eight kilometres north of Bougara, which is where Roy was reared, on his maternal grandparents' farm.
