= Ouled Yaïch District =

Coordinates: 36°29′46″N 2°51′40″E

Ouled Yaïch District دائرة أولاد يعيش
- District
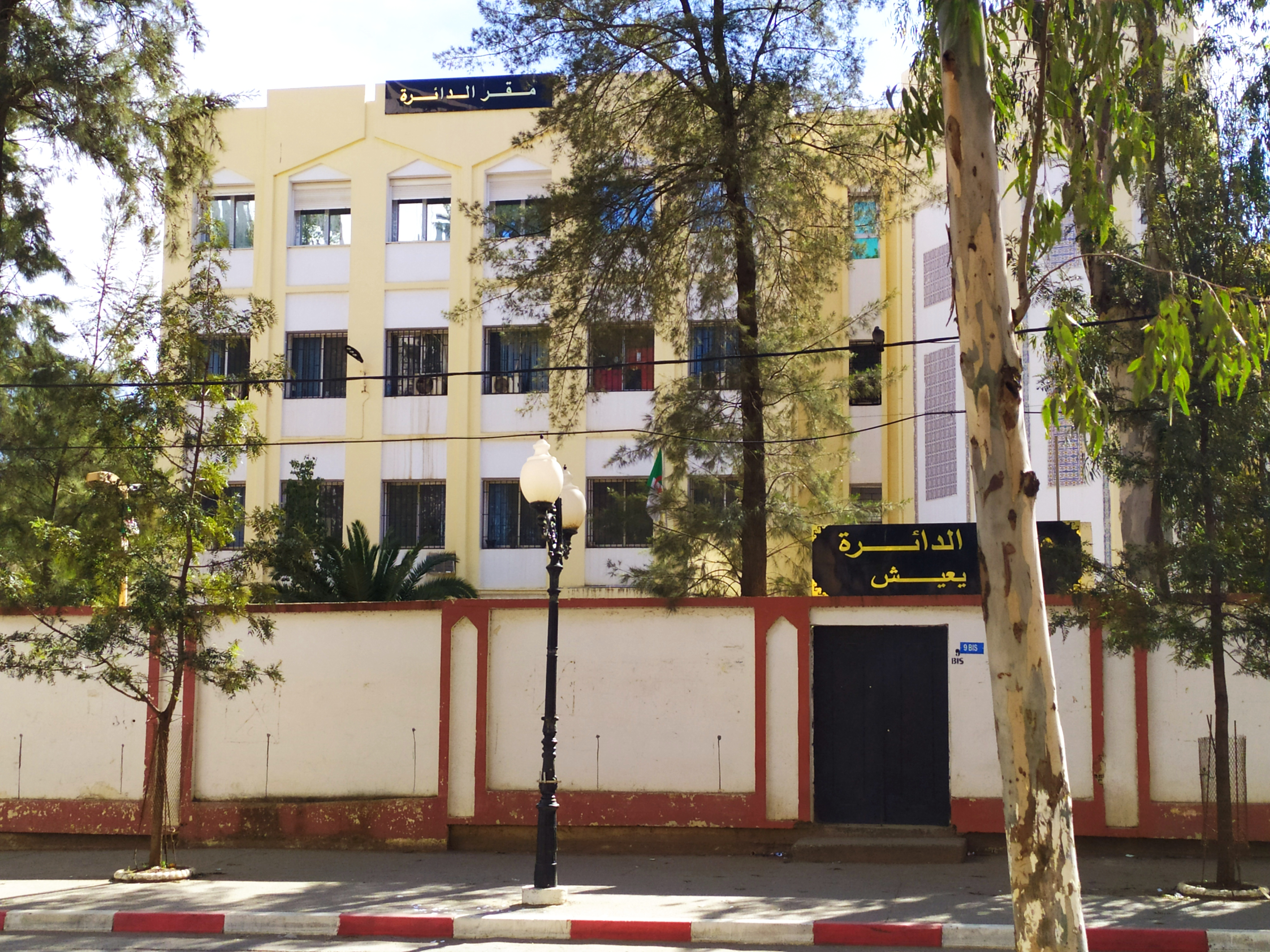
- Ouled Yaich District Office

- Map of Algeria highlighting Blida Province

- Map of Blida Province highlighting Ouled Yaïch District
- Country: Algeria
- Province: Blida
- District seat: Ouled Yaïch (Blida Province)

Population (1998)
  - Total: 77,630
- Time zone: UTC+01 (CET)
- Municipalities: 3

Ouled Yaïch is a district in Blida Province, Algeria. It was named after its capital, Ouled Yaïch.

== Municipalities ==
The district is further divided into 3 municipalities, one of them, Chréa, is the second least populous one in the country, and home to Chréa National Park:

- Ouled Yaïch
- Béni Mered
- Chréa
