= Chréa National Park =

National park in Algeria

- IUCN category II (national park)
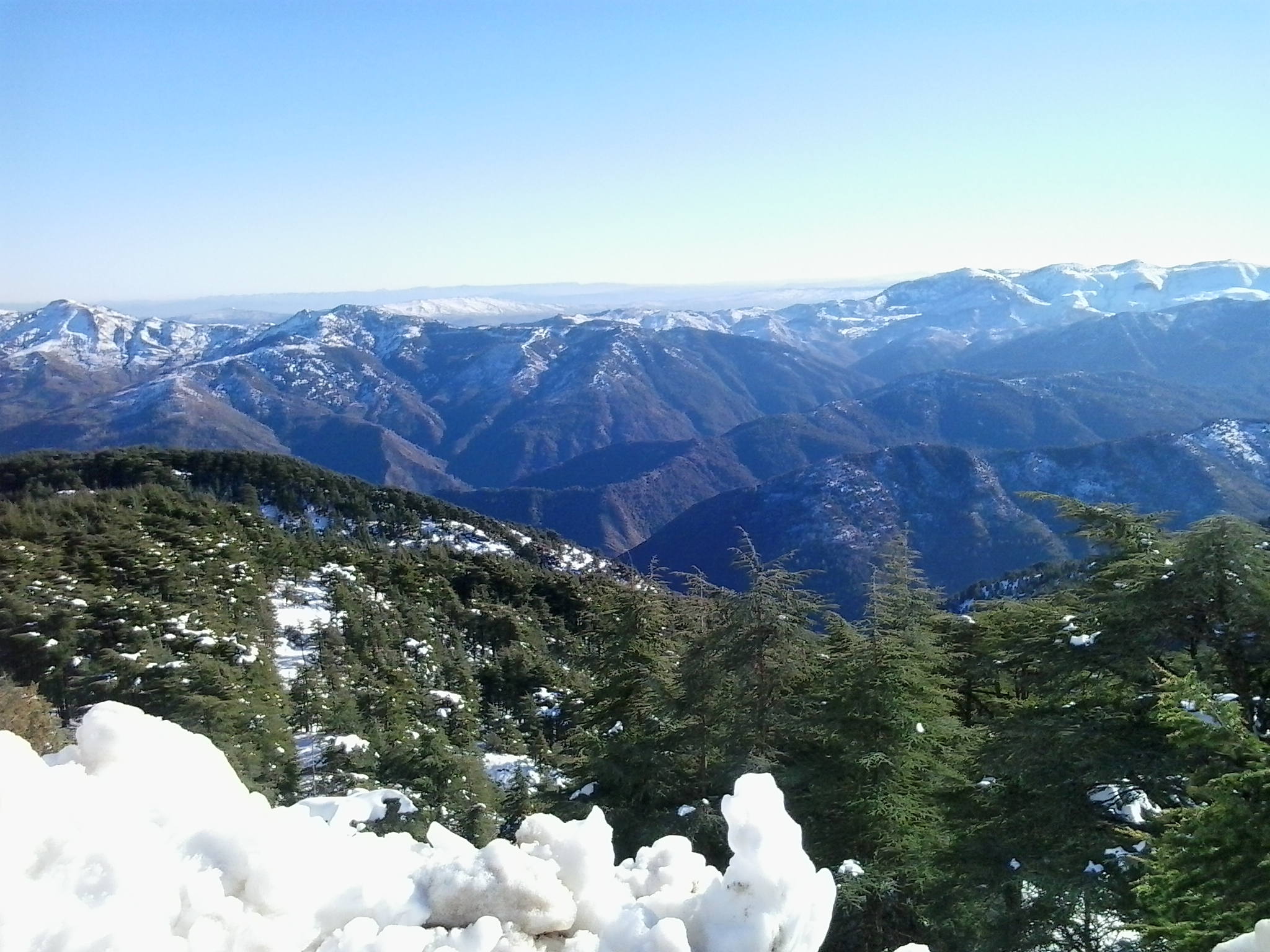

- Location within Algeria
- Interactive map of Chréa National Park
- Location: Blida Province, Algeria
- Nearest city: Chréa
- Coordinates: 36°24′N 2°52′E
- Area: 260 km^{2} (100 sq mi)
- Established: 1985

The Chréa National Park (Arabic:الحديقة الوطنية الشريعة) is one of the largest national parks of Algeria. It is located in Blida Province, named after Chréa, a town near this park. The park, located in a mountainous area known as the Blidean Atlas (which is part of the Tell Atlas) includes the ski station of Chréa, one of the few ski stations in Africa where skiing can be done on natural snow, and the grotto of Chiffa.

Founded in 1997, it covers an area of 36,985 hectares.

The national park is home to over 1240 plant and animal species, such as the Atlas cedar (Cedrus atlantica) and the Barbary macaque (Macaca sylvanus).

== Natural features ==
The Chréa National Park is home to a varied flora and fauna. Its ancient Atlas cedar forests is habitat for a population of the endangered Barbary macaque. This national park has one of the few such habitat areas in Algeria that support a sub-population of the Barbary macaque.

== Animals in Chréa National Park ==
- Barbary macaque
- Wild boar
- Striped hyena
- Red fox
- Golden jackal
- North African hedgehog
- Common genet
- Egyptian mongoose
- European badger
- Least weasel
- African wildcat
- Crested porcupine
- Barbary stag
