= Ben Khéllil =

Coordinates: 36°37′13″N 2°52′35″E

Ben Khéllil بن خليل (Arabic)
- Commune and town
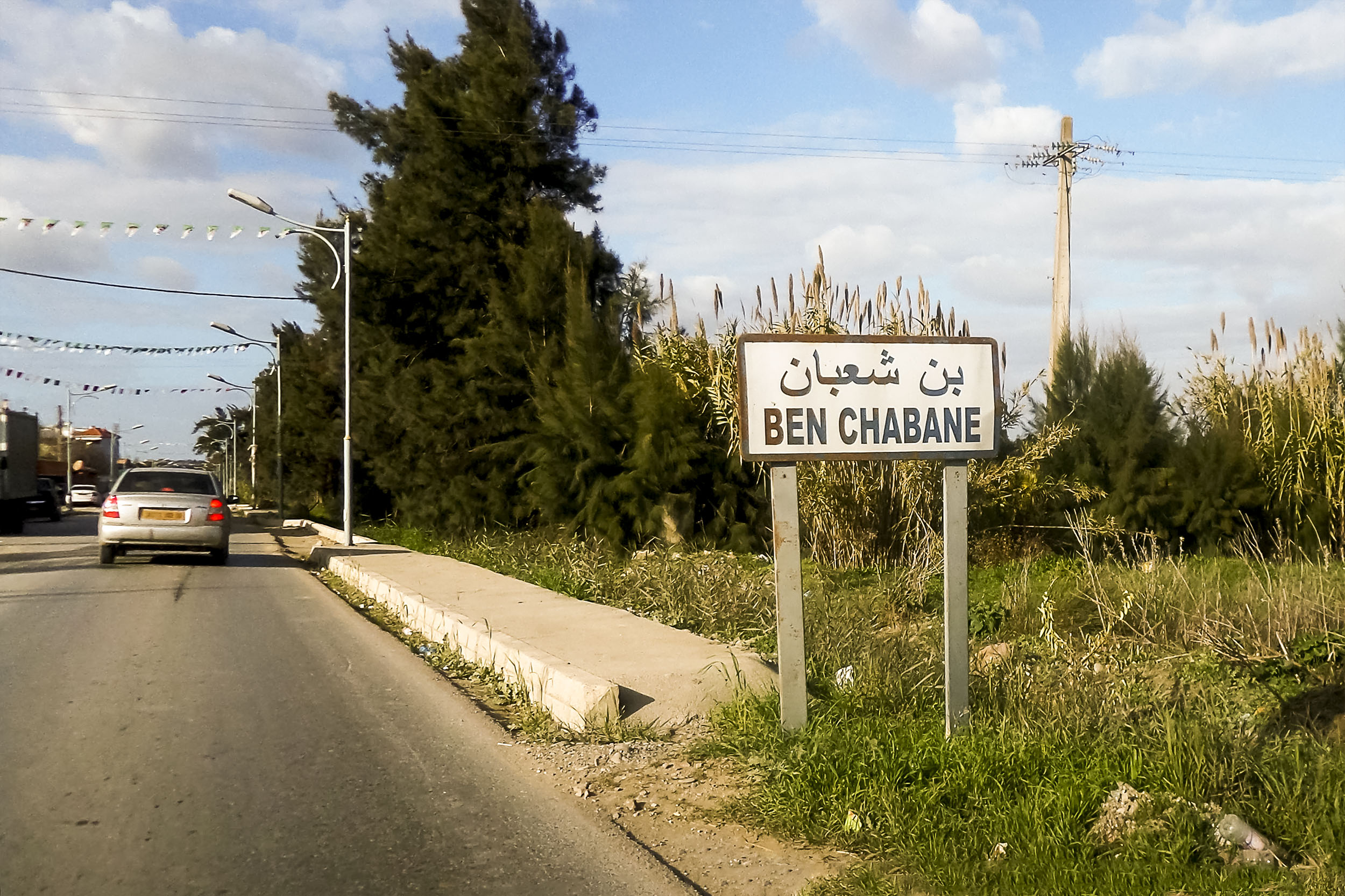
- Village of Benchabane in Ben Khéllil

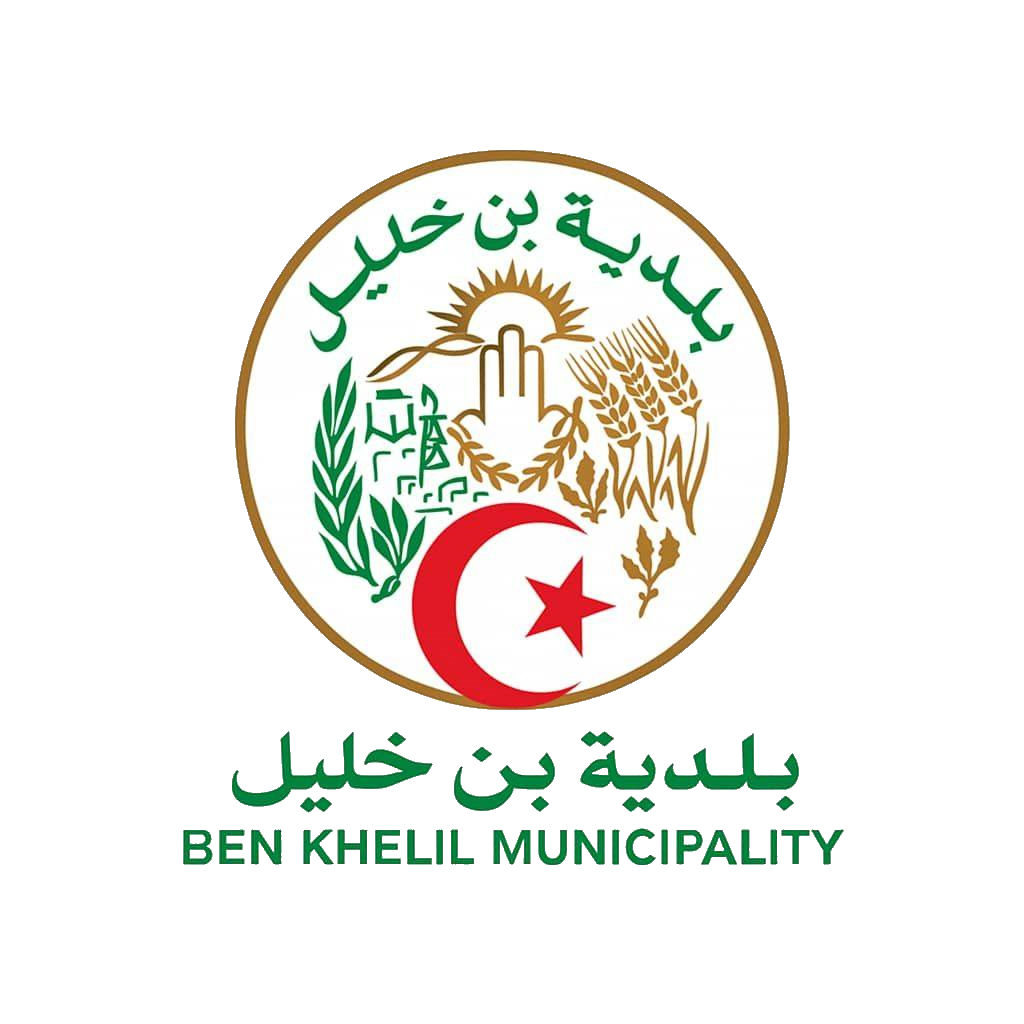
- Seal

- Location of the commune in the wilaya of Blida
- Country: Algeria
- Province: Blida Province

Population (2008)
  - Total: 29,404
- Time zone: UTC+1 (CET)
- Postal code: 09025

Ben Khéllil (Arabic: بن خليل, Berber: Ben Xlil, Tifinagh: ⴱⴻⵏ ⵅⵍⵉⵍ) is a town and commune in Blida Province, Algeria.

== Geography ==
=== Localisation ===
The commune of Benkhelil is located in the north of the wilaya of Blida, approximately 20 km northeast of Blida and approximately 34 km southwest of Algiers and approximately 46 km northeast of Médéa

=== Localities of the municipality ===
During the administrative division of 1984, the commune of Benkhelil was made up of the following localities:

- Ben Khelill
- Ben Chabane
- Ben Hamdani
- Boukandoura
- Oued El Mallah
