= Boufarik =

Boufarik بوفاريك ⴱⵓ ⴼⴰⵔⵉⴽ
- Commune and town
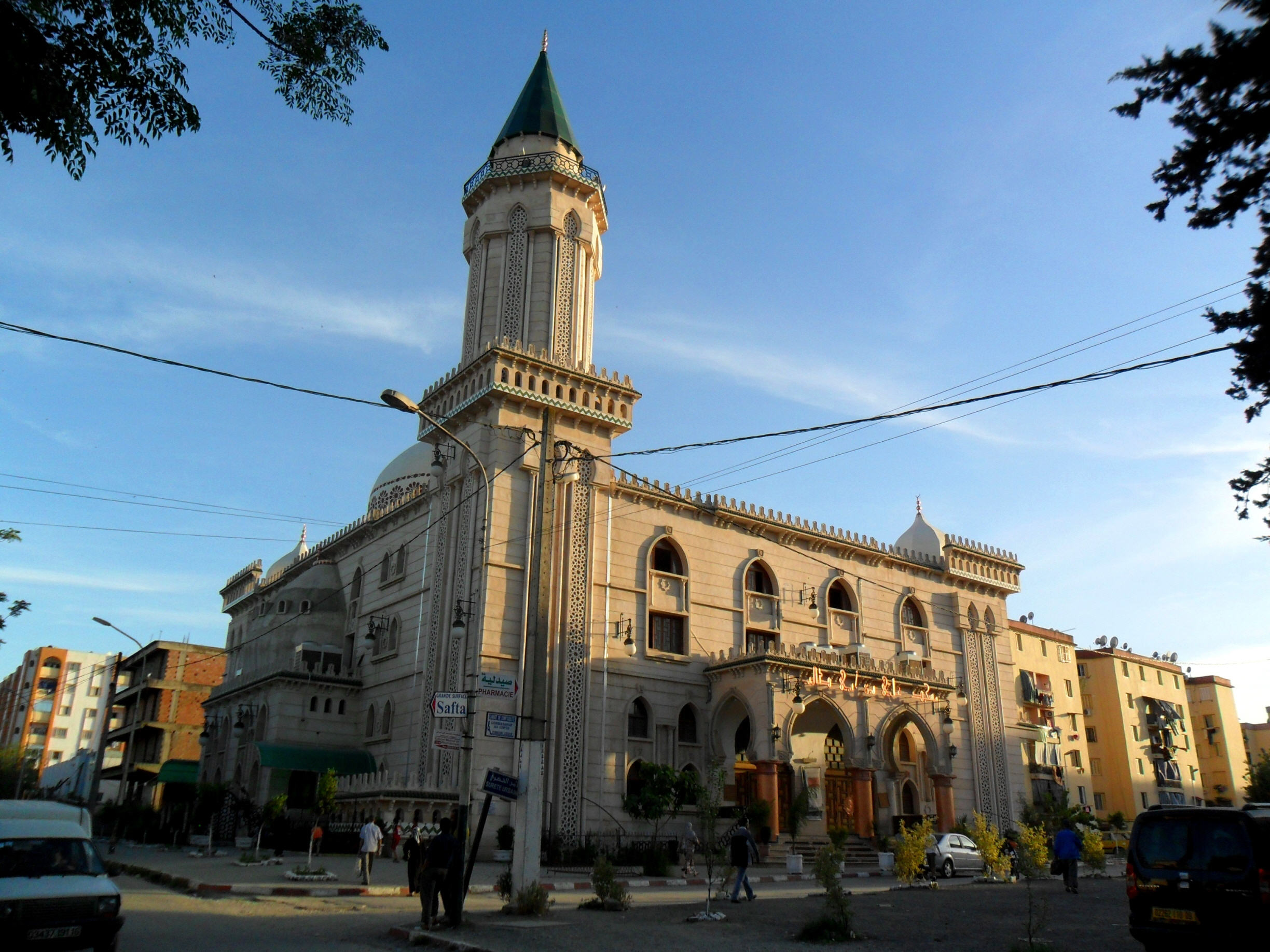
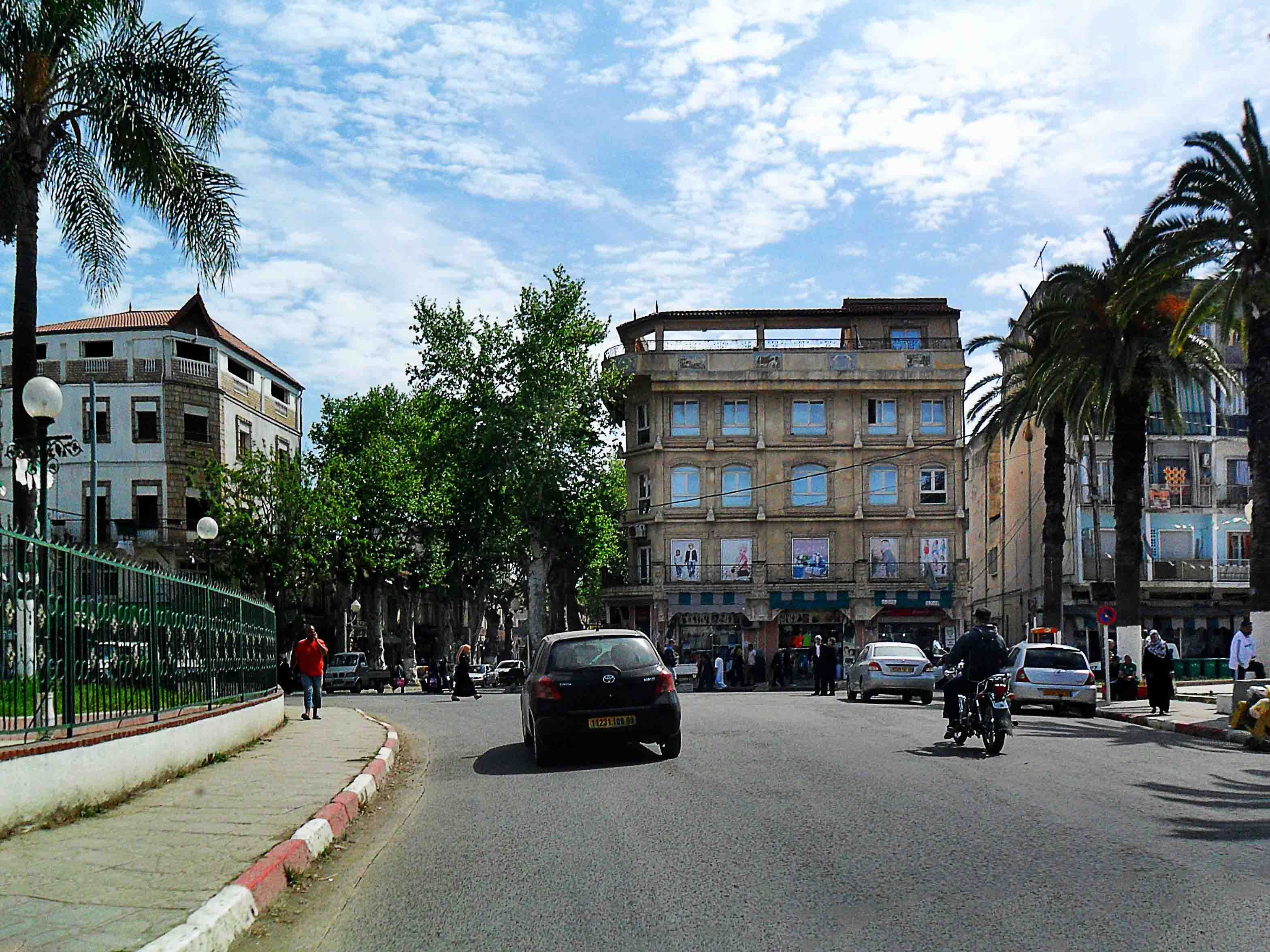
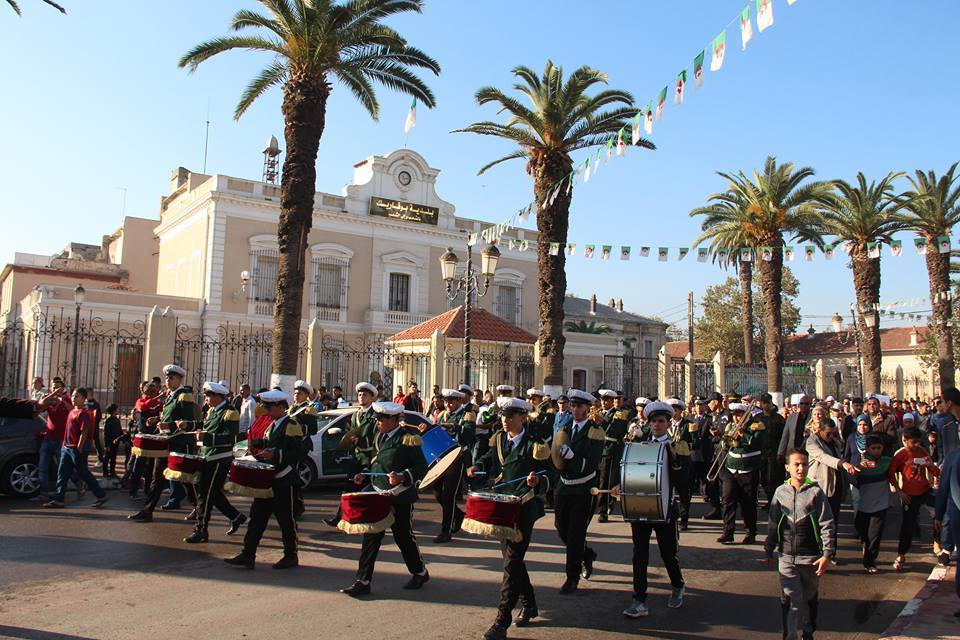
- Ali Ibn Abi Taleb Mosque City center of Boufarik Boufarik's Town hall in 2017

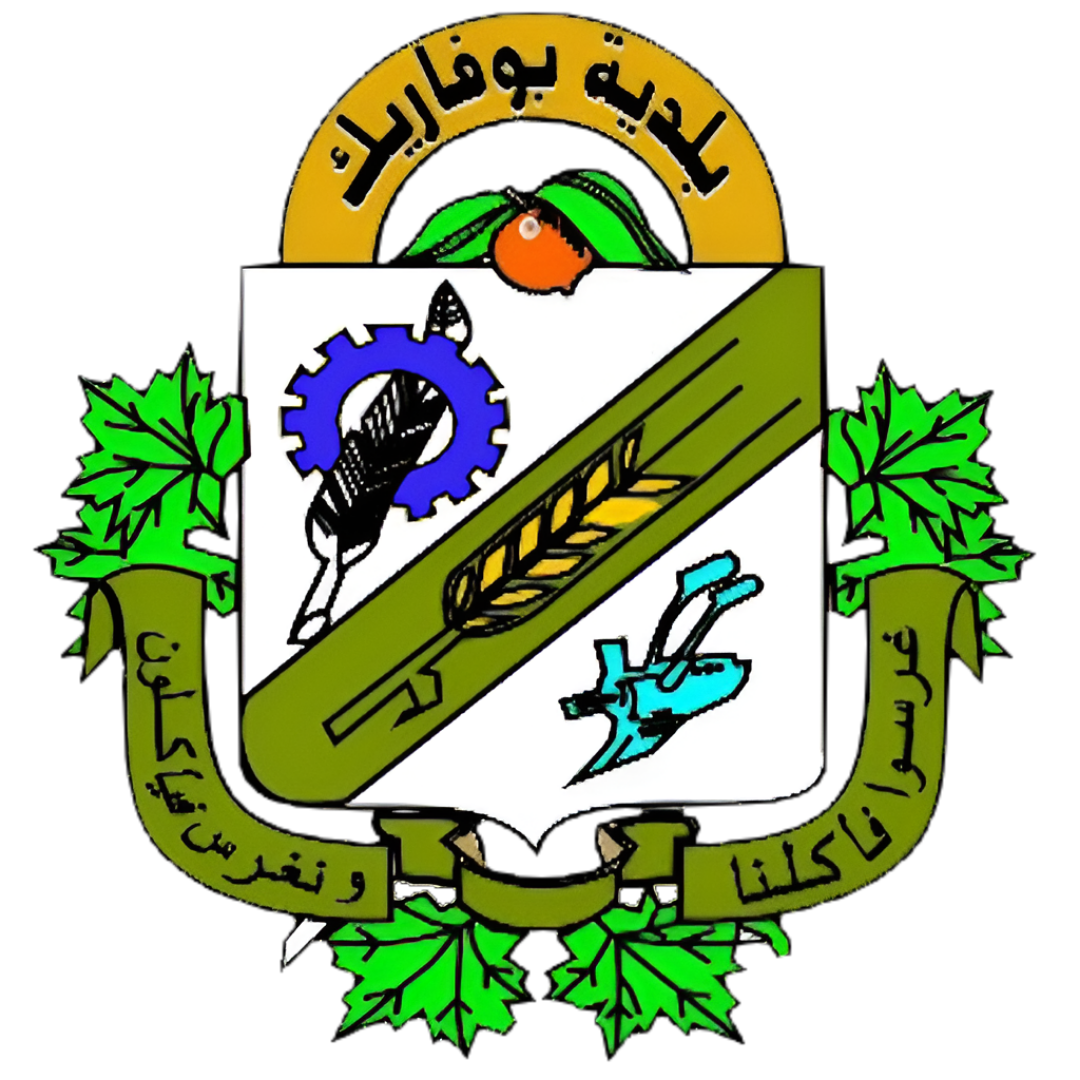
- Seal

- Location within Algeria
- Coordinates: 36°44′14″N 2°54′39″E
- Country: Algeria
- Province: Blida Province
- District: Boufarik District

Population (2008)
  - Total: 71,446
- Time zone: UTC+1 (CET)

Boufarik (Arabic: بوفاريك, Berber: Bufarik, Tifinagh: ⴱⵓ ⴼⴰⵔⵉⴽ) is a town in Blida Province, Algeria, approximately 30 km from Algiers. In 2008, its population was 57,162.

The major neighborhoods of the city are: K'ssar, Blatan, Ben gladash, Mimoun, Trig erange, Bariyan.

The commune, which is well known for the production of oranges, is the birthplace of Orangina.

== Notable residents ==
- Jean-Claude Beton, founder of Orangina.
- Jonathan Holden (1828-1906), vineyard owner.
- Pierre Martin Borély de la Sapie (1814-1895), born in Seyne, Colon in Algeria, farmer, first mayor of Boufarik (Algiers), mayor of Blida, officer of the Legion of Honor, general councilor of Algiers, president of the advisory commission of agriculture of the department of Algiers and member of numerous commissions.
- Léon Chiris (1839-1900), perfumery industrialist.
- Bob Walter (1856-1907), exotic dancer, race car driver.
- Joseph Serda (1880-1965), politician.

== See also ==
- Boufarik Airport
- Boufarik colonization monument
