= Béni Tamou =

Coordinates: 36°32′N 2°49′E

- Commune and town
- Interactive map of Béni Tamou
- Country: Algeria
- Province: Blida Province

Population (2008)
  - Total: 33,846
- Time zone: UTC+1 (CET)

Béni Tamou is a town and commune located in the Blida Province of northern Algeria. Situated in a region known for its agricultural and industrial activities, Béni Tamou plays an important role in the local economy. According to the 2008 census, the town had a population of 33,846 people. The area benefits from Blida Province ’s Mediterranean climate, which is characterized by mild, wet winters and hot, dry summers, making it suitable for the cultivation of various crops.

Historically, Blida Province, where Béni Tamou is located, has been a significant center of agriculture and trade in Algeria. Béni Tamou is also connected by road networks that link it to neighboring towns and cities, contributing to the mobility of residents and goods. Cultural and social life in the town is marked by traditional customs, local markets, and religious practices typical of the region. Due to its proximity to the provincial capital of Blida, residents often benefit from access to larger markets, educational institutions, and healthcare services.

The town’s growth over the years reflects broader trends in the region, as Algeria has experienced rapid population expansion and urban development in many areas. While its economy is primarily based on agriculture, efforts to improve local infrastructure and public services continue to shape Béni Tamou's future.
