= Yahia Boushaki (Shahid) =

Algerian revolutionary (1935-1960)

- Born: Yahia ben Abderrahmane ben Ali Boushaki; 1935; Thenia, French Algeria
- Died: 28 December 1960 (aged 24–25); Blida, French Algeria
- Cause of death: Combat
- Resting place: Souakria Cemetery, Blida, Algeria
- Known for: National Liberation Front; National Liberation Army; Toussaint Rouge; Algerian War
- Movement: FLN, ALN, OS, MTLD

Yahia Boushaki (1935 – 28 December 1960), commonly known as Si Omar or simply as Boushaki, was a prominent revolutionary leader during the Algerian war of independence as a member of the Front de Libération Nationale (FLN; National Liberation Front) that launched an armed revolt throughout Algeria and issued a proclamation calling for a sovereign Algerian state.

== Education ==
Boushaki was born in 1935 in the village of Soumâa south of the present city of Thenia, about 50 km east of the great city of Algiers, and his Sufi family descends from the Malikite theologian Sidi Boushaki (1394–1453), who founded the Zawiyet Sidi Boushaki in 1440 during the 15th century.

His father is Abderrahmane Boushaki (1883–1985), a veteran of the First World War (1914–1918) who returned from the Maginot Line with the rank of corporal of the Algerian skirmishers, while his mother is Khedaouedj Boumerdassi, descendant of Sufis and theologian Sidi Boumerdassi, who founded Zawiyet Sidi Boumerdassi in 1714 during the 18th century.

His grandfather Ali Boushaki (1855–1965) was Muqaddam of Tariqa Rahmaniyyah in Lower Kabylia and his paternal and maternal uncles were Muslim imams as were his cousins.

He then received a religious education according to the Algerian Islamic reference as well as a political consciousness according to the ideology of Algerian independence nationalism through his paternal uncle Mohamed Seghir Boushaki (1869–1959), who was an elected municipal councilor from 1919 to 1939.

In addition to his academic activity in this Sufi environment under the immediate patronage of Imam Brahim Boushaki (1912–1997), he worked in agriculture and animal husbandry near the surrounding villages of Meraldene, Tabrahimt, Gueddara, Azela and Mahrane.

== Political activity ==
From his adolescence, his desire to join the ranks of clandestine separatist activities within the Algerian nationalism was clearly manifested.

It was inspired by the failure of the political activities advocated by the political process that followed the proclamation of the 30th petition for Civil and political rights on 18 July 1920, which sought to obtain these rights of the indigenous Algerians at the same time, on an equal footing with European settlers in Algeria, and whose failure was consummated by the massacres of May 1945.

He then joined the Movement for the Movement for the Triumph of Democratic Liberties (MTLD) and the Special Organization (OS) to prepare the insurrection against French colonialism.

== Military combat ==
As soon as the Algerian revolution broke out, he joined the ranks of the National Liberation Front (FLN) as a political commissar, and the National Liberation Army (ALN) as a soldier and later as a military officer in Kabylia and in Mitidja plain.

Captain Boushaki initiated extensive sabotage operations of colonial properties and participated with his soldiers in several battles between Thenia and Bouira against French paratroopers, resulting in the destruction of several combat aircraft belonging to the French Air Force.

He synchronized his operations in concert with the command of the military region based in the Zbarbar forest where his friend the journalist Mohamed Aïchaoui (1921–1959) was entrenched.

== Death ==
Boushaki prepared in the Blida Province with a command of the National Liberation Army (ALN) an operation against the French Armed Forces during the month of December 1960 in order to deconfine the repressive pressure against the mujahideen maquis east of Algiers, Mitidja and Kabylie.

This great operation took place just after the demonstrations of December 1960, which put an end to the myth of French Algeria by opening the way to the establishment of a sovereign and independent Algeria, and this is how the new year was celebrated, bring with it the hint of Algerian self-determination, accentuating the pressure of the guerrillas on the colonial troops.

Thus, while captain of a Moussebel unit, he was killed in combat in Meftah on 28 December 1960, during the battle of Souakria along with Abdelkader Madjène and other Mujahideen, the rest of the unit blending in with the surrounding maquis.

== Tributes ==
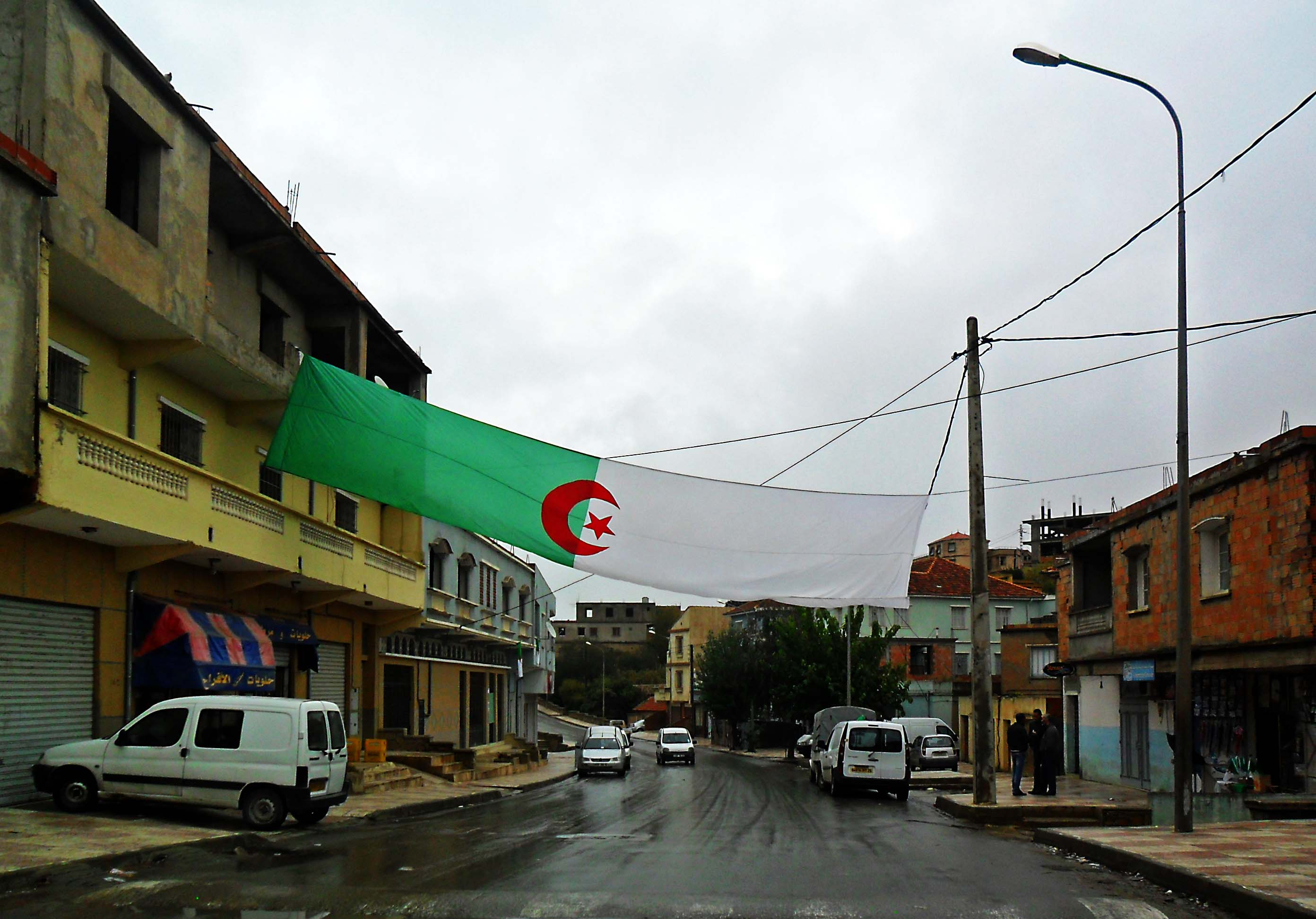
Yahia Boushaki Street

He gave his name to an important district of Algiers north of the El Alia Cemetery in the municipality of Bab Ezzouar and which bears the name of the Chinatown named Yahia Boushaki.

He also gave his posthumous name to a street in Thenia in the Boumerdès Province that bears the name of Yahia Boushaki Street, the former Avenue Jean Colonna d'Ornano.

A promotion of officers of the Algerian People's National Army (ANP) was named the Yahia Boushaki Promotion in 1995 during their training at the École Supérieure de la Défense Aérienne du Territoire (ESDAT). Four promotions of officers of the Gendarmerie Nationale (GN) were appointed Promotions of Yahia Boushaki as of 16 June 2008.

General Abdelmalek Guenaizia (1936–2019), accompanied by various ministers of the Algerian government, personally bestowed the name of Yahia Boushaki on the active elements of these four promotions. In Algeria and in the Wilaya IV historique, he is considered a national hero.

== See also ==
- Yahia Boushaki (neighbourhood in Algiers)
- Yahia Boushaki tram stop (tram stop in Algiers)
- List of Algerians
- Ministry of Mujahideen
- National Mujahideen Organization
- National Organization for the Children of the Martyrs
- National Organization for the Sons of the Mujahideen
