= Blida Province =

Province of Algeria

Blida Province ولاية البليدة
- Province
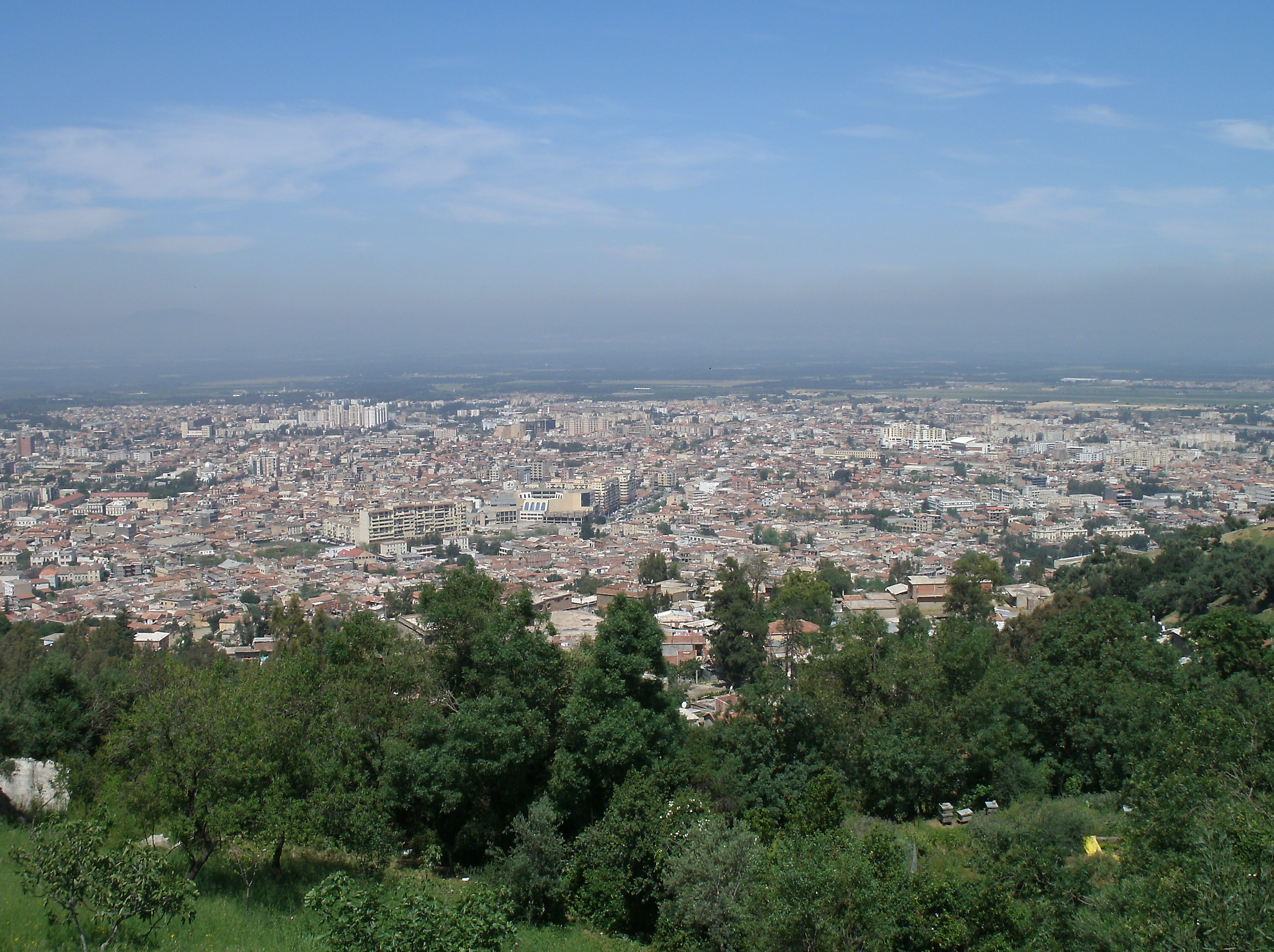
- The capital city, Blida

- Map of Algeria highlighting Blida
- Coordinates: 36°28′N 02°49′E
- Country: Algeria
- Capital: Blida

Government
  - PPA president: Mr. Kahla Mustapha (FLN)
  - Wāli: Mr. Ouadah Hocine

Area
  - Total: 1,479 km^{2} (571 sq mi)
- Elevation: 257 m (843 ft)

Population (2008)
  - Total: 1,009,892
  - Density: 682.8/km^{2} (1,768/sq mi)
- Time zone: UTC+01 (CET)
- Area Code: +213 (0) 25
- ISO 3166 code: DZ-09
- Districts: 10
- Municipalities: 25

Blida (Arabic: ولاية البليدة) is a province (wilaya) in Algeria. Its capital is Blida. The Chréa National Park is situated here.

== History ==
The province was created from parts of Alger (department) and El Asnam department in 1974.

In 1984 Tipaza Province was carved out of its territory.

== Administrative divisions ==
It is made up of 10 districts and 25 municipalities.

The districts are:

1. Blida
2. Boufarik
3. Bougara
4. Bouïnian
5. El Affroun
6. Larbaâ
7. Meftah
8. Mouzaïa
9. Oued El Alleug
10. Ouled Yaïch

The municipalities are:

1. Aïn Romana
2. Ben Khéllil
3. Blida
4. Bouarfa
5. Boufarik
6. Bougara
7. Bouïnian
8. Béni Mered
9. Béni Tamou
10. Chiffa
11. Chréa
12. Chébli
13. Djebabra (Djebara)
14. El Affroun
15. Guerrouaou
16. Hammam Melouane
17. Larbaâ
18. Meftah
19. Mouzaïa
20. Oued Djer
21. Oued El Alleug
22. Ouled Selama
23. Ouled Yaïch
24. Souhane
25. Soumaâ

== Villages ==
The villages of Blida Province are:

- Souakria

== Natural features ==
This province has one of the few habitat areas in Algeria that supports a sub-population of the Barbary macaque, Macaca sylvanus.

== Notable people ==
- Mhamed Yazid (1923–2003), politician
- Mahfoud Nahnah (1942–2003), leader and politician
- Mohamed Baba Ameur (1893–1976), theologian
- Mohamed Bouslimani (politician and martyr) (1941–1993)
- Yahia Boushaki (Shahid) (1935–1960), leader and martyr
