= Soumaâ =

Soumaâ صومعة
- Commune and town
- Location in Algeria
- Country: Algeria
- Province: Blida Province

Population (2008)
  - Total: 37,461
- Time zone: UTC+1 (CET)

Soumaâ is a town and commune in Blida Province, Algeria. It had a population of 31,451 in 1998 and a population of 37,461 in 2008. On August 27, 1985, a group of MIA insurgents led by Mustafa Bouyali attacked a police school in the town and killed an officer.
