= Bouinan =

- Commune and town
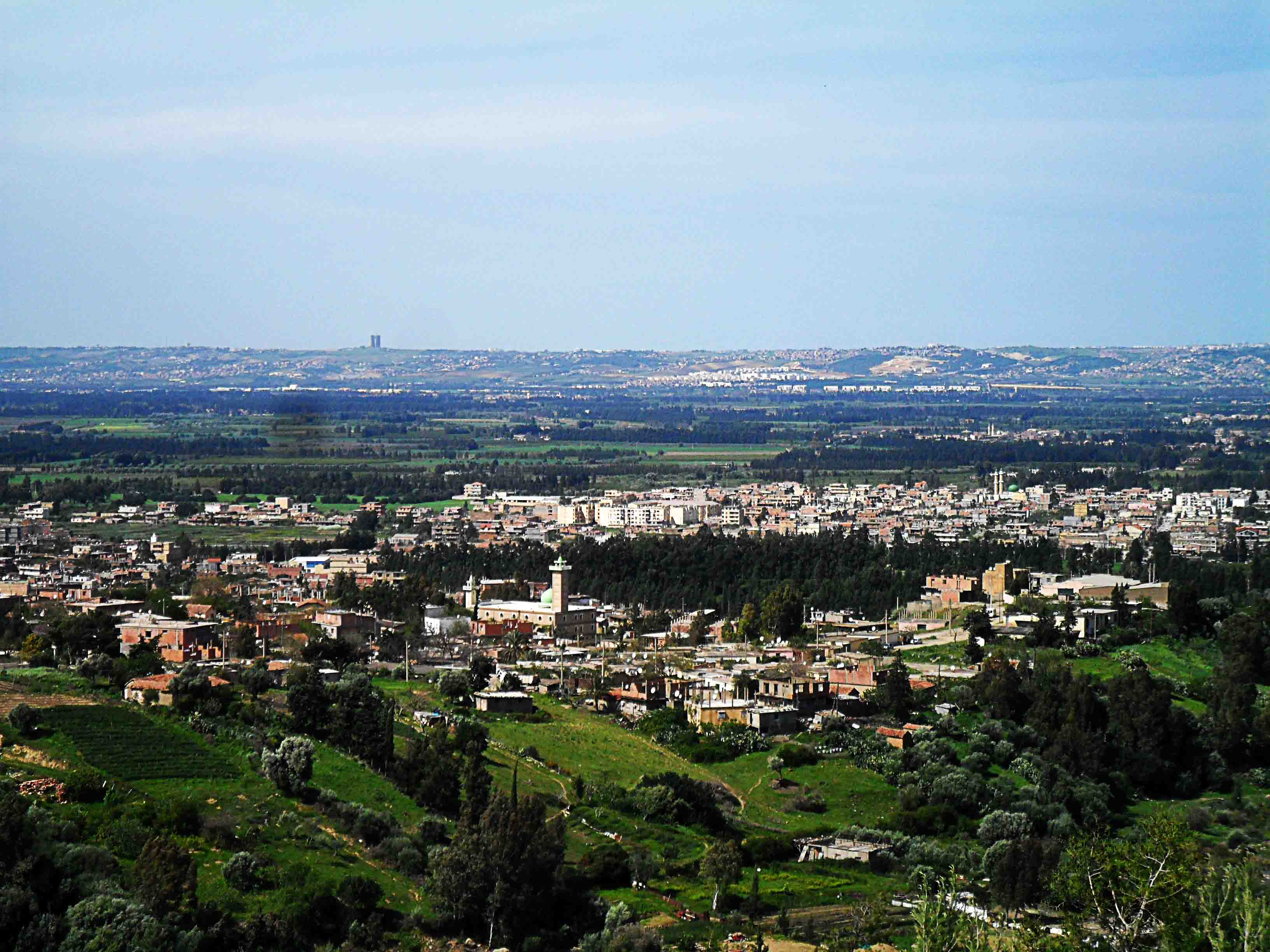

- Location in Algeria
- Coordinates: 36°31′50″N 2°59′30″E
- Country: Algeria
- Province: Blida Province
- Time zone: UTC+1 (CET)

Bouinan is a town and commune in Blida Province, Algeria.
