= Ouled Selama =

Coordinates: 36°32′54″N 3°06′36″E

- Commune and town
- Interactive map of Ouled Selama
- Country: Algeria
- Province: Blida Province

Population (2008)
  - Total: 27,573
- Time zone: UTC+1 (CET)

Ouled Selama or Ouled Slama is a town and commune in Blida Province, Algeria. According to the 2008 census it has a population of 27,573.
