= Aïn Romana =

Coordinates: 36°25′14″N 2°42′42″E

- Commune and town
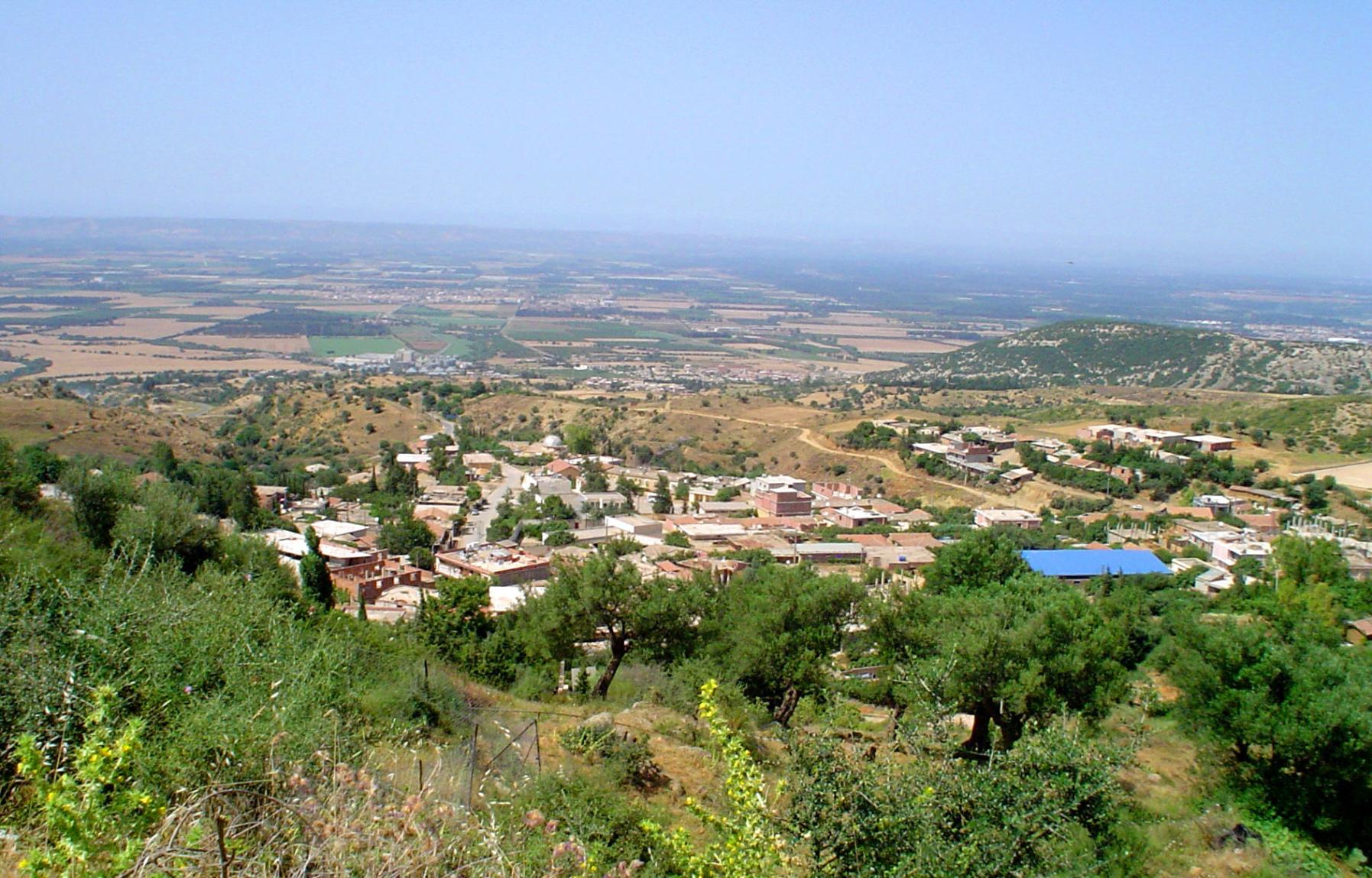
- Interactive map of Aïn Romana
- Country: Algeria
- Province: Blida Province

Population (1998)
  - Total: 9,667
- Time zone: UTC+1 (CET)

Aïn Romana is a town and commune in Blida Province, Algeria. According to the 1998 census it has a population of 9,667.
