= Oued El Alleug =

Ouled El Alleug واد العلايق
- Commune and town
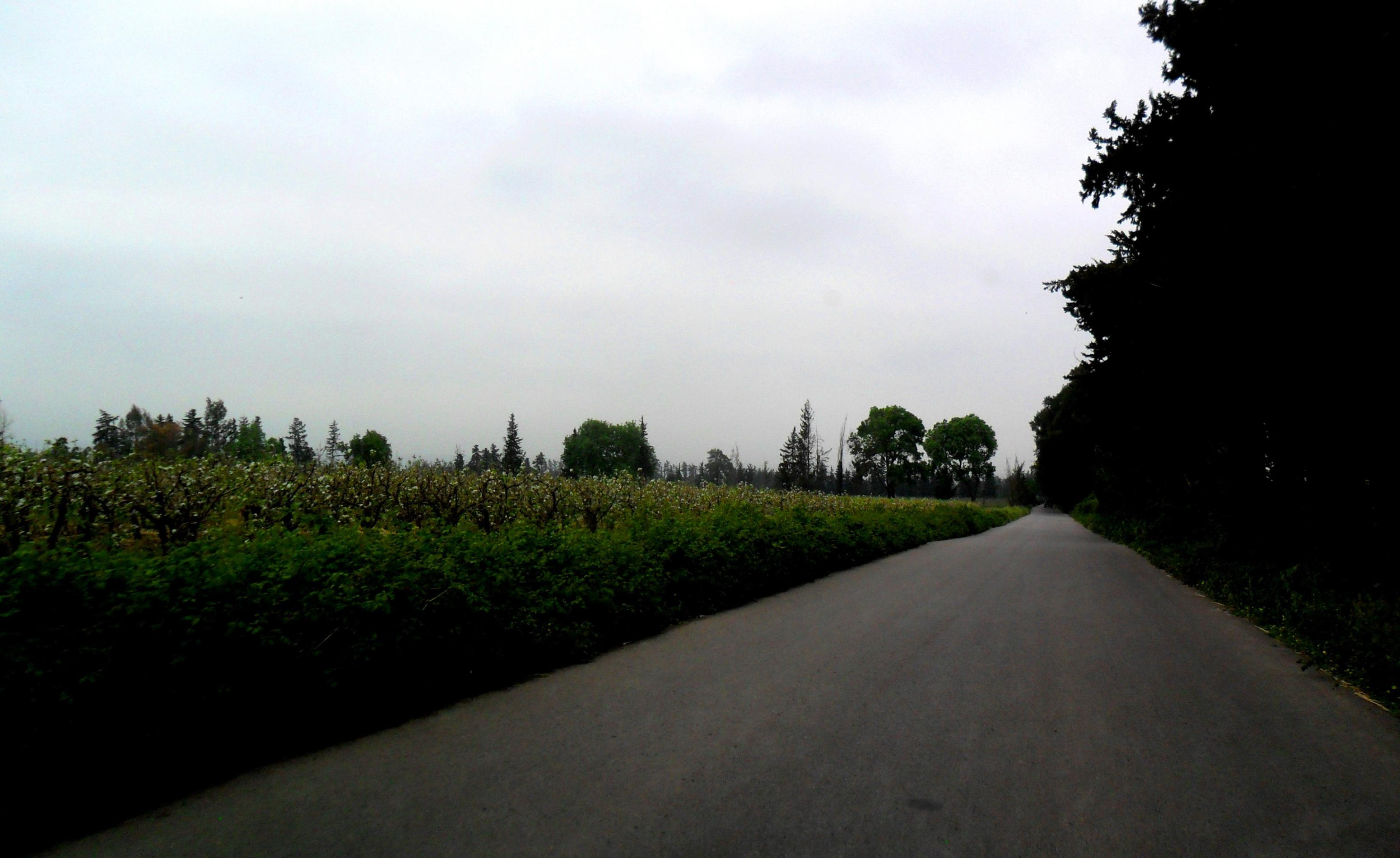
- Oued El Alleug
- Interactive map of Ouled El Alleug
- Country: Algeria
- Province: Blida Province
- Elevation: 154 ft (47 m)

Population (1998)
  - Total: 33,915
  - Density: 990/sq mi (383/km^{2})
- Time zone: UTC+1 (CET)

Ouled El Alleug is a town and commune in Blida Province, Algeria. It is at 36.55528°N 2.79028°E. According to the 1998 census it has a population of 33,915. The population density is 383 persons per kilometer.

The height of Oued el Alleug is 47 meters above sea level. The land around the Oued el Alleug with mostly flat, but to the northern-west are hills. February is the wettest month, with an average of 169mm of rain, while June is almost completely dry.

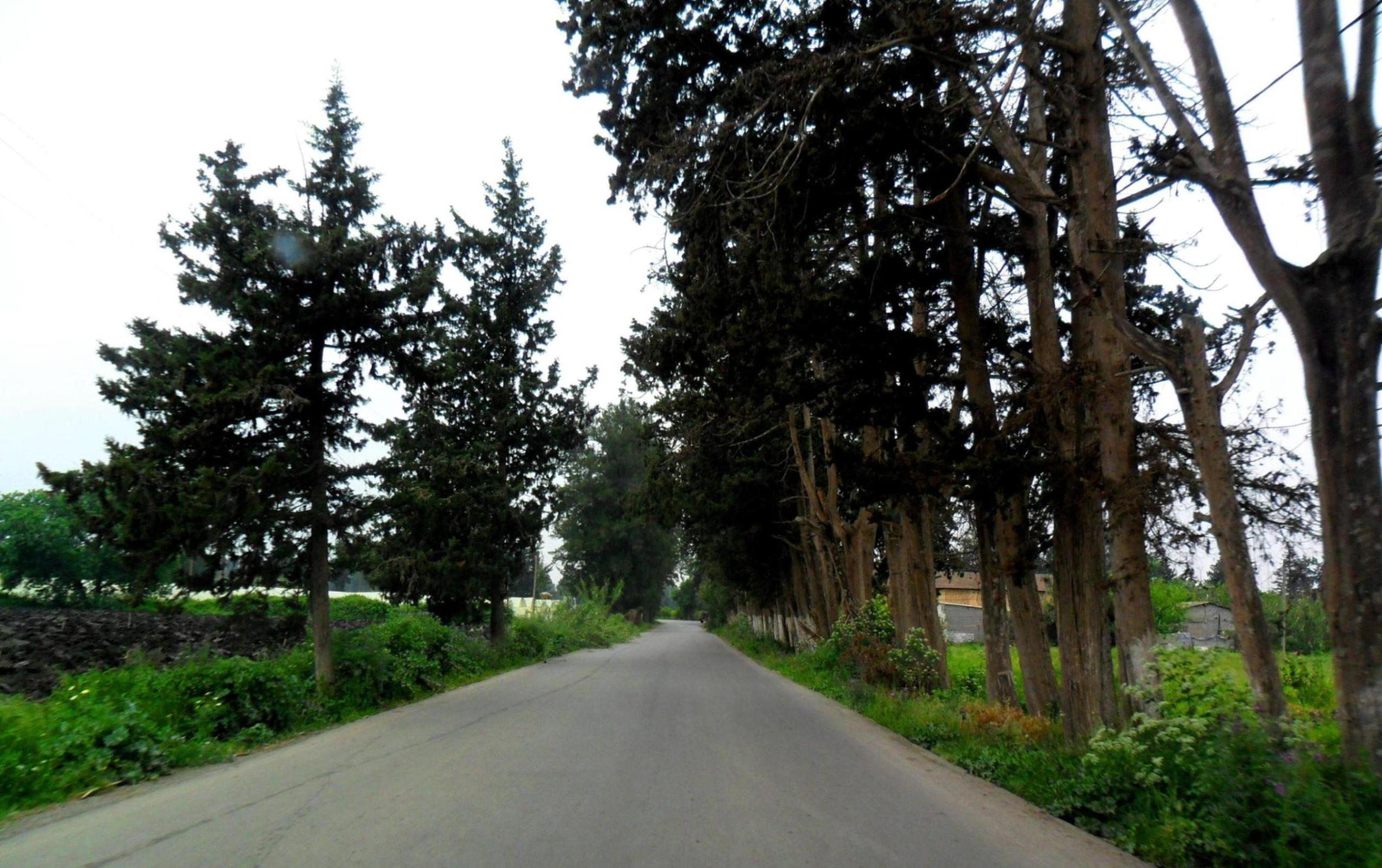
Oued El Alleug panorama

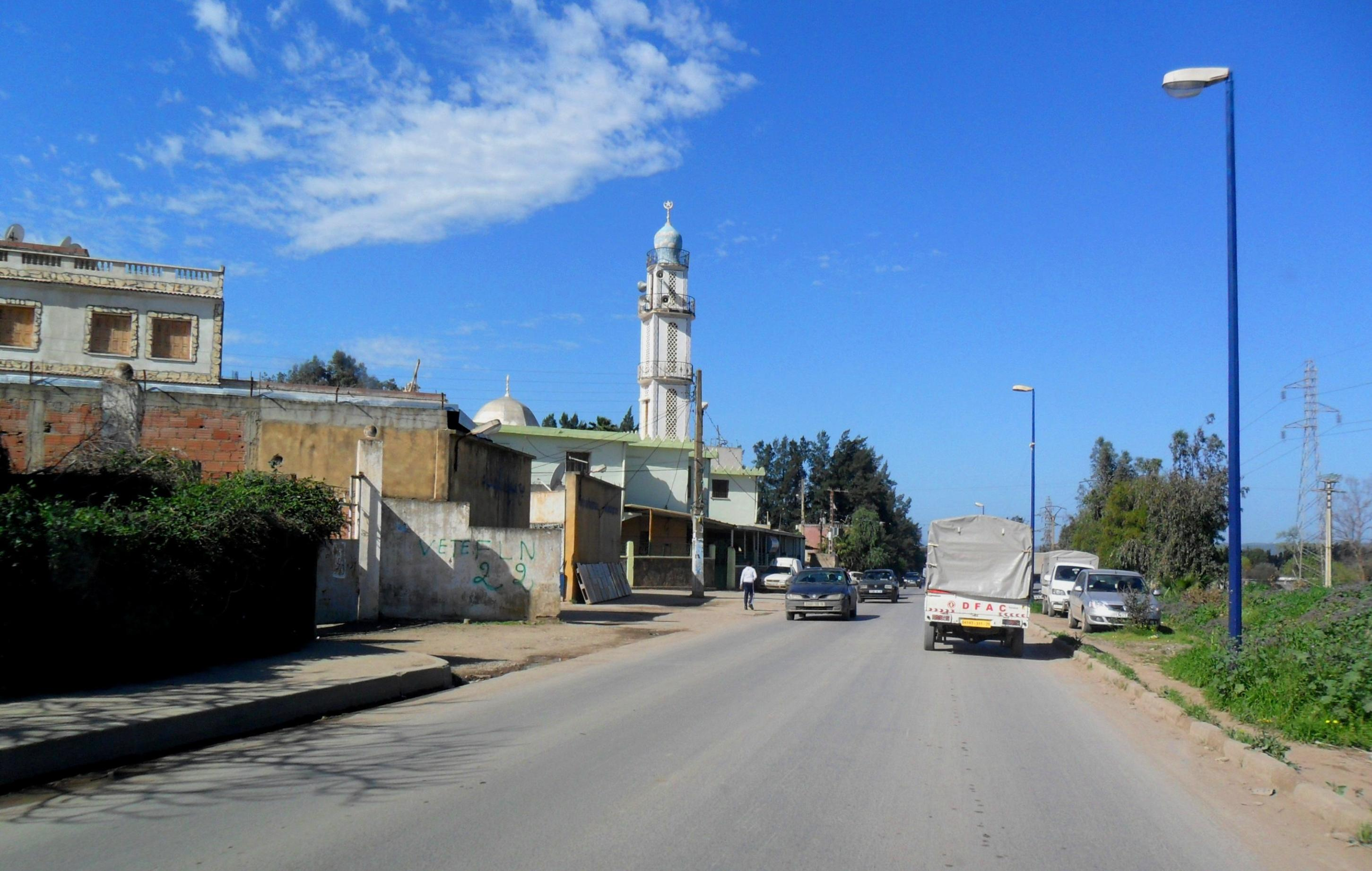
Oued El Alleug
