= Oued Djer =

val’ Djer واد جر
- Commune and town
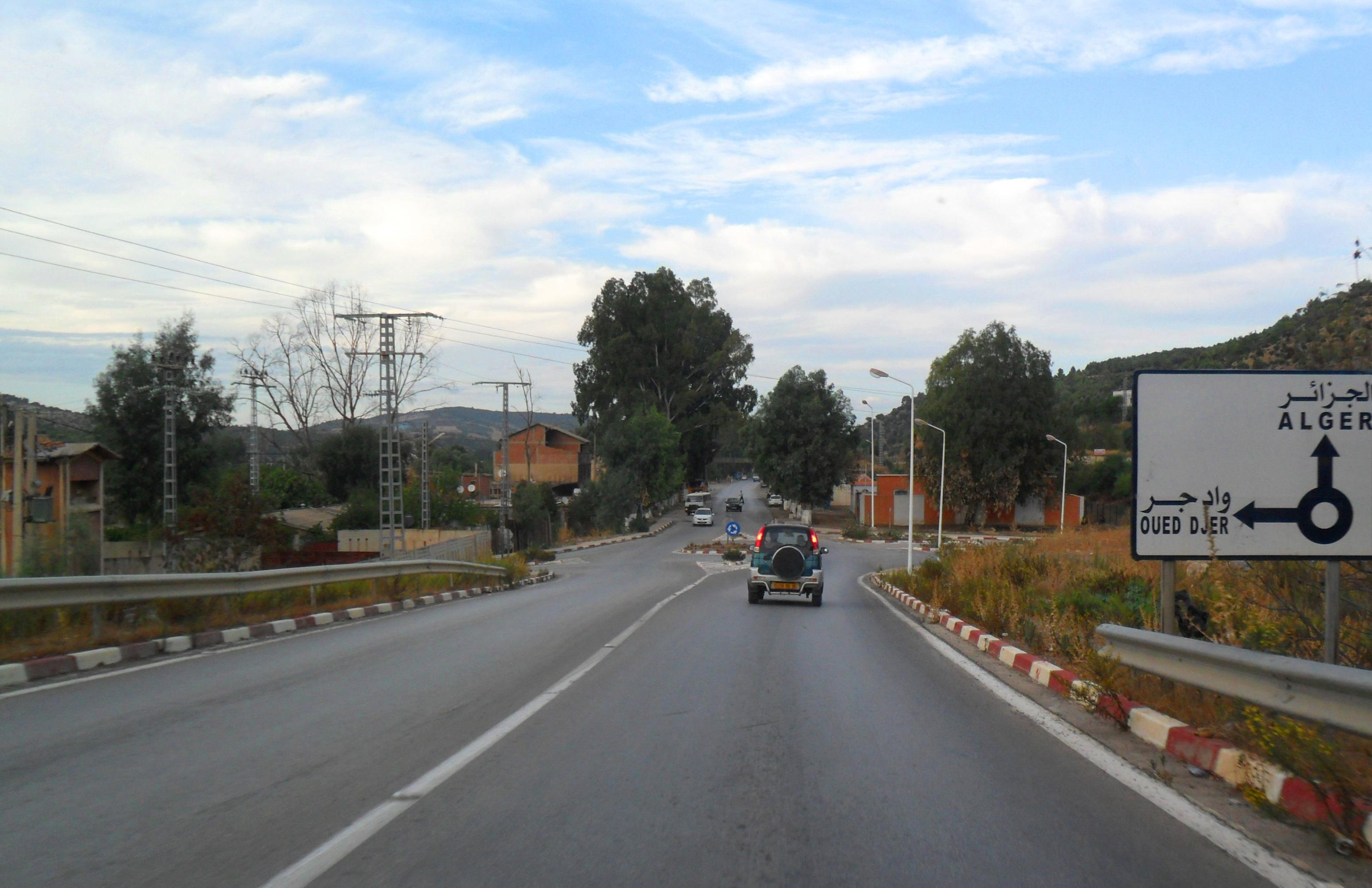

- Location within Algeria
- Country: Algeria
- Province: Blida Province

Population (1998)
  - Total: 5,373
- Time zone: UTC+1 (CET)
- Postal code: 09032

Oued Djer is a Village and commune in Blida Province, Algeria. According to the 1998 census it has a population of 5373 .
