= Djebabra =

Coordinates: 36°35′03″N 03°16′13″E

Djebabra in Arabic الجبابرة
- Commune and town
- Interactive map of Djebabra in Arabic الجبابرة
- Country: Algeria
- Province: Blida Province

Population (1998)
  - Total: 2,444
- Time zone: UTC+1 (CET)

Djebabra is a town and commune in Blida Province, Algeria. According to the 1998 census it has a population of 2,444.
