= Chébli =

Coordinates: 36°34′40″N 3°00′30″E

Chebli الشبلي Shabli
- Commune and town
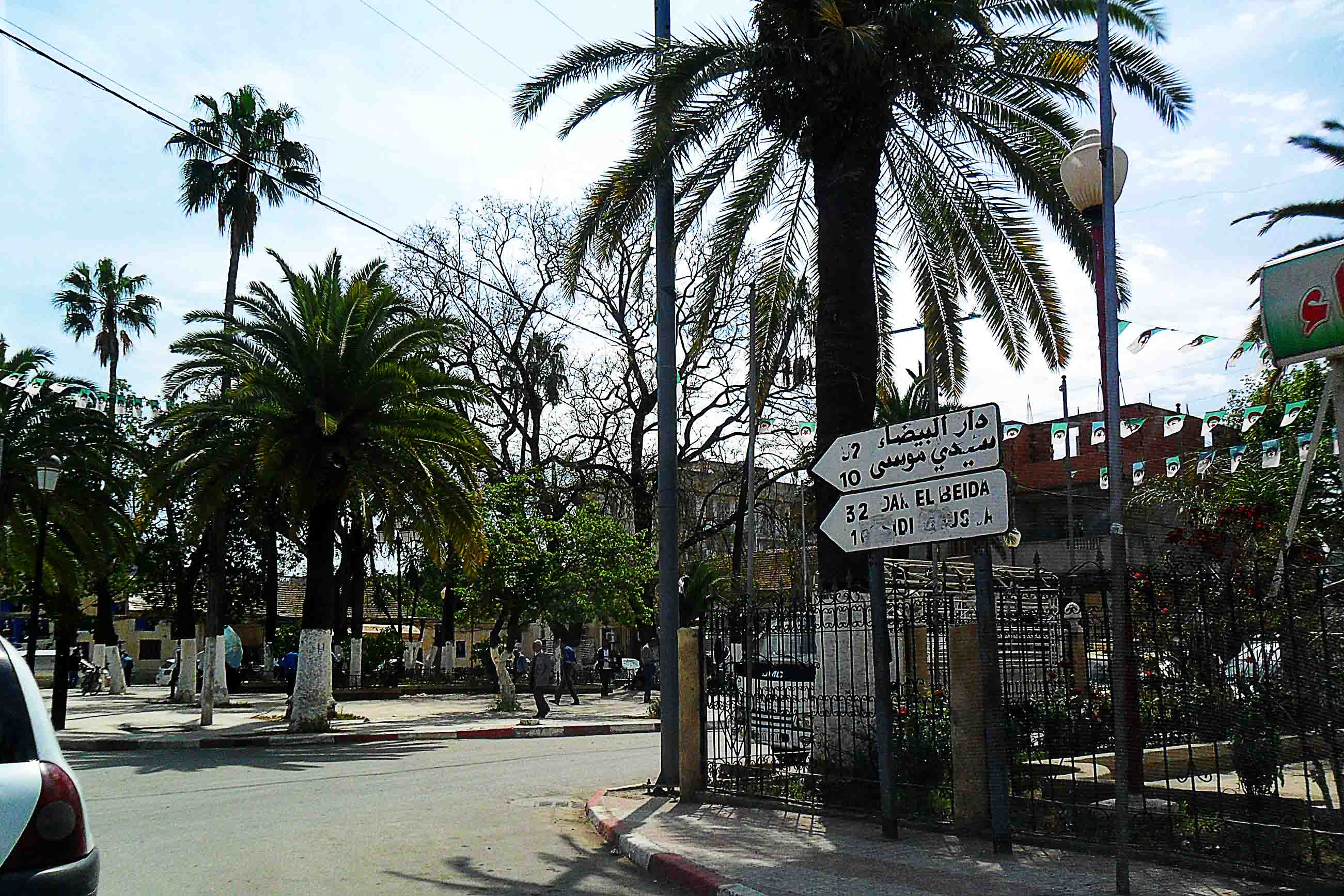
- Interactive map of Chebli
- Country: Algeria
- Province: Blida Province

Population (1998)
  - Total: 21,506
- Time zone: UTC+1 (CET)

Chebli (Arabic: الشبلي Shabli) is a town and commune in Blida Province, Algeria. According to the 1998 census it has a population of 21,506.
