= Mouzaïa =

Coordinates: 36°28′N 2°41′E

- Commune and town
- Interactive map of Mouzaïa
- Country: Algeria
- Province: Blida Province

Population (2008)
  - Total: 28,552
- Time zone: UTC+1 (CET)
- Area code: 09
- Website: http://mouzaia.com/

Mouzaïa is a town and commune in Blida Province, Algeria. According to the 2008 census it has a population of 28,552.
