= Guerrouaou =

Coordinates: 36°31′N 2°53′E

- Commune and town
- Interactive map of Guerrouaou
- Country: Algeria
- Province: Blida Province
- Time zone: UTC+1 (CET)

Guerrouaou is a town and commune in Blida Province, Algeria.
