= El Affroun =

Coordinates: 36°28′N 2°38′E

- Commune and town
- Interactive map of El Affroun
- Country: Algeria
- Province: Blida Province

Population (2008)
  - Total: 42,627
- Time zone: UTC+1 (CET)

El Affroun العفرون البليدة is a town and commune in Blida Province, Algeria. According to the 2022 census it has a population of 42,627

.
