= Bouarfa, Algeria =

Coordinates: 36°28′01″N 2°48′59″E

Bouarfa
- Commune and town
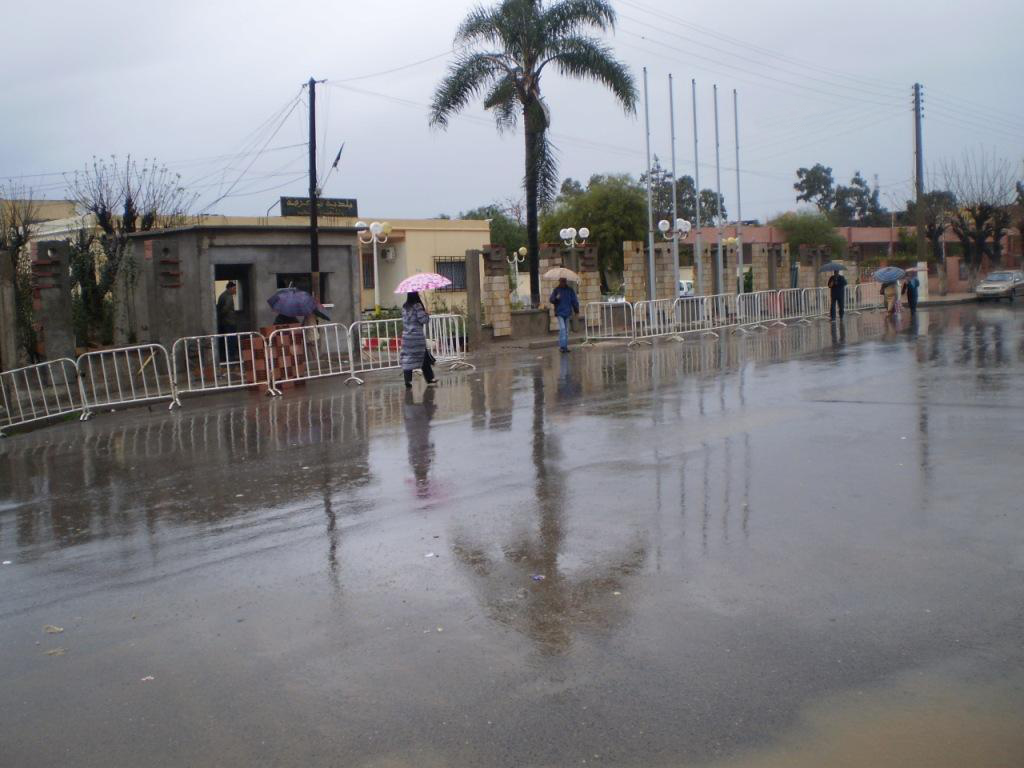
- Bouarfa, Algeria (2010-03-08)
- Interactive map of Bouarfa
- Country: Algeria
- Province: Blida Province

Population (1998)
  - Total: 30,258
- Time zone: UTC+1 (CET)

Bouarfa is a town and commune in Blida Province, Algeria. According to the 1998 census it has a population of 30,258.
