= Hammam Melouane =

Coordinates: 36°29′12″N 3°02′42″E

- Commune and town
- Interactive map of Hammam Melouane
- Country: Algeria
- Province: Blida Province

Population (1998)
  - Total: 4,551
- Time zone: UTC+1 (CET)

Hammam Melouane is a town and commune in Blida Province, Algeria. According to the 1998 census it has a population of 4,551.
