= Meftah (town) =

- Commune and town
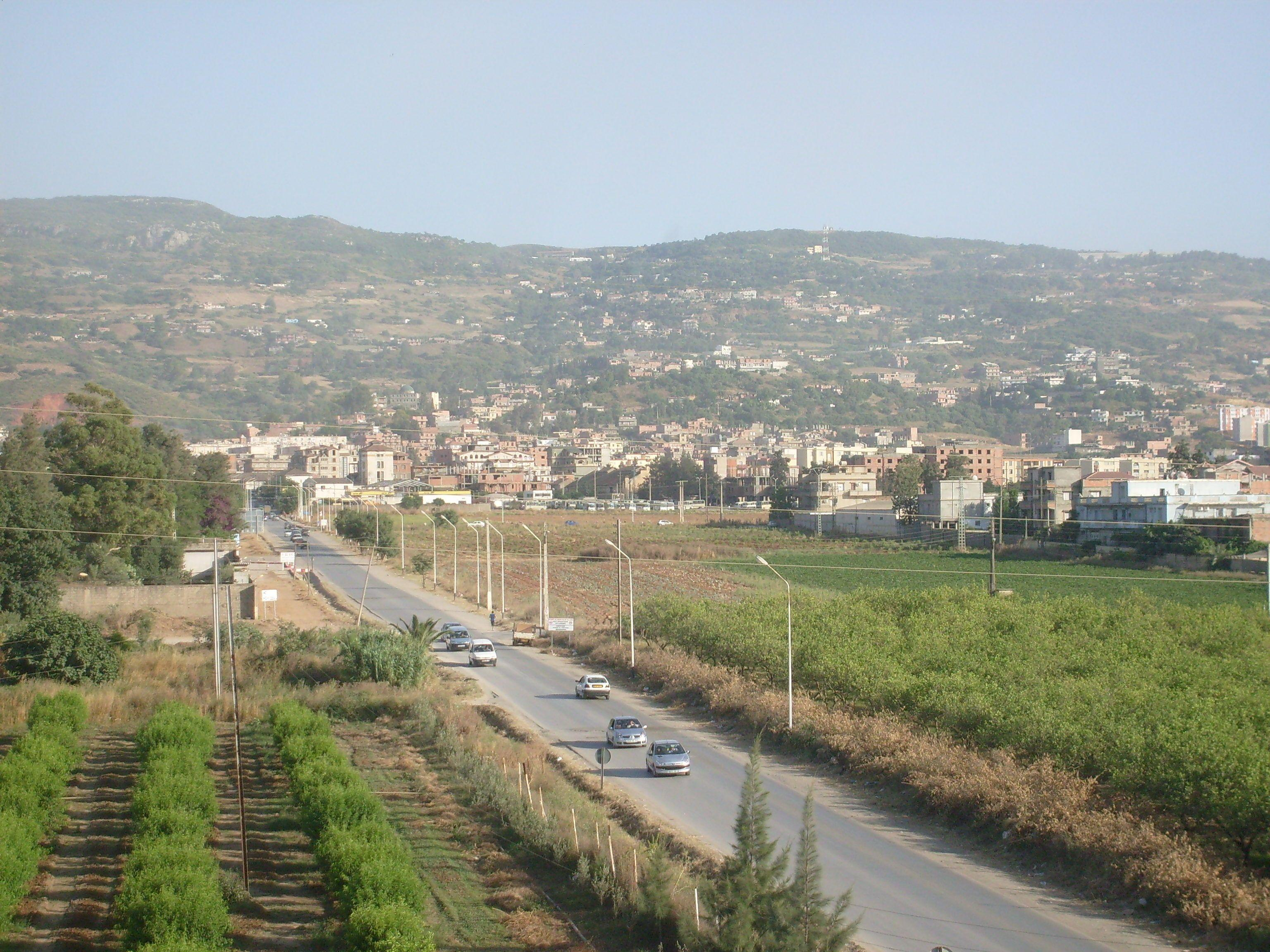
- Entrance to Meftah

- Location within Algeria
- Coordinates: 36°37′N 3°14′E
- Country: Algeria
- Province: Blida Province

Population (2008)
  - Total: 40,878
- Time zone: UTC+1 (CET)

Meftah is a town and commune in Blida Province, Algeria. According to the 2008 census it has a population of 40,878.

== Notable people ==
- Djamel Bouaïcha - professional footballer
- Noureddine Drioueche - professional footballer
- Abdelmalek Droukdel - Islamic militant
- Yahia Boushaki (Shahid) - militant and shahid
- Zoubir Zmit - professional footballer
