= Chiffa =

Coordinates: 36°28′N 002°45′E

Chiffa الشفة
- Commune and town
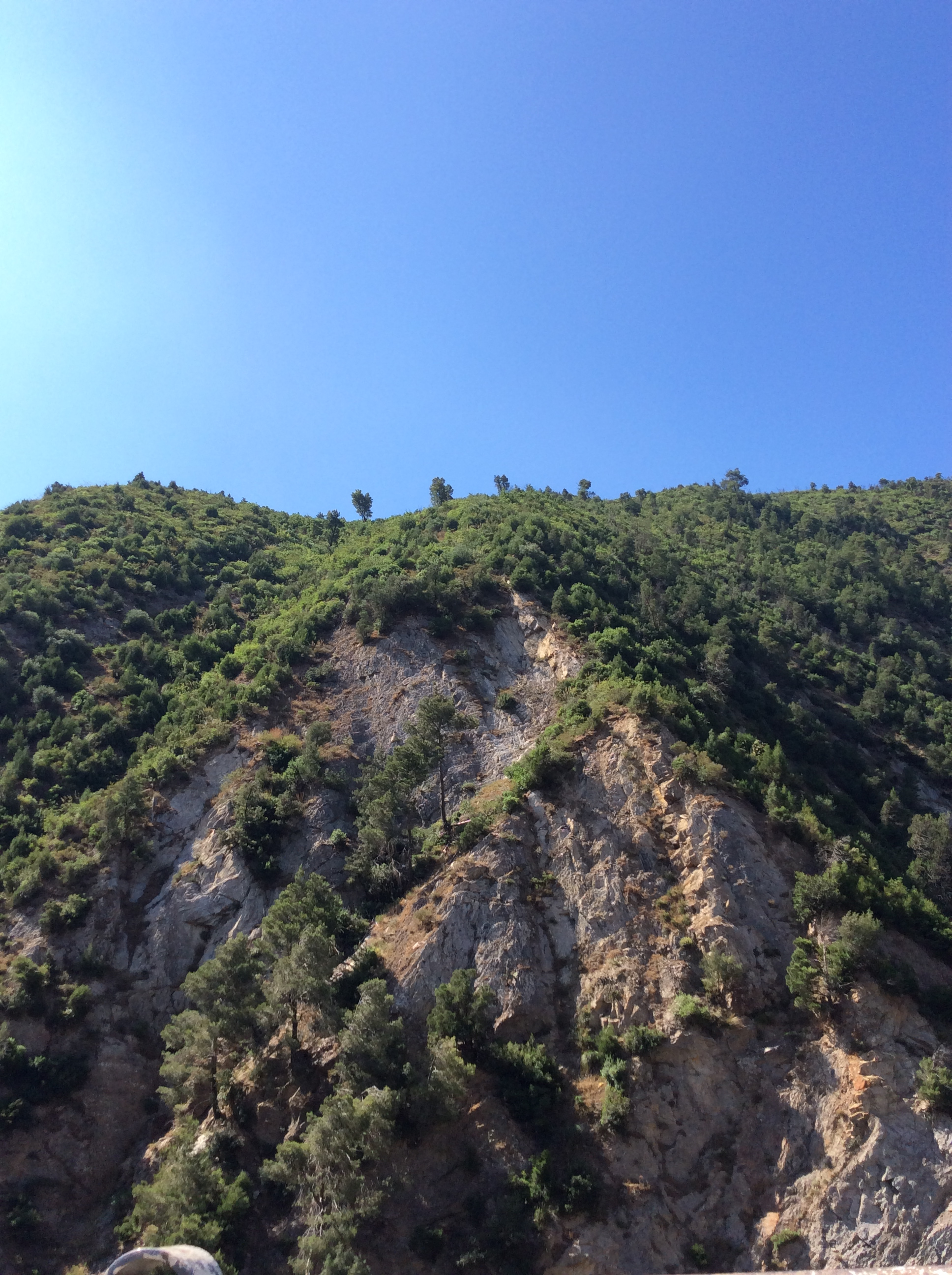
- Interactive map of Chiffa
- Country: Algeria
- Province: Blida Province
- Time zone: UTC+1 (CET)

Chiffa is a town and gorge in the Tell Atlas Mountains of northern Algeria. This gorge is one of the few habitat areas in Algeria that supports a sub-population of the Barbary macaque, Macaca sylvanus.
