= Blida =

Blida Arabic: البليدة Tamazight: ⵍⴻⴱⵍⵉⴷⴰ
- City
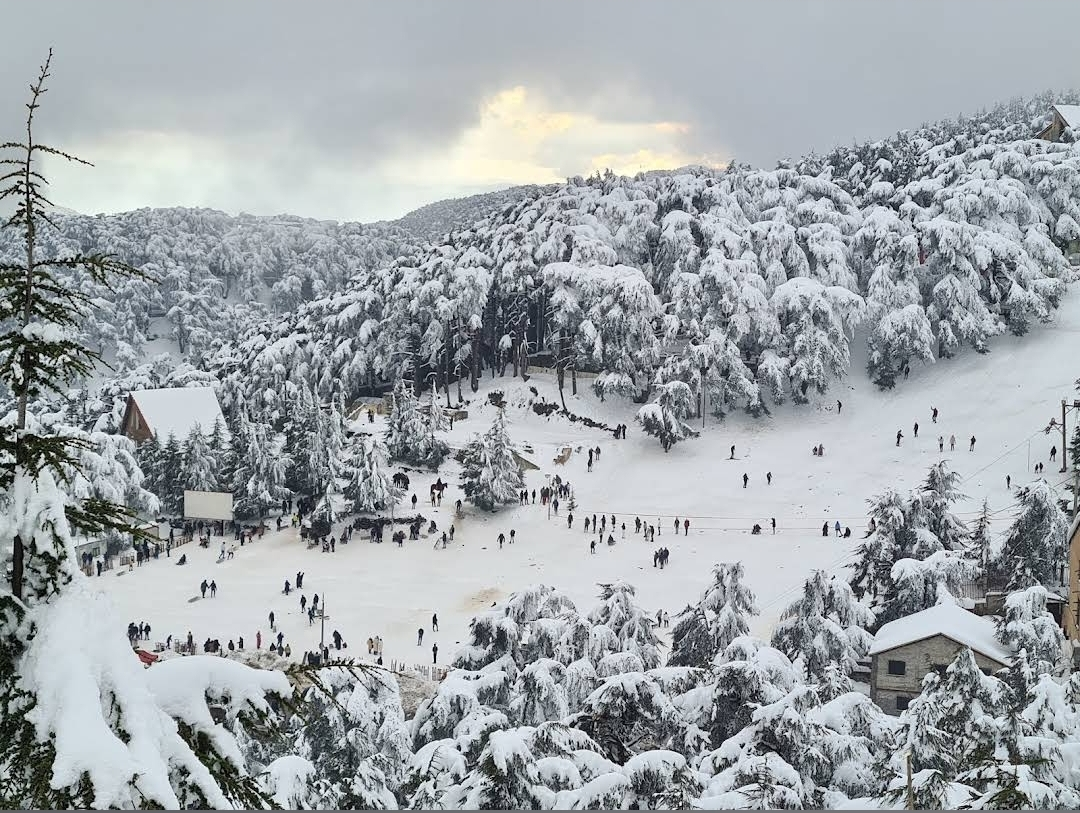
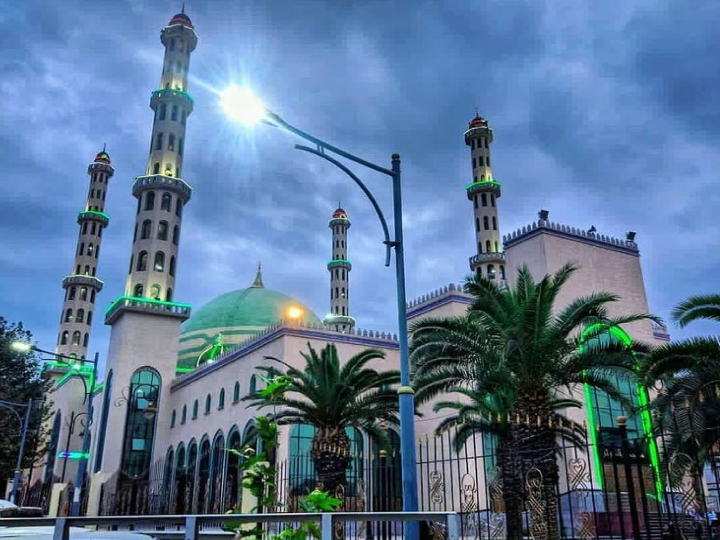
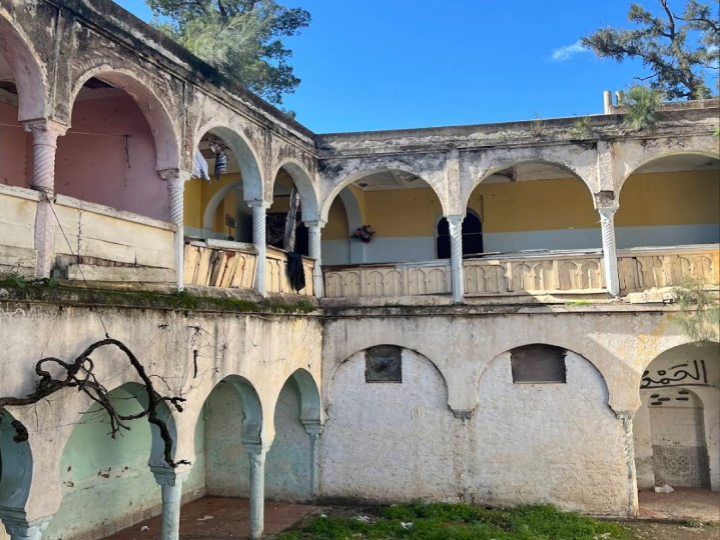
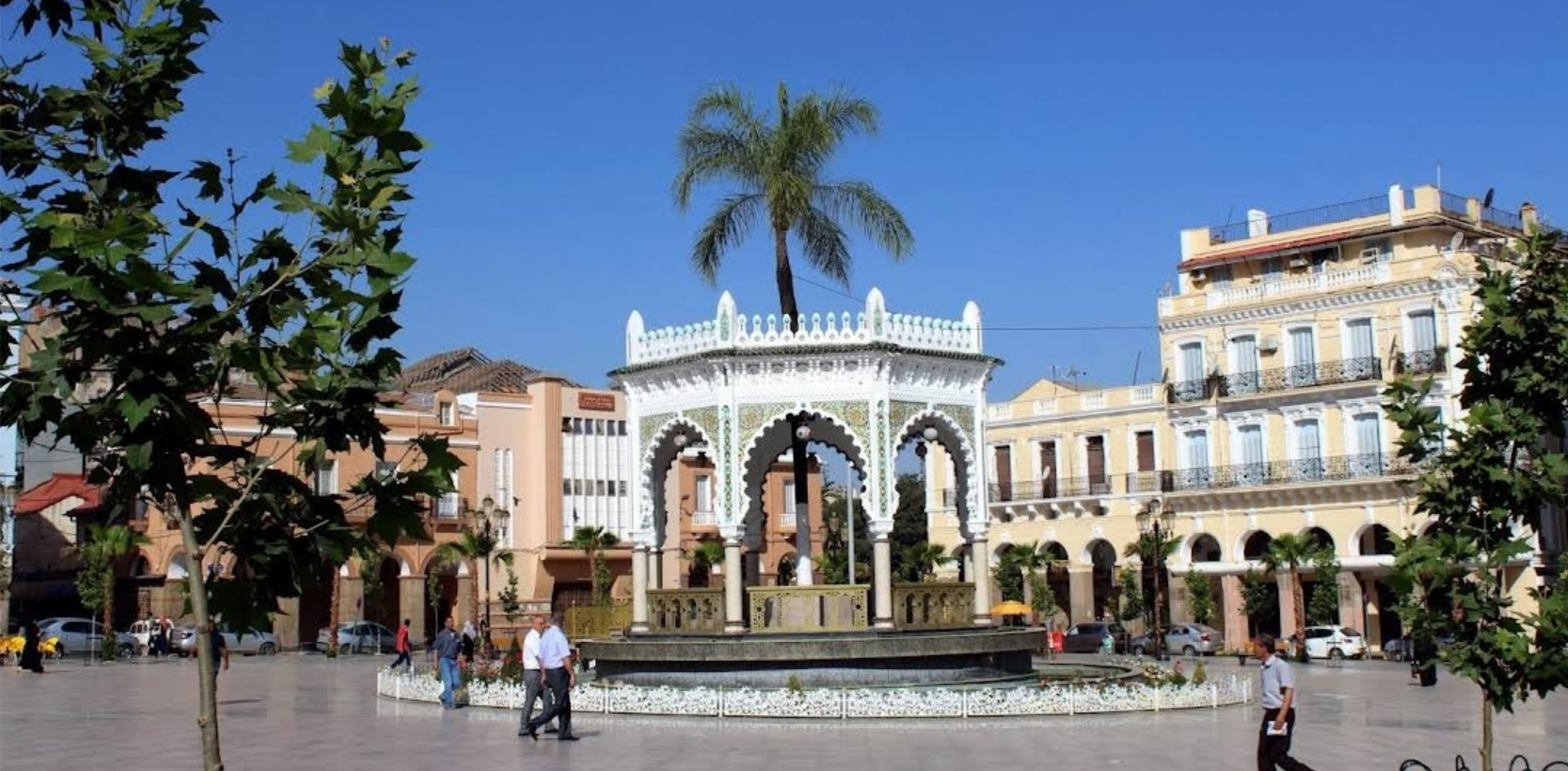
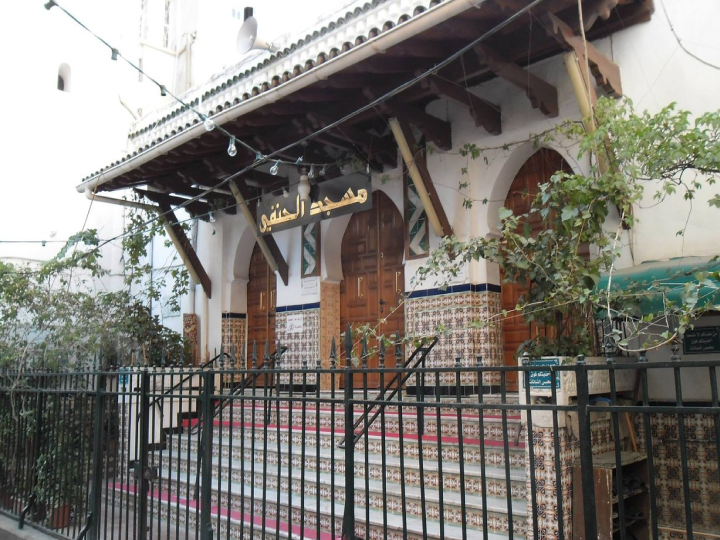
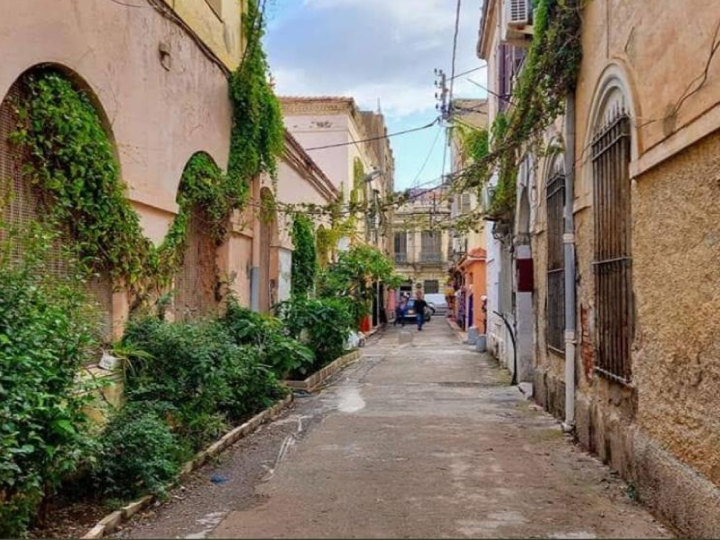
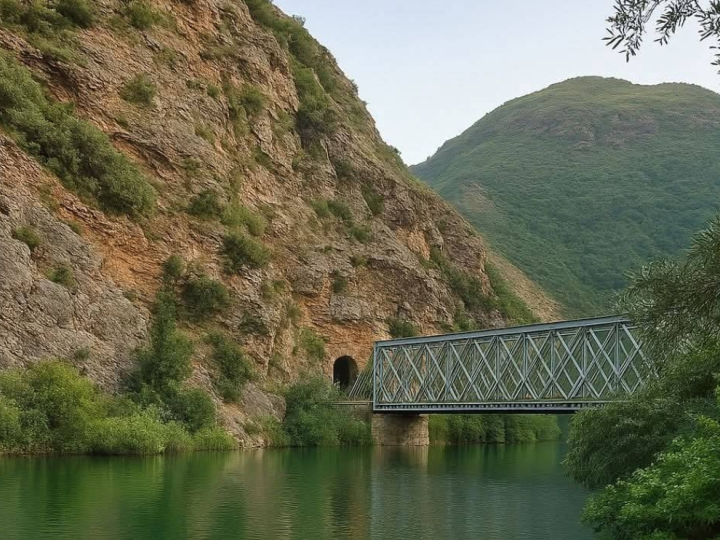
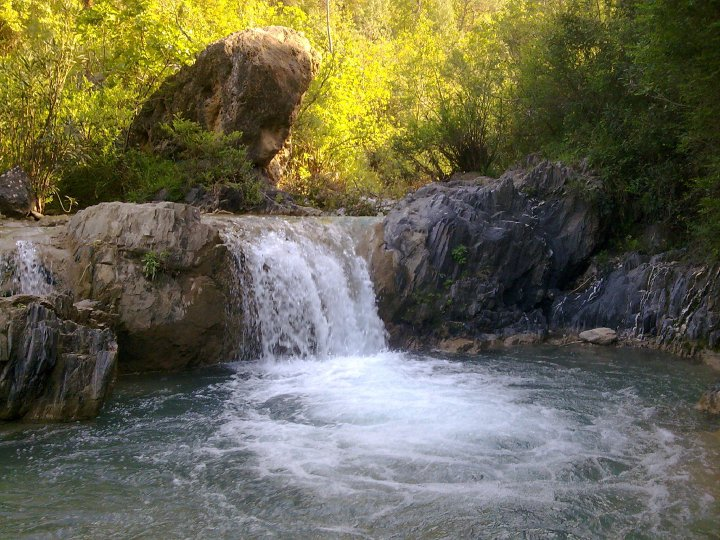
- Chréa National Park El Kawthar Mosque Aziza Palace Ettoute Square Hanafi Mosque Douirette Old Quarter Chiffa Gorge Hammam Melouane Overview of Blida

- Seal
- Nicknames: City of roses, مدينة الورود
- Location of Blida, Algeria within Blida Province
- Interactive map of Blida
- Location within Algeria
- Coordinates: 36°28′07″N 02°49′55″E
- Country: Algeria
- Province: Blida Province
- District: Blida District

Area
  - City: 72.1 km^{2} (27.8 sq mi)
- Elevation: 260 m (850 ft)

Population (2012)
  - City: 182,447
  - Density: 2,530/km^{2} (6,550/sq mi)
  - Urban: 520,000
  - Metro: 1,167,882

GDP (PPP, constant 2015 values)
  - Year: 2024
  - Total (Urban): $10.2 billion
  - Per capita: $19,500
- Time zone: UTC+1 (CET)
- Postal code: 09000
- Area code: 901
- Climate: Csa

Blida (Arabic: البليدة, romanized: al-bulaydah, Tamazight: ⵍⴻⴱⵍⵉⴷⴰ, romanized: Leblida) is a city in Algeria. It is the capital of Blida Province, and it is located about 45 km south-west of Algiers, the national capital. The name Blida, i.e. bulaydah, is a diminutive of the Arabic word belda, city.

== Geography ==
It gets its name from the classical Arabic word for "small city:" boulayda. Blida is known as the city of roses because of the large number of roses in its gardens.

Blida lies surrounded with orchards and gardens, 190 metres (620 ft) above the sea, at the base of the Tell Atlas, on the southern edge of the fertile Mitidja Plain, and the right bank of the Oued el kebir outflow from the Chiffa gorge. The abundant water of this stream provides power for large corn mills and several factories, and also supplies the town with its numerous fountains and irrigated gardens. Within Blida is Chréa National Park, one of the largest national parks in the country and part of the Atlas Mountains. Blida is surrounded by a wall of considerable extent, pierced by six gates, and is further defended by Port Mimieh, crowning a steep hill on the left bank of the river.

The nearby Chiffa gorge is a habitat of the endangered Barbary macaque, Macaca sylvanus; the habitat is one of only a few locations where populations of the primate are found.

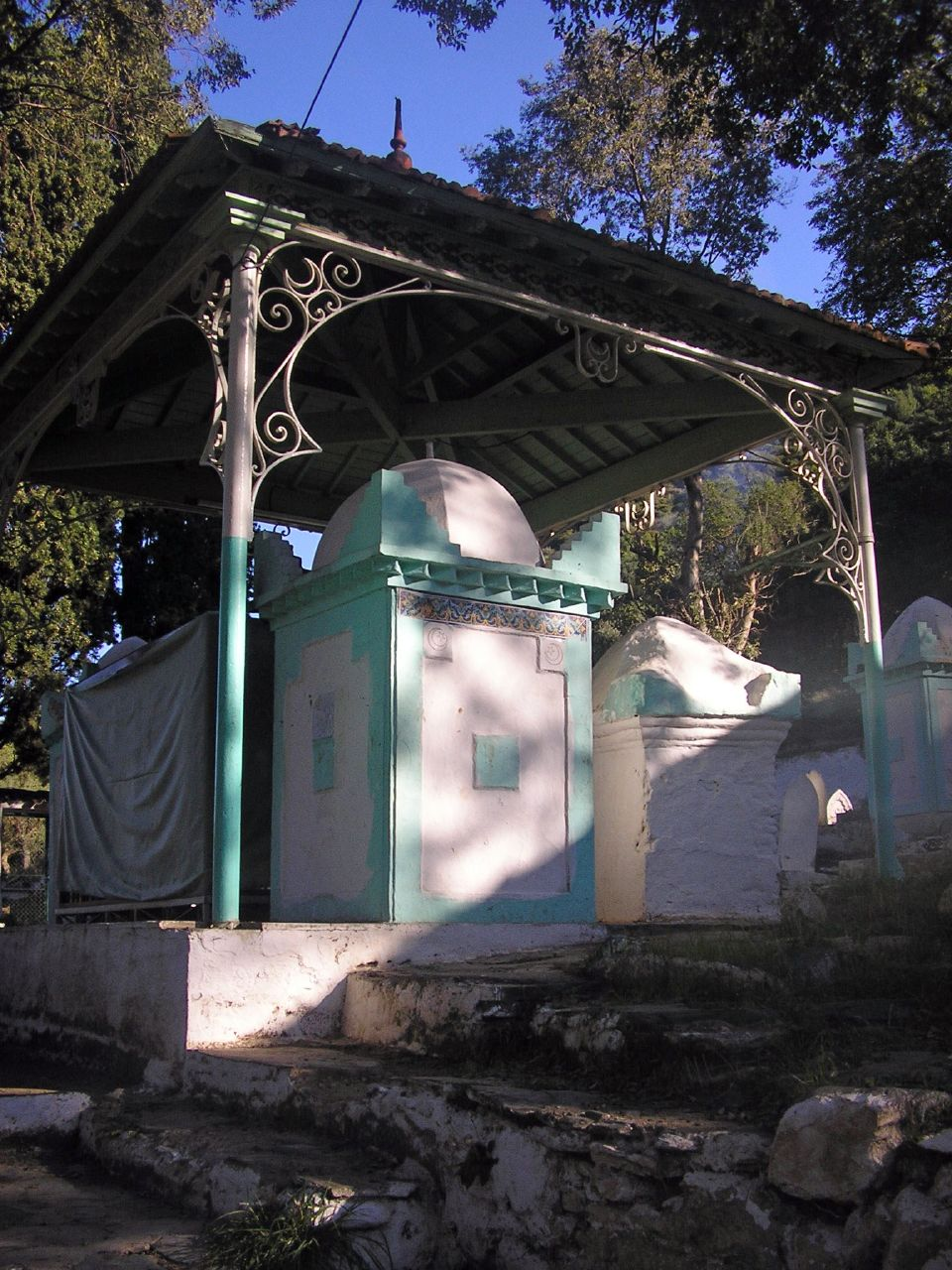
Sidi Ahmed El-Kebir Tomb.

=== Climate ===
In Blida, there is a Mediterranean climate. The Köppen-Geiger climate classification is Csa. The average annual temperature in Blida is 17.9 °C (64.2 °F). About 791 mm (31.14 in) of precipitation falls annually.

Climate data for Blida
Month	Jan	Feb	Mar	Apr	May	Jun	Jul	Aug	Sep	Oct	Nov	Dec	Year
Mean daily maximum °C (°F)	14.2 (57.6)	15.5 (59.9)	17.3 (63.1)	19.9 (67.8)	23.3 (73.9)	26.8 (80.2)	30.9 (87.6)	31.7 (89.1)	28.2 (82.8)	23.3 (73.9)	18.5 (65.3)	15.3 (59.5)	22.1 (71.7)
Mean daily minimum °C (°F)	7.0 (44.6)	7.6 (45.7)	9.3 (48.7)	11.4 (52.5)	14.3 (57.7)	17.7 (63.9)	21.4 (70.5)	22.1 (71.8)	20.0 (68.0)	15.2 (59.4)	10.9 (51.6)	8.2 (46.8)	13.8 (56.8)
Average precipitation mm (inches)	116 (4.6)	85 (3.3)	92 (3.6)	64 (2.5)	58 (2.3)	26 (1.0)	2 (0.1)	4 (0.2)	34 (1.3)	66 (2.6)	114 (4.5)	130 (5.1)	791 (31.1)
Source: climate-data.org

== History ==
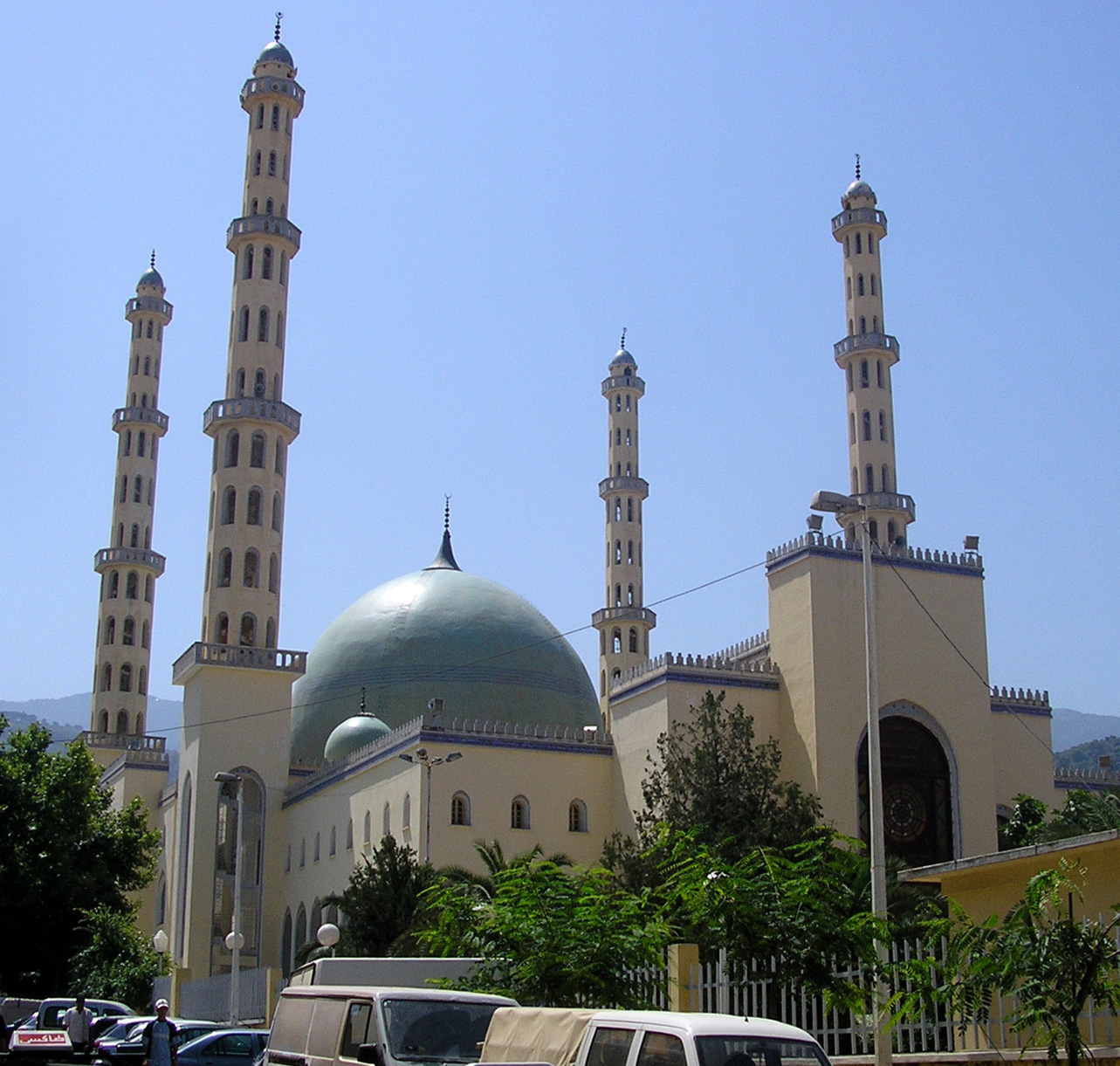
Al-kawthar Mosque, Blida

No ancient center preceded the city. It was identified with the town of Mitidja in the Middle Ages which was ruined during the Beni Ghania campaigns. The present town was founded by Moors—principally by Sidi Ahmed El-Kebir—in the 16th century.

The town was rebuilt according to a grid plan following an earthquake in March 1825 on a site about a mile distant from the ruins. It numbers among its buildings several mosques and churches, extensive barracks and a large military hospital. The principal square, the place d'Armes, is surrounded by arcaded houses and shaded by trees. The center of a fertile district, and a post on one of the main routes in the country, Blida has a flourishing trade, chiefly in oranges and flour. The orange groves contain over 50,000 trees, and in April the air for miles round is laden with the scent of the orange blossoms. In the public gardens is a group of magnificent olive trees. The products of the neighboring cork trees and cedar groves are a source of revenue to the town. Sidi Ahmed El-Kebir, Blida's founder, is buried in Sidi El-Kebir (an area named after him).

A mosque was built by order of Khair-ed-din Barbarossa, and under the Turks the town was of some importance. It was intricately rebuilt of interconnecting alleyways and streets, and was made accessible through the existing six major gates. The gates were as follows:

- Bab Er-Rahba
- Bab Ed-Zair
- Bab El-Khouikha
- Bab Es-Sebt
- Bab Ez-Zaouia
- Bab El-Kbour
- Bab El-Kseb

Today those gates no longer exist, but their names are still in use by people in Blida as reference points to locate streets, places, schools and businesses.

In 1839, French troops occupied the city and built a military base there. They also built an airbase, a communications center, and a military hospital. During the occupation, Blida was known mainly for its rich farmlands on the Mitidja Plain. Many aspects of life there were racially segregated, including Muslims being compartmentalized into a crowded ghetto and boarding schools enforcing racially segregated dormitories. This occupation lasted until Algeria won its independence from France in the Algerian War.

In 1867, another earthquake damaged Blida.

Blida Province is home to a number of Berber-speaking tribes &towns. The Berbers of Blida are known as Djebailia and have been in the plains of Blida/Matija for thousands of years according to historians such as Ibn khaldoun. The tribes are Beni Salah (Ith salah), Beni Misrah (Ith Misra), Ghalia and many more. They speak Taqbaylit the language of the Kabyle which is the Berber language of blida close to the Kabyle varieties spoken east of Algiers Province, It is 95% identical and has traditionally been seen as an intermediate between Kabyle and the Chenoua language native to the north-eastern part of the country.

== Notable locations ==
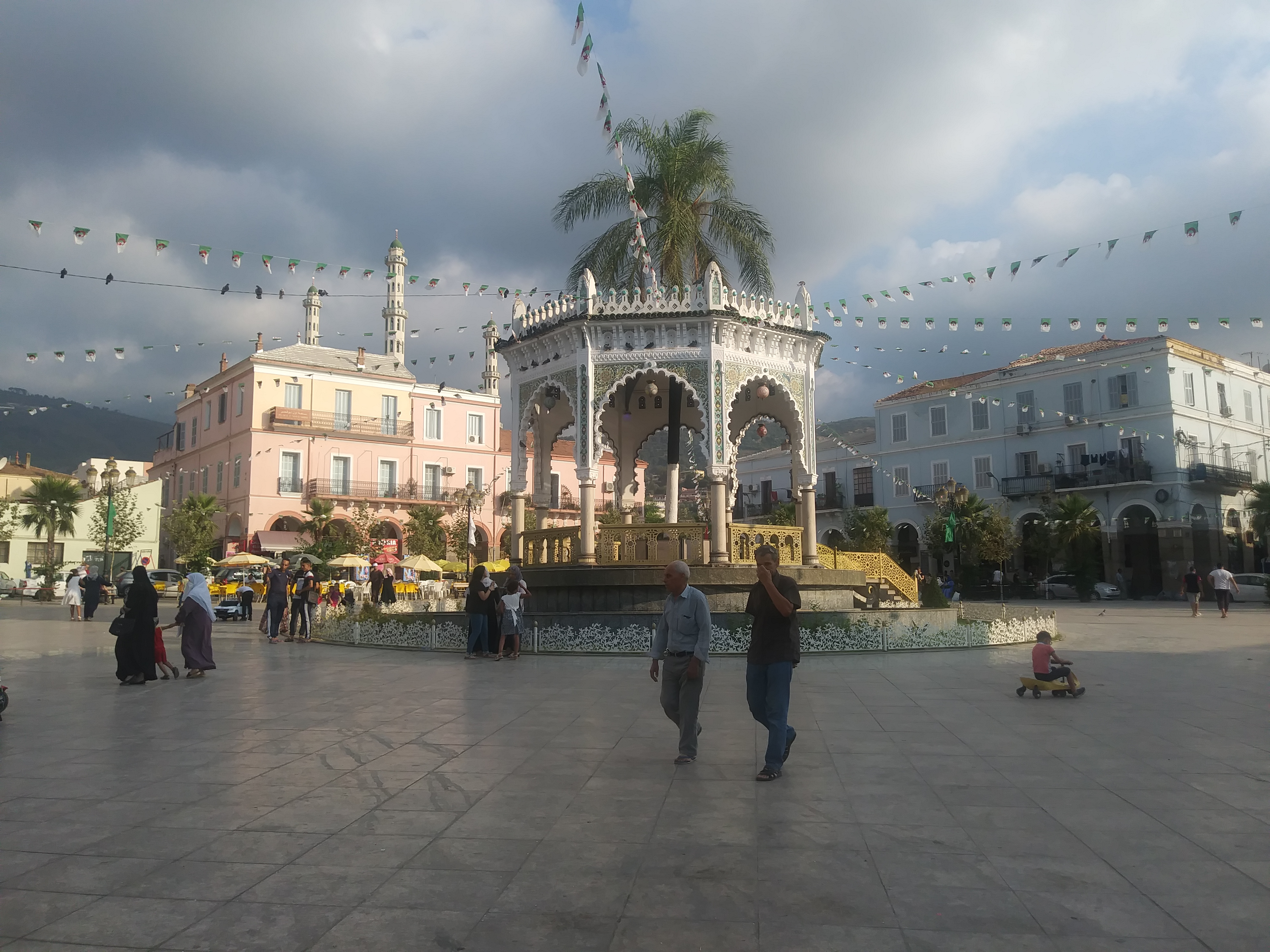
Gazebo at Place Toute

- Stade Mustapha Tchaker in Blida is the current exclusive home stadium for the Algeria national football team. This has been the case since it was opened in 2002, Algeria have however also played many of their home games away from Tchaker throughout their history, both in friendly matches and for competitive tournaments.
- Al-Kawthar Mosque is located in the center of the city at the Bin Merah Square, known as the famous square of the Toot in Blida. The mosque is distinguished by its space as it attracts more than 12 thousand worshipers on religious occasions.
- Place Toute is located in the center of Blida located near Bab Es-Sebt, Al-Kawthar Mosque, and the old market. Tourists and locals can enjoy the many cafes, pastry shops, ice cream shops, and other restaurants while their children play in the plaza.

== Notable people ==
- Mhamed Yazid (1923–2003) — politician
- Mahfoud Nahnah (1942–2003) — politician
- Mohamed Baba Ameur (1893–1976) — theologian
- Mohamed Bouslimani (1941–1993) — politician
- Elissa Rhaïs — novelist
- Edouard Nieuport (1875–1911) — aviation pioneer and manufacturer
- Salah Aougrout — comedian
- Farid Khodja — singer
- Rabah Driassa — singer & painter
- Baya — artist
- Souhila Bel Bahar — painter
- Mohamed Bourouissa – artist
- Frantz Fanon — psychiatrist and writer
- Dahmane Ben Achour — singer
- Ahmed Zahzah — footballer
