= Algiers suburban rail network =

Commuter rail network in Algiers, Algeria

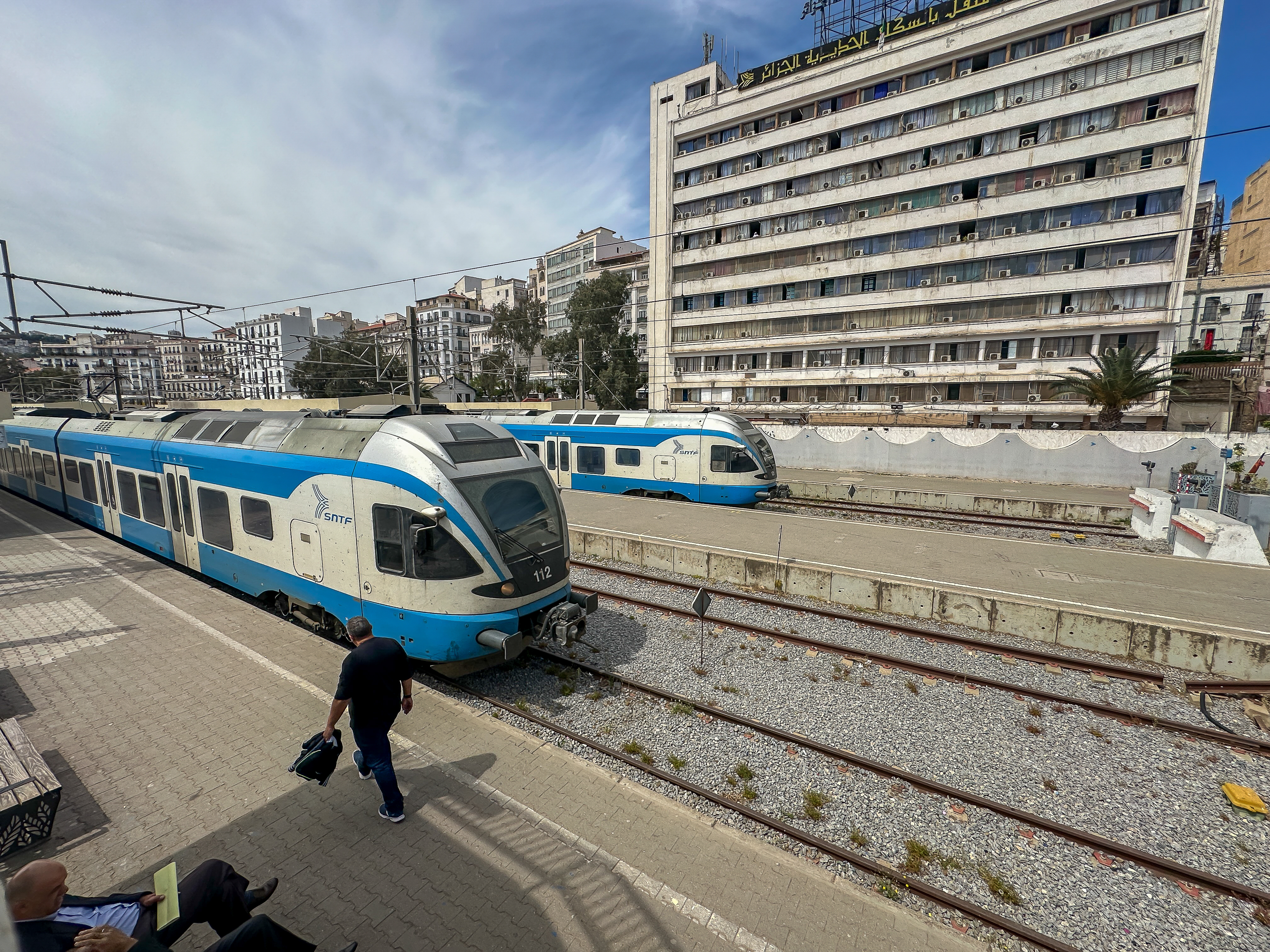
- Commuter trains at Agha station, May 2025

Overview
- Native name: شبكة السكك الحديدية لضواحي الجزائر
- Owner: SNTF (Société Nationale des Transports Ferroviaires)
- Area served: Algiers, Blida, Boumerdès, and Tizi Ouzou, Algeria
- Transit type: Commuter rail
- Number of lines: 7
- Number of stations: 44
- Daily ridership: ~91,000
- Annual ridership: 32.6 million (2018)
- Website: https://www.sntf.dz/

Operation
- Operator: SNTF (Société Nationale des Transports Ferroviaires)

Technical
- System length: 212 kilometres (132 mi)
- Electrification: 25 kV 50 Hz AC overhead line
System map
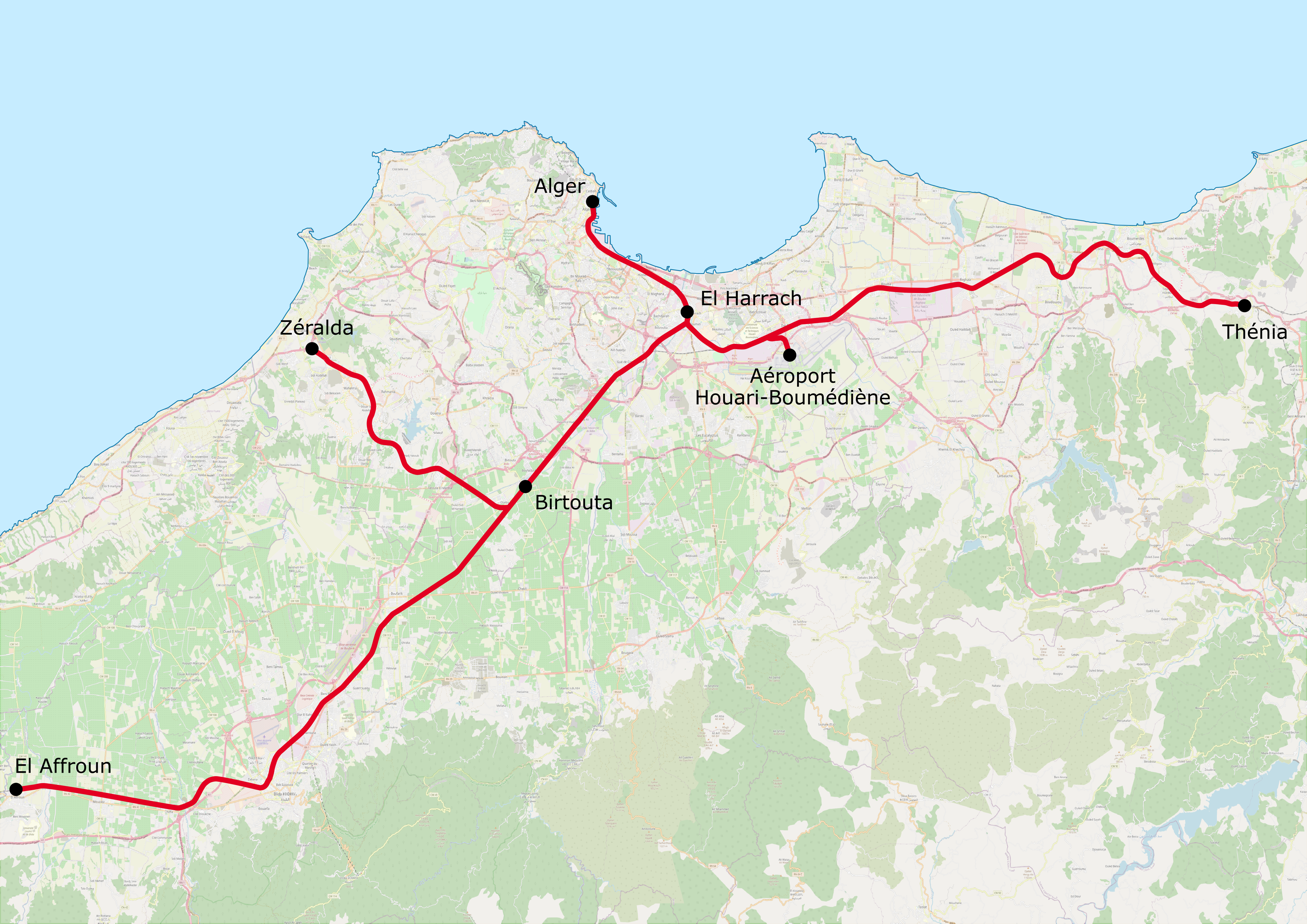

The Algiers suburban rail network (French: Réseau ferré de la banlieue d'Alger; Arabic: شبكة السكك الحديدية لضواحي الجزائر) is a commuter rail network serving the region of Algiers, the capital and largest city of Algeria. Operated by the Société Nationale des Transports Ferroviaires (SNTF), Algeria's national railway company, the network consists of seven lines and 212 kilometres (132 mi) of track serving 44 stations. The network serves a total of four provinces: Algiers, Blida, Boumerdès, and Tizi Ouzou, and carried 32.6 million passengers in 2018.

== History ==
=== Origins ===
The origins of today's suburban network date back to the beginning of rail transport in Algeria, with the opening of the Algiers-Blida line (now part of the larger Algiers-Oran mainline) in 1862 marking the first section of the current network. Later, in 1879, the first section of the Algiers-Skikda mainline opened, thus forming the second part of the commuter network. Suburban services on both of these lines remained mostly unchanged throughout their history, with trains running from Algiers station to El Affroun on the Algiers-Oran line, and to Thénia on the Algiers-Skikda line.

=== 2000s: Modernization ===
Starting in the early 2000s, the SNTF launched a renewal program for the suburban network in order to bring it up to modern standards. This included the replacement of track on much of the network, as well as electrification and the delivery of new rolling stock.

In January 2004, tenders were launched for the electrification of the network, and the contract for the electrification was officially awarded to a consortium of Alstom, Infrarail, and Baticim in June 2004. Later, in 2005, tenders were also launched for the supply of 64 electric multiple-units for operation on the network, the winner of the contract being announced as Stadler Rail in March 2006.

The first train of the new fleet was rolled out in January 2008, and arrived in Algiers on May 31, 2008. In November 2008, the electrification of the Algiers-Thénia line was completed, and electrification works on the Algiers-El Affroun line were later also completed in April 2009, after which test running on the network began.

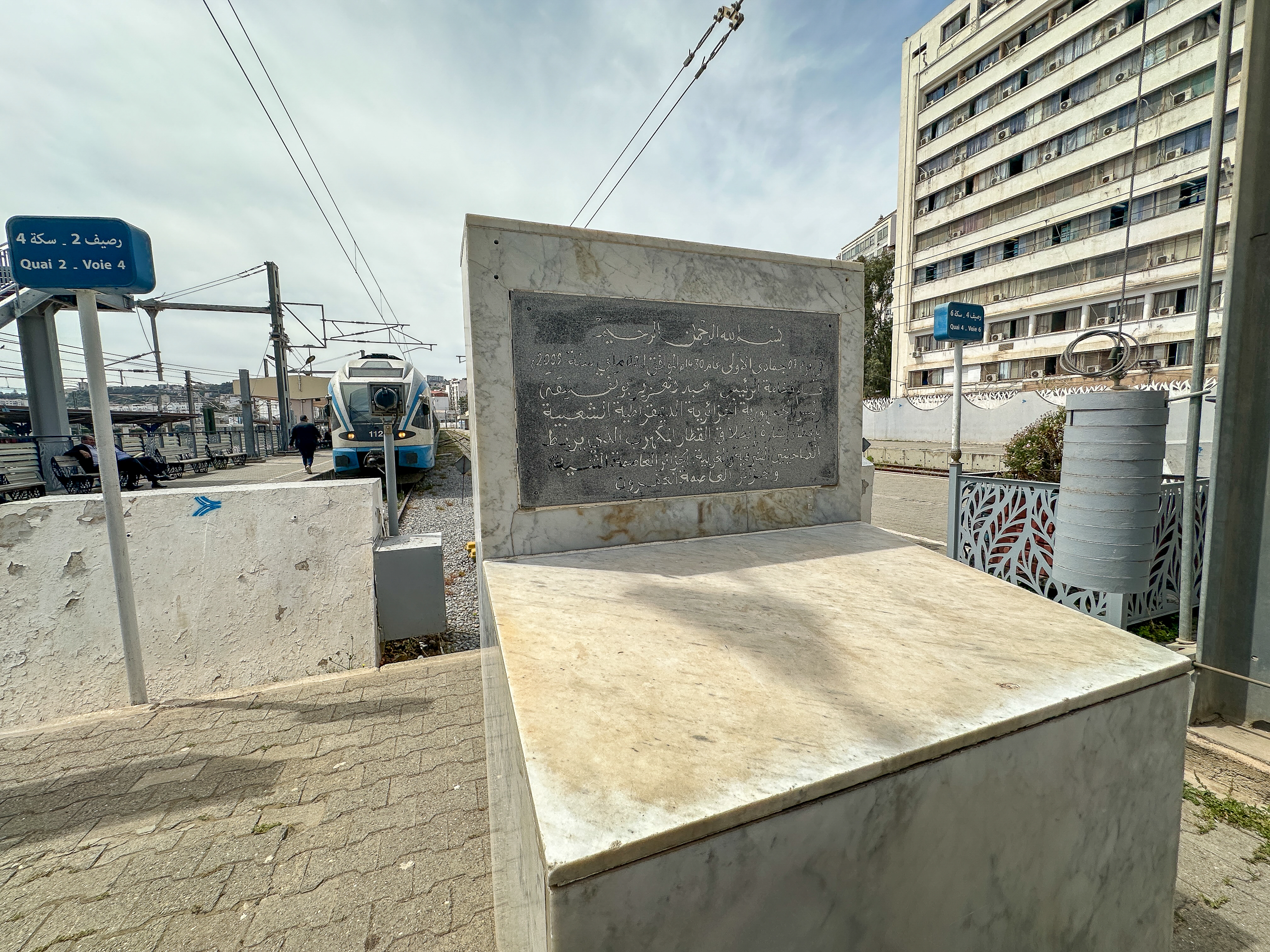
Plaque at Agha station commemorating the inauguration of electrified services.

Electric services were officially inaugurated on both lines of the network on May 2, 2009, by then-president Abdelaziz Bouteflika, with regular services beginning the next day.

=== 2010s-2020s: Expansion ===
By the turn of the 2010s, the existing rail network had already been fully renewed, and so the SNTF began to expand the network to serve new areas of the Algerian capital.

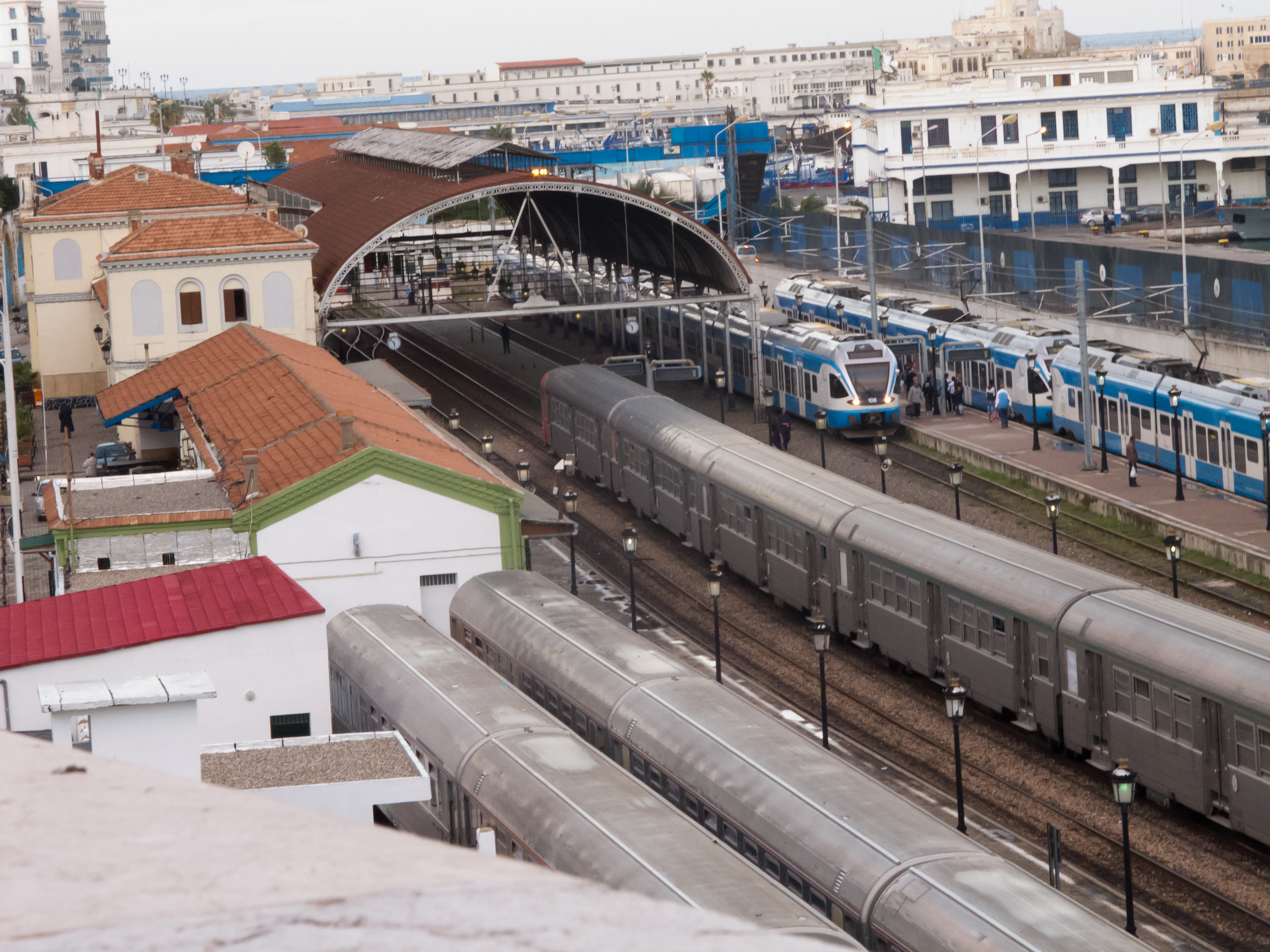
Diesel and electric commuter trains at Algiers station in October 2010.

Although electric services were inaugurated in 2009, diesel-hauled suburban trains were still running while the fleet of EMUs was still being delivered. By the end of 2010, however, the delivery of all 64 EMUs was completed. The last diesel locomotive-hauled suburban train, a Thénia-Algiers service, ran on December 30, 2010.

The first of the new lines was the Birtouta-Zéralda line, which branches off of the Algiers-El Affroun line to serve the northwestern districts of Algiers. Construction on the line began in September 2011, and the line opened on November 1, 2016, with regular services beginning later on December 11, 2016.

In 2008, a project to renew the Thénia-Tizi Ouzou line was started. The line, which had existed since 1886, was operated primarily as a regional railway, however the renovation works integrated the line into the electrified commuter rail system. Additionally, a 14 km (8.7 mi) extension of the line to Oued Aïssi was also included with the project. The first test runs on the newly renovated line occurred on April 3, 2017, and full service began on April 19, 2017, from Thénia to Tizi Ouzou, with the extension to Oued Aïssi later opening to passenger service on June 9, 2017.

Construction of the network's newest branch, running from Bab Ezzouar to Houari Boumédiène International Airport, began in December 2012. The line opened on April 29, 2019.

On July 6, 2024, service began on the Oued Smar-Gué de Constantine line, enabling trains to run directly from both sides of the network and bypassing the core section in central Algiers. Upon the introduction of the service, trains ran from Réghaïa to both Blida and Zéralda; however in October 2024, trains were reconfigured to run from Thénia to El Affroun and Zéralda.

== Network ==
=== Overview ===
As of 2025, the commuter rail network is composed of seven lines and 212 kilometres (132 mi) of track, serving 44 stations. Most lines of the network start from either Algiers or Agha in central Algiers and radiate outwards, with a 10.5 km (6.5 mi) long central section from Agha to El Harrach forming the core section of the network. From El Harrach, the two main lines of the network run to El Affroun in the southwest and Thénia in the east, with branches, such as the Zéralda or Airport lines, running off of them.

Although most lines of the network run on the core section, there are three exceptions to this rule: Thénia-Oued Aïssi trains on the Agha/Thénia-Oued Aïssi line, and trains running via the Oued Smar-Gué de Constantine line.

The network in 2025.

=== Lines ===
==== Algiers-El Affroun line ====
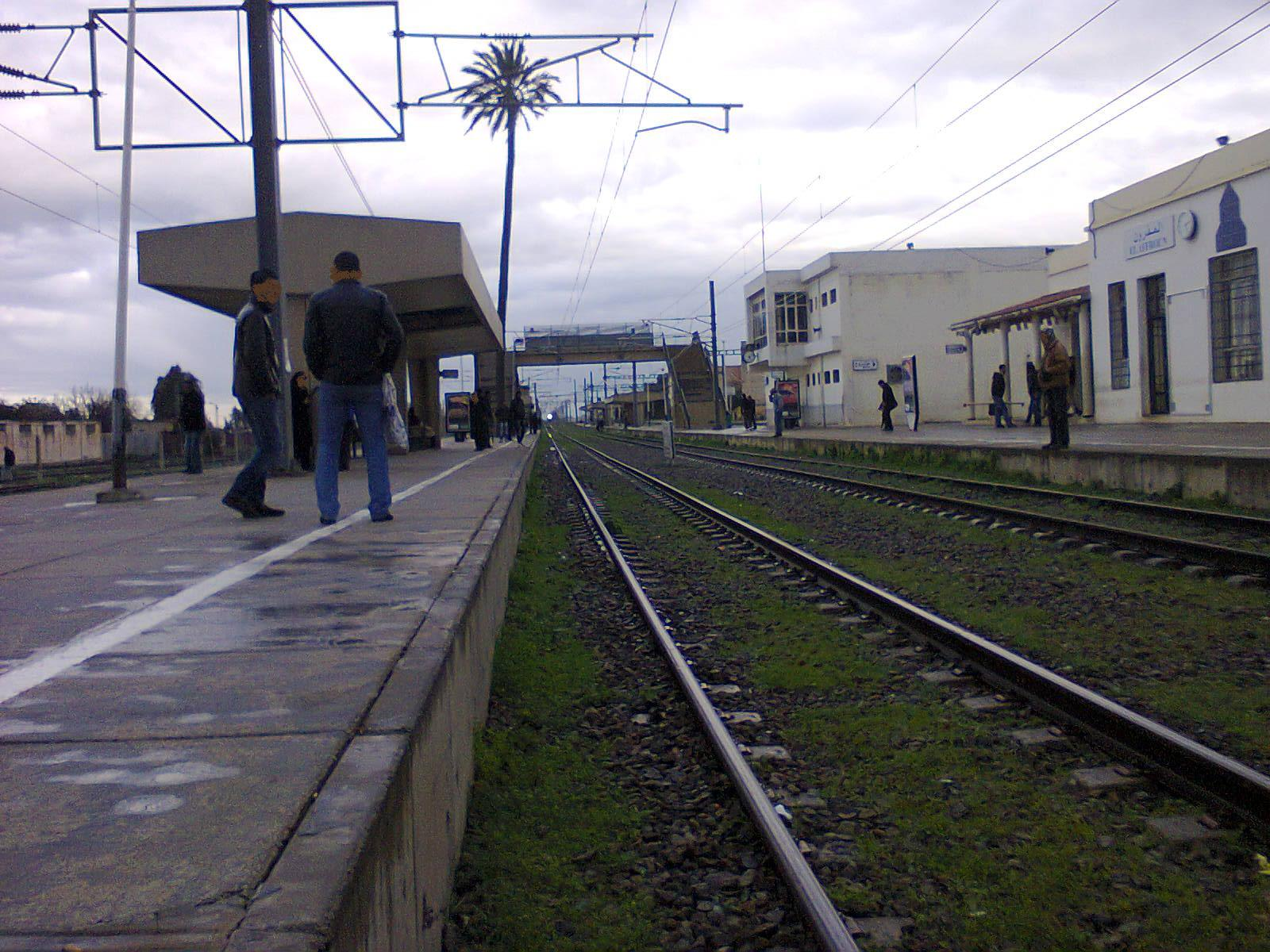
El Affroun station, the terminus of the Algiers-El Affroun line, in 2013.

The Algiers-El Affroun line, also known as Algiers West or the Western Suburban (French: Banlieue Ouest), is the oldest line of the network. It runs from Algiers station in the city center southwest to El Affroun, in the province of Blida, over a distance of 68 kilometres (42 mi), sharing track with the Algiers-Oran mainline throughout its entire route.

	Stations	Commune served	Connections
■	Alger	Alger-Centre
●	Agha	Sidi M'Hamed
●	Les Ateliers	Belouizdad
●	Hussein Dey	Hussein Dey
●	Caroubier	Hussein Dey
●	El Harrach	El Harrach
●	Gué de Constantine	Djasr Kasentina
●	Aïn Naâdja	Djasr Kasentina	(under construction)
●	Baba Ali	Saoula
●	Birtouta	Ouled Chebel, Birtouta
●	Boufarik	Boufarik
●	Beni Mered	Beni Mered
●	Blida	Blida
●	Chiffa	Chiffa
●	Mouzaia	Mouzaia
■	El Affroun	El Affroun

==== Algiers-Thénia line ====
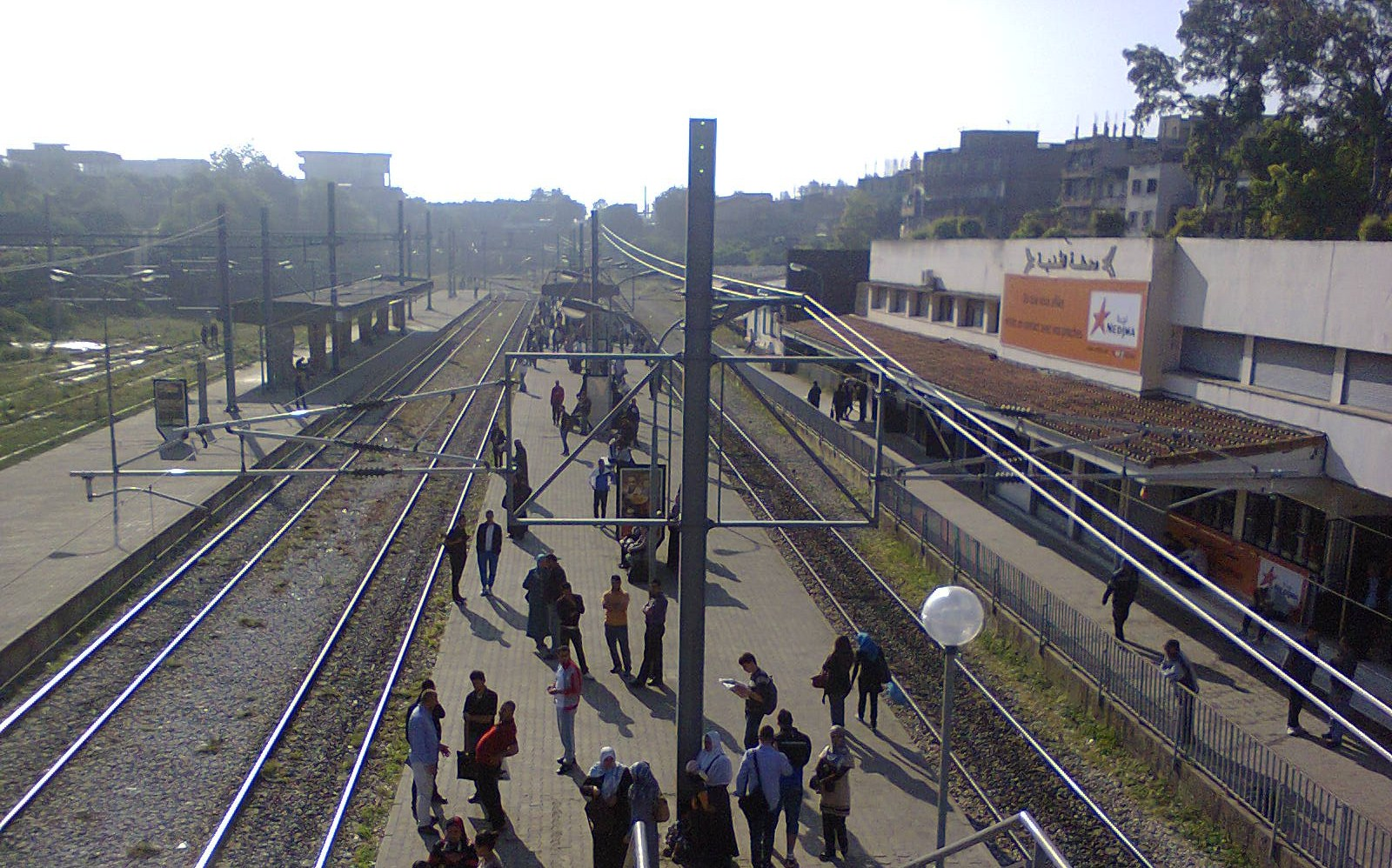
Thénia station, the terminus of the Algiers-Thénia line, in 2013.

The Algiers-Thénia line, also known as Algiers East or Eastern Suburban (French: Banlieue Est), runs from Algiers main station to Thénia, in the province of Boumerdès on an east–west axis over 54 kilometres (34 mi) of track. Like the Algiers-El Affroun line, the Algiers-Thénia line runs entirely on existing infrastructure, in this case the Algiers-Skikda mainline.

	Stations	Commune served	Connections
■	Alger	Alger-Centre
●	Agha	Sidi M'Hamed
●	Les Ateliers	Belouizdad
●	Hussein Dey	Hussein Dey
●	Caroubier	Hussein Dey
●	El Harrach	El Harrach
●	Oued Smar	Oued Smar
●	Bab Ezzouar	Bab Ezzouar
●	Dar El Beïda	Dar El Beïda
●	Rouïba	Rouïba
●	Rouïba ZI	Rouïba
●	Réghaïa ZI	Réghaïa
●	Réghaïa	Réghaïa
●	Boudouaou	Boudouaou
●	Corso	Corso
●	Boumerdès	Boumerdès
●	Tidjelabine	Tidjelabine
■	Thénia	Thénia

==== Agha-Zéralda line ====
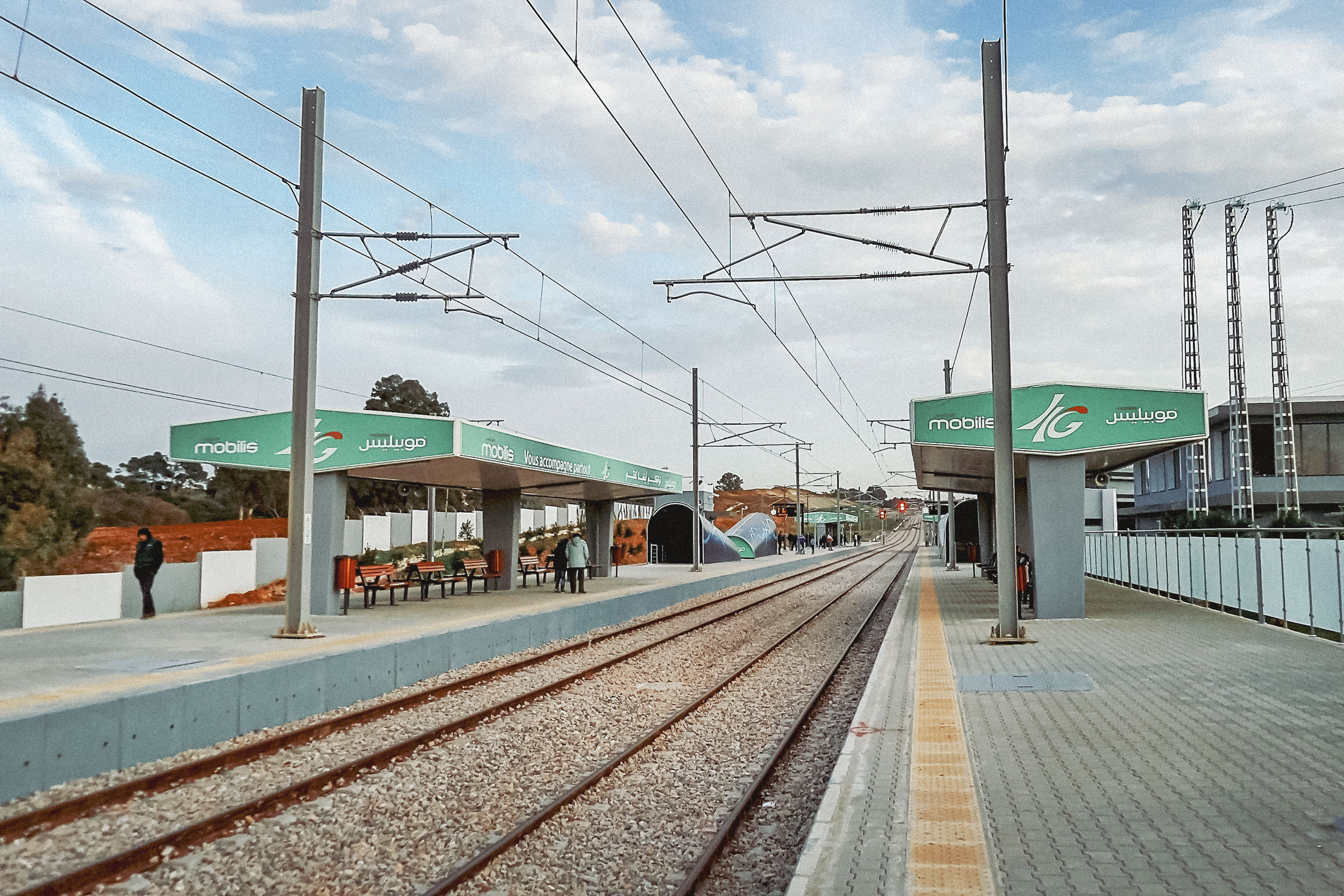
Zéralda station, the terminus of the Agha-Zéralda line, in 2016.

The Agha-Zéralda line is a “U”-shaped line, which runs on Algiers-El Affroun line trackage from Agha to Birtouta, where it subsequently branches off of the line and runs north to Zéralda via the new town of Sidi Abdellah, with the entirety of the line being located within the boundaries of the province of Algiers. The line is 35 kilometres (22 mi) long, and was the first line in Algiers to be built and used exclusively for suburban rail traffic. Construction on the line started in September 2011, and the line was inaugurated on November 1, 2016, with passenger services starting on December 11, 2016.

	Stations	Commune served	Connections
■	Agha	Sidi M'Hamed
●	Les Ateliers	Belouizdad
●	Hussein Dey	Hussein Dey
●	Caroubier	Hussein Dey
●	El Harrach	El Harrach
●	Gué de Constantine	Djasr Kasentina
●	Aïn Naâdja	Djasr Kasentina	(under construction)
●	Baba Ali	Saoula
●	Birtouta	Ouled Chebel, Birtouta
●	Tessala El Merdja	Douera
●	Sidi Abdellah	Mahelma
●	Université	Mahelma
■	Zéralda	Zéralda

==== Agha/Thénia-Oued Aïssi line ====
Kef Naâdja station in 2026.

The Agha/Thénia-Oued Aïssi line is the longest line of the network, running a total distance of 118 kilometres (73 mi) on an east–west route, connecting the provinces of Algiers, Boumerdès, and Tizi Ouzou. The line has its origins in the Thénia-Tizi Ouzou railway, which first opened in 1886, and was later upgraded and integrated into the suburban rail network. The line's renovated section opened on April 19, 2017, while the extension to Oued Aïssi opened to passenger service on June 9, 2017.

Two types of trains run on the line: express services from Agha to Oued Aïssi, which skip certain stations on the Algiers-Thénia line, and local services running from Thénia to Oued Aïssi.

	Stations	Commune served	Connections
●	Agha	Sidi M'Hamed
●	El Harrach	El Harrach
●	Dar El Beïda	Dar El Beïda
●	Rouïba	Rouïba
●	Réghaïa	Réghaïa
●	Boumerdès	Boumerdès
■	Thénia	Thénia
●	Si Mustapha	Si Mustapha
●	Isser	Isser
●	Bordj Menaïel	Bordj Menaïel
●	Naciria	Naciria
●	Tadmaït	Tadmaït
●	Draâ Ben Khedda	Draâ Ben Khedda
●	Boukhalfa	Tizi Ouzou
●	Tizi Ouzou	Tizi Ouzou
●	Kef Naâdja	Tizi Ouzou
●	Oued Aïssi - Université	Tizi Ouzou
■	Oued Aïssi	Tizi Ouzou

==== Agha-Houari Boumédiène Airport line ====
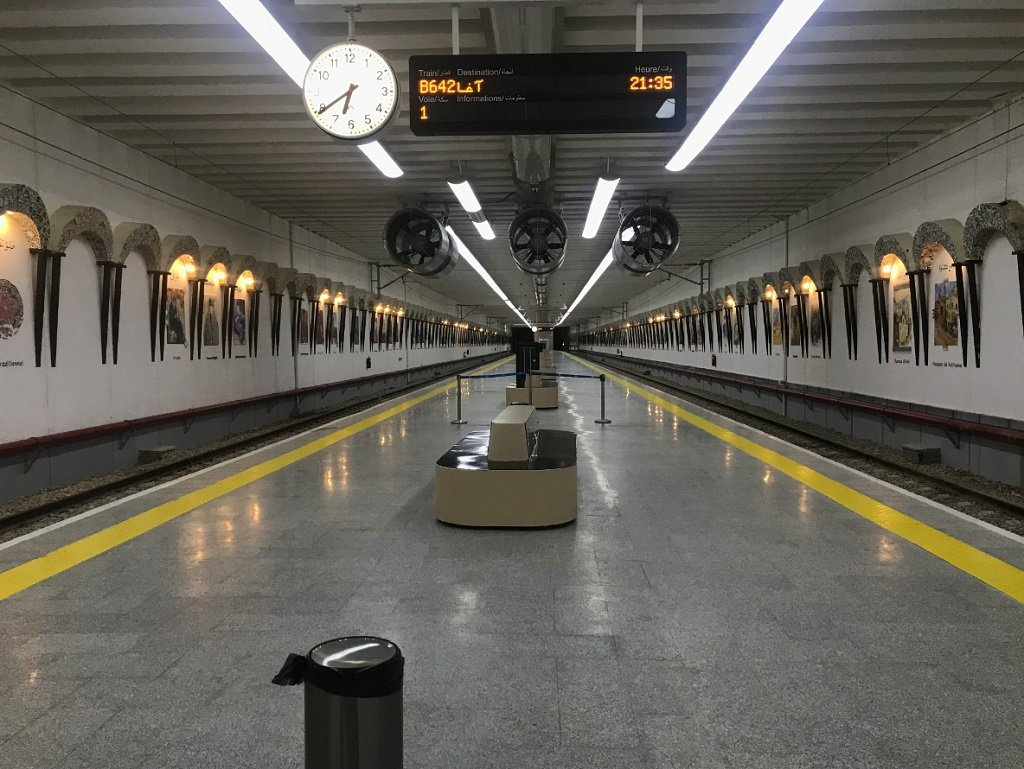
Houari Boumédiène Airport station, the terminus of the Agha-Airport line, in 2021.

The Agha-Houari Boumédiène Airport line is the shortest line of the network, running for a distance of around 19 kilometres (12 mi) from Agha station to Algiers-Houari Boumédiène International Airport. Construction on the line started in December 2012, and it later opened on April 29, 2019. The line offers express service only, and runs on an east–west alignment. It also includes the network's only underground station, that being the terminus at the airport.

	Stations	Commune served	Connections
■	Agha	Sidi M'Hamed
●	El Harrach	El Harrach
●	Bab Ezzouar	Bab Ezzouar
■	Houari Boumédiène Airport	Dar El Beïda	(under construction)

==== Thénia-El Affroun line ====
The Thénia-El Affroun line is one of the longest lines of the network, running for a total distance of around 105 kilometres (65 mi) on an east–west alignment, connecting the provinces of Blida, Algiers, and Boumerdès. The line is one of only two lines to use the Oued Smar-Gué de Constantine line, which bypasses the core section in Algiers in order to provide direct service between both sides of the network. Upon entering service on July 6, 2024, trains on the line originally ran from Blida to Réghaïa. However, in October 2024, a timetable change extended trains running on the line to run from Thénia to El Affroun, thus leading to the current line.

	Stations	Commune served	Connections
■	Thénia	Thénia
●	Tidjelabine	Tidjelabine
●	Boumerdès	Boumerdès
●	Corso	Corso
●	Boudouaou	Boudouaou
●	Réghaïa	Réghaïa
●	Réghaïa ZI	Réghaïa
●	Rouïba ZI	Rouïba
●	Rouïba	Rouïba
●	Dar El Beïda	Dar El Beïda
●	Bab Ezzouar	Bab Ezzouar
●	Oued Smar	Oued Smar
●	Gué de Constantine	Djasr Kasentina
●	Aïn Naâdja	Djasr Kasentina	(under construction)
●	Baba Ali	Saoula
●	Birtouta	Ouled Chebel, Birtouta
●	Boufarik	Boufarik
●	Beni Mered	Beni Mered
●	Blida	Blida
●	Chiffa	Chiffa
●	Mouzaia	Mouzaia
■	El Affroun	El Affroun

==== Thénia-Zéralda line ====
Like the Thénia-El Affroun line, the Thénia-Zéralda line uses the Oued Smar-Gué de Constantine line to bypass the core section of the network in central Algiers and run directly from one end of the network to another. However, instead of running on Algiers-El Affroun line trackage, the line instead turns north onto the Birtouta-Zéralda line. The line started operation on July 6, 2024, originally running from Réghaïa to Zéralda, and was extended to Thénia in October 2024.

	Stations	Commune served	Connections
■	Thénia	Thénia
●	Tidjelabine	Tidjelabine
●	Boumerdès	Boumerdès
●	Corso	Corso
●	Boudouaou	Boudouaou
●	Réghaïa	Réghaïa
●	Réghaïa ZI	Réghaïa
●	Rouïba ZI	Rouïba
●	Rouïba	Rouïba
●	Dar El Beïda	Dar El Beïda
●	Bab Ezzouar	Bab Ezzouar
●	Oued Smar	Oued Smar
●	Gué de Constantine	Djasr Kasentina
●	Aïn Naâdja	Djasr Kasentina	(under construction)
●	Baba Ali	Saoula
●	Birtouta	Ouled Chebel, Birtouta
●	Tessala El Merdja	Douera
●	Sidi Abdellah	Mahelma
●	Université	Mahelma
■	Zéralda	Zéralda

== Rolling stock ==
=== Current ===
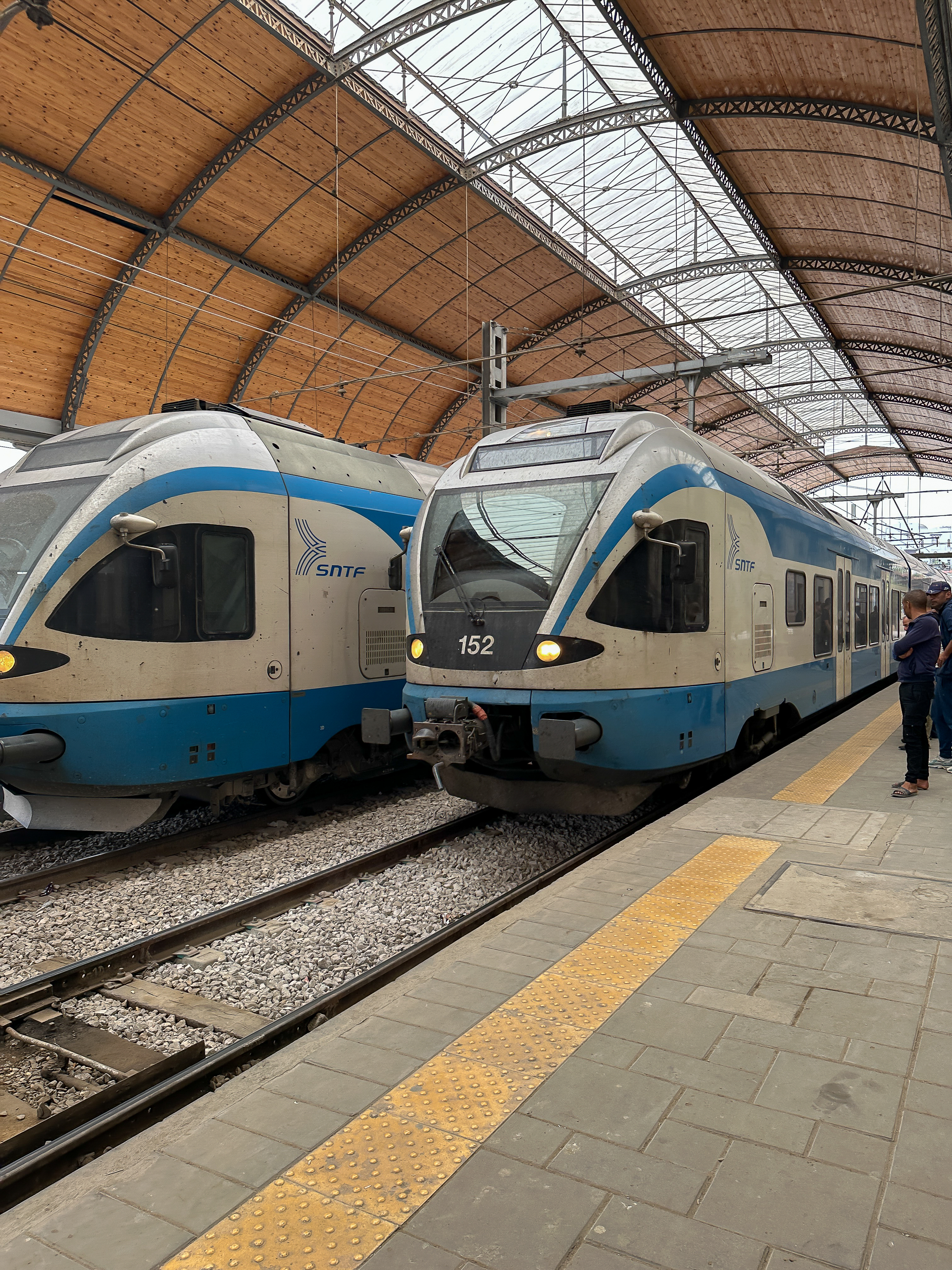
Two Class 541 trains at Algiers station, May 2025

As of 2025, there is only one type of rolling stock used on the network.

As part of the network's upgrading and electrification in the 2000s, the SNTF launched a tender for the supply of 64 electric multiple units for operation on the network in 2005. The winner of the tender was announced as the Swiss company Stadler Rail in March 2006, and delivery began in early 2008. Delivery lasted until 2010.

Based on Stadler's FLIRT design, the trains consist of four cars, with eight doors per side. They operate on the network's 25 kV 50 Hz AC overhead electrification system, and have a maximum capacity of 786 standing and 144 seated passengers. Up to four trainsets may be coupled together for a total capacity of around 3,700 passengers. The trains are classed by the SNTF as the Class 541, with series numbers 541–101 to 541-164.

=== Former ===
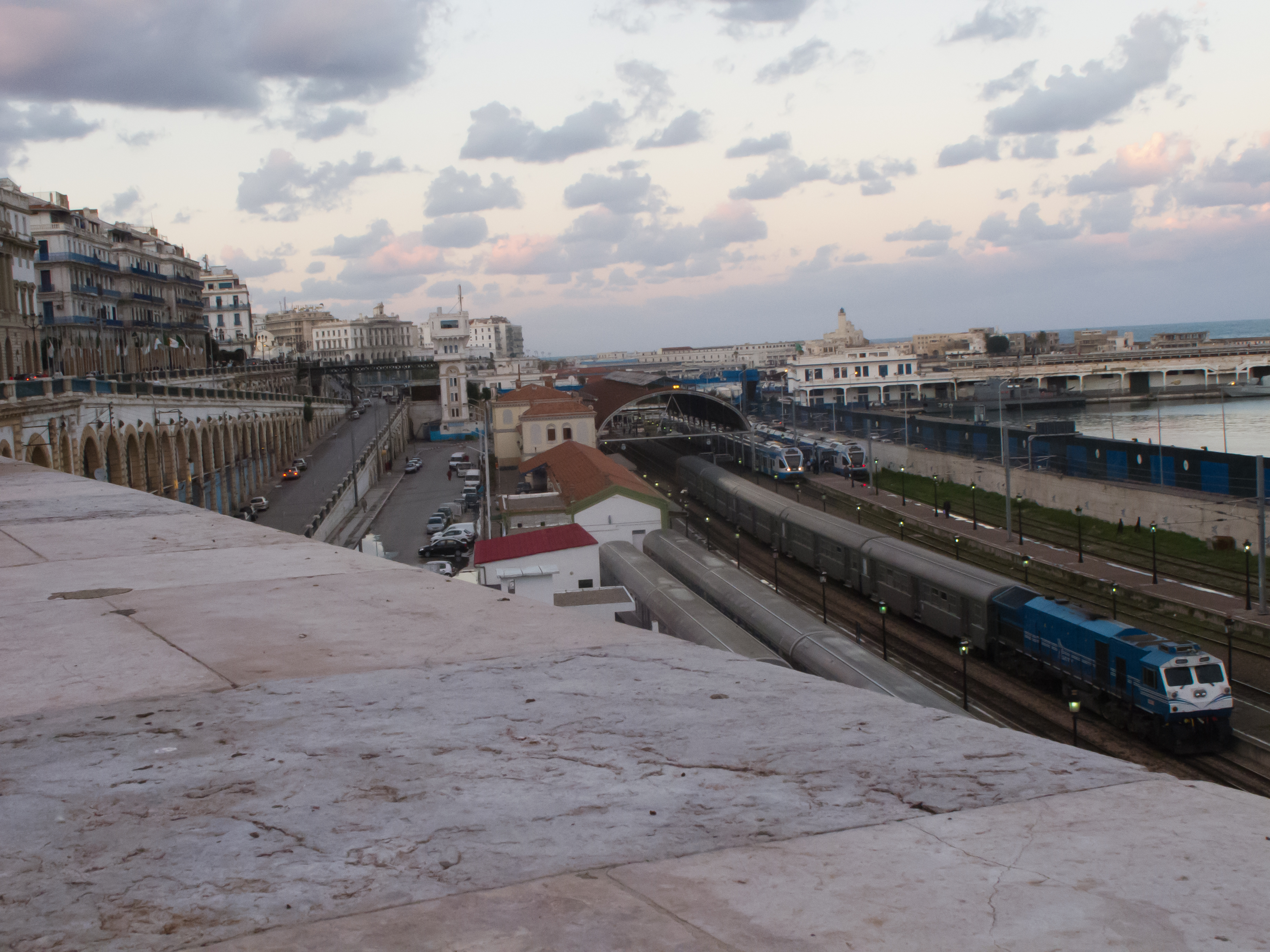
A diesel-hauled commuter train leaving Algiers station in October 2010.

Before the introduction of electric multiple-units on the network, passenger carriages hauled by diesel locomotives were used for suburban services.

In the early 1980s, the French manufacturer Francorail built several commuter carriages to be hauled by diesel locomotives for operation on the then-unelectrified network. These coaches included cab cars, which allowed trains to be driven from behind and thus resulted in shorter turnaround times. The locomotives hauling commuter trains, meanwhile, were generally borrowed from the mainline, regional, and freight operations of the SNTF, as there were no locomotives specially allocated for operation on the commuter network.

Locomotive-hauled trains started to be retired with the introduction of electric multiple-units in 2009, and the last locomotive-hauled service on the network, a Thénia-Algiers train, ran on December 30, 2010. Since their displacement in Algiers, most suburban coaches have been transferred to other cities in Algeria with diesel commuter rail, namely Oran, Constantine, and Annaba.

== Gallery ==
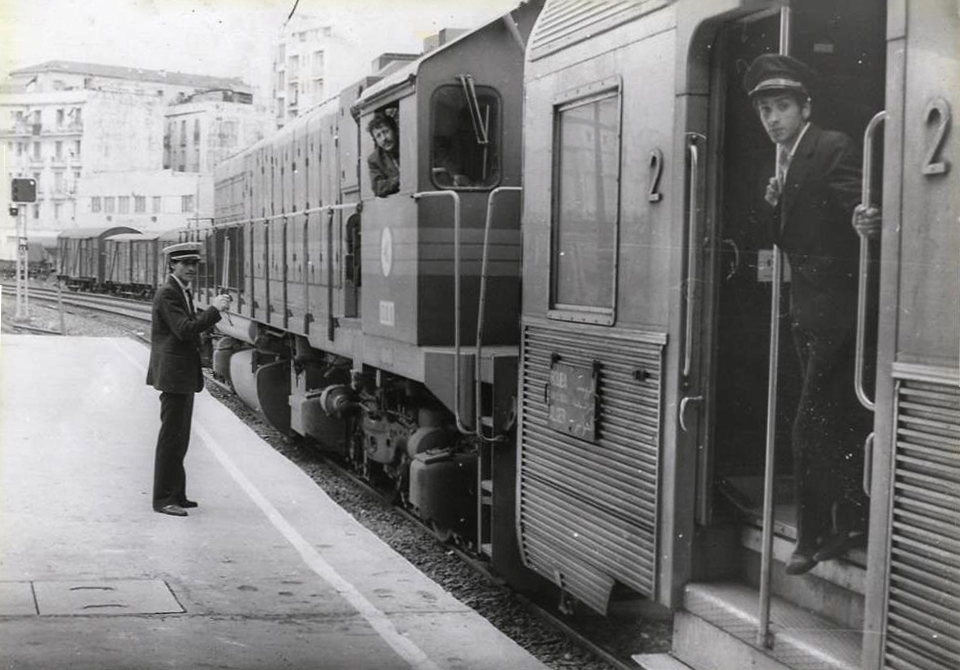
A commuter train at Agha station in 1983.

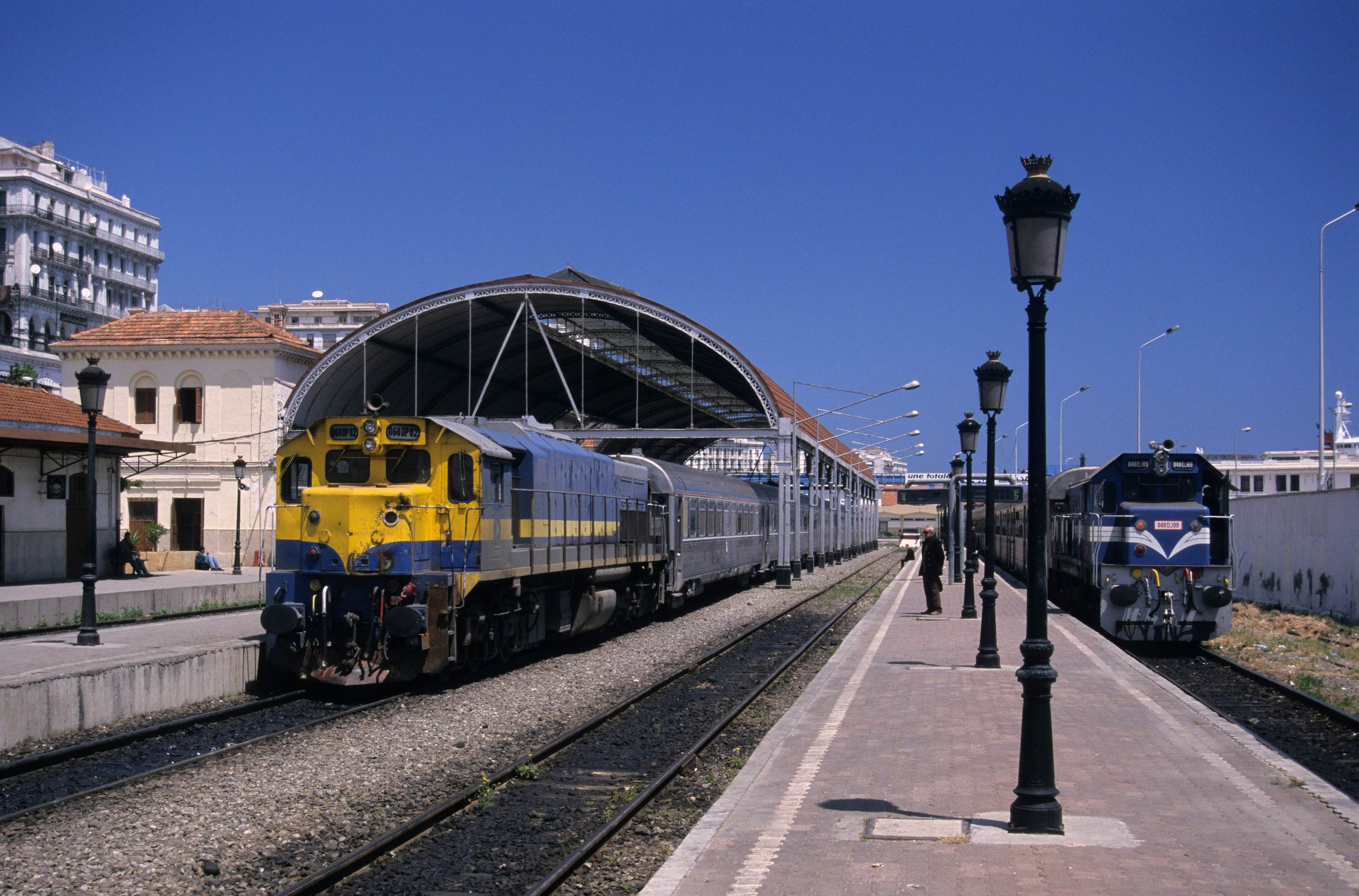
Algiers station in 2001.

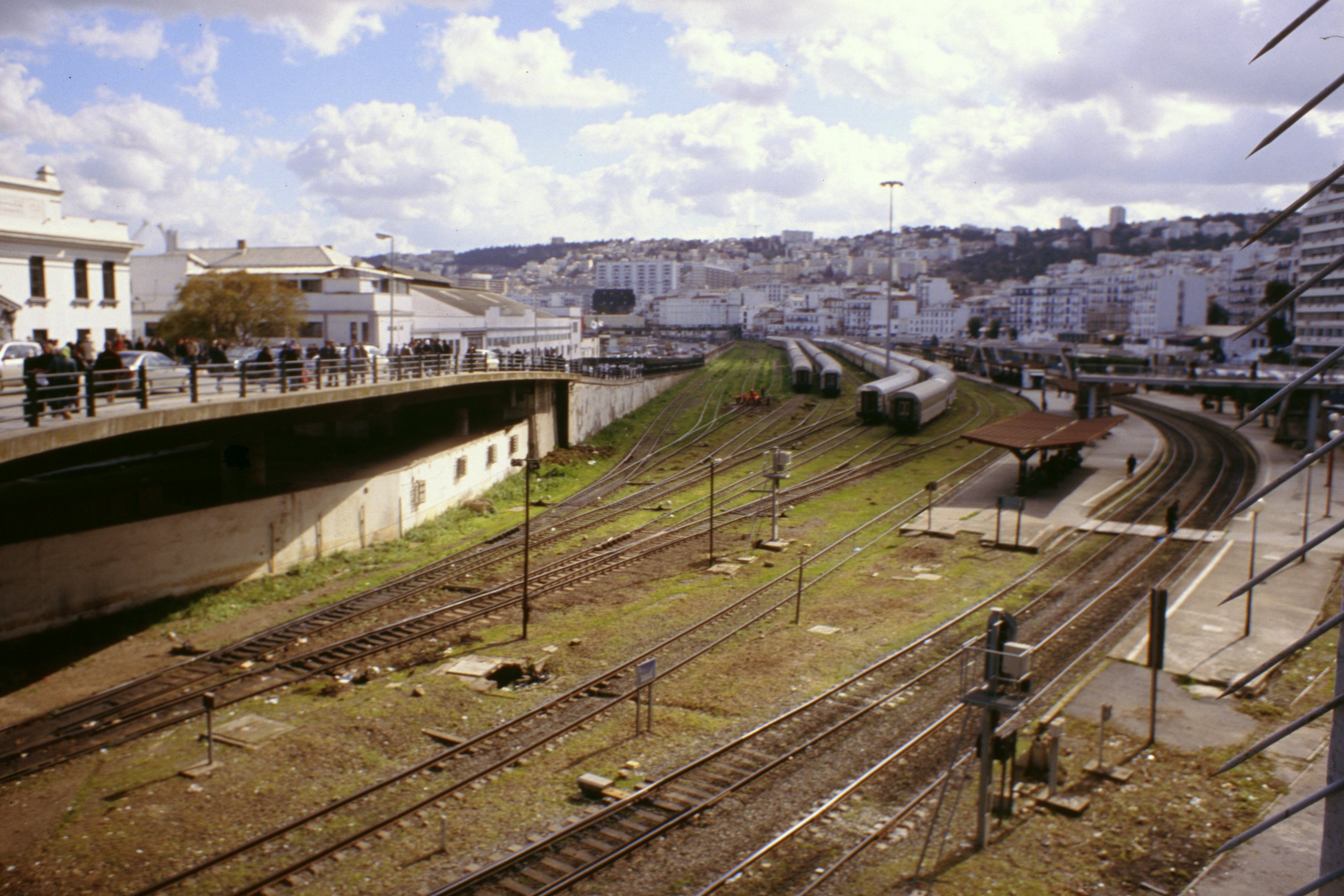
Agha station in 2006.

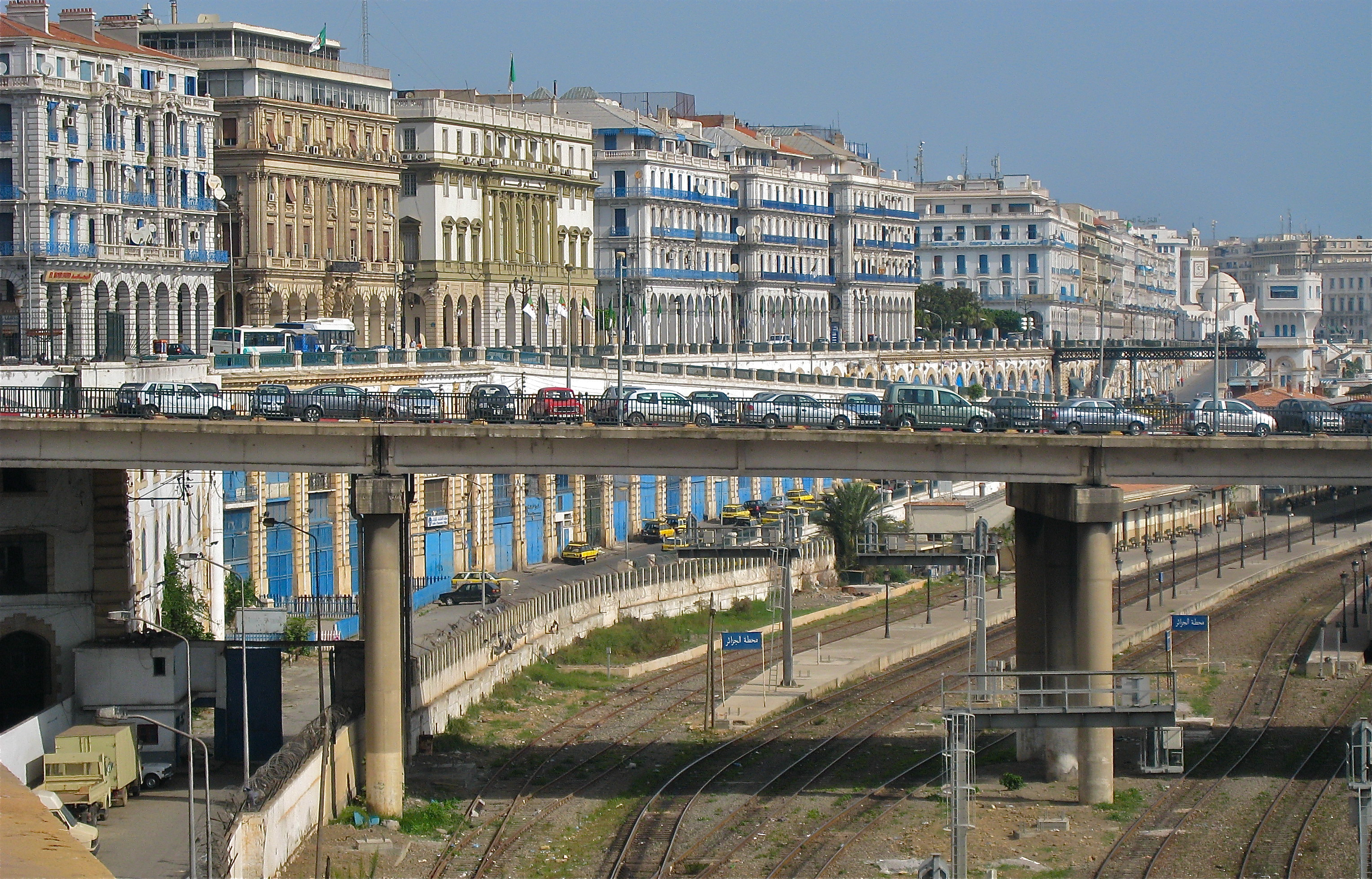
Algiers station in 2007.

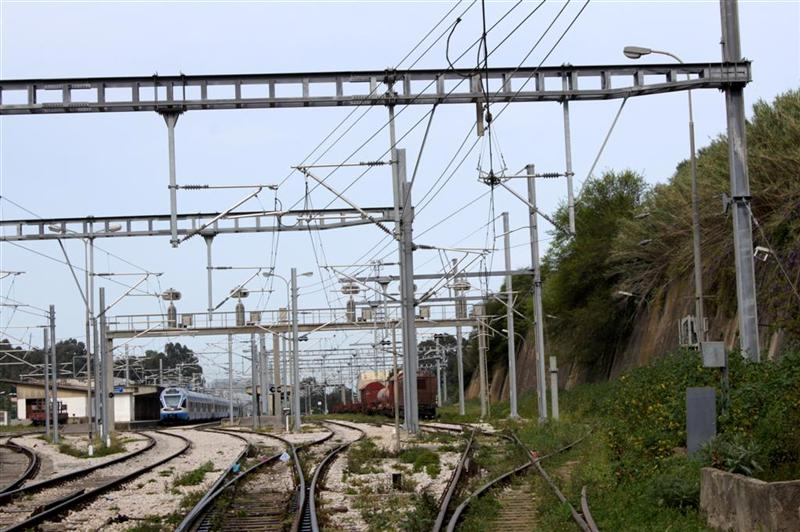
Thénia station in 2010.

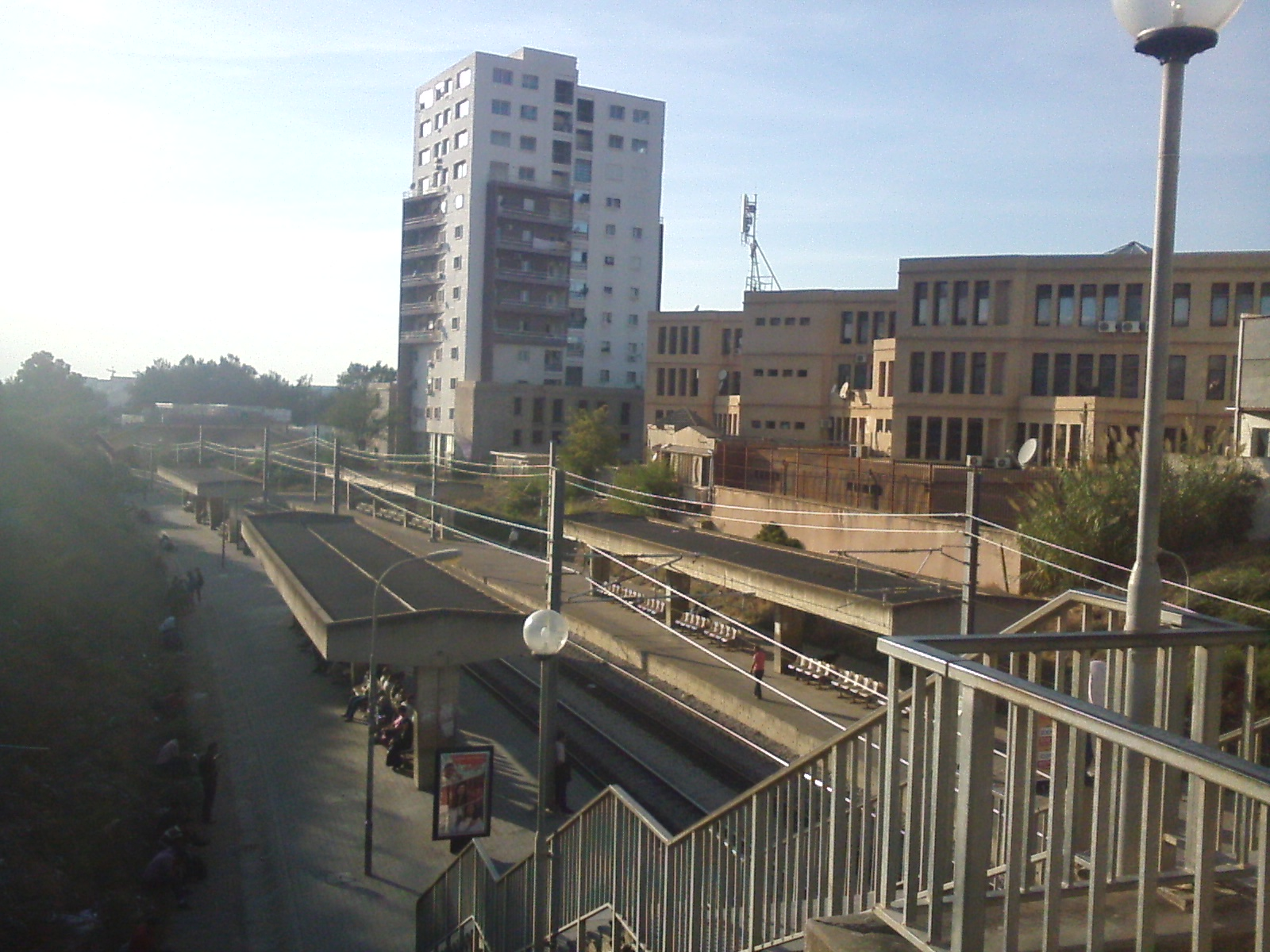
Boumerdès station in 2014.

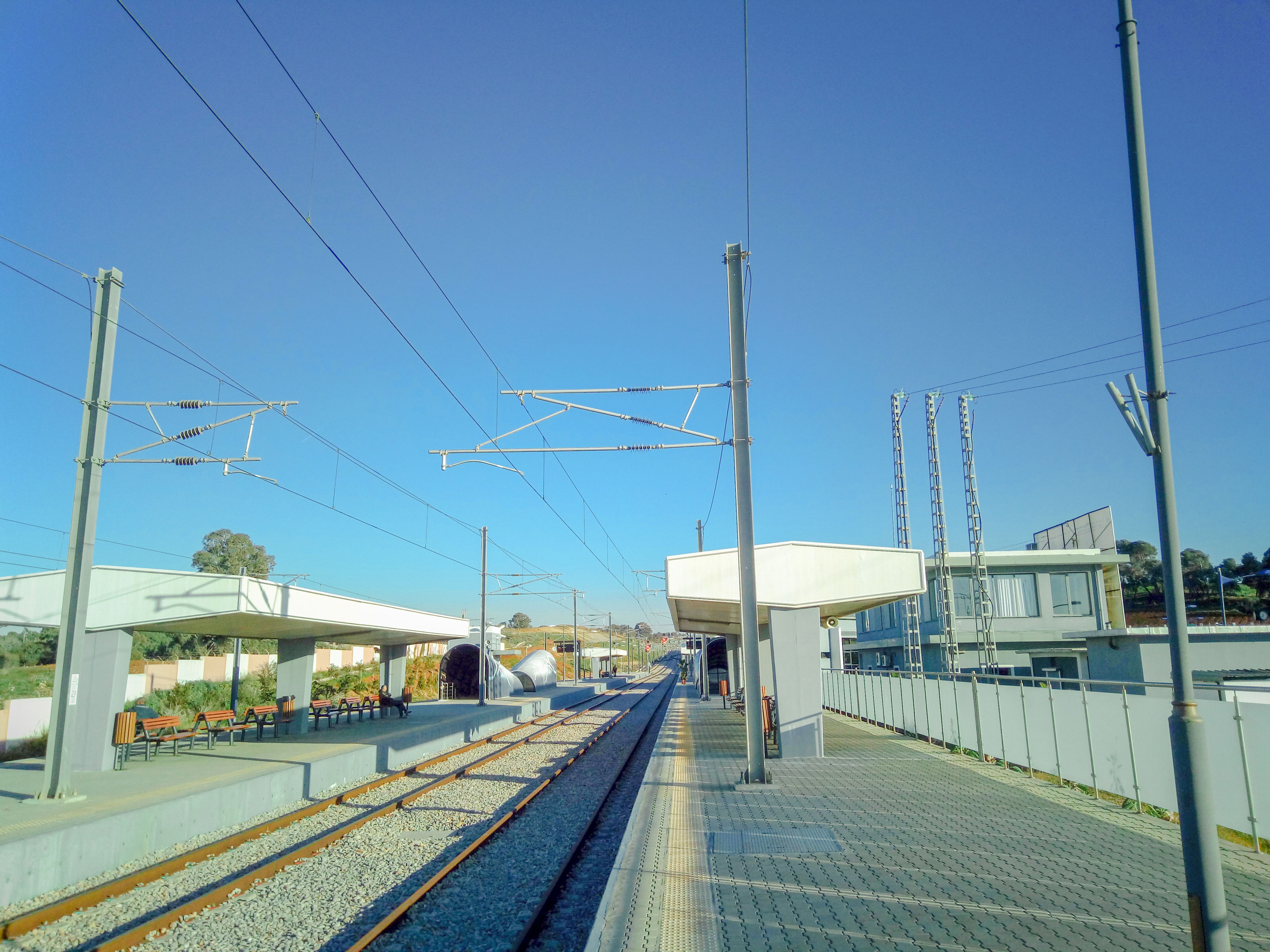
Zéralda station in 2019.

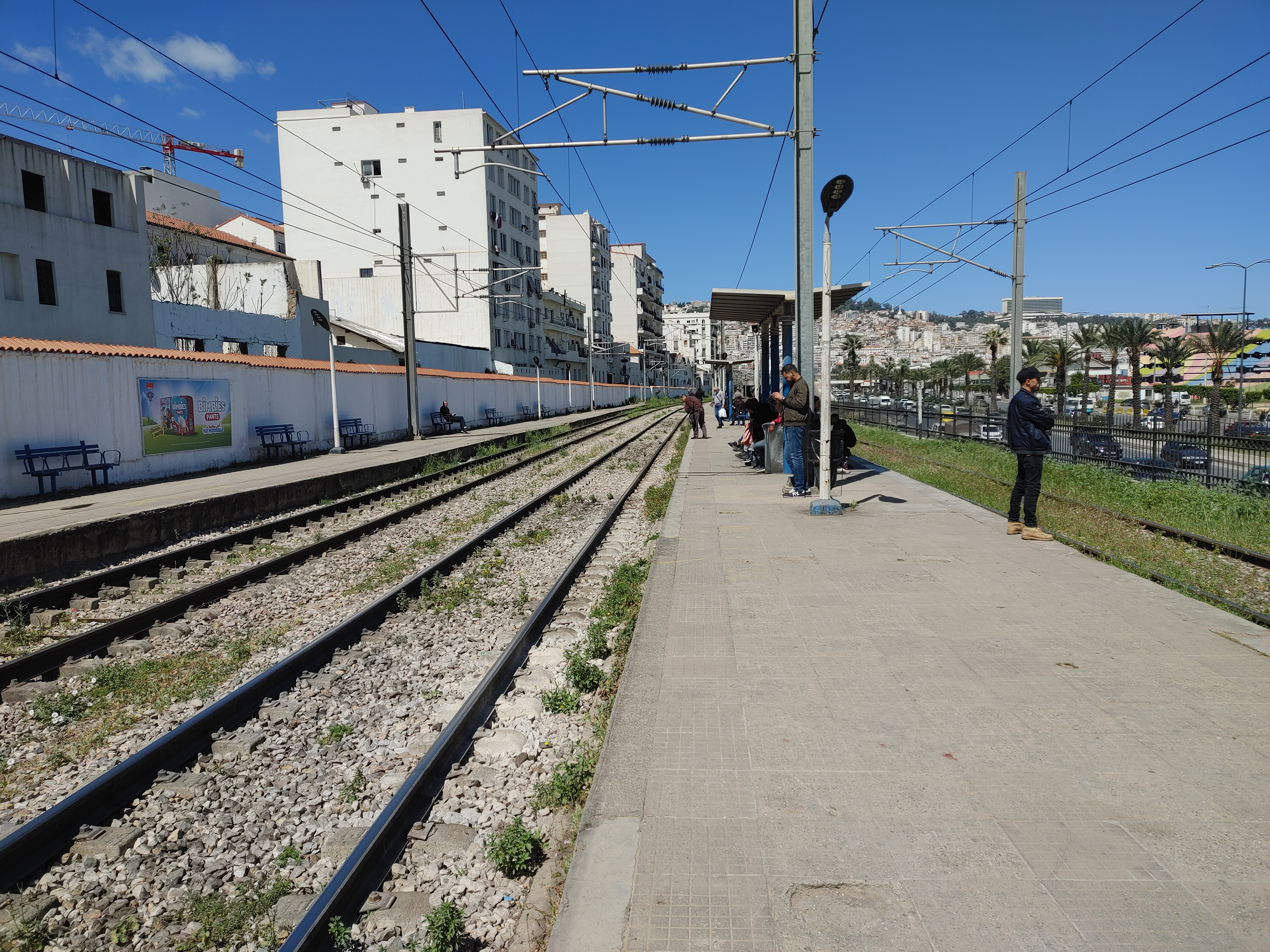
Les Ateliers station in 2024.

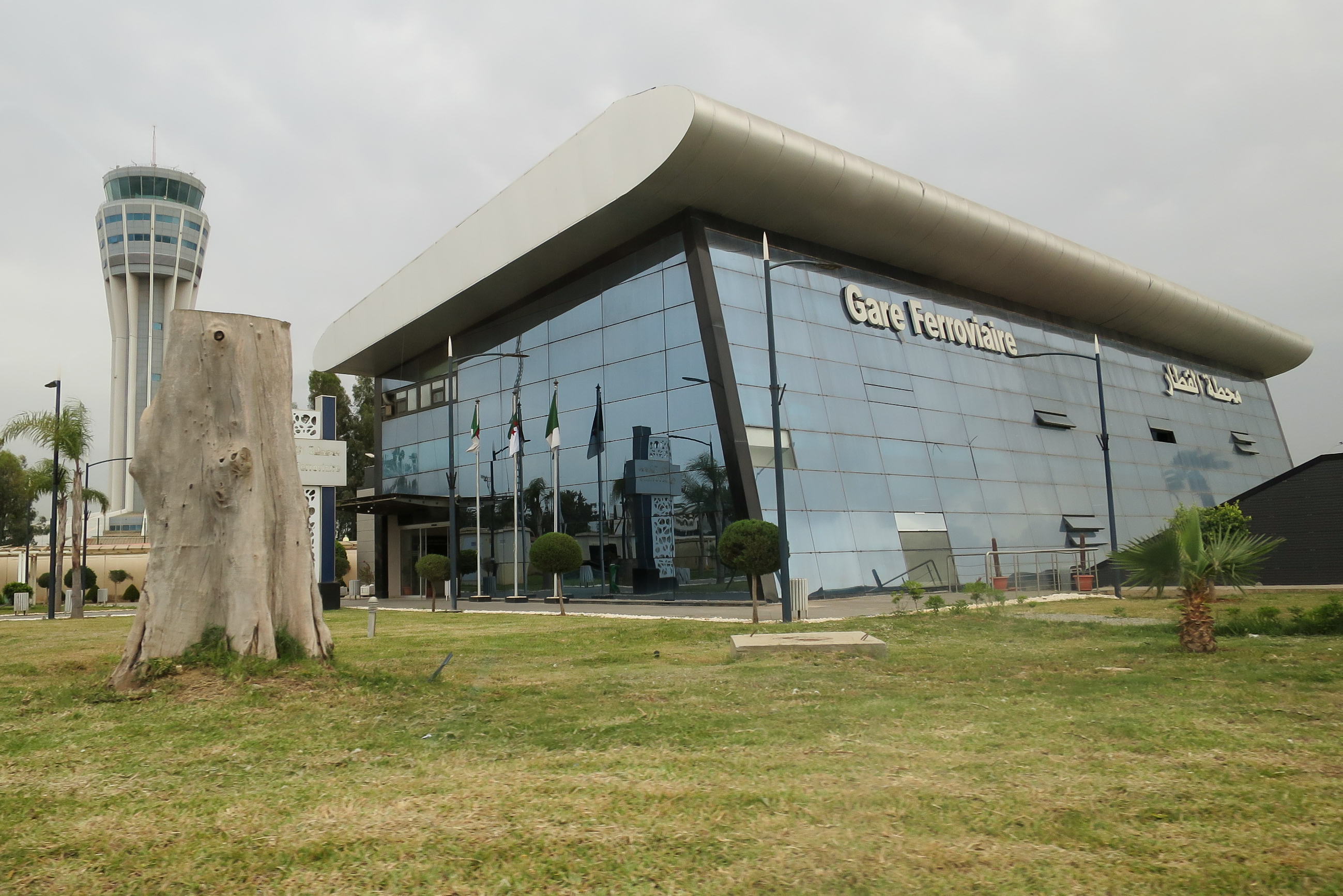
Houari Boumédiène Airport station in 2025.
