= Relizane railway station =

Railway station in Relizane, Algeria

Coordinates: 35.7475°N 0.5556°E

Relizane railway station محطة قطار غليزان
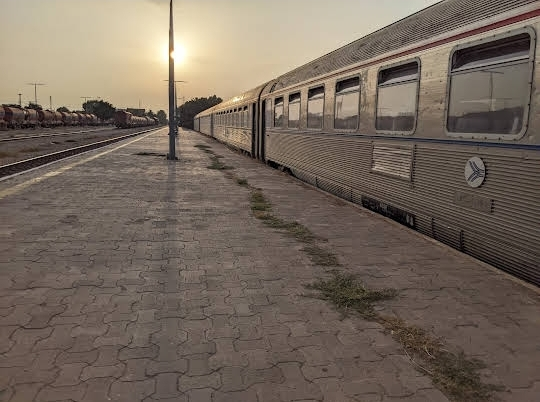

General information
- Location: Rue de l'étoile Algeria
- System: SNTF
- Owner: SNTF
- Operator: SNTF

History
- Opened: 1 November 1868
Location

Relizane railway station (French: Gare de Relizane, Arabic: محطة قطار غليزان) is a train station in the municipality of Relizane in the state of Relizane, Algeria.

== Service ==
Relizane station is served by:

Algiers - Oran link

Liaisons regional trains:

Oran - Chlef

Oran - Relizane
