= Bir Mourad Raïs District =

Bir Mourad Raïs is a district in Algiers Province, Algeria. It was named after its capital, Bir Mourad Raïs.

== Municipalities ==
The district is further divided into 5 municipalities:

- Bir Mourad Raïs
- Hydra
- Saoula
- Birkhadem
- Gué de Constantine
