= Bir Mourad Raïs =

Bir Mourad Raïs / Birmendreïs بير مراد رايس
- Commune
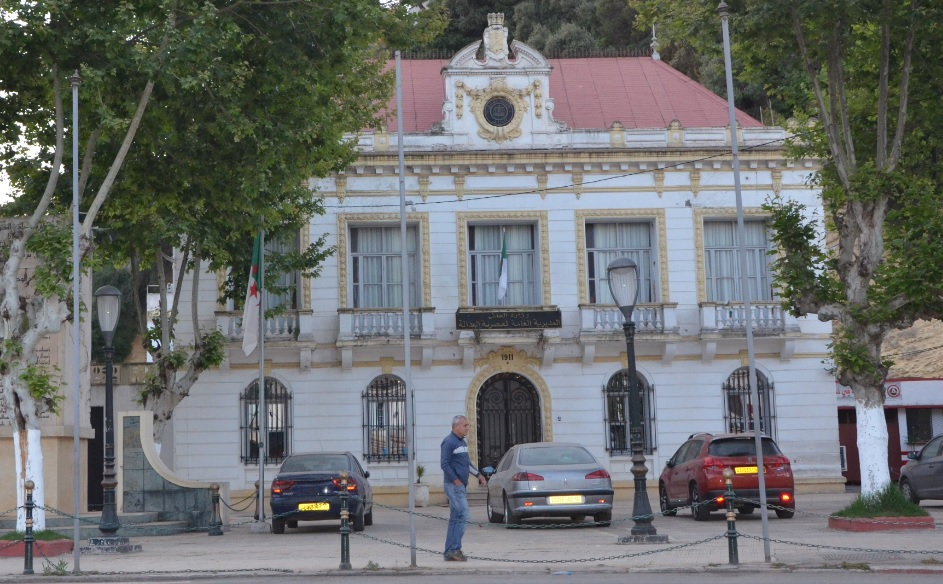
- The townhall
- Nickname: Birmendreis
- Motto: "From the people, for the people"
- Location of Bir Mourad Raïs in Algiers Province

- Location of Bir Mourad Raïs in Algeria
- Coordinates: 36.735°N 03.045°E
- Country: Algeria
- Province: Algiers Province
- District: Bir Mourad Raïs
- APC: 2012-2017

Government
  - Type: Municipality
  - Mayor: Abdelhamid Habik (RND)

Area
  - Land: 4.22 km^{2} (1.63 sq mi)

Population (2008)
  - Total: 45,345
  - Density: 10,745.3/km^{2} (27,830/sq mi)
- Time zone: UTC+1 (CET)
- Postal code: 16005
- ISO 3166 code: CP

Bir Mourad Raïs (Arabic: بئر مراد رايس), formerly Birmendreïs, is a town in Algiers Province, Algeria. The town is named in honor of the famous Ottoman admiral Murat Raïs. It is the birthplace of French Marxist philosopher Louis Althusser, and Ali Haroun, Member of the High Council of State (1992–1994). As of 2008, its population was 45,345.
