= Nahla El Fatiha Naili =

Algerian sculptor (b. 1986)

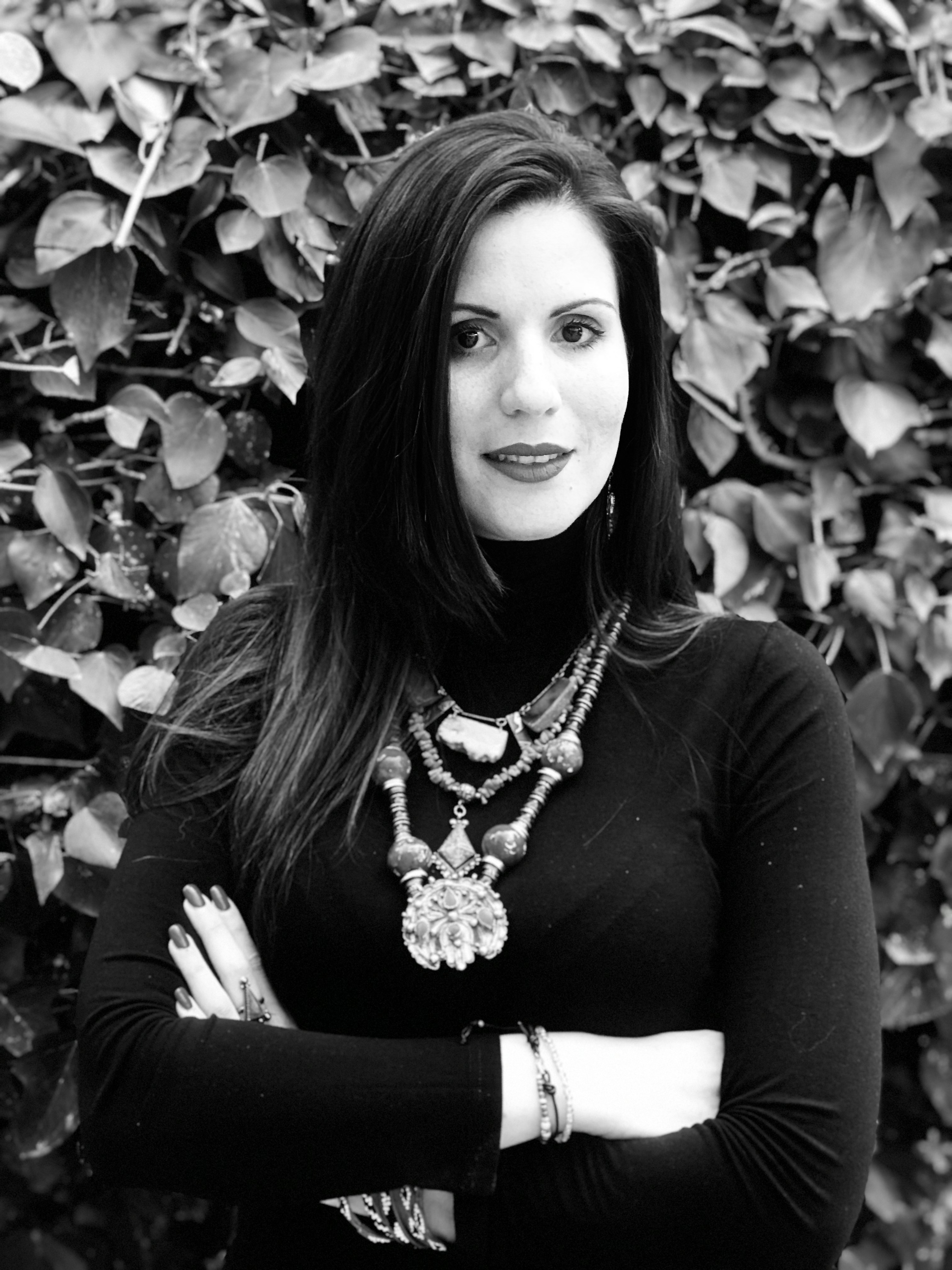
- Naili in 2018
- Born: 14 November 1986 (age 40); Hydra, Algeria
- Occupation: Sculptor

Nahla El Fatiha Naili (in Arabic: نهلة الفاتحة نايلي, in Amazigh: Nahla El-Fatiḥa Naili, in Tifinagh: ⴻⵍ ⴼⴰⵜⵉⵃⴰ ⵏⴰⵉⵍⵉ, born 14 November 1986) is an Algerian sculptor.

== Early life ==
Naili was born the daughter of Rabah Naili, professor in electronic engineering and specialist in meteorology from Azefoun in Tizi Ouzou province, and Hafida Bouhired, model designer from El Aouana in Jijel whose family lived at the Casbah of Algiers. After Naili's parents divorced, she moved with her mother and younger brother Arslan Larbi Redouan, to the family home, Bouhired, located in the heights of Algiers. She is raised by her mother and maternal aunts Zina, Leila, and Houria Bouhired.

== Education ==
In 2007 Naili had her general French Baccalaureate S series studies in the Lycée International of Alexandre-Dumas in Algiers and graduated from the Higher School of Fine Arts in Algiers in 2016. In 2018 she was preparing a doctoral thesis under the theme "Creation and urban heritage: For a practice of contemporary art through the rehabilitation of Algiers "at the Panthéon-Sorbonne University.

Naili has also undertaken various training courses in Morocco and Tunisia on the rehabilitation of medinas. She also participated in several trainings with UNESCO, such as the workshop "Volunteer Management and Public / Private Participation Projects", in July 2017, and at the Med Culture Training "Community Awareness" Resilient to Cultural Heritage Values," in Amman, Jordan in October 2018 and the Net Med Youth Training Program "Increasing appetite for creative digital technologies among young cultural heritage defenders" held in Tunis in December 2018.

== Career and projects ==
Naili is a member and Secretary General of Save the Casbah Association of Algiers. She is also the cofounder of the Awakened Youth Movement.

In 2016, Nahla with her brother Arslan and her cousin Selma Bouhired, initiated The NAS Workshop, a space for reflection for all artistic expressions.

== Exhibitions ==
- participation in l'exposition de la Commedia dell'arte au Centre culturel italien à Alger, 2011
- participation in festival d’art Contemporain (MOST ‘ART) à Mostaganem, 2011
- exposition des « Beaux arts à Didouche Mourad » avec la commune d'Alger-Centre, 2012
- participation in festival National de la création féminine par la réalisation d’une sculpture monumentale à 6 mains, 2012
- participation in palais de la culture Moufdi Zakaria à Alger, 2015
- exposition in l'atelier N.A.S. Casbah d'Alger, Algérie, 2017
- participation in printemps des arts, inauguration d’un marché de l’art Algérien, en qualité d’artiste sculpteure exposante avec la galerie el Yasmine

, 2018

=== Family ===
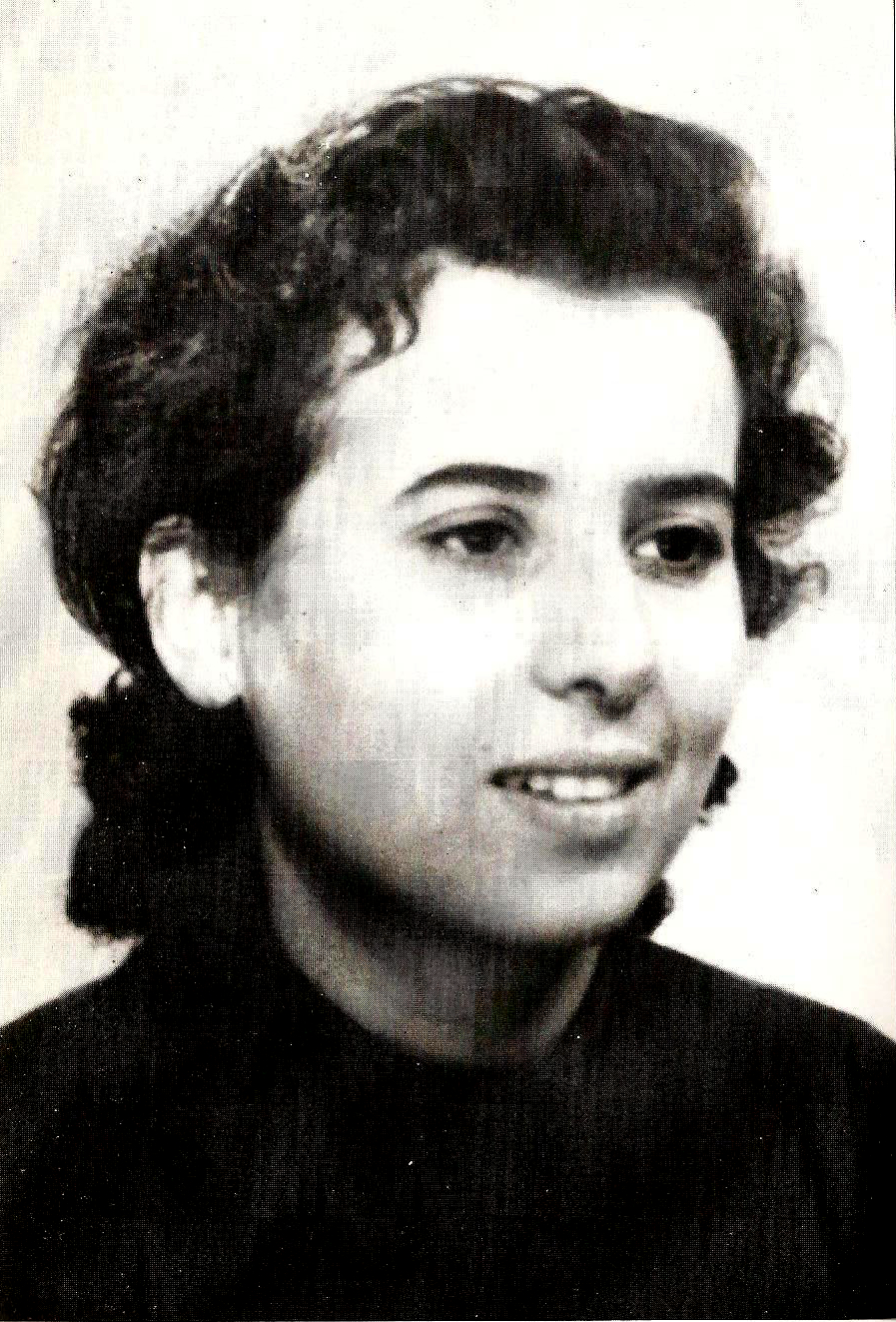
Maternal grandmother Fatiha Bouhired

Her mother, Hafida Bouhired, was the youngest of five siblings from her grandmother's first marriage. Naili's maternal grandfather Mustapha Bouhired was a player in the Racing Club de Paris and sports journalist for Alger Républicain. He fought in the Second World War for the liberation of France before becoming an FLN militant of the Algerian revolution. She was shot dead in the Casbah of Algiers, on 14 March 1957, after his arrest.

Her maternal grandmother Fatiha Bouhired, born Hattali Oukhiti, was also militant like her husband, and throughout the Algerian war the family houses were used as a refuge for the main leaders of the urban guerrillas in Algiers. She was arrested twice at the family home, one with Yacef Saâdi, Zohra Drif, as well as with her six-month-old daughter Hafida Bouhired, who was imprisoned in Serkadji Prison and released.
