= Hydra, Algiers =

Hydra حيدرة
- Municipality
- Commune of Hydra
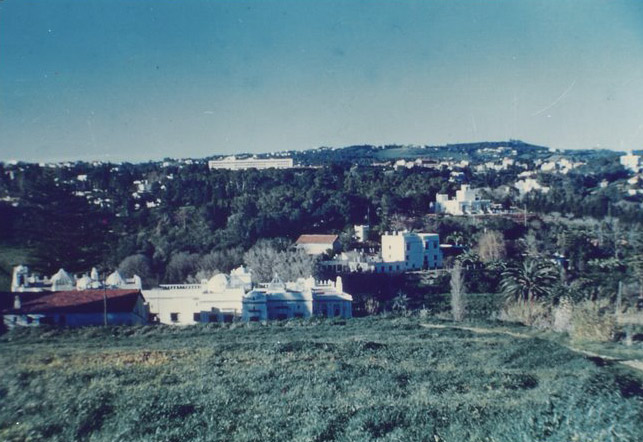
- Ministry of Energy and Mines

- Location of Hydra, Algeria within Algiers Province

- Location of Hydra within Algeria
- Coordinates: 36°44′50″N 3°2′25″E
- Country: Algeria
- Province: Algiers
- District: Bir Mourad Raïs

Government
  - PMA Seats: 11

Population (1998)
  - Total: 35,727
- Demonym: Hydran
- Time zone: UTC+01 (CET)
- Postal code: 16035
- ONS code: 1628

Hydra (Arabic: حيدرة, ḥaydara, pronounced [ˈħajdara]) is a commune in the province of Algiers, Algeria. It is located in Bir Mourad Raïs district, in the plateau of western Algiers, the wealthier part of the national capital. It was heavily affected during the 11 December 2007 Algiers bombings.

The head office of the Ministry of Religious Affairs is in Hydra.

== Education ==
Scuola Italiana Roma di Algeri, a private Italian international school, is in Hydra. It was formerly in another campus in Hydra.

The École japonaise d'Alger (アルジェ日本人学校, Aruje Nihonjin Gakkō), a Japanese international school, was previously located in Hydra. It opened in 1977. The Japanese government designated the school on January 11, 1978 (Showa 53). In 1984 the school had 22 kindergarten students and 35 students in grades 1–9, in elementary and junior high school. It temporarily closed in 1993. The Japanese government certified it on January 12, 1994 (Heisei 6), and revoked the certification on March 29, 2002 (Heisei 14)

=== Situation ===
Hydra is about 6 km (3.7 mi) south west of Algiers city centre.

== Notable people ==
- Nahla El Fatiha Naili, Algerian sculptor.
