= Houari Boumediene Airport Railway Station =

Algerian railway station

Houari Boumediene Airport; railway station; محطة قطار مطار هواري بومدين
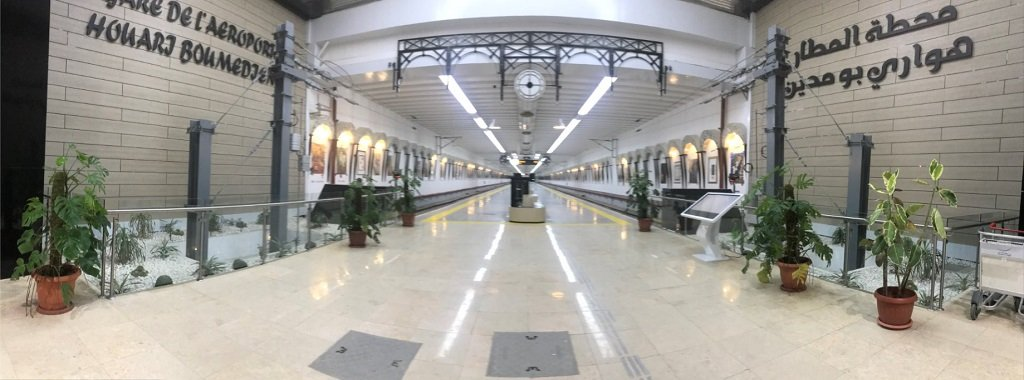
- Station building

General information
- Location: Chemin de l'Aéroport, Dar El Beida. Algeria
- Coordinates: 36°42′01″N 3°12′33″E
- Owner: SNTF

Construction
- Accessible: yes

History
- Opened: 29 April 2019
Location
- Location within Algiers

The Houari Boumediene Airport railway station (French: Gare de l'Aéroport Houari Boumédiène, Arabic: محطة قطار مطار هواري بومدين) is an Algerian railway station located in the district of Dar El Beïda, in the province of Algiers. It serves the Algiers Airport.

== Location ==
The station is located at the end of a short 2.8 km long railway line, of which 1.6 km is underground, originating from the east of Bab Ezzouar station on the Algiers-Skikda line.

== History ==
It was in the early 2010s that the idea of creating a station at Algiers Airport came to fruition. The establishment of this railway line aimed to facilitate the mobility of travelers from the center of Algiers to the airport, thereby offering a new solution for passengers leaving the airport to reach various cities connected to the regional and national railway network.

Construction work began on 11 December 2012. The new station and its railway line were inaugurated on 29 April 2019.

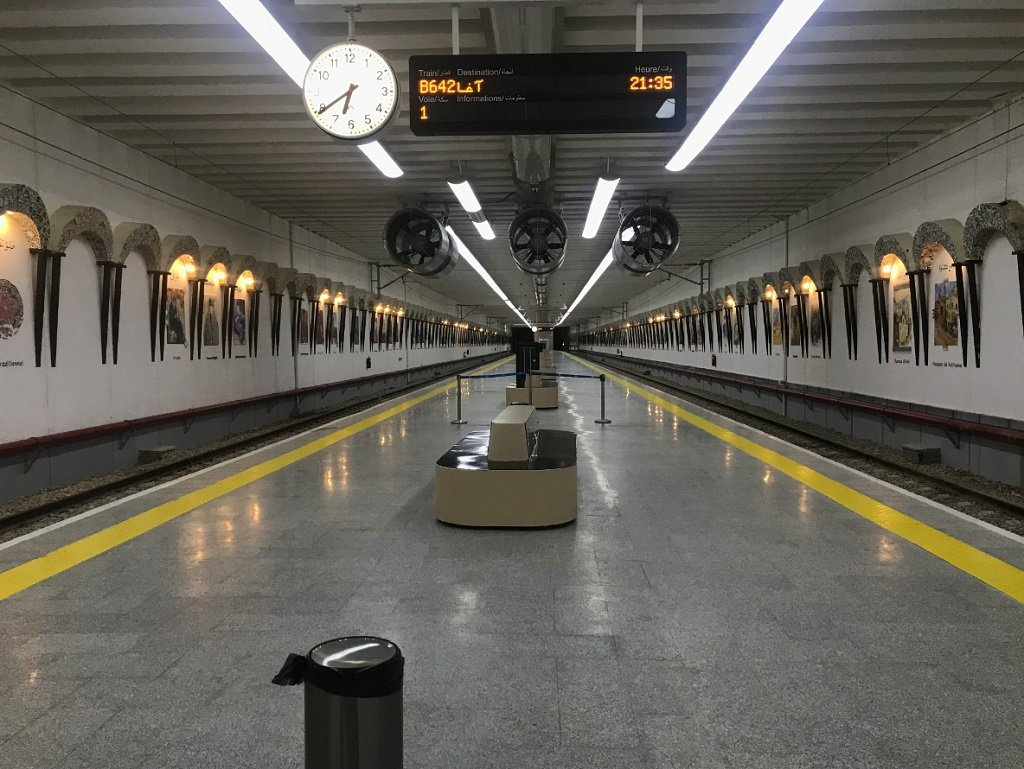
Station serving Houari Boumediene Airport.

== Passenger service ==
The Airport station is located between Terminal 1 and Terminal 2 of the airport. It is approximately a 5-minute walk from Terminal 4.

Access to the station can be done directly from the airport, as well as through the car park of Terminal 4 and Terminals 1 and 2.

== Service ==
The station is served by trains from the suburban rail network of Algiers, with the terminus at Agha station in Algiers.

The trains connect Algiers to the airport in 20 minutes, with 34 journeys per day from 5:00 AM to 9:05 PM departing from Agha station, and from 5:30 AM to 9:35 PM from the airport. The fare for this journey is 80 DZA for adults and 40 DZA for children.

== Connections ==
The station is served by lines 39 and 100 of the ETUSA network.

== Project ==
In 2026, the station will be connected to Line 1 of the Algiers Metro.
