= Oued Smar =

Coordinates: 36°39′N 3°09′E

- Interactive map of Oued Smar
- Country: Algeria
- Province: Algiers
- Time zone: UTC+1 (West Africa Time)

Oued Smar is a suburb of the city of Algiers in northern Algeria.
