= Algiers–Oran railway =

Railway line in Algeria

Algiers-Oran railway
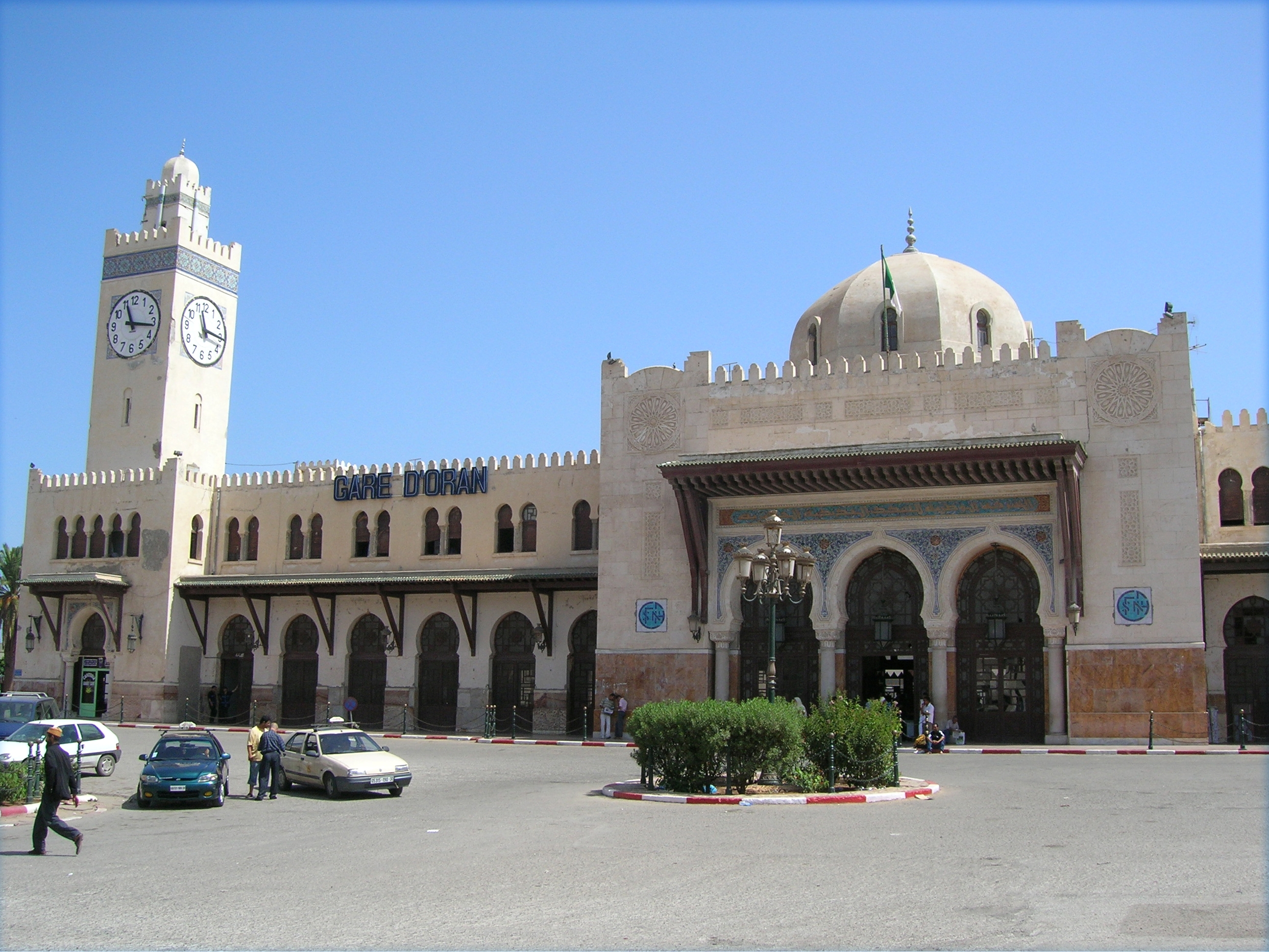
- Oran station, 2008

Service
- Type: Heavy rail
- System: SNTF

History
- Opened: 8 September 1862
- Last extension: 1871

Technical
- Line length: 420 km (260 mi)
- Number of tracks: Mainly single track
- Track gauge: 1,435 mm (4 ft 8 1/2 in) standard gauge
- Electrification: 25 kV AC overhead line from Algiers station to El Affroun
- Operating speed: 120 km/h (75 mph)
Route map
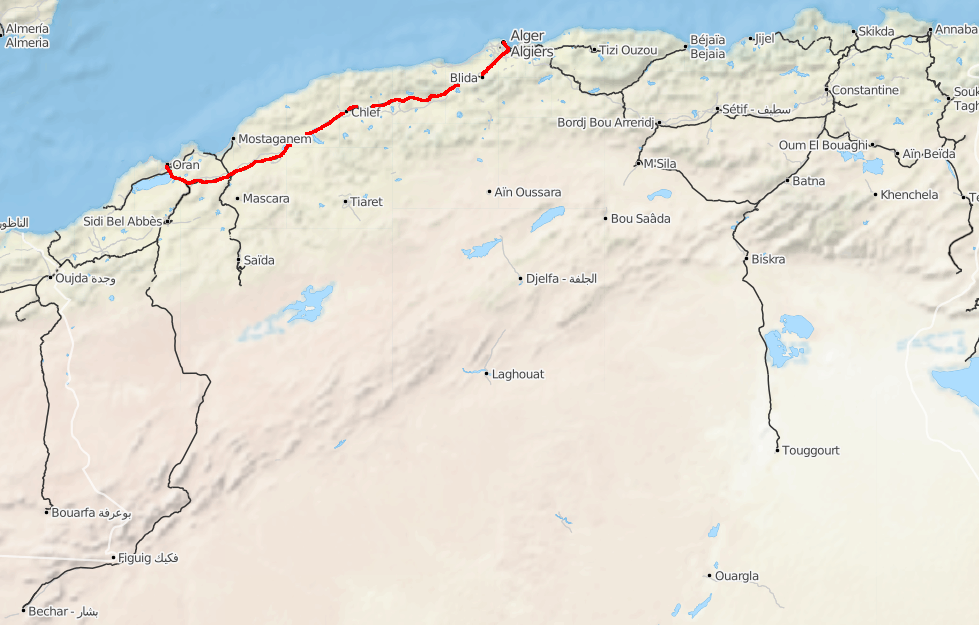

The Algiers–Oran railway is one of the major components of the Algerian railway network. It links Algiers station with Oran. The first segment of the line, connecting Algiers with Blida opened on September 8, 1862 and was extended to Oran on May 1, 1871.

The National Company for Rail Transport is converting the entirety of the line to a double-track line.

== History ==
The Oran–Relizane section was opened to travelers on November 1, 1868 and was extended to Khemis Miliana (called Affreville whilst part of French Algeria) on September 1, 1870. The Algiers–Blida section was extended to Boumedfaâ on July 8, 1869, while the last segment – 29 kilometers from Affreville to Boumedfaâ was – completed on May 1, 1871 and enabled through-service from Algiers to Oran.

More recently, the segment of the line from Algiers to El Affroun has been electrified to improve commuter rail connecting the two cities.

== Line description ==
=== Algiers–El Affroun section ===
The 70-kilometer section from Algiers to El Affroun includes one of the five commuter rail services in the Algiers metropolitan area and is double-track and is electrified (25,000 volt).

This section is the busiest in the entirety of SNTF network, with 130 passenger trains a day using the 10-kilometer Algiers–El Harrach section until the El Harrach wye. Of the 130 passenger trains using the Algiers–El Harrach section, 58 continue west and use the remainder of the Algiers–El Affroun section.

=== El Affroun–Oran section ===
The El Affroun–Oran segment is not electrified and is being upgraded from single-track to double-track. In 2015, 77 kilometers between Khemis Miliana and Chlef and 107 kilometers between Yellel and Oran have been double-tracked. Bypasses are being constructed to avoid Khemis Miliana and Relizane traffic for through-trains.

==== Line description ====
The line is flat except for the 50 kilometers between El Affroun and Khemis Miliana where the elevation changes from 100 to 500–250 meters above sea level. A 7-kilometer tunnel is being built to more directly connect the Khemis Miliana and Oued Djer portion of this segment.

=== Speeds on the line ===
Average speeds for passenger services on the line are 80–90 km/h. Since 2008, SNTF acquired DMUs capable of reaching 160 km/h which are expected to reach their top speed on flat double-track segments of the Algiers–Oran line.
