= Saoula =

- Interactive map of Saoula
- Coordinates: 36°42′N 3°01′E
- Country: Algeria
- Province: Algiers
- Elevation: 200 m (660 ft)

Population (2010)
  - Total: 50,000
- Time zone: UTC+1 (West Africa Time)

Saoula is a suburb of the city of Algiers in northern Algeria. It is one of the five municipalities in the Bir Mourad Raïs District.

Saoula's name most likely comes from two Arabic words: saha, which means "open place", and oula, which means "first". This literally translates to "first open place". Saoula is home to WB Saoula, a football team that plays in the fourth tier of the Algerian Football League system. WB Saoula plays at the Stadium of Saoula, which in 2012 has been renovated to include more seats and artificial turf installed.

The municipality of Saoula serves as a gateway to larger parts of Algiers, most notably Birkhadem.

== History ==
The commune of Saoula was created in 1843 and at first was a part of Birkhadem, Saoula becomes an independent municipality on December 2, 1963. It would later join the separate city of Tipaza, in 1997, Saoula returned to being an independent commune.
