= Algiers railway station =

Train station in Algeria

Algiers railway station محطة قطار الجزائر
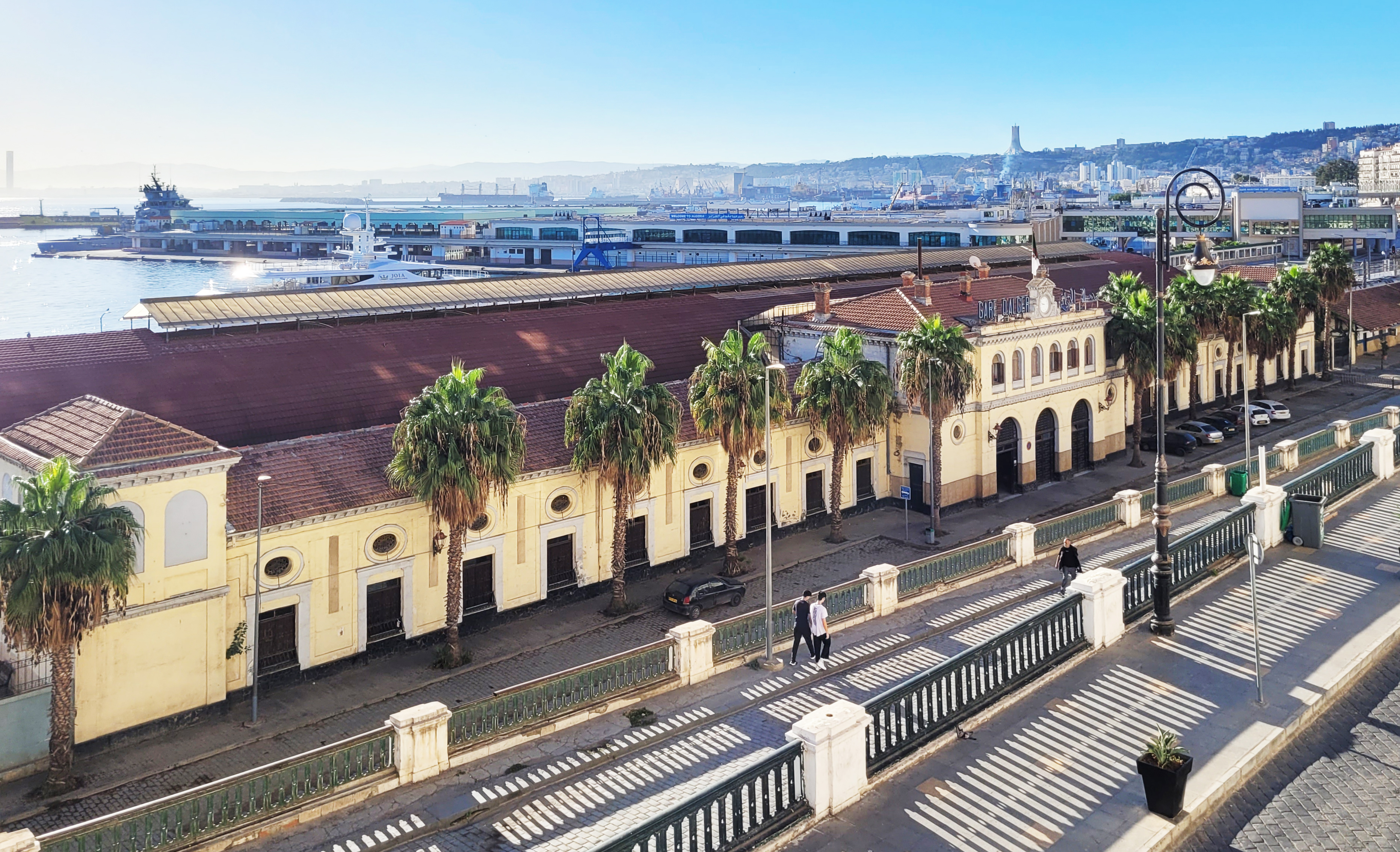

General information
- Location: Road d'Angkor, Alger-Centre, 16000, algiers, Algeria. Algeria
- Coordinates: 36.779247°N 3.061821°E
- System: SNTF
- Owner: SNTF
- Operator: SNTF

Other information
- Website: sntf.dz

History
- Opened: 15 August 1862
Location

Algiers railway station (French: Gare d'Alger, Arabic: محطة قطار الجزائر) is a train station in the municipality of Algiers in the state of Algeria, located near the Kasbah of Algiers and the port of Algiers. Many types of trains of different grades depart from it to all parts of Algeria.

The station is considered to be the central station of the city of Algiers and the rest of the country.

== History ==
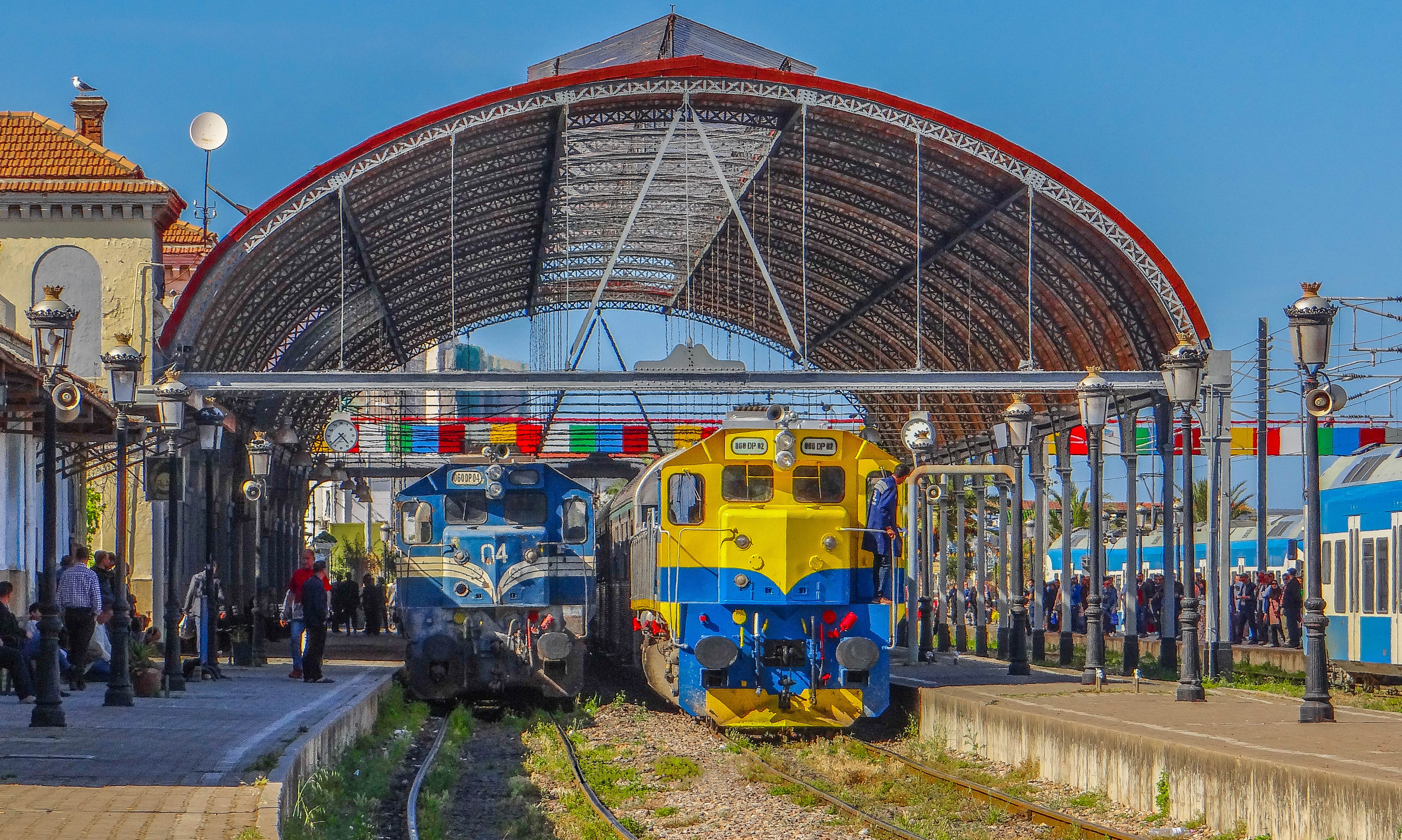
The station in 2018

The station's history dates back to the second half of the nineteenth century, when it was inaugurated with the Blida train station on August 15, 1862, in parallel with the receipt of the first railway line, 50 km long, linking the city of Algiers with the city of Blida.

French architect Charles Frédéric Chassériau designed the station. Its construction began during the French occupation of Algeria, immediately after the approval of the imperial decree on April 8, 1857, to establish a railway line from Algiers to Oran.

The Algerian Railways Company undertook the completion of this project according to the formula of the railway exploitation concession by two contracts dated June 20, 1860 and July 11, 1860.

In 1858, Napoleon III had ordered to prepare the land extending from the Kasbah of Algiers to the end of Boufarik, in preparation for the completion of the railway.

The construction of the Algiers train station was completed and inaugurated in the year 1865 during the completion of a railway line from Algiers to Oran.

The railway line from Algiers to Blida began on September 8, 1862 for the commodity train, then on October 25, 1862 for the passenger train.

The Algiers train station was reconstructed at the beginning of the twentieth century. It was renovated in 2016.

== Algiers Metro ==
The Ali Boumendjel Metro Station (line 1), located at the intersection of Larbi Ben M'hidi, Ali Boumendjel and Patrice Lumumba streets, about 600 meters away, is accessible by leaving the station and taking the public road.
