= List of MC Alger records and statistics =

MC Alger is an Algerian sports club based in Algiers which is best known for its professional association football team. They played their first match in 1921. This list includes the major honours won by MC Alger and all-time statistics and records set by the club, its players and its coaches. The players section includes the club's top goalscorers and those who have made most appearances in first-team competitive matches. It also displays international achievements by players representing MC Alger, and the highest transfer fees paid and received by the club.

== Honours ==
As of the 2023–24 season, MC Alger have won a total of 26 titles (regional competitions not considered), of which 20 were achieved domestically and 1 were obtained in international competitions. The club's most recent honour is the 2023–24 Algerian Ligue Professionnelle 1.

MC Alger honours
Honour	No.	Years
Ligue 1	10	1971–72, 1974–75, 1975–76, 1977–78, 1978–79, 1998–99, 2009–10, 2023–24, 2024–25, 2025–26
Algerian Cup	8	1970–71, 1972–73, 1975–76, 1982–83, 2005–06, 2006–07, 2013–14, 2015–16
Algerian Super Cup	5	2006, 2007, 2014, 2024, 2025
Algerian League Cup	1	1998
CAF Champions League	1	1976
Maghreb Cup Winners' Cup	2	1971, 1974

== Players ==
=== Appearances ===
- Most appearances: Abdeslam Bousri – 378 (1972–1987);
- Most appearances in a season:
- Oldest title winner:
- Oldest league title winner:
- Youngest league title winner:
- Most league appearances: Abdeslam Bousri – 310 (1972–1987);
- Most Algerian Cup appearances:
- Most African Cup appearances: Abderahmane Hachoud – 34 (2006–2007, 2012–2022);
- Most league appearances by a non-Algerian player: Moussa Coulibaly – 119 (2004–2009);
- Youngest debutant:
- Youngest starter in the league:
- Youngest league debutant:
- Youngest debutant in the African Cup / CAF Champions League:
- Youngest captain in the African Cup / CAF Champions League: Abdelouahab Zenir – 24 years, 11 months and 12 days (against Enugu Rangers, 1976 African Cup of Champions Clubs Semi-finals, first leg, 22 October 1976);
- Youngest debutant in a CAF competition:

==== Most appearances ====
Competitive matches only, includes appearances as used substitute. Numbers in brackets indicate goals scored.

#	Name	Years	League	Cup	Others^{1}	Africa^{2}	Total
1	(Algeria) Abdeslam Bousri	1972–1987	310 (137)	40 (17)	8 (1)	20 (9)	378 (164)
2	(Algeria) Bouzid Mahiouz	1971–1986	0 (0)	0 (0)	6 (0)	21 (1)	345 (15)
3	(Algeria) Omar Betrouni	1968–1979	264 (78)	40 (11)	7 (2)	18 (4)	329 (95)
4	(Algeria) Abdelwahab Zenir	1968–1984	0 (0)	0 (0)	0 (0)	18 (3)	325 (41)
5	(Algeria) Abderahmane Hachoud	2012–2022	238 (42)	26 (4)	12 (0)	34 (5)	310 (51)
6	(Algeria) Ali Bencheikh	1972–1988	238 (36)	32 (10)	5 (1)	15 (3)	290 (50)
7	(Algeria) Mohamed Ait Mouhoub	1973–1986	0 (0)	0 (0)	1 (0)	16 (0)	0 (0)
8	(Algeria) Réda Babouche	2004–2003	210 (15)	21 (0)	10 (1)	13 (3)	254 (19)
9	(Algeria) Nasser Bouiche	1977–1987	0 (0)	0 (0)	0 (0)	0 (0)	250 (67)
10	(Algeria) Hadj Bouguèche	2005–2017	193 (50)	29 (9)	12 (4)	10 (0)	244 (63)

^{1} ^{Includes the Super Cup, League Cup, Maghreb Cup Winners' Cup, Maghreb Champions Cup, Arab Champions League and UAFA Club Cup.} ^{2} ^{Includes the Cup Winners' Cup, CAF Cup, Confederation Cup and Champions League.}

=== Goalscorers ===
- Most goals: 164 – Abdeslam Bousri;
- Most league goals: 137 – Abdeslam Bousri;
- Most seasons as league top scorer: 3 – Abdeslam Bousri – (1977–78, 1981–82, 1982–83);
- Most goals in international club competitions: Hichem Nekkache – 11;
- Most goals in international club competitions in a season: 6 – Hichem Nekkache (2018 CAF Champions League).
- Most goals in a match: Samy Frioui, 5 goals (against RC Relizane, Ligue 1, 13 March 2022).
- Youngest league scorer:
- Youngest hat-trick scorer in the league:
- Oldest goalscorer:

==== Top goalscorers in all competitions ====
Matches played (including as used substitute) appear in brackets.

#	Name	Years	League	Cup	Others^{1}	Africa^{2}	Total
1	(Algeria) Abdeslam Bousri	1972–1987	137 (310)	17 (40)	1 (8)	9 (20)	164 (378)
2	(Algeria) Omar Betrouni	1968–1979	78 (264)	11 (40)	2 (7)	4 (18)	95 (329)
3	(Algeria) Nasser Bouiche	1977–1987	0 (0)	0 (0)	0 (0)	0 (0)	67 (250)
4	(Algeria) Hadj Bouguèche	2005–2017	50 (193)	9 (29)	4 (12)	0 (10)	63 (244)
5	(Algeria) Zoubir Aouadj	1963–1969	0 (0)	0 (0)	–	–	63 (0)
6	(Algeria) Hassen Tahir	1967–1973	0 (0)	0 (0)	0 (0)	–	61 (0)

^{1} ^{Includes the Super Cup, League Cup, Arab Champions League and UAFA Club Cup.} ^{2} ^{Includes the Cup Winners' Cup, CAF Cup, Confederation Cup and Champions League.}

==== Top goalscorers in international club competitions ====
Matches played (Matches played) appear in brackets.

Rank	Name	Nationality	Years	Total
1	Hichem Nekkache	Algeria	2016–2020	11 (17)
2	Abdeslam Bousri	Algeria	1972–1987	9 (20)
3	Zoubir Bachi	Algeria	1968–1979	6 (15)
4	Walid Derrardja	Algeria	2015–2020	5 (21)
5	Abderahmane Hachoud	Algeria	2006–2022	5 (34)

=== National teams ===
- Most international caps while a MC Alger player: Ali Bencheikh – 40 caps for Algeria;
- First capped player: Abderrahmane Boubekeur for Algeria (2–1 against Bulgaria, 6 January 1963);
- First player(s) capped for Algeria to play in the Olympic football tournament: Bouzid Mahyouz, Lakhdar Belloumi (1980 Summer Olympics);
- First player(s) to appear for Algeria at the FIFA World Cup: Ali Bencheikh (1982 FIFA World Cup);
- First player(s) to appear for Algeria at the Africa Cup of Nations: Bouzid Mahyouz, Lakhdar Belloumi (1980 African Cup of Nations).
- Youngest starter for Algeria: Ali Bencheikh – 21 years, 9 months and 22 days (2–1 against Libya, friendly, 1 November 1976).

=== Honours ===
- Most titles: Abdelwahab Zenir (10)
- Most league titles: Bouzid Mahiouz, Omar Betrouni, Abdeslam Bousri, Abdelwahab Zenir (5)
- Most Algerian Cup titles: Abdelwahab Zenir (4)
- Most Super Cup titles: Farouk Belkaïd, Fayçal Badji, Réda Babouche, Hadj Bouguèche, Larbi Hosni, Sofiane Younès (2)
- Most titles in international club competitions:

=== Transfers ===
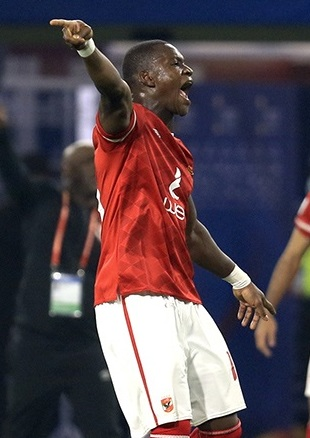
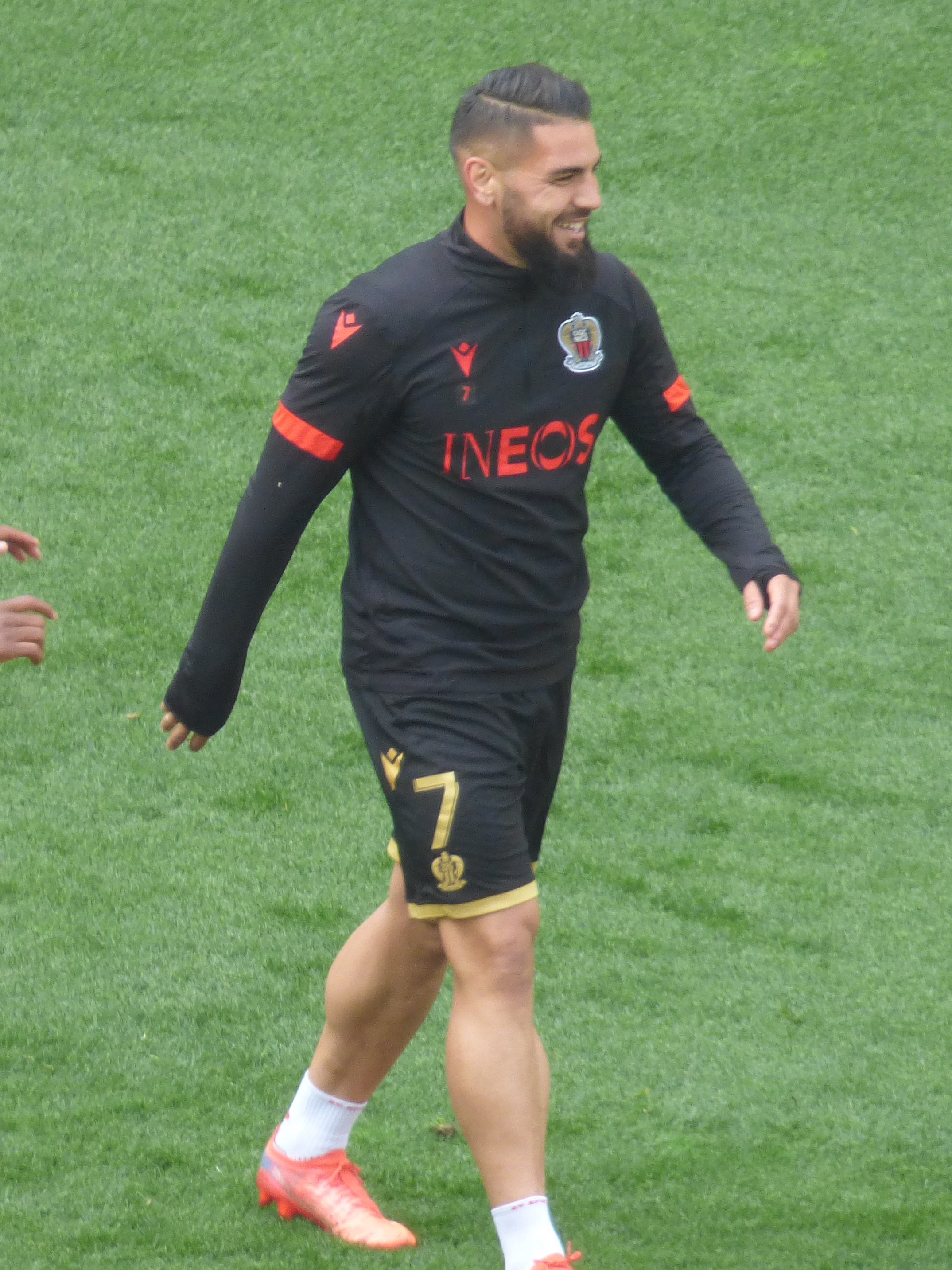
The transfers of Aliou Dieng (left) and Andy Delort (right) represent respectively the highest player fees ever received and paid by MC Alger.

Highest player fees received by MC Alger
#	Name	Fee	Buying club	Date	Ref
1	(Mali) Aliou Dieng	1,100,000 US$	(Egypt) Al Ahly	5 Jul 2019	
2	(Algeria) Youcef Belaïli	679,000 €	(Tunisia) ES Tunis	28 Jul 2024	

Highest player fees paid by MC Alger
#	Name	Fee	Previous club	Date	Ref
1	(Algeria) Andy Delort	1,500,000 €	(Qatar) Umm Salal SC	10 Sep 2024	
2	(Guinea) Mohamed Bangoura	400,000 €	(Guinea) Hafia FC	5 Feb 2025	
3	(Ivory Coast) Mohamed Zougrana	300,000 €	(Ivory Coast) ASEC Mimosas	19 Jul 2023	
4	(Ivory Coast) Kipre Junior	230,000 €	(Tanzania) Azam	9 Jul 2024	
5	(Algeria) Sofiane Bayazid	50,000,000 DA	(Algeria) USM Khenchela	27 Jul 2023	

== Management ==
=== Coaches ===
- Most seasons: 4 – Hamid Zouba (1974–1977, 1987–1988);
- Most consecutive seasons: 3 – Hamid Zouba (1974–1977);
- Most matches: 133 – Hamid Zouba;
- Most matches in international club competitions:
- Most titles in a season: 2 – Hamid Zouba (1975–76);
- Most Ligue 1 titles: 2 – Hamid Zouba (1974–75, 1975–76);
- Most consecutive Ligue 1 titles: 2 – Hamid Zouba;
- Most Algerian Cup titles:
- Most titles in international club competitions: 1 – Hamid Zouba (1976);
- Youngest coach:
- Youngest coach to win an official competition:
- Youngest coach to win the Ligue 1:
- Youngest coach to win an international club competition: Hamid Zouba – 40 years, 8 months and 10 days (African Cup of Champions Clubs, 12 December 1976);

=== Presidents ===
- Longest-serving president:
- Most titles:
  - Most Ligue 1 titles:
  - Most Algerian Cup titles:
  - Most Super Cup titles:
  - Most titles in international club competitions:

== Club ==
=== Matches ===
- Most official matches in a season:
- Best league start:

==== Firsts ====
- First match:
- First Ligue 1 match: 0–2 RS Alger (1962–63 Critérium d'Honneur, 7 October 1962);
- First Algerian Cup match: MC Alger 4–2 US Bouzaréah (1962–63 Algerian Cup, 4 November 1962);
- First Super Cup match: JS Kabylie 1–2 MC Alger (2006 Algerian Super Cup, 1 November 2006);
- First League Cup match: USM Blida 1–1 MC Alger (1995–96 Algerian League Cup, 30 November 1995);
- First match in international club competitions: Al-Ahly Benghazi 3–2 MC Alger (1976 African Cup of Champions Clubs first round, 30 April 1976);

==== Wins ====
- Biggest win: 10–1 (against JSI Issers, 1962–63 Critérium d'Honneur, 14 October 1962);
- Biggest Ligue 1 win:
- Biggest Algerian Cup win:
- Biggest Super Cup win: 4–0 (against ES Sétif, 2007 Algerian Super Cup, 1 November 2007);
- Biggest win in international club competitions: 9–0 (against AS Otôho, 2018 CAF Champions League qualifying rounds second leg, 21 February 2018);
- Most wins in a season: 24 (2023–24);
- Most consecutive league wins in a season:
- Fewest wins in the league in a season: 3 (1997–98 Algerian Championnat National);
- Most consecutive away league wins in a season:
- Most international club competition wins in a season:
- Most consecutive international club competition wins in a season:

==== Defeats ====
- Biggest defeat:
- Biggest Algerian Cup defeat: 1–4 (against MO Constantine, 1963–64 Algerian Cup, 29 March 1964);
- Biggest Super Cup defeat: 0–2 (against USM Alger, 2016 Super Cup, 1 November 2016);
- Biggest Ligue 1 defeat: 1–8 (against WA Tlemcen, 2004–05 Division 1 matchday 30, 13 June 2005);
- Biggest defeat in international club competitions: 1–5 (against ASC Jeanne d'Arc, CAF Champions League First round, 1 April 2000);
- Most defeats in the league in a season:
- Fewest defeats in the league in a season:
- Most consecutive home matches without defeats:
- Most consecutive home matches without defeats in the league:
- Most consecutive matches without defeats in the league:

=== Goals ===
- First goal in international club competitions: (against Al-Ahly Benghazi, 1976 African Cup of Champions Clubs first round, 30 April 1976);
- Most league goals scored in a season: 63 (in 30 matches, 1975–76 Algerian Championnat National);
- Fewest league goals scored in a season: 8 (in 14 matches, 1997–98 Algerian Championnat National);
- Most league goals conceded in a season: 48 (in 26 matches, 1976–77 Algerian Championnat National);
- Fewest league goals conceded in a season: 16 (in 27 matches, 1998–99 Algerian Championnat National);
- Most international club competition goals scored in a season: 21 (in 10 matches, 1976 African Cup of Champions Clubs);
- Most league minutes without conceding goals:
- Most consecutive league matches scoring goals:

=== Points ===
- Most points in a season:
  - Two points for a win:
  - Three points for a win:
- Fewest points in a season:
  - Two points for a win:
  - Three points for a win:
- Biggest distance in points to runners-up:
  - Two-point-per-win system (before 1994–95):

=== Stadiums ===
On August 8, 2021, the president of the republic Abdelmadjid Tebboune has announced that the management of the new stadium will be for MC Alger. As he recalled the founding of the Club on August 7, 1921, by the late Abderrahmane Aouf, and returned to the team's obstacle course and its stoppage before and during the Algerian war. On July 3, 2024, Ali La Pointe Stadium in Douéra was officially inaugurated by the president of the republic Abdelmadjid Tebboune. The stadium should host MC Alger matches from the start of the 2024–25 season.

- Stade Omar Hammadi:
  - First match:
  - First goal:
- Stade 5 Juillet 1962 (1972–):
  - First match: NAR Alger 0–1 MC Alger (Nationale I, 17 September 1972);
  - First goal: Omar Betrouni (against NAR Alger, Nationale I, 17 September 1972);
- Ali La Pointe Stadium (2024–):
  - First match: MC Alger 2–0 US Monastir (CAF Champions League, 21 September 2024);
  - First goal: Zakaria Naidji (against US Monastir, CAF Champions League, 21 September 2024);
  - Highest attendance in an official match:

== See also ==
- MC Alger in international club football
