= 1975–76 MC Alger season =

MC Alger
1975–76 season
- President: Abdelkader Drif
- Head coach: Hamid Zouba
- Stadium: Stade du 5 Juillet
- National 1: Champion
- Algerian Cup: Winners
- African Cup of Champions: Second round
- Top goalscorer: League: Abdelkader Ait Hamouda (14); All: Abdelkader Ait Hamouda (17)
Home colours

In the 1975–76 season, MC Alger is competing in the National 1 for the 11th season, as well as the Algerian Cup. It is their 8th consecutive season in the top flight of Algerian football. They will be competing in National, the Algerian Cup and the African Cup of Champions. In 1976, MC Alger qualified for the African Cup of Champions Clubs for the first time in its history after winning the 1974–75 Algerian Championnat National. They reached the final after beating Al-Ahly Benghazi of Libya, Al Ahly of Egypt, Luo Union of Kenya and Enugu Rangers of Nigeria, respectively. In the final, they met Guinean club Hafia Conakry, who had won the last edition of the competition. In the first leg in Conakry, MC Alger lost 3–0 and faced the difficult task of having to score three goals in the return leg. However, in the return leg, they managed to score the three goals with a brace from Omar Betrouni and a goal from Zoubir Bachi. They went on to win the penalty shootout 4–1 to win their first African title and also become the first Algerian club to win a continental competition.

== Squad list ==
Players and squad numbers last updated on 18 November 1975.
Note: Flags indicate national team as has been defined under FIFA eligibility rules. Players may hold more than one non-FIFA nationality.

Nat.	Name	Position	Date of Birth (Age)	Signed from
Goalkeepers
(Algeria)	Abdenour Kaoua	GK	14 June 1949 (aged 26)	(Algeria) Youth system
(Algeria)	Mohamed Ait Mouhoub	GK	5 November 1952 (aged 22)	(Algeria) Youth system
(Algeria)	Nacer Ait Mouhoub	GK	1 January 1959 (aged 16)	(Algeria)
Defenders
(Algeria)	Abdenour Zemmour	RB	27 July 1952 (aged 23)	(Algeria) JS El Biar
(Algeria)	Mohamed Azzouz			
(Algeria)	Bouzid Mahiouz		13 January 1952 (aged 23)	(Algeria) Youth system
(Algeria)	Madjid Oudina		20 October 1953 (aged 21)	(Algeria) Youth system
(Algeria)	Abedelaziz Djemâa			
(Algeria)	Abdelouahab Zenir		10 November 1951 (aged 23)	(Algeria) Youth system
(Algeria)	Mohamed Bouzerde			
(Algeria)	Sadek Amrous		29 December 1948 (aged 26)	(France) AS mantaise
Midfielders
(Algeria)	Anwar Bachta		9 May 1948 (aged 27)	(Algeria) OMR El Annasser
(Algeria)	Ali Bencheikh		9 January 1955 (aged 20)	(Algeria) Youth system
(Algeria)	Zoubir Bachi		12 January 1950 (aged 25)	(Algeria) JS El Biar
(Algeria)	Aissa Draoui		30 January 1950 (aged 25)	(Algeria) JSM Skikda
(Algeria)	Lyès Abdi			
(Algeria)	Abdellah Mohamed Réda Bendi			
(Algeria)	Naguib Sellami			
(Algeria)	Mohamed Aizel			
Forwards
(Algeria)	Omar Betrouni		9 January 1949 (aged 26)	(Algeria) Youth system
(Algeria)	Abdeslam Bousri		28 January 1953 (aged 22)	(Algeria) Youth system
(Algeria)	Abdelkader Ait Hamouda		4 September 1951 (aged 24)	(Algeria) RC Kouba
(Algeria)	Abdenour Bellemou			

== Competitions ==
=== Overview ===
Competition	Record								Started round	Final position / round	First match	Last match
Competition	G	W	D	L	GF	GA	GD	Win %	Started round	Final position / round	First match	Last match
National 1	30	18	7	5	63	32	+31	60.00	—	Champion	14 September 1975	4 July 1976
Algerian Cup	7	6	1	0	25	3	+22	85.71	Round of 64	Winners	22 January 1976	19 June 1976
African Cup of Champions	4	2	0	2	8	5	+3	50.00	First round	Second round	30 April 1976	11 June 1976
Total	41	26	8	7	96	40	+56	63.41				

=== Championnat National ===
==== League table ====
Pos	Team	Pld	W	D	L	GF	GA	GD	Pts	Qualification or relegation
1	MC Alger	30	18	7	5	63	32	+31	73	League Champions, qualified for African Cup
2	NA Hussein Dey	30	18	6	6	43	20	+23	72	
3	JS Kawkabi	30	16	7	7	42	23	+19	69	
4	USM Alger	30	14	8	8	52	29	+23	66	
5	ES Sétif	30	12	11	7	55	35	+20	65	

Source: rsssf.com

=== Results by round ===
Round	1	2	3	4	5	6	7	8	9	10	11	12	13	14	15	16	17	18	19	20	21	22	23	24	25	26	27	28	29	30
Ground	A	H	H	A	H	A	H	A	H	A	H	A	H	A	H	H	A	A	H	A	H	A	H	A	H	A	H	A	H	A
Result	L	D	W	D	W	D	D	D	W	D	W	W	W	W	W	W	L	D	W	W	W	L	W	W	L	W	W	L	W	W
Position															1	1														1

Source: Competitive matches
A = Away; H = Home; W = Win; D = Draw; L = Loss

=== Matches ===
Win Draw Loss

14 September 1975 Round 1	Hamra Annaba	2–1	MC Alger	Annaba
	Bourai 87'; Bakhouche 88'		Ait Hamouda 56'	Stadium: Colonel Chabou Abdelkader Stadium; Referee: Benchedad
Note: Lineup for MC Alger - .

21 September 1975 Round 2	MC Alger	1–1	ES Sétif	Algiers
	Bencheikh 88'		Boukherrouba 61'	Stadium: Stade du 5 Juillet; Referee: Mokhfi, Nefoussi, Othmane
Note: Lineup for MC Alger - Kaoua, Zemmour, Azzouz, Djemâa, Zenir (Bouzerde), Mahiouz, Betrouni, Bachi (cap), Ait Hamouda (Bellemou), Bencheikh, Bachta.

28 September 1975 Round 3	MC Alger	4–3	WA Boufarik	Belcourt
	Azzouz 4'; Bachi 67'; Ait Hamouda 73'; Betrouni 83'		Smain 13', 45'; Sahnoun 73'	Stadium: Stade du 20 Août 1955; Referee: Benseddik, Azzouz, Bendekiche
Note: Lineup for MC Alger - Kaoua (Ait Mouhoub 45'), Zemmour (Bachta 45'), Azzouz, Djemâa, Zenir, Mahiouz, Betrouni, Bachi (cap), Ait Hamouda, Bencheikh, Draoui.

5 October 1975 Round 4	CA Batna	2–2	MC Alger	Batna
	Haouzmani 14'; Fatmi 86'		Draoui 41'; Ait Hamouda 47'	Stadium: Mustapha Seffouhi Stadium; Referee: Zeboudj, Tagri, Kaid
Note: Lineup for MC Alger - Ait Mouhoub, Zemmour, Azzouz, Djemâa, Mahiouz, Bachta, Betrouni, Bachi (cap), Ait Hamouda, Bencheikh, Draoui.

12 October 1975 Round 5	MC Alger	5–1	ASM Oran	Algiers
	Bellemou 8'; Draoui 14', 67'; Bachi 49'; Betrouni 74'		Benarba 20'	Stadium: Stade du 5 Juillet; Referee: Benghezal, Charmat, Maameri
Note: Lineup for MC Alger - Ait Mouhoub, Zemmour, Azzouz, Djemâa, Mahiouz, Bencheikh (Abdi), Betrouni, Bachi (cap), Bachta, Draoui, Bellemou (Bousri).

29 October 1975 Round 6	RC Kouba	1–1	MC Alger	Belcourt
	Amirouche 60'		Azzouz 84' (pen.)	Stadium: Stade du 20 Août 1955; Referee: Chihani
Note: Lineup for MC Alger - Kaoua, Zemmour (Bousri), Azzouz, Mahiouz, Zenir, Bachta, Betrouni, Bachi (cap), Ait Hamouda, Bencheikh (Abdi), Draoui.

26 October 1975 Round 7	MC Alger	0–0	NA Hussein Dey	Algiers
				Stadium: Stade du 5 Juillet; Referee: Khellassi
Note: Lineup for MC Alger - Kaoua, Zemmour, Azzouz, Mahiouz, Zenir, Bachta, Betrouni, Bcahi (cap), Bousri (Bellemou), Bencheikh (Abdi), Draoui.

2 November 1975 Round 8	USM Bel Abbès	1–1	MC Alger	Mostaganem
	Chibane 18'		Ait Hamouda 40'	Stadium: Stade Mohamed Benslimane; Referee: Zraikia, Lahmar, Benamghar
Note: Lineup for MC Alger - Kaoua, Zemmour, Azzouz, Mahiouz, Zenir, Bachta, Betrouni, Bachi (cap), Ait Hamouda, Bencheikh, Draoui (Abdi 55').

9 November 1975 Round 9	MC Alger	2–0	MO Constantine	Belcourt
	Ait Hamouda 5', 30'			Stadium: Stade du 20 Août 1955; Referee: Toula, Merrad, Zair
Note: Lineup for MC Alger - Ait Mouhoub, Zemmour, Azzouz, Mahiouz, Zenir, Bachta (Abdi), Betrouni, Bachi (cap), Ait Hamouda, Bencheikh, Draoui.

16 November 1975 Round 10	USM Alger	1–1	MC Alger	Algiers
	Keddou 42'		Azzouz 27' (pen.)	Stadium: Stade du 5 Juillet; Referee: Mohandi
Note: Lineup for MC Alger - Ait Mouhoub, Zemmour, Azzouz, Djemâa, Mahiouz, Bachta, Betrouni, Bachi (cap), Ait Hamouda, Bencheikh, Draoui.

23 November 1975 Round 11	MC Alger	3–0	USM Khenchela	Algiers
	Ait Hamouda 39'; Bousri 56'; Draoui 69'			Stadium: Stade du 5 Juillet; Referee: Senoussi, Slimani, Mokhfi
Note: Lineup for MC Alger - Kaoua, Zemmour, Azzouz, Mahiouz, Bachta, Bencheikh (Aizel Mohamed), Betrouni, Bachi (cap), Bousri, Draoui, Ait Hamouda (Bellemou).

30 November 1975 Round 12	MC Oran	0–1	MC Alger	Oran
			Bachta 53'	Stadium: Stade 19 juin 1965; Referee: Traikia, Chermat, Kezzoula
Note: Lineup for MC Alger - Kaoua, Zemmour, Azzouz, Mahiouz, Zenir, Bencheikh, Betrouni, Bachi (cap), Bousri, Draoui, Ait Hamouda.

7 December 1975 Round 13	MC Alger	3–1	USM Maison Carrée	Algiers
	Bellemou 6', 20'; Zenir 47'		Tahar 85'	Stadium: Stade du 5 Juillet; Referee: Lahmar, Tayeb, Nehaissia
Note: Lineup for MC Alger - Kaoua, Zemmour, Azzouz, Mahiouz, Zenir, Bencheikh (Abdi), Betrouni, Bachi (cap), Bousri (Ait Hamouda), Draoui, Bellemou.

14 December 1975 Round 14	CR Belcourt	4–5	MC Alger	Algiers
	Mokrani 35'; Belbahri 51'; Zenir 79' (o.g.); Madani 89'		Zenir 13'; Bousri 21'; Draoui 29'; Betrouni 55', 84'	Stadium: Stade du 5 Juillet; Attendance: 27,135; Referee: Chihani, Kezzoula, Kermiche
Note: Lineup for MC Alger - Kaoua, Zemmour, Azzouz, Mahiouz, Zenir, Bencheikh, Betrouni, Bachi (cap), Bousri (Sellami), Draoui, Bellemou (Djemâa).

18 January 1976 Round 15	MC Alger	1–0	JS Kawkabi	Algiers
	Azzouz 47' (pen.)			Stadium: Stade du 5 Juillet; Referee: Khelassi, Tayeb, Kezzoula
Note: Lineup for MC Alger - Kaoua, Zemmour, Azzouz, Mahiouz, Zenir, Bencheikh, Betrouni, Bachi (cap), Bousri, Draoui, Bellemou (Ait Hamouda).

25 January 1976 Round 16	MC Alger	1–0	Hamra Annaba	Belcourt
	Ait Hamouda 34'			Stadium: Stade du 20 Août 1955; Referee: Bounaga
Note: Lineup for MC Alger - Ait Mouhoub, Zemmour, Azzouz, Djemâa, Zenir, Bencheikh, Betrouni (cap), Bendi (Sellami), Bousri (Bellemou), Ait Hamouda, Draoui.

8 February 1976 Round 17	ES Sétif	1–0	MC Alger	Sétif
	Salhi Abdelhamid 22'			Stadium: Stade Mohamed Guessab; Referee: Kaid, Zeboudj, Merrad
Note: Lineup for MC Alger - Kaoua, Abdi (Aizel Mohamed), Zemmour, Djemâa, Mahiouz, Sellami, Betrouni, Bachi (cap), Bousri, Draoui, Bendi (Bellemou).

22 February 1976 Round 18	WA Boufarik	1–1	MC Alger	Boufarik
	Selmi 81'		Bachi 1'	Stadium: Stade Mohamed Reggaz; Referee: Bencheddad
Note: Lineup for MC Alger - Ait Mouhoub, Oudina, Zemmour, Djemâa, Mahiouz, Bencheikh, Betrouni, Bachi (cap), Bousri, Draoui, Bellemou.

29 February 1976 Round 19	MC Alger	4–2	CA Batna	Algiers
	Draoui 35'; Ait Hamouda 54'; Bachi 81'; Bousri 84'		Reddah 28'; Haouzmani 71'	Stadium: Stade du 5 Juillet; Referee: Bendjahene, Lacarne, Senoussi
Note: Lineup for MC Alger - Kaoua, Zemmour, Azzouz, Mahiouz (Djemâa), Bachta, Bencheikh, Betrouni, Bachi (cap), Bousri, Draoui, Ait Hamouda (Bendi).

14 March 1976 Round 20	ASM Oran	1–2	MC Alger	Oran
	Guemri 31'		Djemâa 60'; Ait Hamouda 84'	Stadium: Stade 19 juin 1965; Referee: Benaboud, Aliane, Traikia
Note: Lineup for MC Alger - Ait Mouhoub, Zemmour, Azzouz, Mahiouz, Djemâa, Bencheikh, Betrouni, Bachi (cap), Ait Hamouda, Sellami (Bendi), Bellemou (Bachta).

21 March 1976 Round 21	MC Alger	1–0	RC Kouba	Algiers
	Ait Hamouda 31'			Stadium: Stade du 5 Juillet; Referee: Tayeb, Lahmar, Chermat
Note: Lineup for MC Alger - Kaoua Abdenour, Zemmour, Azzouz, Mahiouz, Bachta, Bencheikh, Betrouni, Bachi (cap), Ait Hamouda (Bousri), Draoui - Bellemou.

28 March 1976 Round 22	NA Hussein Dey	1–0	MC Alger	Algiers
	Benalouane 62'			Stadium: Stade du 5 Juillet; Referee: Benghezal
Note: Lineup for MC Alger - Kaoua, Zemmour, Azzouz, Mahiouz, Bachta, Bencheikh, Betrouni, Bachi (cap), Ait Hamouda (Bendi), Draoui, Bellemou (Sellami).

11 April 1976 Round 23	MC Alger	7–3	USM Bel Abbès	Belcourt
	Azzouz 14' (pen.); Bachi 17', 77'; Ait Hamouda 23'; Bencheikh 75'; Betrouni 58', 90'		Bakouche 7'; Abdi Fodil 49'; Bachta 70' (o.g.)	Stadium: Stade du 20 Août 1955; Referee: Lahmar, Traikia, Aliane
Note: Lineup for MC Alger - Kaoua, Zemmour, Azzouz, Amrous, Mahiouz, Bencheikh, Betrouni, Bachi (cap), Ait Hamouda (Bousri 46'), Draoui, Sellami (Bachta 46').

9 May 1976 Round 24	MO Constantine	0–3	MC Alger	Constantine
			Bencheikh 44'; Ait Hamouda 70'; Bachi 80'	Stadium: Stade du 17 Juin; Referee: Bencheddad, Toula, Senoussi
Note: Lineup for MC Alger - Ait Mouhoub (Kaoua), Zemmour, Azzouz, Oudina, Mahiouz, Bencheikh, Bendi, Bachi (cap), Ait Hamouda, Bousri, Sellami (Bellemou).

16 May 1976 Round 25	MC Alger	0–1	USM Alger	Algiers
			Guedioura 74'	Stadium: Stade du 5 Juillet; Referee: Kaid
Note: Lineup for MC Alger - Ait Mouhoub, Zemmour, Azzouz, Bachta (Oudina), Mahiouz, Bencheikh, Betrouni, Bachi (cap), Bousri, Draoui, Bendi (Ait Hamouda).

23 May 1976 Round 26	USM Khenchela	0–3	MC Alger	Khenchela
			Bachi 52', 54'; Oudina 72'	Stadium: Stade Hamam Amar; Referee: Bounaga, Benyakoub, Nefoussi
Note: Lineup for MC Alger - Kaoua, Zemmour, Azzouz, Oudina, Mahiouz, Abdi, Bendi, Bachi (cap), Bousri, Bencheikh, Ait Hamouda.

1 June 1976 Round 27	MC Alger	3–2	MC Oran	Belcourt
	Ait Hamouda 43'; Bousri 60', 68'		Medjahed 44'; Belkedrouci 73'	Stadium: Stade du 20 Août 1955; Referee: ?
Note: Lineup for MC Alger - Kaoua, Oudina, Azzouz, Mahiouz, Bencheikh, Draoui, Ait Hamouda, Bellemou, Bousri, Betrouni.

6 June 1976 Round 28	USM Maison Carrée	2–1	MC Alger	Algiers
	Selmi 12' (pen.); Karoui 35'		Draoui 42'	Stadium: Stade du 5 Juillet; Referee: Chihani
Note: Lineup for MC Alger - Ait Mouhou, Zemmour, Azzouz, Oudina, Mahiouz, Bencheikh, Betrouni, Bachi (cap), Bousri, Draoui, Bachta (Ait Hamouda).

29 June 1976 Round 29	MC Alger	3–0	CR Belcourt	Algiers
	Mahiouz 21'; Bousri 74'; Bachi 83'			Stadium: Stade du 5 Juillet; Referee: Benghezal, Kermiche, Traikia
Note: Lineup for MC Alger - Kaoua, Zemmour, Amrous, Mahiouz, Azzouz, Bencheikh, Betrouni (cap), Bachta, Bousri, Draoui, Bellemou (Ait Hamouda).

4 July 1976 Round 30	JS Kawkabi	2–3	MC Alger	Tizi Ouzou
	Aouis 10'; Barris 70'		Bellemou 50'; Bachi 65'; Bousri 75'	Stadium: Stade Oukil Ramdane; Referee: Bounaga, Othmane, Bendjahene
Note: Lineup for MC Alger - Kaoua, Zemmour, Bachta, Mahiouz, Azzouz, Bencheikh, Betrouni, Bachi (cap), Bousri, Draoui (Oudina), Bellemou.

=== Algerian Cup ===
On June 19, 1976, under a blazing sun and suffocating heat, Mouloudia of Algiers began the harvest series by winning its 3rd Algerian Cup by beating MO Constantine in the final. The Match, without reaching a great technical level, was folded in ten minutes thanks to two lightning goals from Bellemou and Bencheikh. The green and red left no room for suspense with this resounding entry into the match. In the second minute of the game, Bellemou was already receiving a cross from his left to forestall the exit of the Constantinois goalkeeper Naïdja and put the ball in the back of the net. 8 minutes later, the virulent right winger of Mouloudia, Omar Betrouni obtains a free kick at the edge of the 25 meters of the goalkeeper Mociste's cage, Ali Bencheikh took charge of executing it to lodge the leather in the back of the net of the unfortunate Naidja. The series of consecrations was well underway. MC Alger won its third Algerian Cup after those of 1971 and 1973.

22 January 1976 Round of 64	MC Alger	2–0	USM Maison Carrée	Algiers
	Bousri 5'; Bencheikh 67'			Stadium: Stade du 5 Juillet; Referee: Benganif
Note: Lineup for MC Alger - Kaoua, Zemmour, Azzouz, Djemâa, Zenir, Bencheikh, Betrouni (cap), Mahiouz, Bousri, Draoui, Bellemou.

1 February 1976 Round of 32	MC Alger	8–1	ES Souk Ahras	Constantine
	Bousri 9', 21'; Draoui 15', 80'; Bachi 19'; Bencheikh 30'; Zenir 75'; Bellemou 77'		Ababsia 62'	Stadium: Stade du 17 Juin; Referee: Bencheddad, Slimani, Mokhfi
Note: Lineup for MC Alger - Ait Mouhoub, Zemmour, Azzouz, Mahiouz, Zenir, Bencheikh, Betrouni, Bachi (cap), Bousri, Draoui, Bellemou.

15 February 1976 Round of 16	MC Alger	2–0	Entente de Collo	Algiers
	Betrouni 7'; Bellemou 19'			Stadium: Stade d'El Anasser; Referee: Mihoub, Meddour, Toula
Note: Lineup for MC Alger - Ait Mouhoub, Sellami, Zemmour, Djemâa, Mahiouz, Abdi, Betrouni, Bachi (cap), Bousri, Draoui, Bellemou (Bendi).

7 March 1976 Quarter-finals	MC Alger	1–1 (a.e.t.)	NA Hussein Dey	Algiers
	Ait Hamouda 92'		Zarabi 112'	Stadium: Stade du 5 Juillet; Referee: Bounaga
Note: Lineup for MC Alger - Ait Mouhoub, Zemmour, Azzouz, Mahiouz, Djemâa, Bencheikh, Betrouni (cap), Bachta (Sellami), Bousri (Ait Hamouda), Draoui, Bellemou.

4 April 1976 SF 1st leg	SA Mohammadia	1–3	MC Alger	Oran
	Benfetta 13'		Bachi 16'; Betrouni 87'; Ait Hamouda 90'	Stadium: Stade 19 juin 1965; Referee: Chihani, Kermiche, Benaboud
Note: Lineup for MC Alger - Kaoua, Zemmour-, Azzouz, Amrous, Mahiouz, Bencheikh, Betrouni, Bachi (cap), Ait Hamouda, Draoui, Bachta (Sellami 80').

25 April 1976 SF 2nd leg	MC Alger	7–0	SA Mohammadia	Algiers
	Bachi 18'; Bencheikh 19', 49'; Azzouz 21' (pen.); Bousri 30'; Mahiouz 60'; Bellemou 62'			Stadium: Stade d'El Anasser; Referee: Benghezal
Note: Lineup for MC Alger - Ait Mouhoub (Kaoua), Zemmour, Azzouz, Oudina, Mahiouz, Bencheikh, Bendi, Bachi (cap), Ait Hamouda, Bousri, Sellami (Bellemou).

19 June 1976 Final	MC Alger	2–0	MO Constantine	Algiers
20:00	Bellemou 2'; Bencheikh 10'			Stadium: Stade du 5 Juillet; Referee: Aouissi, Benghezal, Benganif
Note: Lineup for MC Alger - Kaoua, Zemmour, Bachta (Amrous Sadek), Mahiouz, Azzouz, Bencheikh, Betrouni, Bachi (cap), Bousri, Draoui, Bellemou (Ait Hamouda 86').

=== Maghreb Champions Cup ===
17 October 1975 Semi-Finals	Espérance de Tunis (Tunisia)	0–1	(Algeria) MC Alger	Tunis
			Bachi 54'	Stadium: Stade El Menzah; Referee: Larrache, Louazel, Bahar (Morocco)
Note: Lineup for MC Alger - Kaoua, Zemmour, Azzouz, Djemâa, Zenir, Mahiouz, Betrouni, Bachi, Ait Hamouda (Aizel), Bachta, Draoui.

19 October 1975 Final	Club Africain (Tunisia)	0–0 (4–2 p)	(Algeria) MC Alger	Tunis
				Stadium: Stade El Menzah; Referee: Larrache, Louazel, Bahar (Morocco)
Note: Lineup for MC Alger - Kaoua, Zemmour, Azzouz, Djemâa (Bendi), Zenir, Bencheikh, Betrouni, Bachi, Bousri (Ait Hamouda), Bachta, Draoui.

=== African Cup of Champions Clubs ===
==== First round ====
30 April 1976 First leg	Al-Ahly Benghazi (Libya)	3–2	(Algeria) MC Alger	Benghazi
			Ait Hamouda ?'; Betrouni ?'	Stadium: March 28 Stadium
Note: Lineup for MC Alger - Kaoua (Ait Mouhoub), Zemmour, Azzouz, Amrous, Mahiouz, Bachta, Betrouni, Bachi (cap), Ait Hamouda, Bencheikh, Draoui.

13 May 1976 Second leg	MC Alger (Algeria)	3–1	(Libya) Al-Ahly Benghazi	Algiers
	Azzouz 13'; Bendi 68'; Bachi 72'		Bensouid 32'	Stadium: Stade du 5 Juillet; Referee: Taoufik Ghazaya (Tunisia)
Note: Lineup for MC Alger - Kaoua (Ait Mouhoub), Zemmour, Azzouz, Mahiouz, Bachta, Bencheikh, Betrouni, Bachi (cap), Bousri, Draoui, Ait Hamouda (Bendi).

==== Second round ====
29 May 1976 First leg	MC Alger (Algeria)	3–0	(Egypt) Al Ahly	Algiers
	Azzouz 25' (pen.); Bousri 34'; Bachi 70'			Stadium: Stade du 5 Juillet; Referee: Ali Dridi (Tunisia)
Note: Lineup for MC Alger - Kaoua, Zemmour, Azzouz, Mahiouz, Zenir, Bencheikh, Betrouni (Bellemou), Bachi (cap), Bousri, Bachta, Draoui.

11 June 1976 Second leg	Al Ahly (Egypt)	1–0	(Algeria) MC Alger	Cairo
	El Khatib 64' (pen.)			Stadium: Nasser Stadium; Referee: Kamel Ismail (Ethiopia)
Note: Lineup for MC Alger - Kaoua, Zemmour, Azzouz, Mahiouz (Amrous 75'), Zenir, Bachta, Betrouni, Bachi (cap) (Ait Hamouda 65'), Bousri, Bencheikh, Draoui.

== Squad information ==
=== Appearances and goals ===
No.	Pos	Nat	Player	Total		National 1		Algerian Cup		Cup of Champions	
No.	Pos	Nat	Player	Apps	Goals	Apps	Goals	Apps	Goals	Apps	Goals
Goalkeepers
	GK	(Algeria) ALG	Abdenour Kaoua	28	0	19+1	0	3+1	0	4	0
	GK	(Algeria) ALG	Mohamed Ait Mouhoub	17	0	10+1	0	4	0	0+2	0
	GK	(Algeria) ALG	Nacer Ait Mouhoub	0	0	0	0	0	0	0	0
Defenders
	DF	(Algeria) ALG	Abdenour Zemmour	39	0	28	0	7	0	4	0
	DF	(Algeria) ALG	Mohamed Azzouz	37	8	27	5	6	1	4	2
	DF	(Algeria) ALG	Bouzid Mahiouz	39	2	28	1	7	1	4	0
	DF	(Algeria) ALG	Madjid Oudina	8	1	5+2	1	1	0	0	0
	DF	(Algeria) ALG	Abedelaziz Djemâa	14	1	9+2	1	3	0	0	0
	DF	(Algeria) ALG	Abdelouahab Zenir	15	3	11	2	2	1	2	0
	DF	(Algeria) ALG	Mohamed Bouzerde	1	0	0+1	0	0	0	0	0
	DF	(Algeria) ALG	Sadek Amrous	6	0	2	0	1+1	0	1+1	0
Midfielders
	MF	(Algeria) ALG	Anwar Bachta	26	1	17+2	1	3	0	4	0
	MF	(Algeria) ALG	Ali Bencheikh	38	8	28	3	6	5	4	0
	MF	(Algeria) ALG	Zoubir Bachi	35	16	26	11	5	3	4	2
	MF	(Algeria) ALG	Aissa Draoui	35	9	25	7	6	2	4	0
	MF	(Algeria) ALG	Lyès Abdi	9	0	2+6	0	1	0	0	0
	MF	(Algeria) ALG	Abdellah Mohamed Réda Bendi	11	1	6+2	0	1+1	0	0+1	1
	MF	(Algeria) ALG	Naguib Sellami	11	0	4+3	0	3+1	0	0	0
	MF	(Algeria) ALG	Mohamed Aizel	2	0	0+2	0	0	0	0	0
Forwards
	FW	(Algeria) ALG	Omar Betrouni	37	9	27	6	6	2	4	1
	FW	(Algeria) ALG	Abdeslam Bousri	30	12	17+4	7	6	4	3	1
	FW	(Algeria) ALG	Abdelkader Ait Hamouda	30	16	18+5	13	1+3	2	2+1	1
	FW	(Algeria) ALG	Abdenour Bellemou	24	8	11+6	4	5+1	4	0+1	0
Players transferred out during the season

Source: Competitions

=== Goalscorers ===
Includes all competitive matches. The list is sorted alphabetically by surname when total goals are equal.

Nat.	Player	Pos.	N 1	AC	CL 1	TOTAL
(Algeria)	Abdelkader Ait Hamouda	FW	14	2	1	17
(Algeria)	Zoubir Bachi	MF	11	3	2	16
(Algeria)	Abdeslam Bousri	FW	7	4	1	12
(Algeria)	Omar Betrouni	FW	6	2	1	9
(Algeria)	Aissa Draoui	MF	7	2	0	9
(Algeria)	Ali Bencheikh	MF	3	5	0	8
(Algeria)	Abdenour Bellemou	FW	4	4	0	8
(Algeria)	Mohamed Azzouz	DF	5	1	2	8
(Algeria)	Abdelouahab Zenir	DF	2	1	0	3
(Algeria)	Bouzid Mahiouz	DF	1	1	0	2
(Algeria)	Madjid Oudina	DF	1	0	0	1
(Algeria)	Abedelaziz Djemâa	DF	1	0	0	1
(Algeria)	Anwar Bachta	MF	1	0	0	1
(Algeria)	Abdellah Mohamed Réda Bendi	MF	0	0	1	1
Own Goals			0	0	0	0
Totals			63	25	8	96
