= MC Alger in African football =

- Club: MC Alger
- Most appearances: Abderahmane Hachoud 30
- Top scorer: Hichem Nekkache 11
- First entry: 1976 African Cup of Champions Clubs
- Latest entry: 2025–26 CAF Champions League

Titles
- Champions League: 1: 1976

MC Alger, an Algerian professional association football club, has gained entry to Confederation of African Football (CAF) competitions on several occasions. They have represented Algeria in the Champions League on seven occasions, the Confederation Cup on four occasions, the now-defunct Cup Winners' Cup only one occasion.

== History ==
MC Alger whose team has regularly taken part in Confederation of African Football (CAF) competitions. Qualification for Algerian clubs is determined by a team's performance in its domestic league and cup competitions, MC Alger have regularly qualified for the primary African competition, the former African Cup of Champions Clubs and CAF Champions League, by winning the Ligue Professionnelle 1. MC Alger have also achieved African qualification via the Algerian Cup and have played in the former African Cup Winners' Cup and CAF Confederation Cup. The first match was against Al-Ahly Benghazi in the African Cup of Champions Clubs, where they were defeated 3–2 and the first goal was scored by Abdelkader Aït Hamouda. On February 21, 2018, Mouloudia witnessed the heaviest victory against AS Otôho in the CAF Champions League with a score of 9–0. In the same match, Hichem Nekkache scored the first hat-trick by a player for Mouloudia in continental competitions. On March 6, 2021, MC Alger won in Thiès against Teungueth, putting an end to four decades of drought outside their lands, as the last away success in African competition dates back to 1979.

=== Historical treble ===
The first African title in the history of Algerian football became reality at the very first attempt for MC Alger. The idea of conquering Africa emerged immediately after the club’s final match in the Maghreb Champions Cup against Club Africain in Tunisia. Discussions quickly began between Abdelkader Drif, then president of the MCA football section, and the country’s sports authorities. Once an agreement was reached, the club initiated procedures with the CAF to secure the participation of the Algerian champions in the African competition.

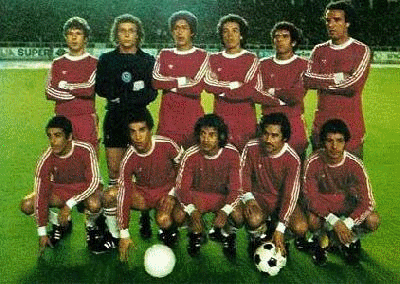
Team that achieved the first continental title in the history of Algeria in 1976.

Mouloudia’s adventure in the 12th edition of the African Cup of Champions Clubs began in Benghazi with a narrow 3–2 defeat before a difficult but decisive 3–1 victory at Stade du 5 Juillet on May 13, 1976. After surviving the first round, MCA faced the famous Egyptian giants Al Ahly, who were also making their first appearance in the competition. Led by the brilliant Ali Bencheikh, the Mouloudéens produced a magnificent performance and won 3–0 in Algiers on May 29, 1976. The return leg in Cairo on June 11 ended in a victory for Al Ahly, but MCA still progressed to the next round.

In the quarter-finals, played during the month of Ramadan on September 10, 1976, MCA faced Kenyan side Luo Union and recorded an impressive 6–3 victory in the first leg. The second leg in Mombasa proved a mere formality. In the semi-finals, Mouloudia met the formidable Enugu Rangers, finalists of the 1975 edition. After losing 2–0 in Nigeria, MCA produced one of the greatest comebacks in Algerian football history. Following a tense first half in Algiers, the teammates of Omar Betrouni displayed remarkable determination and overturned the deficit with a memorable 3–0 victory, securing qualification for the final.

The first leg of the final, played in Conakry on December 5, 1976, against Hafia FC turned into a nightmare for the Algerian side. In a hostile atmosphere, MCA suffered a heavy defeat that seriously threatened their hopes of lifting the trophy. However, on December 18, 1976, at Stade du 5 Juillet in the presence of President Houari Boumediene, the dream finally became reality. Mouloudia defeated the Guinean champions 3–0 before prevailing 4–1 on penalties to capture the 12th edition of the African Cup of champion clubs and become the first Algerian club to win a continental title. As a reward for this historic achievement, President Boumediene offered each player the keys to a Fiat 128.

Abdennour Kaoua, Mohamed Ait Mouhoub, Abdenour Zemmour, Sadek Amrous, Bouzid Mahiouz, Mohamed Azzouz, Abdelwahab Zenir, Anouar Bachta, Ali Bencheikh, Omar Betrouni, Zoubir Bachi, Aïssa Draoui, Abdenour Bellemou, Abdelkader Aït Hamouda, Madjid Oudina, Bendi Abdellah Mohamed Réda, Braham Attar, Nacer Achari.

— List of African Cup of champion clubs

=== Kwara United affair ===
After seven years of absence, MC Alger returned to continental participation through the CAF Confederation Cup portal and were surprisingly eliminated in the first round against Kwara United. More than a month after the first leg, the Disciplinary Committee of the Confederation of African Football, ruled to impose a very severe penalty on the MC Alger, namely the suspension of Merouane Abdouni for 3 years, Kamel Bouacida for 18 months for all continental competitions and a fine of 20 thousand dollars. The first, for “physical aggression, violent conduct and threats towards the refereeing body” and the second, for “physical aggression towards the referee”, according to the findings of the said commission.

CAF does not stop there since it informs FIFA of the sanctions imposed on Abdouni and Bouacida with the prospect of possibly extending them to the international and national level. For their part, Réda Babouche, Smaïl Chaoui and Fodil Hadjadj each received two match suspensions for violent conduct and threatening the match referee. And to drive the point home, the president of the football section Khaled Adnane is suspended for six months for having returned to the playing area, despite his expulsion, to threaten the referee and make insulting remarks towards him.

== CAF competitions ==
MC Alger results in CAF competition
Season	Competition	Round	Club	Home	Away	Aggregate
1976	Cup of Champions Clubs	First round	(Libya) Al-Ahly Benghazi	3–1	2–3	5–4
1976	Cup of Champions Clubs	Second round	(Egypt) Al Ahly SC	3–0	0–1	3–1
1976	Cup of Champions Clubs	Quarter-Finals	(Kenya) Luo Union	6–3	1–0	7–3
1976	Cup of Champions Clubs	Semi-Finals	(Nigeria) Enugu Rangers	3–0	0–2	3–2
1976	Cup of Champions Clubs	Final	(Guinea) Hafia FC	3–0	0–3	3–3 (4–1 p)
1977	Cup of Champions Clubs	Second round	(Uganda) Kampala City Council FC	3–2	1–1	4–3
1977	Cup of Champions Clubs	Quarter-Finals	(Zambia) Mufulira Wanderers	2–1	0–2	2–3
1979	Cup of Champions Clubs	First round	(Libya) Al-Ahly	2–0	2–1	4–1
1979	Cup of Champions Clubs	Second round	(Cameroon) Union Douala	2–0	0–2	2–2 (1–2 p)
1980	Cup of Champions Clubs	First round	(Benin) Dragons de l'Ouémé	3–0	0–0	3–0
1980	Cup of Champions Clubs	Second round	(Ivory Coast) Stella Club d'Adjamé	3–1	2–4	5–5 (a)
1980	Cup of Champions Clubs	Quarter-Finals	(Cameroon) Canon Yaoundé	3–1	0–2	3–3 (a)
1984	Cup Winners' Cup	First round	(Republic of Upper Volta) Racing Club de Bobo	4–0	0–2	4–2
1984	Cup Winners' Cup	Second round	(Egypt) Al Ahly SC	1–0	1–3	2–3
2000	Champions League	First round	(Senegal) ASC Jeanne d'Arc	1–1	1–5	2–6
2007	Confederation Cup	First round	(Nigeria) Kwara United	3–0	0–3	3–3 (3–4 p)
2008	Confederation Cup	First round	(Egypt) Haras El Hodood	0–0	0–1	0–1
2011	Champions League	Preliminary Round	(Central African Republic) Olympic Real de Bangui	2–0	1–1	3–1
2011	Champions League	First round	(Zimbabwe) Dynamos	3–0	1–4	4–4 (a)
2011	Champions League	Second round	(Angola) Inter Luanda	3–2	1–1	4–3
2011	Champions League	Group stage (B)	(Tunisia) Espérance ST	1–1	0–4	4th place
2011	Champions League	Group stage (B)	(Morocco) Wydad Casablanca	3–1	0–4	4th place
2011	Champions League	Group stage (B)	(Egypt) Al-Ahly SC	0–0	0–2	4th place
2015	Confederation Cup	First round	(Niger) Sahel SC	0–0	0–2	0–2
2017	Confederation Cup	Preliminary round	(Ghana) Bechem United	4–1	1–2	5–3
2017	Confederation Cup	First round	(Democratic Republic of the Congo) Renaissance du Congo	2–0	1–2	3–2
2017	Confederation Cup	Play-off round	(Tanzania) Young Africans	4–0	0–1	4–1
2017	Confederation Cup	Group stage (B)	(South Africa) Platinum Stars	2–0	1–1	2nd place
2017	Confederation Cup	Group stage (B)	(Tunisia) CS Sfaxien	2–1	0–4	2nd place
2017	Confederation Cup	Group stage (B)	(Eswatini) Mbabane Swallows	2–1	0–0	2nd place
2017	Confederation Cup	Quarter-finals	(Tunisia) Club Africain	1–0	0–2	1–2
2018	Champions League	Preliminary Round	(Republic of the Congo) AS Otôho	9–0	0–2	9–2
2018	Champions League	First round	(Nigeria) Mountain FM	6–0	1–2	7–2
2018	Champions League	Group stage (B)	(Morocco) Difaâ El Jadidi	1–1	0–2	4th place
2018	Champions League	Group stage (B)	(Algeria) ES Sétif	1–2	1–0	4th place
2018	Champions League	Group stage (B)	(Democratic Republic of the Congo) TP Mazembe	1–1	0–1	4th place
2020–21	Champions League	Preliminary Round	(Benin) Buffles du Borgou	5–1	1–1	6–2
2020–21	Champions League	First round	(Tunisia) CS Sfaxien	2–0	0–1	2–1
2020–21	Champions League	Group stage	(Egypt) Zamalek	0–2	0–0	2nd place
2020–21	Champions League	Group stage	(Tunisia) Espérance de Tunis	1–1	1–1	2nd place
2020–21	Champions League	Group stage	(Senegal) Teungueth	1–0	1–0	2nd place
2020–21	Champions League	Quarter-finals	(Morocco) Wydad Casablanca	1–1	0–1	1–2
2024–25	Champions League	First round	(Liberia) Watanga	2–0	2–0 (Note: MC Alger announced that the first leg match against Watanga played at Nelson Mandela Stadium in Algiers, after the agreement between the two sides.)	4–0
2024–25	Champions League	Second round	(Tunisia) US Monastir	2–0	0–1	2–1
2024–25	Champions League	Group stage	(Democratic Republic of the Congo) TP Mazembe	1–0	0–0	2nd place
2024–25	Champions League	Group stage	(Tanzania) Young Africans	2–0	0–0	2nd place
2024–25	Champions League	Group stage	(Sudan) Al Hilal	0–1	1–1	2nd place
2024–25	Champions League	Quarter-Finals	(South Africa) Orlando Pirates	0–1	0–0	0–1
2025–26	Champions League	First round	(Liberia) FC Fassell	3–0	0–0	3–0
2025–26	Champions League	Second round	(Cameroon) Colombe Sportive	0–0	1–1	1–1 (a)
2025–26	Champions League	Group stage	(South Africa) Mamelodi Sundowns FC	0–0	0–2	3rd place
2025–26	Champions League	Group stage	(Democratic Republic of the Congo) FC Saint-Éloi Lupopo	2–0	0–1	3rd place
2025–26	Champions League	Group stage	(Sudan) Al Hilal	2–1	1–2	3rd place
2026–27	Champions League	First round	(Niger) ASN Nigelec	5–0	0–0	5–0
2026–27	Champions League	Second round	(Nigeria) Enugu Rangers	3–0	0–2	3–2
2026–27	Champions League	Group stage	(Egypt) Zamalek			place
2026–27	Champions League	Group stage	(Tunisia) Club Africain			place
2026–27	Champions League	Group stage	(Tanzania) Young Africans			place

== Non-CAF competitions ==
Arab Competitions

Season	Competition	Round	Club	Home	Away	Aggregate
2004–05	Arab Champions League	Round of 32	(Bahrain) Al-Muharraq SC	2–2	1–0	3–2
2004–05	Arab Champions League	Group stage (A)	(Tunisia) CS Sfaxien	2–1	0–4	2nd place
2004–05	Arab Champions League	Group stage (A)	(Egypt) Zamalek SC	0–0	0–5	2nd place
2004–05	Arab Champions League	Group stage (A)	Kuwait SC	3–2	1–0	2nd place
2004–05	Arab Champions League	Quarter-Finals	(Saudi Arabia) Al Ittihad Djeddah	1–0	0–1	1–1 (4–5 p)
2005–06	Arab Champions League	Round 32	(Sudan) Al-Merreikh	2–0	0–1	2–1
2005–06	Arab Champions League	Round 16	(Iraq) Al-Zawraa	3–0	3–1	6–1
2005–06	Arab Champions League	Quarter finals	(Egypt) ENPPI Club	1–3	2–1	3–4
2006–07	Arab Champions League	Round 32	(Yemen) Al-Tilal Aden	2–1	0–0	2–1
2006–07	Arab Champions League	Round 16	(Saudi Arabia) Al-Nassr	2–2	1–2	3–4
2018–19	Arab Champions League	Round 32	(Bahrain) Al-Riffa SC	2–1	0–0	2–1
2018–19	Arab Champions League	Round 16	(Saudi Arabia) Al-Nassr	2–1	1–0	3–1
2018–19	Arab Champions League	Quarter finals	(Sudan) Al-Merrikh SC	0–0	0–3	0–3
2019–20	Arab Champions League	Round 32	(Oman) Dhofar	1–0	1–1	2–1
2019–20	Arab Champions League	Round 16	(Iraq) Al-Quwa Al-Jawiya	0–0	0–0	0–0 (4-2)
2019–20	Arab Champions League	Quarter finals	(Morocco) Raja CA	1–2	1–0	2–2 a

(North-african / Maghreb) Competitions

Season	Competition	Round	Club	Home	Away	Aggregate
1971-72	Maghreb Cup Winners Cup	semi-finals	(Tunisia) ES Tunis	3–0		
1971-72	Maghreb Cup Winners Cup	final	(Tunisia) Club Africain	1–0		
1972-73	Maghreb Cup Winners Cup	semi-finals	(Morocco) SCC Mohammédia	1–2		
1972-73	Maghreb Cup Winners Cup	3 rd place	(Algeria) HAMRA Annaba	3–0		
1973-74	Maghreb Cup Winners Cup	semi-finals	(Morocco) SCC Mohammédia	3–1		
1973-74	Maghreb Cup Winners Cup	final	(Morocco) Fath Union Sport	1–1		4-2 p
1974-75	Maghreb Cup Winners Cup	semi-finals	(Tunisia) Es Sahel	1–4		
1974-75	Maghreb Cup Winners Cup	3 rd place	(Algeria) MO Constantine			
1975-76	Maghreb Champions Cup	semi-finals	(Tunisia) ES Tunis	1–0		
1975-76	Maghreb Champions Cup	final	(Tunisia) Club Africain	0–0		2-4 p
2010	North African Cup of Champions	semi-finals	(Libya) Ittihad Tripoli	1–0	0–0	1–0
2010	North African Cup of Champions	final	(Tunisia) Club Africain	1–1	0-2	1–3

== Statistics by country ==
Statistics correct as of game against Enugu on october 25, 2026

=== CAF competitions ===
Country	Club	P	W	D	L	GF	GA	GD
Algeria	ES Sétif	2	1	0	1	2	2	+0
Subtotal		2	1	0	1	2	2	+0
Angola	Inter Luanda	2	1	1	0	4	3	+1
Subtotal		2	1	1	0	4	3	+1
Benin	Dragons de l'Ouémé	2	1	1	0	3	0	+3
Benin	Buffles du Borgou	2	1	1	0	6	2	+4
Subtotal		4	2	2	0	9	2	+7
Burkina Faso	Racing Club de Bobo	2	1	0	1	4	2	+2
Subtotal		2	1	0	1	4	2	+2
Cameroon	Union Douala	2	1	0	1	2	2	+0
Cameroon	Canon Yaoundé	2	1	0	1	3	3	+0
Cameroon	Colombe Sportive	2	0	2	0	1	1	+0
Subtotal		6	2	2	2	6	6	+0
Republic of the Congo	AS Otôho	2	1	0	1	9	2	+7
Subtotal		2	1	0	1	9	2	+7
Central African Republic	Olympic Real de Bangui	2	1	1	0	3	1	+2
Subtotal		2	1	1	0	3	1	+2
Democratic Republic of the Congo	Renaissance du Congo	2	1	0	1	3	2	+1
Democratic Republic of the Congo	TP Mazembe	4	1	2	1	2	2	+0
Democratic Republic of the Congo	FC Saint-Éloi Lupopo	2	1	0	1	2	1	+1
Subtotal		8	3	2	3	7	5	+2
Egypt	Al Ahly SC	6	2	1	3	5	6	−1
Egypt	Haras El Hodood	2	0	1	1	0	1	−1
Egypt	Zamalek	2	0	1	1	0	2	−2
Subtotal		10	2	3	5	5	9	−4
Ghana	Bechem United	2	1	0	1	5	3	+2
Subtotal		2	1	0	1	5	3	+2
Guinea	Hafia FC	2	1	0	1	3	3	+0
Subtotal		2	1	0	1	3	3	+0
Ivory Coast	Stella Club d'Adjamé	2	1	0	1	5	5	+0
Subtotal		2	1	0	1	5	5	+0
Kenya	Luo Union	2	2	0	0	7	3	+4
Subtotal		2	2	0	0	7	3	+4
Liberia	Watanga FC	2	2	0	0	4	0	+4
Liberia	FC Fassell	2	1	1	0	3	0	+3
Subtotal		4	3	1	0	7	0	+7
Libya	Al-Ahly Benghazi	2	1	0	1	5	4	+1
Libya	Al-Ahly Tripoli	2	2	0	0	4	1	+3
Subtotal		4	3	0	1	9	5	+4
Morocco	Wydad Casablanca	4	1	1	2	4	7	−3
Morocco	Difaâ El Jadidi	2	0	1	1	1	3	−2
Subtotal		6	1	2	3	5	10	−5
Niger	Sahel SC	2	0	1	1	0	2	−2
Niger	ASN Nigelec	2	1	1	0	5	0	+5
Subtotal		4	1	2	1	5	2	+3
Nigeria	Enugu Rangers	4	2	0	2	6	4	+2
Nigeria	Kwara United	2	1	0	1	3	3	0
Nigeria	Mountain FM	2	1	0	1	7	2	+5
Subtotal		8	4	0	4	16	9	+7
Senegal	ASC Jeanne d'Arc	2	0	1	1	2	6	−4
Senegal	Teungueth	2	2	0	0	2	0	+2
Subtotal		4	2	1	1	4	6	−2
South Africa	Platinum Stars	2	1	1	0	3	1	+2
South Africa	Orlando Pirates	2	0	1	1	0	1	-1
South Africa	Mamelodi Sundowns FC	1	0	1	1	0	2	−2
Subtotal		6	1	3	2	3	4	−1
(Eswatini) Swaziland	Mbabane Swallows	2	1	1	0	2	1	+1
Subtotal		2	1	1	0	2	1	+1
Sudan	Al Hilal	4	1	1	2	4	5	−1
Subtotal		4	1	1	2	4	5	−1
Tanzania	Young Africans	4	2	1	1	6	1	+5
Subtotal		4	2	1	1	6	1	+5
Tunisia	Espérance ST	4	0	3	1	3	7	−4
Tunisia	CS Sfaxien	4	2	0	2	4	6	−2
Tunisia	Club Africain	2	1	0	1	1	2	−1
Tunisia	US Monastir	2	1	0	1	2	1	+1
Subtotal		12	4	3	5	10	16	−6
Uganda	Kampala City Council	2	1	1	0	4	3	+1
Subtotal		2	1	1	0	4	3	+1
Zambia	Mufulira Wanderers	2	1	0	1	2	3	−1
Subtotal		2	1	0	1	2	3	−1
Zimbabwe	Dynamos FC	2	1	0	1	4	4	0
Subtotal		2	1	0	1	4	4	+0
Total		110	45	27	38	150	115	+35

=== Non-CAF competitions ===
Arab Competitions

Result summary by country
Country	Pld	W	D	L	GF	GA	GD
Bahrain	4	2	2	0	5	3	+2
Egypt	4	1	1	2	3	9	-6
Iraq	4	2	2	0	6	1	+5
Kuwait	2	2	0	0	4	2	+2
Morocco	2	1	0	1	2	2	+0
Oman	2	1	1	0	2	1	+1
Saudi Arabia	6	3	1	2	7	6	+1
Sudan	4	1	1	2	2	4	-2
Tunisia	2	1	0	1	2	5	-3
Yemen	2	1	1	0	2	1	+1
Total	32	15	9	8	35	34	+1

== Statistics ==
=== By season ===
Information correct as of 24 October 2026.
Key

- Pld = Played
- W = Games won
- D = Games drawn
- L = Games lost
- F = Goals for
- A = Goals against
- Grp = Group stage
- PR = Preliminary round
- R1 = First round
- R2 = Second round
- SR16 = Second Round of 16
- R16 = Round of 16
- QF = Quarter-final
- SF = Semi-final

Key to colours and symbols:

W	Winners
RU	Runners-up

MC Alger record in African football by season
Season	Competition	Pld	W	D	L	GF	GA	GD	Round
1976	Cup of Champions Clubs	10	6	0	4	21	13	+8	W
1977	Cup of Champions Clubs	4	2	1	1	6	6	+0	QF
1979	Cup of Champions Clubs	4	3	0	1	6	3	+3	R2
1980	Cup of Champions Clubs	6	3	1	2	11	8	+3	QF
1984	Cup Winners' Cup	4	2	0	2	6	5	+1	R2
2000	CAF Champions League	2	0	1	1	2	6	−4	R1
2007	Confederation Cup	2	1	0	1	3	3	+0	R1
2008	Confederation Cup	2	0	1	1	0	1	−1	R1
2011	CAF Champions League	12	4	4	4	15	20	−5	Grp
2015	Confederation Cup	2	0	1	1	0	2	−2	R1
2017	Confederation Cup	14	7	2	5	20	15	+5	QF
2018	CAF Champions League	10	3	2	5	20	11	+9	Grp
2020–21	CAF Champions League	12	4	5	3	13	9	+4	QF
2024–25	CAF Champions League	12	5	4	3	10	4	+6	QF
2025–26	CAF Champions League	10	3	4	3	9	7	+2	Grp
2026–27	CAF Champions League	4	2	1	1	8	2	+6	
Total		150	45	27	38	150	115	+35	

=== By competition ===
==== In Africa ====
As of 14 February 2026:

CAF competitions
Competition	Seasons	Played	Won	Drawn	Lost	Goals for	Goals against	Last season played
Champions League	10	82	33	22	27	113	87	2025–26
CAF Cup Winners' Cup	1	4	2	0	2	6	5	1984
CAF Confederation Cup	4	20	8	4	8	23	21	2017
Total	15	106	43	26	37	142	113	

==== Non-CAF competitions ====
As of 31 March 2020:

Non-CAF competitions
Competition	Seasons	Played	Won	Drawn	Lost	Goals For	Goals Against	Last season played
Arab Champions League	5	32	15	9	8	35	34	2019–20
Maghreb Champions Cup	1	2	1	1	0	1	0	1976
Maghreb Cup Winners Cup	4	7	4	1	2	13	8	1974
Total	10	41	20	11	10	49	42	

== African competitions goals ==
Statistics correct as of game against Mamelodi Sundowns on February 14, 2026

List of MC Alger players with 4 or more goals
Position	Player	TOTAL	CL1	CWC	CCC
1	(Algeria) Hichem Nekkache	11	6	–	5
2	(Algeria) Abdeslam Bousri	9	9	–	–
3	(Algeria) Zoubir Bachi	6	6	–	–
4	(Algeria) Walid Derrardja	5	4	–	1
=	(Algeria) Abderahmane Hachoud	5	1	–	4
6	(Algeria) Lakhdar Belloumi	4	4	–	–
=	(Algeria) Sofiane Bayazid	4	4	–	–
=	(Algeria) Omar Betrouni	4	4	–	–
=	(Algeria) Mohammed Azzouz	4	4	–	–
=	(Algeria) Brahim Boudebouda	4	3	–	1
Totals		139	110	6	23

=== Hat-tricks ===
N	Date	Player	Match	Score	Time of goals
1	21 February 2018	Hichem Nekkache^{4}	MC Alger – AS Otôho	9–0	23', 61', 66', 80'

=== Two goals one match ===
N	Date	Player	Match	Score
1	10 September 1976	Abdeslam Bousri	MC Alger – Luo Union	6–3
2	10 September 1976	Ali Bencheikh	MC Alger – Luo Union	6–3
3	18 December 1976	Omar Betrouni	MC Alger – Hafia FC	3–0
4	7 June 1980	Lakhdar Belloumi	MC Alger – Stella Club d'Adjamé	3–1
5	3 April 2011	Brahim Bedbouda	MC Alger – Dynamos	3–0
6	16 September 2011	Réda Babouche	MC Alger – Wydad Casablanca	3–1
7	18 February 2017	Abderahmane Hachoud	MC Alger – Bechem United	4–1
8	15 April 2017	Sid Ahmed Aouedj	MC Alger – Young Africans	4–0
9	20 June 2017	Hichem Nekkache	MC Alger – Mbabane Swallows	2–0
10	17 March 2018	Hichem Nekkache	MC Alger – Mountain FM	6–0
11	19 December 2020	Abdelhak Abdelhafid	MC Alger – Buffles du Borgou	5–1
12	28 December 2020	Samy Frioui	MC Alger – CS Sfaxien	2–0

== Non-CAF competitions goals ==
P	Player	Goals
1	(Algeria) Noureddine Daham	6
2	(Algeria) Karim Braham Chaouch	5
3	(Algeria) Hassen Tahir	3
=	(Algeria) Hadj Bouguèche	3
5	(Algeria) Sofiane Younès	2
=	(Algeria) Mohamed Badache	2
=	(Algeria) Aissa Draoui	2
=	(Mali) Rafan Sidibé	2

P	Player	Goals
=	(Algeria) Omar Betrouni	2
10	(Algeria) Hamid Tahir	1
=	(Algeria) Abdeslam Bousri	1
=	(Algeria) Ali Bencheikh	1
=	(Algeria) Anouar Bachta	1
=	(Algeria) Mohamed Azzouz	1
=	(Algeria) Zoubir Bachi	1
=	(Algeria) Fayçal Badji	1

P	Player	Goals
=	(Algeria) Kamel Bouacida	1
=	(Algeria) Fodil Hadjadj	1
=	(Algeria) Kamel Maouche	1
=	(Algeria) Ameur Benali	1
=	Own Goals	2

== List of all-time appearances ==
This list of all-time appearances for MC Alger in African competitions contains football players who have played for MC Alger in African football competitions and have managed to accrue 20 or more appearances.

Gold Still playing competitive football in MC Alger
Statistics correct as of game against Mamelodi Sundowns on February 14, 2026

#	Name	Position	CCL	CWC	CCC	SC	Total	Date of first cap	Debut against	Date of last cap	Final match against
1	(Algeria) Abderahmane Hachoud	RB	21	–	13	–	34	14 Feb 2015	Sahel SC	22 May 2021	Wydad AC
2	(Algeria) Zakaria Naidji	FW	22	–	–	–	22	18 Aug 2024	Watanga	—	—
3	(Algeria) Ayoub Abdellaoui	CB	21	–	–	–	21	18 Aug 2024	Watanga	—	—
4	(Algeria) Walid Derrardja	ST	9	–	12	–	21	12 Feb 2017	Bechem United	28 Aug 2018	ES Sétif
5	(Algeria) Bouzid Mahiouz	DF	21	–	–	–	21	30 Apr 1976	Al-Ahly Benghazi	27 Sep 1980	Canon Yaoundé
6	(Algeria) Ayoub Ghezala	CB	20	–	–	–	20	18 Aug 2024	Watanga	—	—
7	(Algeria) Hichem Nekkache	ST	8	–	12	–	20	18 Feb 2017	Bechem United	28 Aug 2018	ES Sétif
8	(Algeria) Abdeslam Bousri	FW	20	–	–	–	20	13 May 1976	Al-Ahly Benghazi	7 Jun 1980	Stella Adjamé
