= 1982–83 MP Alger season =

MC Alger
1982–83 season
- Head coach: Abdennour Kaoua
- Stadium: Stade du 5 Juillet
- National: 4th
- Algerian Cup: Winners
- Top goalscorer: League: Abdeslam Bousri (17); All: Abdesslem Bousri (19)
- Highest home attendance: 44.957 vs. USK Alger (29 October 1982)
- Lowest home attendance: 576 vs. GCR Mascara (27 May 1983)
- Average home league attendance: 15,479
Home colours

In the 1982–83 season, MC Alger is competing in the National for the 16th season, as well as the Algerian Cup. It is their 9th consecutive season in the top flight of Algerian football. They will be competing in National, and the Algerian Cup.

== Squad list ==
Players and squad numbers last updated on 18 November 1976.
Note: Flags indicate national team as has been defined under FIFA eligibility rules. Players may hold more than one non-FIFA nationality.

Nat.	Name	Position	Date of birth (age)	Signed from
Goalkeepers
(Algeria)	Mohamed Ait Mouhoub	GK	5 November 1952 (aged 29)	
(Algeria)	Nacer Ait Mouhoub	GK	1 January 1959 (aged 23)	
Defenders
(Algeria)	Youcef Farhi		5 June 1956 (aged 26)	
(Algeria)	Nasreddine Laroussi		25 January 1963 (aged 19)	
(Algeria)	Bouzid Mahiouz		13 January 1952 (aged 30)	
(Algeria)	Nasreddine Mechdal		3 April 1957 (aged 25)	
(Algeria)	Abdelmajid Oudina		20 October 1953 (aged 28)	
(Algeria)	Abdelwahab Zenir		10 November 1951 (aged 30)	
Midfielders
(Algeria)	Abdenour Bellemou			
(Algeria)	Ali Bencheikh		9 January 1955 (aged 27)	
(Algeria)	Mohamed Rabah Ghrib		24 January 1955 (aged 27)	
(Algeria)	Nasreddine Lâaouada		1 July 1963 (aged 19)	
(Algeria)	Saïd Meghichi		5 February 1961 (aged 21)	
Forwards
(Algeria)	Nasser Bouiche	ST	18 June 1960 (aged 22)	
(Algeria)	Abdeslam Bousri	ST	28 January 1953 (aged 29)	
(Algeria)	Nordine Khellaf			

== Pre-season and friendlies ==
24 February 1983 Friendly	MP Alger	0–3	(East Germany) Carl Zeiss Jena	Algiers
			53', 75' Hoppe; 66' Luduig	Stadium: July 5, 1962 Stadium; Referee: Baghdadi, Dane, Terna
Note: Lineup for MP Alger - Ait Mouhoub Mohamed, Agaoua (Oudina), Mechedal, Ferhi, Zenir (Laroussi), Meghichi (Ghrib), Derriche (Bencheikh), Bouras (Bousri), Ferrad, Benaissa Omar (Bellemou)

== Competitions ==
=== Overview ===
Competition	Record							
Competition	G	W	D	L	GF	GA	GD	Win %
National	30	10	10	10	35	33	+2	33.33
Algerian Cup	5	5	0	0	11	6	+5	100.00
Total	35	15	10	10	46	39	+7	42.86

=== Championnat National ===
==== League table ====
Pos	Team	Pld	W	D	L	GF	GA	GD	Pts	Qualification or relegation
2	EP Sétif	30	14	10	6	40	19	+21	68	
3	ESM Bel-Abbès	30	9	14	7	22	32	−10	62	
4	MP Alger	30	10	10	10	35	33	+2	60	Algerian Cup Winner, qualified for Cup Winners' Cup
5	MP Oran	30	9	12	9	29	26	+3	59 (Note: 1 point deducted?)	
6	USM El Harrach	30	9	12	9	25	25	0	59 (Note: 1 point deducted?)	

Source: rsssf.com

=== Results by round ===
Round	1	2	3	4	5	6	7	8	9	10	11	12	13	14	15	16	17	18	19	20	21	22	23	24	25	26	27	28	29	30
Ground	A	H	A	H	A	H	A	H	A	H	A	H	A	A	H	H	A	H	A	H	A	H	A	H	A	H	A	H	H	A
Result	D	W	L	W	W	D	D	D	L	L	L	D	D	W	W	W	L	W	L	W	L	D	L	D	D	D	W	L	W	L
Position	7	4	8	3	3	3	3	4	5	8	10	9	10	7	5	4	6	4	6	5	4	4	5	6	9	9	7	5	3	4

Source: Competitive matches
A = Away; H = Home; W = Win; D = Draw; L = Loss

=== Matches ===
17 September 1982 Round 1	CM Belcourt	0–0	MP Alger	Algiers
				Stadium: July 5, 1962 Stadium; Attendance: 20,000; Referee: Tighilt
Note: Lineup for MP Alger - Ait Mouhoub Nacer- Laroussi (Meghichi)- Oudina- Ferhi- Zenir- Ghrib- Bellemou- Mahiouz- Bousri- Bencheikh- Khellaf (Bouiche) Rem:Ait Mouhoub Mohamed- Sid- Mechedal

24 September 1982 Round 2	MP Alger	1–0	ISM Aïn Béïda	Algiers
	Bousri 85'			Stadium: July 5, 1962 Stadium; Attendance: 18,000; Referee: Rachid Medjiba
Note: Lineup for MP Alger - Ait Mouhoub Nacer- Laroussi- Oudina- Mechedal (Meghichi)- Ferhi- Zenir- Mahiouz- Bellemou- Bencheikh- Bousri- Bouiche- Khellaf Rem: Ait Mouhoub Mohamed- Sid- Laroussi

1 October 1982 Round 3	JE Tizi-Ouzou	2–1	MP Alger	Tizi Ouzou
	Abdesslem 15'; Belahcene 66'		74' Bousri	Stadium: November 1, 1954 Stadium; Attendance: 25,000; Referee: Mohamed Hansal
Note: Lineup for MP Alger - Ait Mouhoub Nacer- Oudina- Mahiouz- Ferhi- Zenir- Ghrib- Marifi- Bencheikh- Bousri- Bouiche (Bouras)- Derrich (Bellemou) Rem: Ait Mouhoub Mohamed-Laroussi-Mechedal

8 October 1982 Round 4	MP Alger	5–1	WO Boufarik	Algiers
	Bousri 25', 60'; Ferrad 30', 62'; Bellemou 84'		55' Sahnoun	Stadium: July 5, 1962 Stadium
Note: Lineup for MP Alger - Ait Mouhoub Mohamed- Mahiouz- Mechedal- Ferhi- Zenir- Ghrib- Marifi- Bellemou- Ghrib- Bousri- Bencheikh- Ferrad Rem: Ait Mouhoub Nacer- Laroussi

15 October 1982 Round 5	RS Kouba	1–2	MP Alger	Algiers
	Bourbala 37'		44', 60' Bousri	Stadium: July 5, 1962 Stadium; Referee: Adbellali
Note: Lineup for MP Alger - Ait Mouhoub Mohamed- Mahiouz- Mechedal (Laroussi)- Ferhi- Oudina- Bencheikh- Bellemou- Ghrib- Bousri- Meghichi- Ferrad (Lâaouada) Remp:Sid-Derriche- Ait Mouhoub Nacer

29 October 1982 Round 6	MP Alger	0–0	USK Alger	Algiers
		Report		Stadium: July 5, 1962 Stadium; Attendance: 44.957; Referee: Garoui, Brahim, Meddane
Note: Lineup for MP Alger - Ait Mouhoub Mohamed, Mahiouz, Oudina, Ferhi, Zenir (cap), Bencheikh, Bellemou, Ghrib, Bousri, Bouiche, El Aouada (Derriche 63')

5 November 1982 Round 7	MP Oran	1–1	MP Alger	Oran
	Bendjehane 51'		5' Bousri	Stadium: Ahmed Zabana Stadium
Note: Lineup for MP Alger - Ait Mouhoub Mohamed- Mahiouz- Oudina- Ferhi- Zenir- Bencheikh- Bellemou- Ghrib- Bousri- Meghichi- Bouiche Remp: Laroussi- Bouras- Mechedal- Derriche- Ait Mouhoub Nacer

12 November 1982 Round 8	MP Alger	2–2	EP Sétif	Algiers
	Bouiche 39', 54'		13' Adjissa; 82' Bendjaballah	Stadium: July 5, 1962 Stadium; Attendance: 24,632; Referee: Belaïd Lacarne
Note: Lineup for MP Alger - Ait Mouhoub Mohamed- Mahiouz- Oudina- Ferhi- Zenir- Bencheikh- Bellemou (Ferrad)- Ghrib- Bousri- Meghichi- Bouiche Remp: Lâaouada- Bouras- Mechedal- Ait Mouhoub Nacer

26 November 1982 Round 9	MA Hussein Dey	1–0	MP Alger	Algiers
	Ait El Hocine 1'			Stadium: July 5, 1962 Stadium; Attendance: 25,000; Referee: Bendjahene
Note: Lineup for MP Alger - Ait Mouhoub Nacer- Laroussi- Oudina- Ferhi- Zenir- Mahiouz- Bellemou- Bencheikh- Meghichi- Bousri- Meghichi- Bouiche Remp:Ait Mouhoub Mohamed

3 December 1982 Round 10	MP Alger	1–2	ESM Bel-Abbès	Bologhine
	Bousri 85'		42' Louahla; 74' Fodil	Stadium: Omar Hamadi Stadium; Attendance: 6,456; Referee: Roumani
Note: Lineup for MP Alger - Ait Mouhoub Mohamed- Mahiouz- Oudina- Mechedal- Sid Abdellah- Mahiouz- Lâaouada- Chaib- Ghrib- Bousri- Bencheikh- Bouiche Remp: Ait Mouhoub Nacer

10 December 1982 Round 11	GCR Mascara	1–0	MP Alger	Mascara
	Châabane 64'			Stadium: Stade Meftah Aouad; Attendance: 10,000; Referee: Bounaga
Note: Lineup for MP Alger - Ait Mouhoub Mohamed- Laroussi- Oudina (Mechedal)- Ferhi- Mahiouz- Bencheikh- Lâaouada- Meghichi- Bousri- Bouiche- Derriche (Ghrib) Remp: Bouras- Sid Abdellah- Ait Mouhoub Nacer

24 December 1982 Round 12	MP Alger	0–0	WKF Collo	Algiers
				Stadium: July 5, 1962 Stadium
Note: Lineup for MP Alger - Ait Mouhoub Mohamed- Laroussi- Oudina- Ferhi- Mahiouz- Bencheikh- Lâaouada (Derriche 72e)- Ghrib (Ferrad 46e)- Bousri- Bouiche- Meghichi Remp: Mechedal- Sid Abdellah- Ait Mouhoub

31 December 1982 Round 13	USM El Harrach	0–0	MP Alger	Algiers
				Stadium: July 5, 1962 Stadium; Attendance: 10,252; Referee: Bouzareg
Note: Lineup for MP Alger - Ait Mouhoub Mohamed- Laroussi- Oudina- Ferhi- Mahiouz- Bencheikh- Bellemou- Meghichi- Bousri- Bouiche- Derriche

7 January 1983 Round 14	ASC Oran	0–1	MP Alger	Oran
			67' Bellemou	Stadium: Habib Bouakeul Stadium; Attendance: 15,000; Referee: Sayah
Note: Lineup for MP Alger - Ait Mouhoub Nacer- Laroussi- Oudina- Ferhi- Mahiouz- Bencheikh- Lâaouada (Derriche)- Meghichi- Bousri- Bouiche- Bellemou (Yayadène)

21 January 1983 Round 15	MP Alger	4–3	ESM Guelma	Bologhine
	Bousri 15', 41', 67', 80'		70', 75', 88' Boulouh	Stadium: Omar Hamadi Stadium; Attendance: 6,134; Referee: Bachtobdji
Note: Lineup for MP Alger - Ait Mouhoub Nacer- Laroussi- Oudina (Mechedal)- Mahiouz- Zenir- Bencheikh- Ghrib- Meghichi- Bousri- Bouiche- Bellemou (Lâaouada)

28 January 1983 Round 16	MP Alger	2–0	CM Belcourt	Algiers
	Bousri 26'; Zenir 47' (pen.)			Stadium: July 5, 1962 Stadium; Attendance: 11,000; Referee: Mohamed Hansal
Note: Lineup for MP Alger - Ait Mouhoub Nacer- Laroussi- Oudina- Mahiouz- Zenir- Bencheikh- Bellemou (Lâaouada)- Ghrib- Bousri- Bouiche (Derriche)- Meghichi.

11 February 1983 Round 17	ISM Aïn Béïda	2–1	MP Alger	Aïn Beïda
	Soltani 28'; Djertli 46'		84' Zenir	Stadium: Stade 24 avril Referee: Belaïd Lacarne
Note: Lineup for MP Alger - Ait Mouhoub Nacer- Laroussi- Oudina- Mahiouz- Zenir- Meghichi- Bellemou- Ghrib (Lâaouada)- Bousri- Bouiche- Derriche.

18 February 1983 Round 18	MP Alger	1–0	JE Tizi-Ouzou	Algiers
	Bellemou 19'			Stadium: July 5, 1962 Stadium; Attendance: 3,3811; Referee: Belaïd Lacarne
Note: Lineup for MP Alger - Ait Mouhoub Mohamed- Laroussi- Oudina- Mahiouz- Zenir- Bencheikh- Bellemou- Ghrib- Bousri- Bouiche- Meghichi.

11 March 1983 Round 19	WO Boufarik	1–0	MP Alger	Boufarik
	Tlidjane 30'			Stadium: Stade Mohamed Reggaz; Referee: Sayah
Note: Lineup for MP Alger - Ait Mouhoub Mohamed- Laroussi- Mechedal- Ferhi- Zenir- Meghichi- Bellemou (Bouras)- Ghrib- Bousri- Bouiche- Ferrad (Derriche).

18 March 1983 Round 20	MP Alger	3–2	RS Kouba	Algiers
	Bousri 67', 90'; Bouiche 77'		88' Chaib; 90+1' Hamada	Stadium: July 5, 1962 Stadium; Attendance: 5,186; Referee: Seghi
Note: Lineup for MP Alger - Ait Mouhoub Mohamed- Oudina- Laroussi (Mechedal)- Ferhi- Zenir- Bencheikh- Bellemou- Meghichi S- Bousri- Bouiche- Derriche (Ghrib).

25 March 1983 Round 21	USK Alger	2–1	MP Alger	Algiers
	Azzouz 2'; Rabet 69'		85' (pen.) Bousri	Stadium: July 5, 1962 Stadium; Attendance: 1.439; Referee: Rachid Medjiba
Note: Lineup for MP Alger - Ait Mouhoub Mohamed, Oudina, Laroussi, Ferhi, Zenir, Mahiouz, Bellemou, Bouras, Bousri, Bouiche, Meghichi.

8 April 1983 Round 22	MP Alger	1–1	MP Oran	Algiers
	Zenir 44'		88' Ouanes	Stadium: July 5, 1962 Stadium; Attendance: 6,000; Referee: Morgsli
Note: Lineup for MP Alger - Ait Mouhoub Mohamed- Oudina- Laroussi- Mahiouz- Zenir- Ferhi (Bouras)- Bellemou (Derriche)- Ghrib- Bousri- Meghichi- Lâaouada.

15 April 1983 Round 23	EP Sétif	5–1	MP Alger	Sétif
	Rouai 20'; Adjissa 25', 44', 71', 75'		80' Bousri	Stadium: Stade 8 Mai 1945; Referee: Bendjahane
Note: Lineup for MP Alger - Ait Mouhoub Mohamed- Oudina- Laroussi- Ferhi (Mechedal)- Mahiouz- Meghichi- Bellemou- Chaib- Bousri- Yayadène- Ferrad (Lâaouada).

13 May 1983 Round 24	MP Alger	2–2	MA Hussein Dey	Algiers
	Bellemou 15'; Bouiche 31'		41' Madjer; 54' (pen.) Guendouz	Stadium: July 5, 1962 Stadium; Attendance: 5,904; Referee: Othmani
Note: Lineup for MP Alger - Ait Mouhoub Mohamed- Laroussi- Mechedal- Ferhi (Oudina)- Meghichi- Bellemou- Ghrib- Bousri- Bouiche- Bencheikh

29 April 1983 Round 25	ESM Bel-Abbès	0–0	MP Alger	Sidi Bel Abbes
				Stadium: Stade des trois frères Amarouch; Referee: Mimouni
Note: Lineup for MP Alger - Ait Mouhoub Mohamed- Laroussi- Mechedal- Ferhi- Oudina- Zenir- Bellemou- Ghrib (Yayadène)- Bouiche- Meghichi.

27 May 1983 Round 26	MP Alger	0–0	GCR Mascara	Algiers
				Stadium: July 5, 1962 Stadium; Attendance: 576; Referee: Seghiri, Boudjemlia, Handis
Note: Lineup for MP Alger - Ait Mouhoub Mohamed, Laroussi, Mechedal, Farhi, Oudina, Meghichi, Bellemou (Bouras), Derriche, Yayadène (Ferrad), Bousri, Lâaouada.

3 June 1983 Round 27	WKF Collo	0–2	MP Alger	Collo
			30' Bousri; 40' Drici	Stadium: Stade Benjamâa Amar; Referee: Bounaga, Nefoussi, Bendali
Note: Lineup for MP Alger - Ait Mouhoub Nacer, Laroussi, Akrour, Mechedal, Farhi, Lâaouada, Drici, Yayadène, Chaib, Benaissa, Bousri, Bouras.

10 June 1983 Round 28	MP Alger	0–1	USM El Harrach	Algiers
			11' Kermiche	Stadium: July 5, 1962 Stadium; Attendance: 4,000; Referee: Tlemçen, Chouchi, Laib
Note: Lineup for MP Alger - Ait Mouhoub Mohamed, Laroussi (Agaoua), Mechedal, Farhi, Oudina, Meghichi, Lâaouada, Derriche (Ferrad), Yayadène, Bouras, Chaib.

13 June 1983 Round 29	MP Alger	1–0	ASC Oran	Bologhine
			63' Bellemou	Stadium: Omar Hamadi Stadium; Referee: Kouras, Kouradji, Koussa
Note: Lineup for MP Alger - Ait Mouhoub Mohamed, Laroussi, Mechedal, Farhi, Oudina, Meghichi, Bellemou (Ferrad), Derriche, Yayadène, Bousri (c), Bouras (Lâaouada).

17 June 1983 Round 30	ESM Guelma	3–1	MP Alger	Guelma
	Boulouh 3', 51'; Demène 58'		78' (pen.) ?	Stadium: Stade Ali Abda; Referee: Abdelaâli, Benderradji, Bendekache
Note: Lineup for MP Alger - Ait Mouhoub Mohamed, Laroussi, Agaoua, Khettab, Raissi, Ferhi, Lâaouada, Derriche, Yayadène, Ferrad, Chaib.

== Algerian Cup ==
4 February 1983 Round of 32	IR Tidjara	1–2	MP Alger	El Harrach
	Bensalem 24'		Bouiche 52'; Meghichi 70'	Stadium: November 1, 1954 Stadium
Note: Lineup for MP Alger - Ait Mouhoub Nacer- Laroussi- Oudina- Mahiouz- Zenir- Bencheikh- Bellemou- Ghrib (Derriche)- Bousri- Bouiche (Lâaouada)- Meghichi.

3 March 1983 Round of 16	MP Alger	3–2	JE Tizi Ouzou	Algiers
	Gherib 35'; Mahiouz 66'; Bencheikh 89'		51' Belahcene; 61' Baris	Stadium: July 5, 1962 Stadium; Attendance: 80,000; Referee: Hansal
Note: Lineup for MP Alger - Ait Mouhoub Mohamed, Oudina, Laroussi, Mahiouz, Zenir, Bencheikh, Bellemou (Ferhi), Ghrib, Bousri, Bouiche, Meghichi.

1 April 1983 Quarter-finals	MP Alger	1–0	CM Belcourt	Algiers
				Stadium: July 5, 1962 Stadium
Note: Lineup for MP Alger - Ait Mouhoub Mohamed, Oudina, Laroussi, Mahiouz, Zenir, Bencheikh, Bellemou (Ferhi), Ghrib, Bousri, Bouiche (Bouras), Meghichi.

6 May 1983 Semi-finals	MP Alger	1–0	RS Kouba	Algiers
	Bencheikh 76'			Stadium: July 5, 1962 Stadium; Attendance: 70,000
Note: Lineup for MP Alger - Ait Mouhoub Mohamed, Oudina, Laroussi, Mahiouz, Zenir, Bencheikh, Bellemou, Ghrib (Ferhi), Bousri, Bouiche, Meghichi.

20 May 1983 Final	MP Alger	4–3	ASC Oran	Algiers
	Bousri 16', 46'; Bencheikh 57'; Bellemou 110'		10', 55' (pen.) H. Tasfaout; 88' Lafdjah	Stadium: July 5, 1962 Stadium; Attendance: 43,000; Referee: Ghotari
Note: Lineup for MP Alger - Ait Mouhoub, Oudina, Zenir, Mahiouz, Laroussi, Bencheikh, Ghrib (Ferhi), Meghichi, Bellemou, Bouiche, Bousri.

== Squad information ==
=== Appearances and goals ===
No.	Pos	Nat	Player	Total		National		Algerian Cup	
No.	Pos	Nat	Player	Apps	Goals	Apps	Goals	Apps	Goals
Goalkeepers
-	GK	(Algeria) ALG	Mohamed Ait Mouhoub	25	0	21	0	4	0
-	GK	(Algeria) ALG	Nacer Ait Mouhoub	10	0	9	0	1	0
Defenders
-	DF	(Algeria) ALG	Djamel Agaoua	3	0	3	0	0	0
-	DF	(Algeria) ALG	Youcef Farhi	31	0	27	0	4	0
-	DF	(Algeria) ALG	Boualem Khettab	1	0	1	0	0	0
-	DF	(Algeria) ALG	Nasreddine Laroussi	28	0	23	0	5	0
-	DF	(Algeria) ALG	Bouzid Mahiouz	26	1	21	0	5	1
-	DF	(Algeria) ALG	Nasreddine Mechdal	15	0	15	0	0	0
-	DF	(Algeria) ALG	Abdelmajid Oudina	31	0	26	0	5	0
-	DF	(Algeria) ALG	Abdelkrim Raissi	1	0	1	0	0	0
-	DF	(Algeria) ALG	Sid Abdallah	1	0	1	0	0	0
-	DF	(Algeria) ALG	Abdelwahab Zenir	22	3	17	3	5	0
Midfielders
-	MF	(Algeria) ALG	Abdenour Bellemou	29	6	24	5	5	1
-	MF	(Algeria) ALG	Ali Bencheikh	24	3	19	0	5	3
-	MF	(Algeria) ALG	Chaib	4	0	4	0	0	0
-	MF	(Algeria) ALG	Drici	1	1	1	1	0	0
-	MF	(Algeria) ALG	Mohamed Ghrib	23	1	18	0	5	1
-	MF	(Algeria) ALG	Nasreddine Lâaouada	15	0	14	0	1	0
-	MF	(Algeria) ALG	Marifi	2	0	2	0	0	0
-	MF	(Algeria) ALG	Saïd Meghichi	29	1	24	0	5	1
Forwards
-	FW	(Algeria) ALG	Nasser Bouiche	26	6	21	4	5	2
-	FW	(Algeria) ALG	Othmane Bouras	10	1	9	1	1	0
-	FW	(Algeria) ALG	Abdeslam Bousri	32	19	27	17	5	2
-	FW	(Algeria) ALG	Sid Ahmed Derriche	17	0	16	0	1	0
-	FW	(Algeria) ALG	Djamel Ferrad	13	0	11	0	2	0
-	FW	(Algeria) ALG	Nordine Khellaf	2	0	2	0	0	0
-	FW	(Algeria) ALG	Abderrahmane Yadadene	8	0	8	0	0	0

Last updated: 1 May 2017
Source: Competitions

=== Goalscorers ===
Includes all competitive matches. The list is sorted alphabetically by surname when total goals are equal.

No.	Nat.	Player	Pos.	National 1	Cup	TOTAL
?	(Algeria)	Abdeslam Bousri	FW	17	2	19
?	(Algeria)	Abdenour Bellemou	MF	5	1	6
?	(Algeria)	Nasser Bouiche	FW	4	2	6
?	(Algeria)	Ali Bencheikh	MF	0	3	3
?	(Algeria)	Abdelwahab Zenir	DF	3	0	3
?	(Algeria)	Ferrad	FW	2	0	2
?	(Algeria)	Bouzid Mahiouz	MF	0	1	1
?	(Algeria)	Saïd Meghichi	FW	0	1	1
?	(Algeria)	Mohamed Ghrib	MF	0	1	1
?	(Algeria)	Drici	DF	1	0	1
Own Goals				0	0	0
Totals				35	11	46
