= 1975–76 Algerian Cup =

كأس الجزائر

Tournament details
- Country: Algeria

Final positions
- Champions: MC Alger (3)
- Runners-up: MO Constantine

The 1975–76 Algerian Cup was the 14th edition of the Algerian Cup. MC Alger defeated MO Constantine 2-0 in the final.

MC Oran were the defending champions, but they lost to WA Boufarik in the Round of 16. This was the second season in a row that MO Constantine lost in the final, as they had also lost 2-0 to MC Oran the previous year.

== Quarter-finals ==
7 March 1976	MC Alger	1 – 1 (a.e.t)	NA Hussein Dey	Stade 5 Juillet 1962, Algiers
	Ait Hamouda 92'	Report	112' Zarabi	Referee: Bounaga

7 March 1976	MO Constantine	2 – 1	CR Belouizdad	,

7 March 1976	SA Mohammadia	2 – 1 (a.e.t)	WA Boufarik	,

7 March 1976	ES Sétif	1 – 0 (a.e.t)	Hamra Annaba	Ramadan Ben-Abdelmalek Stadium, Constantine

== Semi-finals ==
4 April 1976 first leg	SA Mohammadia	1 – 3	MC Alger	Stade 19 juin 1965, Oran
	Benfetta 13'	Report	16' Bachi; 87' Betrouni; 90' Ait Hamouda

25 April 1976 Second leg	MC Alger	7 – 0	SA Mohammadia	Stade d'El Anasser, Algiers
	Bachi 18'; Bencheikh 19', 49'; Azzouz 21' (pen.); Bousri 30'; Mahiouz 60'; Bellemou 62'	Report		Referee: Benghezal

4 April 1976 first leg	ES Sétif	1 – 1	MO Constantine	Stade Mohamed Guessab, Sétif

25 April 1976 Second leg	MO Constantine	1 – 1	ES Sétif	Ramadan Ben-Abdelmalek Stadium, Constantine

== Final ==
=== Match ===
June 19, 1976
20:00

MC Alger	2 - 0	MO Constantine
Bellemou 2'; Bencheikh 10'	Report

Stade 5 Juillet 1962, Algiers
Attendance: 80.000
Referee: Aouissi
