= 1972–73 Algerian Cup =

1971–72 Algerian Cup
كأس الجزائر

Tournament details
- Country: Algeria

Final positions
- Champions: MC Alger (2)
- Runners-up: USM Alger

The 1972–73 Algerian Cup was the 11th edition of the Algerian Cup. Hamra Annaba were the defending champions, having beaten USM Alger 2–0 in the previous season's final.

== Round of 16 ==
| 18 March 1973 | NA Hussein Dey | 3–1 | HAMRA Annaba | , |

| 18 March 1973 | JS Kawkabi | 3–3 corners 6–2 | MC Oran | Stade 5 Juillet 1962, Algiers |

| 18 March 1973 | USM Alger | 2–0 | OMR El Annasser | , |

| 18 March 1973 | MC Alger | 1–0 | MC Saïda | Habib Bouakeul Stadium, Oran |
| | Aizel 85' |

| 18 March 1973 | USM Blida | 1–0 | USM Bel Abbès | Habib Bouakeul Stadium, Oran |
| | Akli ?' |

| 18 March 1973 | ES Sétif | 1–0 | RC Kouba | , |

| 18 March 1973 | ASM Oran | 2–1 | O Sempac d'Alger | , |

| 18 March 1973 | DNC ANP (Alger) | 3–1 | CC Sig | , |

== Quarter-finals ==
| 8 April 1973 | MC Alger | 2–1 | JS Kabylie | Stade 5 Juillet 1962, Algiers |
| | Aizel 62'; Draoui 70' | Report | Dali 79' | Referee: Bencheriet, Lahmar, Lazreg |

| 8 April 1973 | USM Alger | 1–0 | NA Hussein Dey | Stade 5 Juillet 1962, Algiers |
| | Aissaoui |

| 8 April 1973 | ASM Oran | 2–0 | DNC Alger | , |

| 8 April 1973 | USM Blida | 1–0 | ES Sétif | Stade 5 Juillet 1962, Algiers |
| | Nacer Akli 52' |

== Semi-finals ==
| 2 May 1973 first leg | MC Alger | 1–0 | ASM Oran | Stade 5 Juillet 1962, Algiers |
| 19:00 | Draoui 85' | Report |

| 9 May 1973 Second leg | ASM Oran | 3–3 | MC Alger | Stade Habib Bouakeul, Oran |
| | Smahi 27'; Reguieg 70' ? ?' | Report | Bousri 10', 38'; Draoui 73' | Referee: Bakir, Kezzoula, Bensedik |

| 2 May 1973 first leg | USM Alger | 1–0 | USM Blida | Stade 5 Juillet 1962, Algiers |
| | Aissaoui 78' | | | Attendance: 19,454 |

| 9 May 1973 Second leg | USM Blida | 1–3 | USM Alger | Stade 5 Juillet 1962, Algiers |

== Final ==
=== Match ===
June 19, 1973
20:00

| USM Alger | 2 - 4 (a.e.t) | MC Alger |
|---|---|---|
| Attoui 18', 120' | report | 36' Bachi; 96' Kaoua; 106' Bousri; 116' Betrouni |

Stade 5 Juillet 1962, Algiers
Attendance: 80.000
Referee: Ben Ghazal

| USM Alger | MC Alger |
