= Okoume FC =

Okoume
- Full name: Okoume FC
- Nickname: Hotel Okoumé Palace
- Ground: ? Libreville, Gabon
- Capacity: ?
- Chairman: ?
- Manager: ?
- League: Gabon Championnat National D3
Home colours

Okoume FC is a Gabonese football club based in Libreville. They plays in the Gabon Championnat National D3.

The team has participated in the 1976 African Cup of Champions Clubs.

== Performance in CAF competitions ==
- CAF Champions League: 1 appearance

1976 African Cup of Champions Clubs – First Round
