= Saïd Meghichi =

Algerian footballer (born 1961)

Personal information
- Date of birth: 5 February 1961 (age 65)
- Place of birth: Alger, French Algeria
- Position: Midfielder

Senior career*
Years	Team	Apps	(Gls)
1980-1990	MC Alger		

International career
1981–1985	Algeria	16	(0)
- * Club domestic league appearances and goals

Saïd Meghichi (born 5 February 1961) is an Algerian former footballer who played as a midfielder. He made 16 appearances for the Algeria national team in 1981 and 1985. He was also named in Algeria's squad for the 1988 African Cup of Nations tournament.
