= 1970–71 Algerian Cup =

كأس الجزائر

Tournament details
- Country: Algeria

Final positions
- Champions: MC Alger (1)
- Runners-up: USM Alger

The 1970–71 Algerian Cup was the 9th edition of the Algerian Cup. CR Belcourt were the defending champions, having beaten USM Alger 4–1 in the previous season's final.

== Round of 32 ==
30 January 1971	CS Constantine	2 – 0	SCM Oran
	Amara 58', 80'

30 January 1971	SA Mohammadia	2 – 0	USM Aïn Beïda
	Ben Halima 48'; Ben Fetta 2 56'

30 January 1971	GC Mascara	0 – 1	USM Oran
			62' Baghdad

30 January 1971	MC Oran	2 – 1	Olympique de Médéa
	Fréha 20', 42'		26' (pen.) Benmehal

30 January 1971	USM Alger	4 – 1	O Sempac

30 January 1971	USM Khenchela	0 – 0	AS Onaco

30 January 1971	ES Guelma	2 – 1	CAC Constantine

30 January 1971	NA Hussein Dey	1 – 2	MO Constantine

7 February 1971	JSM Skikda	2 – 2 (a.e.t.)	CSS Oran
	Draoui 93'; Boulahcel 102'		92' Bessi; 116' Rais

7 February 1971	MC Saida	2 – 1	CC Sig
	Tlemcani 42'; Maachou 58'		88' Ben Halima

7 February 1971	MC Alger	1 – 0	USM Bel-Abbès	Stade Mâamar Sahli, Al-Asnam
	Tahir 55'

7 February 1971	US Tebessa	2 – 2 (a.e.t.)	IS Tighennif
	Bouras 46'; Mokrani 101'		11' Maazouz; 119' Ben Yahia

7 February 1971	JS Kabylie	8 – 1	US Draa Benkhada	Stade Oukil Ramdane, Tizi Ouzou

7 February 1971	CR Belcourt	2 – 1	CS Douanes

7 February 1971	CSS Kouba	1 – 0	WA Boufarik

7 February 1971	USM Annaba	4 – 0	ASPTT Constantine

== Round of 16 ==
21 March 1971	CR Belcourt	1 – 1 (a.e.t.)	CS Constantine	Stade Mohamed Guessab, Sétif

21 March 1971	USM Alger	1 – 0	US Tébessa	Stade Ben Abdelmalek, Constantine
	Aïssaoui ?'

21 March 1971	MC Saïda	2 – 1	SA Mohammadia
	Fares 2', 85'		10' Serier

21 March 1971	MC Alger	2 – 2	JS Kabylie	Stade d'El Anasser, Algiers
	Bachi 3', 93'		10' (o.g.) Cheikh; 55' Djebbar	Referee: Settaoui

21 March 1971	MC Oran	2 – 4 (a.e.t.)	MO Constantine
	Chaib 4'; Mehdi 73'		58' Fendi; 83' Gamouh; 94' Bouridah; 100' Krokro

21 March 1971	RC Kouba	1 – 2	USM Oran
	Ait Chegou 58'		40', 78' Baghdad

21 March 1971	USM Khenchela	1 – 0	CSS Oran
	Boukolt 81'

21 March 1971	ES Guelma	3 – 3 (a.e.t.)	USM Annaba

== Quarter-finals ==
16 May 1971 first leg	MC Alger	6 – 0	MO Constantine	Stade Bologhine, Algiers
	Betrouni 6', 73', 85'; Tahir 10', 80'; Bachi 32'	Report		Referee: Daho

23 May 1971 Second leg	MO Constantine	1 – 3	MC Alger	Stade Ben Abdelmalek, Constantine
	Barkat 44'	Report	22' Bachi; 30', 67' Tahir

16 May 1971 first leg	USM Alger	3 – 1	USM Oran	Stade Bologhine, Algiers
	Meziani 62'; Tchalabi 70' (pen.); Alik 84'		75' Baghdad

23 May 1971 Second leg	USM Oran	2 – 3	USM Alger	Stade 19 juin 1965, Oran

16 May 1971 first leg	CS Constantine	1 – 1	MC Saïda	Stade Ben Abdelmalek, Constantine

23 May 1971 Second leg	MC Saïda	1 – 1 (a.e.t.)	CS Constantine	Stade 13 Avril 1958, Saïda

16 May 1971 first leg	Hamra Annaba	1 – 0	USM Khenchela	Stade Chabou Abdelkader, Annaba

23 May 1971 Second leg	USM Khenchela	2 – 0	Hamra Annaba	,

== Semi-finals ==
30 May 1971 first leg	MC Saïda	1 – 1	MC Alger	Stade 13 Avril 1958, Saïda
	Rahai	Report	80' Amrous	Referee: Bakir

6 June 1971 Second leg	MC Alger	1 – 1 (5–4 p)	MC Saïda	Stade Bologhine, Algiers
	Zerroug 3'	Report	79' Kebir	Referee: Chihani, Maâmeri, Kermiche

30 May 1971 first leg	USM Alger	2 – 0	USM Khenchela	Stade Bologhine, Algiers

6 June 1971 Second leg	USM Khenchela	2 – 2	USM Alger	,

== Final ==
=== Match ===
June 13, 1971

USM Alger	0 – 2	MC Alger
	Report	Betrouni 5'; Bachi 36'

Stade 20 Août 1955, Algiers
Attendance: 20.000
