= 1976 African Cup of Champions Clubs =

Tournament details
- Dates: April - 12 December 1976
- Teams: 25 (from 1 confederation)

Final positions
- Champions: (Algeria) MC Alger (1st title)
- Runners-up: (Guinea) Hafia FC

Tournament statistics
- Matches played: 42
- Goals scored: 128 (3.05 per match)
- Top scorer: (Algeria) Abdeslam Bousri (5 goals)

The African Cup of Champions Clubs 1976 was the 12th edition of the annual international club football competition held in the CAF region (Africa), the African Cup of Champions Clubs. It determined that year's club champion of association football in Africa.

The tournament was played by 25 teams and used a knock-out format with ties played home and away. MC Alger of Algeria won the final, becoming CAF club champion for the first time, and the first club from Algeria to win the trophy.

== First round ==
Team 1	Agg.	Team 2	1st leg	2nd leg
Al-Ahly Benghazi (Libya)	4–5	(Algeria) MC Alger	3–2	1–3
Asante Kotoko (Ghana)	w/o^{1}	(Gabon) Okoume FC	—	—
CARA Brazzaville (Republic of the Congo)	4–2	(Zaire) CS Imana	4–0	0–2
AS Corps Enseignement (Madagascar)	5–6	(Tanzania) Simba SC	4–2	1–4
ASC Diaraf (Senegal)	10–2	(Guinea-Bissau) Os Balantas	6–1	4–1
Express FC (Uganda)	1–1 (4–3 p)	(Cameroon) Caïman Douala	1–0	0–1
Gor Mahia (Kenya)	5–1	(Ethiopia) Saint-George SA	3–1	2–0
Real Banjul (The Gambia)	0–4	(Mali) Djoliba AC	0–2	0–2
Silures Bobo-Dioulasso (Republic of Upper Volta)	w/o^{1}	(Niger) AS FAN Niamey	—	—

^{1} Okoume FC and AS FAN Niamey withdrew.

== Second round ==
Team 1	Agg.	Team 2	1st leg	2nd leg
ASEC Mimosas (Ivory Coast)	4–0	(Republic of Upper Volta) Silures Bobo-Dioulasso	2–0	2–0
Asante Kotoko (Ghana)	2–2 (a)	(Republic of the Congo) CARA Brazzaville	1–0	1–2
Djoliba AC (Mali)	2–3	(Guinea) Hafia FC	2–1	0–2
Enugu Rangers (Nigeria)	2–2 (a)	(Uganda) Express FC	0–0	2–2
Green Buffaloes (Zambia)	4–2	(Tanzania) Simba SC	3–2	1–0
Lomé I (Togo)	1–2	(Senegal) ASC Diaraf	1–1	0–1
Gor Mahia (Kenya)	w/o^{1}	(Sudan) Al-Merrikh	—	—
MC Alger (Algeria)	3–1	(Egypt) Al Ahly	3–0	0–1

^{1} Al-Merrikh withdrew.

== Quarter-finals ==
Team 1	Agg.	Team 2	1st leg	2nd leg
Asante Kotoko (Ghana)	2–2 (a)	(Ivory Coast) ASEC Mimosas	2–1	0–1
ASC Diaraf (Senegal)	2–6	(Guinea) Hafia FC	2–2	0–4
Green Buffaloes (Zambia)	3–4	(Nigeria) Enugu Rangers	3–1	0–3
MC Alger (Algeria)	7–3	(Kenya) Gor Mahia	6–3	1–0

== Semi-finals ==
Team 1	Agg.	Team 2	1st leg	2nd leg
ASEC Mimosas (Ivory Coast)	3–5	(Guinea) Hafia FC	3–0	0–5
Enugu Rangers (Nigeria)	2–3	(Algeria) MC Alger	2–0	0–3

== Final ==
5 December 1976
--:-- UTC+0

Hafia FC (Guinea)	3–0	(Algeria) MC Alger
M. Sylla 24'; B. Sylla 37'; N’Jo Léa 65'

Stade du 28 Septembre, Conakry
Attendance: 30,000
Referee: M. Joyna (Gambia)
12 December 1976
20:45 UTC+1

MC Alger (Algeria)	3–0	(Guinea) Hafia FC
Bachi 24'; Betrouni 76', 90'
Penalties
Zenir (penalty scored); Bencheikh (penalty scored); Bachta (penalty scored)	3–1	(penalty missed) Bangoura; (penalty missed) Diarra; (penalty scored) M. Sylla; (penalty missed) Souleymane

Stade 5 Juillet 1962, Algiers
Attendance: 80,000
Referee: Taoufik Ghazaya (Tunisia)

== Champion ==
African Cup of Champions Clubs
1976 Winners

MC Alger
First Title

== Top scorers ==
The top scorers from the 1976 African Cup of Champions Clubs are as follows:

Rank	Name	Team	Goals
1	(Algeria) Abdeslam Bousri	(Algeria) MC Alger	5
2	(Algeria) Mohamed Azzouz	(Algeria) MC Alger	3
2	(Algeria) Zoubir Bachi	(Algeria) MC Alger	3
2	(Algeria) Omar Betrouni	(Algeria) MC Alger	3
2	(Guinea) N’Jo Léa	(Guinea) Hafia FC	3
2	(Algeria) Ali Bencheikh	(Algeria) MC Alger	2
2	(Guinea) Bengally Sylla	(Guinea) Hafia FC	2
2	(Guinea) Morciré Sylla	(Guinea) Hafia FC	2
2	(Ivory Coast) Paul Bawa	(Ivory Coast) ASEC Mimosas	2
2	(Libya) Ali Mersal	(Libya) Al-Ahly Benghazi	2
