= MC Alger =

Algerian football club

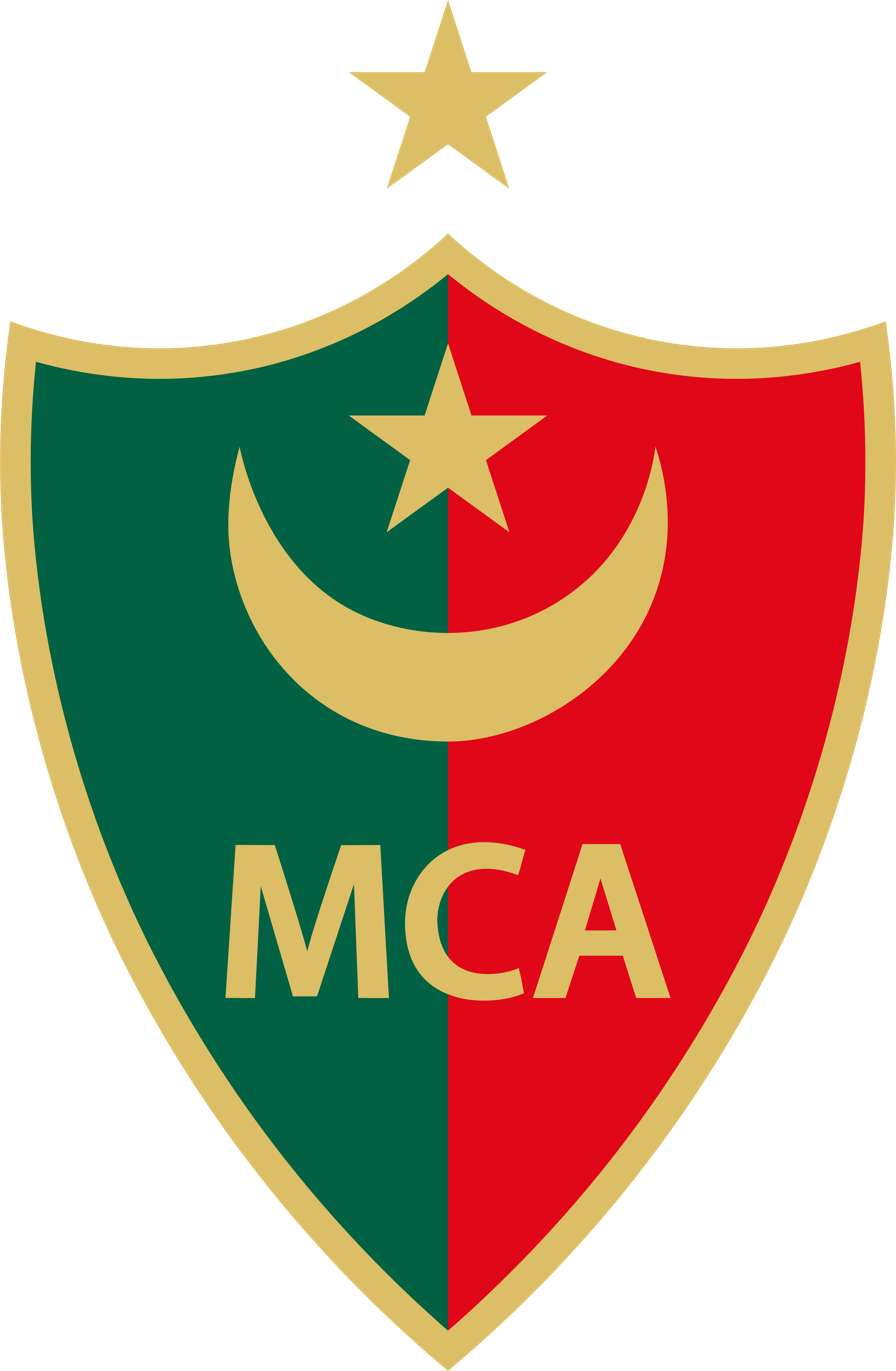
- Full name: Mouloudia Club d'Alger
- Nicknames: MCA; El Mouloudia (The Mouloudia); The Dean; The People's Club Ajax of Africa
- Short name: MCA
- Founded: 7 August 1921; 105 years ago (as Mouloudia Club Algérois)
- Ground: Ali La Pointe Stadium
- Capacity: 40,000
- Owner: Sonatrach
- President: Mohamed Arabi Yaakoubi
- Head Coach: Khaled Ben Yahia
- League: Ligue 1
- 2025–26: Ligue 1, 1st of 16 (champions)
- Website: algermc.com
| Home colours | Away colours | Third colours |

Mouloudia Club d'Alger (Arabic: نادي مولودية الجزائر), referred to as MC Alger or MCA for short, is an Algerian football club based in Algiers. The club was founded in 1921 and its colours are green, red and gold. Their home stadium, Ali La Pointe Stadium, has a capacity of 40,000 spectators. The club is currently playing in the Algerian Ligue Professionnelle 1.

Founded in 1921 as Mouloudia Club Algérois and Mouloudia Chaâbia d’Alger, the club was known as Mouloudia Pétroliers d'Alger from 1977 to 1986 and changed its name to Mouloudia Club d'Alger in 1986. The club colours are red and green.

Mouloudia were the first Algerian club to win a continental competition, winning the 1976 African Cup of Champions Clubs. They are one of the most successful Algerian clubs having won the domestic league 10 times, and the domestic cup 8 times, tied with USM Alger, CR Belouizdad and ES Sétif.

As of the 2023–24 season, Mouloudia was the Algerian football club with the highest market value. The market value was €9.68 million.

== History ==
=== Birth of Mouloudia, the dean of Algerian clubs ===
In 1921, Aouf Ahmed, a member of a wealthy family from the Casbah and a former student at the Sarrouy school, witnessed a scene that made him want to create a football club. On the Place du Gouvernement, now Place des Martyrs5, children were playing football with a ball made from paper. French soldiers were watching them, and a sergeant declared: "Here is the Parc des Princes of the Arabs!" This statement annoyed him and prompted him to talk about his project to his friends the next day. The meeting that gave birth to the club took place in the back room of the café on rue Bénachère (called Souikia). Several names were proposed: Éclair sportif d’Alger, Croissant club d’Alger, Étoile sportive d'Alger, Jeunesse sportive d'Alger, until the name chosen Mouloudia Club Algérois. The colors (green and red) were chosen for these reasons: green represents the hope of the Algerian people, it is also the symbolic color of Islam. Red symbolizes love of the nation and sacrifice, it is also one of the favorite colors of the prophet Mohammed.

Encouraged by his friends, Ahmed Aouf organized the club statutes and regulations of the association, staff, preparation of resources (materials and finances), choice of acronym, problems of supervision, acquisition of a playing field and a sports club. Aouf sent a request to the prefecture to obtain approval for the founding of the club. The response was negative, Aouf Ahmed being then twenty-six years old. He therefore wrote the name of Abdelmalek, his aunt's husband, so that his project would be accepted. Abdelrrahmane Aouf was summoned twice by the prefecture to examine the file concerning the creation of the Muslim club. During the interviews, Aouf convinced the municipality of the legitimacy of his project. Thus, he said that the club would aim to train young people for military service and explained: "green, paradise, red hell for others seeking training". The colonial authorities sent a note to the headquarters specifying that the club's premises should be used only for sporting purposes (in order to prohibit political gatherings)6. On August 31, 1921 (26 Dhou Al-Hijja 1339) the Mouloudia Club Algérois was created. Its headquarters are located at the American refreshment bar, Place Mahon, in Algiers.

=== The beginnings ===
In 1976, Mouloudia qualified for the African Cup of Champions Clubs for the first time in its history after winning the 1974–75 Algerian Championnat National. They reached the final after beating Al-Ahly Benghazi of Libya, Al Ahly of Egypt, Luo Union of Kenya and Enugu Rangers of Nigeria, respectively. In the final, they met Guinean club Hafia Conakry, who had won the last edition of the competition. In the first leg in Conakry, Mouloudia lost 3–0 and faced the difficult task of having to score three goals in the return leg. However, in the return leg, they managed to score the three goals with a brace from Omar Betrouni and a goal from Zoubir Bachi. They went on to win the penalty shootout 4–1 to win their first African title and also become the first Algerian club to win a continental competition.

== Crest ==
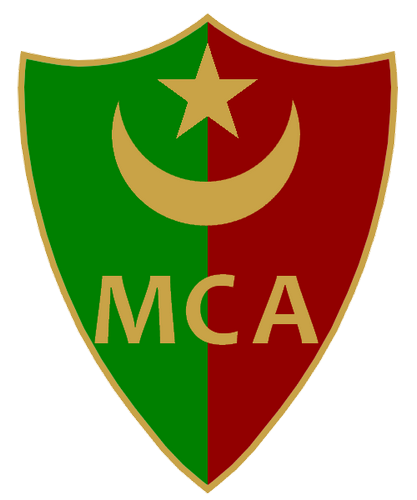
Former logo

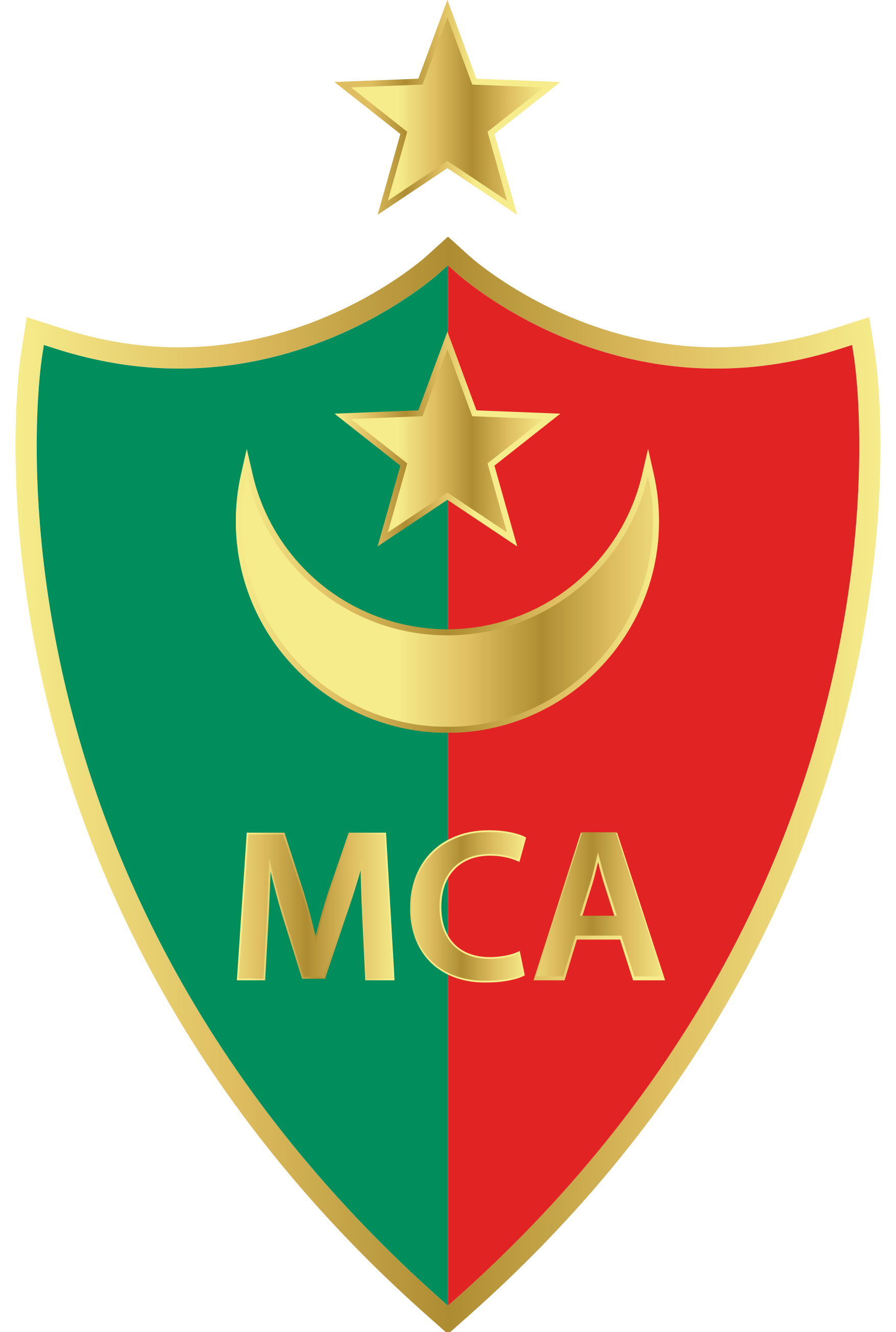
Old logo (2018-2024)

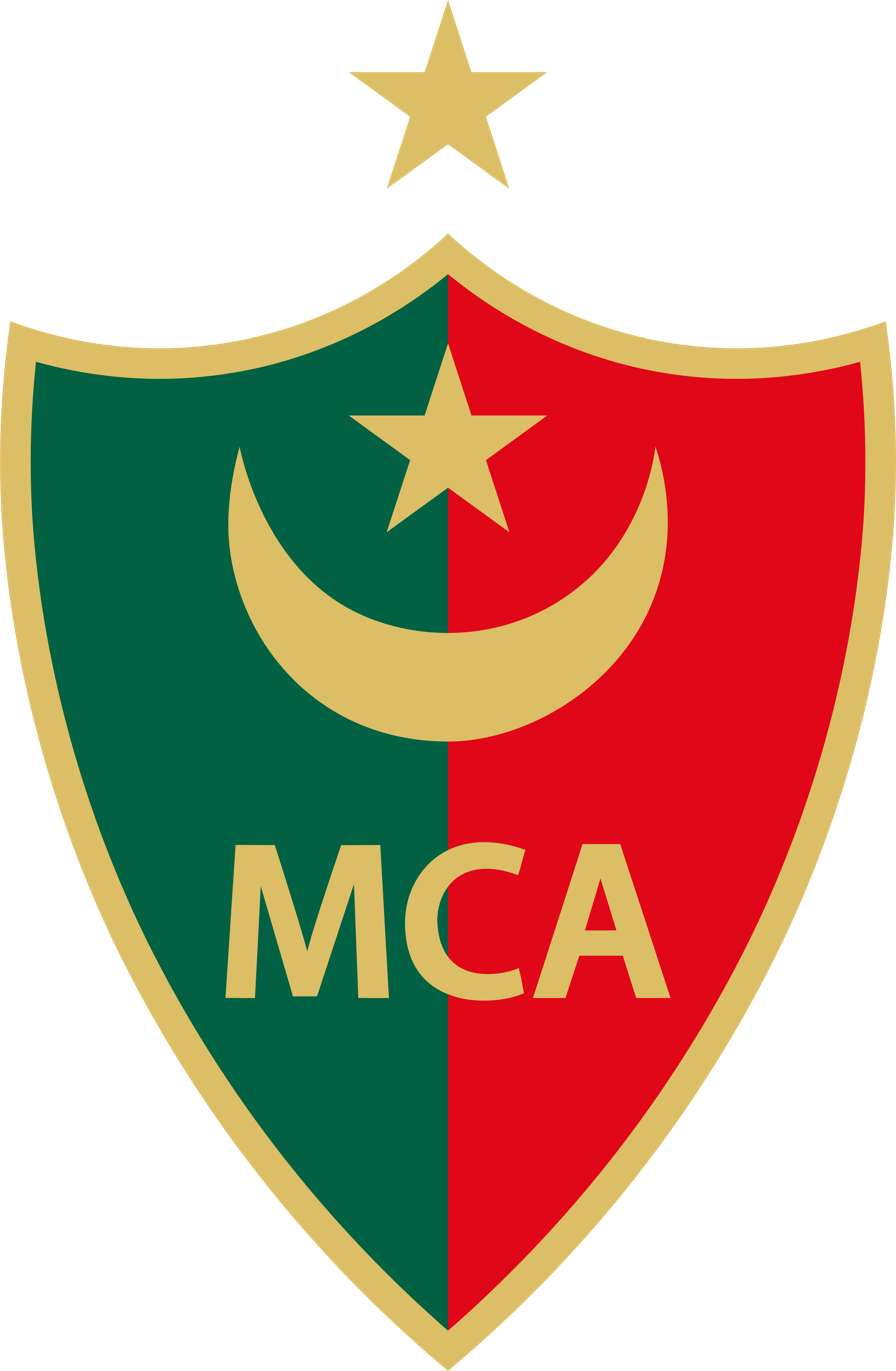
Current logo (updated in 2024)

== Kit manufacturers ==
Kit suppliers
| Dates | Supplier |
|---|---|
| 2009–2012 | Adidas |
| 2012–2016 | Joma |
| 2016–2019 | Umbro |
| 2019–2021 | Puma |
| 2021–2023 | Joma |
| 2023–2025 | Puma |
| 2025 | Peak Sport Products |

== Honours ==
=== Domestic competitions ===
- Algerian League 1
  - Champions (10): 1971–72, 1974–75, 1975–76, 1977–78, 1978–79, 1998–99, 2009–10, 2023–24, 2024–25, 2025–26
  - Runners-up (5): 1962–63, 1969–70, 1988–89, 2016–17, 2019–20
- Algerian Cup
  - Winners (8): 1970–71, 1972–73, 1975–76, 1982–83, 2005–06, 2006–07, 2013–14, 2015–16
  - Runners-up (2): 2012–13, 2023–24
- Algerian Super Cup
  - Winners (5) (record): 2006, 2007, 2014, 2024, 2025
  - Runner-up (3): 1972, 1973, 2016
- Algerian League Cup
  - Winners (1): 1998

=== International competitions ===
- CAF Cup of Champions Clubs
  - Winners (1): 1976

=== Regional competitions ===
- Maghreb Cup Winners Cup
  - Winners (2): 1971, 1974
- North African Cup of Champions
  - Runners-up (1): 2010
- Maghreb Champions Cup
  - Runners-up (1): 1975

== Performance in CAF competitions ==
- African Cup of Champions Clubs / CAF Champions League: 10 appearances
  1976 – Champion
  1977 – Quarter-finals
  1979 – Second Round
  1980 – Quarter-finals
  2000 – First Round
  2011 – Group stage
  2018 – Group stage
  2021 – Quarter – finals
  2025 – Quarter-finals
  2026 – Group stage 3^{rd}
  2027 – Group stage (in progress)
- CAF Confederation Cup: 4 appearances
  2007 – First Round
  2008 – First Round
  2015 – First Round
  2017 – Quarter-finals
- CAF Cup Winners' Cup: 1 appearance
  1984 – Second Round

MC Alger in African football

== Players ==
Algerian teams are limited to four foreign players. The squad list includes only the principal nationality of each player;

=== Current squad ===
As of 31 August 2026 Note: Flags indicate national team as defined under FIFA eligibility rules; some limited exceptions apply. Players may hold more than one non-FIFA nationality.

| No. | Pos. | Nation | Player |
|---|---|---|---|
| 1 | GK | ALG | Abdelatif Ramdane |
| 2 | DF | ALG | Yakoub Gassi |
| 3 | DF | ALG | Marwane Khelif |
| 4 | MF | ALG | Abdelouahab Satta |
| 5 | DF | ALG | Ayoub Abdellaoui (captain) |
| 6 | MF | ALG | Mohammed Benkhemassa |
| 7 | FW | ALG | Sofiane Bayazid |
| 8 | FW | ALG | Zinedine Ferhat |
| 10 | FW | JOR | Ali Azaizeh (on loan from Kazma) |
| 11 | FW | BDI | Mossi Nduwumwe (on loan from Singida) |
| 12 | MF | BFA | Mohamed Zougrana |
| 13 | FW | ALG | Yacine Hamadouche |
| 14 | FW | ALG | Ben Ahmed Kohili |
| 15 | FW | ALG | Mehdi Boucherit |

| No. | Pos. | Nation | Player |
|---|---|---|---|
| 16 | GK | ALG | Yassine Gourari Tebaa |
| 17 | MF | ALG | Chahreddine Boukholda |
| 18 | FW | GUI | Mohamed Saliou Bangoura |
| 19 | DF | ALG | Ayoub Ghezala |
| 20 | DF | ALG | Réda Halaïmia |
| 21 | MF | ALG | Mohamed Islam Abdelkader |
| 22 | FW | ALG | Siriman Konaté |
| 23 | MF | ALG | Merouane Mehdaoui |
| 24 | FW | ALG | Zakaria Naidji |
| 25 | DF | ALG | Aimen Bouguerra |
| 26 | DF | ALG | Yacine Chaib |
| 27 | DF | ALG | Abdelkader Menezla |
| 28 | MF | ALG | Oussama Benhaoua |
| 30 | GK | ALG | Mastias Hammache |

=== Out on loan ===
Note: Flags indicate national team as defined under FIFA eligibility rules; some limited exceptions apply. Players may hold more than one non-FIFA nationality.

| No. | Pos. | Nation | Player |
|---|---|---|---|
| — | FW | ALG | Moslem Anatouf (at CS Constantine until 30 June 2027) |

== Personnel ==
=== Current technical staff ===
| Position | Staff |
|---|---|
| Head coach | (Tunisia) Khaled Ben Yahia |
| Assistant coach | (Tunisia) Karim Delhoum |
| Goalkeeping coach | (Algeria) Azzedine Doukha |
| Fitness coach | (Tunisia) Ahmed Haddad |
| Fitness coach | (Tunisia) Yassine Bouassida |

== Notable players ==
Below are the notable former players who have represented Mouloudia in league and international competition since the club's foundation in 1921. To appear in the section below, a player must have played in at least 100 official matches for the club or represented the national team for which the player is eligible during his stint with Mouloudia or following his departure.

Algeria

- (Algeria) Zoubir Bachi
- (Algeria) Fayçal Badji
- (Algeria) Mohamed Belgherbi
- (Algeria) Lakhdar Belloumi
- (Algeria) Ali Bencheikh
- (Algeria) Omar Betrouni
- (Algeria) Hadj Bouguèche
- (Algeria) Ismaël Bouzid
- (Algeria) Noureddine Daham
- (Algeria) Farès Fellahi
- (Algeria) Rachid Sebbar
- (Algeria) Aissa Draoui
- (Algeria) Abdelmalek Cherrad
- (Algeria) Kader Firoud
- (Algeria) Fodil Hadjadj
- (Algeria) Larbi Hosni
- (Algeria) Karim Kaddour
- (Algeria) Hamza Koudri
- (Algeria) Tarek Lazizi
- (Algeria) Bouzid Mahyouz
- (Algeria) Fawzi Moussouni
- (Algeria) Amokrane Oualiken
- (Algeria) Rafik Saïfi
- (Algeria) Mohamed Lamine Zemmamouche
- (Algeria) Abdeslam Bousri
- (Algeria) Abdelwahab Maiche
- Youcef Belaïli

Mali

- (Mali) Moussa Coulibaly
- (Mali) Drissa Diakite

Togo

- (Togo) Mamam Cherif Touré

== Managers ==
- (Algeria) Mahmoud Hamid Bacha, Mustapha Biskri (1998)
- (Algeria) Abdelhamid Kermali, Mustapha Biski (1983–89), (1998–1999)
- (Belgium) Michel Renquin (2000–2001)
- (Algeria) Bachir Mechri, Ali Bencheikh, Bachta (2001–2002)
- (Algeria) Noureddine Saâdi (2002– Dec 4, 2003)
- (France) Hervé Revelli (Jan 1, 2004 – May 1, 2004)
- (France) Jean-Paul Rabier (2004–05)
- (France) Robert Nouzaret (July 1, 2005 – Dec 24, 2005)
- (Algeria) Noureddine Saâdi (Dec 2005 – March 2006)
- (France) François Bracci (March 2006 – Oct 06)
- (Algeria) Hacène Matallah (Oct 2006 – Nov 06)
- (Italy) Enrico Fabbro (Nov 2006 – Nov 07)
- (Belgium) Jean Thissen (Nov 2007 – Jan 08)
- (Italy) Enrico Fabbro (Jan 2008 – Feb 08)
- (Algeria) Mohamed Mekhazni (Feb 2008 – March 8)
- (Iraq) Ameur Djamil (March 27, 2008 – Sept 21, 2008)
- (France) Alain Michel (Sept 21, 2008 – Dec 09)
- (France) François Bracci (Dec 2009–10)
- (France) Alain Michel (June 2010 – March 15, 2011)
- (Algeria) Noureddine Zekri (March 11, 2011 – July 19, 2011)
- (Algeria) Abdelhak Menguellati (June 2011 – Aug 11)
- (Algeria) Abdelhak Benchikha (Sept 1, 2011 – Oct 5, 2011)
- (France) François Bracci (Oct 23, 2011 – Feb 11, 2012)
- (Algeria) Kamel Bouhellal (Feb 10, 2012 – May 5, 2012)
- (Algeria) Abdelkrim Bira (May 4, 2012 – June 30, 2012)
- (France) Patrick Liewig (July 1, 2012 – Aug 20, 2012)
- (France) Jean-Paul Rabier (Aug 27, 2012 – Sept 23, 2012)
- (Algeria) Djamel Menad (Sept 24, 2012 – May 9, 2013)
- (Algeria) Farid Zemiti (interim) (May 10, 2013 – June 30, 2013)
- (Switzerland) Alain Geiger (July 1, 2013 – Nov 10, 2013)
- (Algeria) Fouad Bouali (Nov 18, 2013–14)
- (Portugal) Artur Jorge (2014 – October 8, 2015)
- (Algeria) Meziane Ighil (October 13, 2015– February 2016)
- (Algeria) Lotfi Amrouche (Mars, 2016 – May 27, 2016)
- (Algeria) Djamel Menad (June, 2016– October, 2016)
- (Algeria) Kamel Mouassa (October, 2016– July, 2017)
- (France) Bernard Casoni (August, 2017– August, 2018)
- (Algeria) Rafik Saifi (September 15, 2018– October 23, 2018)
- (Algeria) Adel Amrouche (October, 2018– March 12, 2019)
- (France) Bernard Casoni (July, 2019– December 8, 2019)
- (Algeria) Mohamed Mekhazni (December 8, 2019– February 5, 2020)
- (Algeria) Nabil Neghiz (February 5, 2020 – February 4, 2021)
- (Algeria) Abdelkader Amrani (February 7, 2021 – April 12, 2021)
- (Algeria) Nabil Neghiz (April 28, 2021 –August 10, 2021)
- (Tunisia) Khaled Ben Yahia (September 1, 2021 –June 10, 2022)
- (Bosnia and Herzegovina) Faruk Hadžibegić (July 16, 2022 –September 10, 2022)
- (Tunisia) Faouzi Benzarti (September 25, 2022 –February, 2023)
- (France) Patrice Beaumelle (March 3, 2023 –Dec 16, 2024)
