= Reunion F.C. =

Kenyan football club

Reunion F.C. is a former Kenyan Premier League club, created from the renaming of Luo Union Football Club in the 1980, in the wake of a purge instigated by the attorney general, Charles Njonjo, against tribally divisive clubs and organizations. They are currently participating in the Nairobi Provincial League, as they resurrect from the bad run that saw them relegated to the lower division.

== History ==
The club known then as Luo Union F.C. and, subsequently Luo United F.C., was founded in 1957 in Mwanza, Tanzania, as a welfare club of Luo Union, East Africa. Most of the players were working with Tanganyika Plantation Company in Mwanza. The club changed its name to Reunion in 1980. They won the Premier League in 1964 and 1975 and the FA Cup in 1964, 1965 and 1966. It was also the first Kenyan Club to win the East and Central Club Championship (1976 and 1977). Former Kenya Prime Minister Raila Odinga is said to have once been on the books at Reunion in the 1960s.
