= Maghreb Cup Winners Cup =

- Founded: 1969
- Region: Maghreb (UMF)
- Teams: 4
- Current champions: (Tunisia) ES Sahel
- Most championships: (Algeria) MC Alger (2 times)

The Maghreb Cup Winners Cup was a North African football competition organized by the Union Maghrebine de Football (UMF) and which regrouped the cup winners from Algeria, Morocco, Tunisia and Libya (only in the first edition). Mauritania at this time was not a part of the Maghreb, so their clubs did not participate.

== Winners ==
Year	Host city	Final			Third Place Match		
Year	Host city	Champion	Score	Second Place	Third Place	Score	Fourth Place
1970; Details	(Morocco) Casablanca	(Morocco) RS Settat	1 – 0	(Algeria) USM Alger	(Tunisia) Club Africain	1 – 1 ( – ) penalties	(Libya) Al-Hilal SC
1971; Details	(Tunisia) Tunis	(Tunisia) Club Africain	2 – 0	(Tunisia) AS Marsa	(Morocco) Wydad AC Casablanca	3 – 1	(Algeria) USM Alger
1972; Details	(Algeria) Algiers	(Algeria) MC Alger	1 – 0	(Tunisia) Club Africain	(Morocco) FAR Rabat	4 – 2	(Tunisia) ES Tunis
1973; Details	(Morocco) Casablanca	(Morocco) SCC Mohammédia	1 – 0	(Tunisia) Club Africain	(Algeria) MC Alger	3 – 0	(Algeria) Hamra Annaba
1974; Details	(Tunisia) Tunis	(Algeria) MC Alger	1 – 1 (4 – 2) penalties	(Morocco) FUS Rabat	(Tunisia) AS Marsa	1 – 1 ( – ) penalties	(Morocco) SCC Mohammédia
1975; Details	(Morocco) Casablanca	(Tunisia) ES Sahel	0 – 0 (4 – 3) penalties	(Morocco) SCC Mohammédia	(Algeria) MC Alger / (Algeria) MO Constantine		

== Winners by team ==
Rank	Club	Winners	Runners-up	Third
1	(Algeria) MC Alger	2	0	2
2	(Tunisia) Club Africain	1	2	1
3	(Morocco) SCC Mohammédia	1	1	0
4	(Morocco) RS Settat	1	0	0
4	(Tunisia) ES Sahel	1	0	0
6	(Tunisia) AS Marsa	0	1	1
7	(Algeria) USM Alger	0	1	0
7	(Morocco) FUS Rabat	0	1	0
9	(Algeria) MO Constantine	0	0	1
9	(Morocco) FAR Rabat	0	0	1
9	(Morocco) Wydad AC Casablanca	0	0	1

== Winners by country ==
Rank	Club	Winners	Runners-up	Third
1	Tunisia	2	3	2
2	Morocco	2	2	2
3	Algeria	2	1	2

== See also ==
- Maghreb Champions Cup
