= Zoubir Bachi =

Algerian footballer (born 1950)

Personal information
- Full name: Zoubir Bachi
- Date of birth: January 12, 1950 (age 76)
- Place of birth: El Biar, Algiers, Algeria

Youth career
- 1960–1962: SCU El Biar
- 1962–1967: JS El Biar
- 1967–1968: MC Alger

Senior career*
| Years | Team | Apps | (Gls) |
| 1968–1979 | MC Alger | 235 | (51) |
| 1979–1980 | Charleroi | - | (-) |
| 1979–1980 | US Santé | - | (-) |
| 1983–1984 | JS El Biar | - | (-) |

International career
| 1968 | Algeria U20 | 1 | (0) |
| 1973–1975 | Algeria | 5 | (0) |
- * Club domestic league appearances and goals

Zoubir Bachi (born January 12, 1950) is a retired Algerian football player. He spent the majority of his career with his hometown club of MC Alger, whom he helped win a historic treble in 1976 (Algerian League, Algerian Cup and African Cup Of Champions Clubs), even scoring a goal in the final of the 1976 African Cup of Champions Clubs. He was also an Algerian international and had 5 caps for the Algerian National Team.

== Honours ==
- Won the Algerian Championnat National three times with MC Alger in 1972, 1975 and 1976
- Won the Algerian Cup three times with MC Alger in 1975, 1976 and 1978
- Won the Maghreb Cup Winners Cup two times with MC Alger in 1971 and 1974
- Won the African Cup Of Champions Clubs once with MC Alger in 1976
