= Bouzid Mahiouz =

Algerian footballer (born 1952)

Personal information
- Full name: Bouzid Mahiouz
- Date of birth: 13 January 1952 (age 74)
- Place of birth: Algiers, Algeria
- Position: Defender

Senior career*
Years	Team	Apps	(Gls)
1970-1985	MC Alger	345	(15)

International career
1979–1980	Algeria Olympic	6	(0)
1971–1981	Algeria	27	(0)
Medal record
Representing Algeria
Men's Football
Gold medal – first place	1978 Algiers	Team competition
- * Club domestic league appearances and goals

Bouzid Mahiouz (born 13 January 1952) is an Algerian former international footballer who played as a defender. He represented Algeria in the 1980 Summer Olympics.
