= Ali Bencheikh =

Algerian footballer (born 1955)

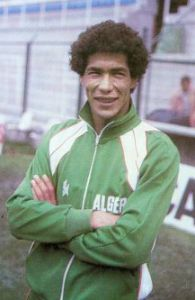
- Bencheikh in 1980

Personal information
- Date of birth: 9 January 1955 (age 71)
- Place of birth: El M'hir, Algeria
- Position: Midfielder

Youth career
- USM Alger
- MC Alger

Senior career*
| Years | Team | Apps | (Gls) |
| 1973–1978 | MC Alger | - | (-) |
| 1979–1980 | DNC Alger | 30 | (12) |
| 1980–1986 | MC Alger | - | (-) |
| 1986–1987 | JSM Chéraga | 28 | (9) |
| 1987–1988 | MC Alger | 27 | (1) |

International career
| 1976–1985 | Algeria | 47 | (6) |
- * Club domestic league appearances and goals

Ali "Alilou" Bencheikh (Arabic: علي بن شيخ; born 9 January 1955) is an Algerian former international footballer who played as a midfielder.

== Career ==
«Alilou», as he was known to the MC Alger fans, was born in the village of (at-waguag in the biban mountains of basse kabylie), close to the village of El M'hir daira of manssourah in the province of Bordj Bou Arreridj. He made his first team debut as a midfielder for MCA at age 17 and went on to win many trophies and awards on the way, including the club's only African Champions Cup in 1976. He was a member of the Algerian national team at the 1982 World Cup.

Alilou was 19th in IFFHS voting for the African player of the century.

- 1973–1988 MC Alger
- 1979–1980 DNC Alger
- 1986–1987 JSM Chéraga

== Honours ==
MC Alger

- African Champions League: 1976
- Maghreb Cup Winners Cup: 1974
- Algerian League: 1975, 1976, 1978, 1979
- Algerian Cup: 1973, 1976, 1983

Algeria

- All-Africa Games: 1978
- Mediterranean Games bronze medal: 1979

Individual

- African Footballer of the Year: runner-up 1978; third 1976
