= Abdeslam Bousri =

Algerian footballer (born 1953)

Personal information
- Full name: Abdeslam Bousri
- Date of birth: 28 January 1953 (age 73)
- Place of birth: Jijel, Algeria
- Position: Forward

Senior career*
Years	Team	Apps	(Gls)
1972–1987	MC Alger	370	(164)
1983–1984	Olympique de Médéa		
1987–1988	ESM Koléa		

International career
1977–1983	Algeria	8	(2)
- * Club domestic league appearances and goals

Abdeslam Bousri (born 28 January 1953) is an Algeria international former football forward who played for MC Alger.

== Honours ==
- Won the African Champions League once with MC Alger in 1976
- Won the Algerian League 5 times with MC Alger in 1972, 1975, 1976, 1978 and 1979
- Won the Algerian Cup 3 times with MC Alger in 1973, 1976 and 1983
- Finished as the top scorer of the Algerian League 4 times with MC Alger in 1978 (14 goals), 1979 (11 goals), 1982 (16 goals) and 1983 (19 goals)
