= 2005–06 MC Alger season =

MC Alger
2005–06 season
- President: Mohamed Messaoudi
- Head coach: Robert Nouzaret (until 23 December 2005); Noureddine Saâdi (from 11 January 2006) (until 14 April 2006); François Bracci (from 12 May 2006)
- Stadium: Stade 5 Juillet 1962
- National 1: 6th
- Algerian Cup: Winner
- Arab Champions League: Quarter-finals
- Top goalscorer: League: Noureddine Daham (13 goals); All: Noureddine Daham (22 goals)

In the 2005–06 season, MC Alger competed in the National 1 for the 35th season, as well as the Algerian Cup and the Arab Champions League. It was their third consecutive season in the top flight of Algerian football.

== Squad list ==
Players and squad numbers last updated on 6 August 2005.
Note: Flags indicate national team as has been defined under FIFA eligibility rules. Players may hold more than one non-FIFA nationality.

No.	Name	Nat.	Position	Date of Birth (Age)	Signed from
Goalkeepers
1	(Algeria)	Merouane Abdouni	GK	27 March 1981 (aged 24)	(Algeria) USM Alger
30	(Algeria)	Sofiane Azzedine	GK	24 September 1980 (aged 24)	(Algeria) JSM Béjaïa
16	(Algeria)	Lazrag Benfissa	GK	12 January 1980 (aged 25)	(Algeria) WA Tlemcen
Defenders
5	(Algeria)	Smail Chaoui	CB	11 February 1982 (aged 23)	(Algeria) ASO Chlef
15	(Algeria)	Réda Babouche	LB	3 July 1979 (aged 26)	(Algeria) MO Constantine
12	(Mali)	Moussa Coulibaly	RB	19 May 1981 (aged 24)	(Mali) AS Bamako
4	(Algeria)	Kamel Bouacida	CB	6 August 1976 (aged 29)	(Algeria) USM Annaba
28	(Algeria)	Sofiane Belaïd	CB	5 February 1985 (aged 20)	(Algeria) Reserve team
22	(Mali)	Drissa Diakité	RB	18 February 1985 (aged 20)	(Mali) Djoliba AC
20	(Algeria)	Ismaël Bouzid	CB	21 July 1983 (aged 22)	(Germany) Union Berlin
Midfielders
10	(Algeria)	Fodil Hadjadj	DM	18 April 1983 (aged 22)	(France) FC Nantes
6	(Algeria)	Zoubir Zmit	CM	11 June 1975 (aged 30)	(Algeria) USM Blida
21	(Algeria)	Kamel Maouche	LM	17 May 1977 (aged 28)	(Algeria) USM Blida
7	(Algeria)	Ammar Largot	AM	5 February 1980 (aged 25)	(Algeria) SA Mohammadia
23	(Algeria)	Yacine Hammadou	AM	7 September 1980 (aged 24)	(Algeria) USM Annaba
8	(Algeria)	Faycal Badji	AM	15 February 1973 (aged 32)	(Algeria) CR Belouizdad
Forwards
29	(Algeria)	Sofiane Younes	LW	25 November 1982 (aged 22)	(Algeria) USM El Harrach
19	(Algeria)	Hadj Bouguèche	ST	7 December 1983 (aged 21)	(Algeria) USM Blida
9	(Algeria)	Mohamed Badache	ST	15 October 1976 (aged 28)	(Algeria) USM Blida
17	(Mali)	Rafan Sidibé	ST	12 March 1984 (aged 21)	(Mali) Stade Malien
11	(Algeria)	Noureddine Daham	ST	15 November 1977 (aged 27)	(Algeria) JS Kabylie
14	(Algeria)	Karim Braham Chaouch	ST	17 July 1978 (aged 27)	(Algeria) JSM Chéraga

== Transfers ==
=== In ===
==== Summer ====
Date	Pos	Player	From club	Transfer fee	Source
1 July 2005	GK	(Algeria) Merouane Abdouni	USM Alger	Free transfer	
1 July 2005	GK	(Algeria) Sofiane Azzedine	JSM Béjaïa	Free transfer	
1 July 2005	LW	(Algeria) Sofiane Younes	USM El Harrach	Free transfer	
1 July 2005	DF	(Algeria) Rafik Boudiaf	SA Mohammadia	Free transfer	
1 July 2005	MF	(Algeria) Ammar Largot	SA Mohammadia	Free transfer	
1 July 2005	ST	(Algeria) Mohamed Badache	USM Blida	Free transfer	
1 July 2005	DF	(Algeria) Smail Chaoui	ASO Chlef	Free transfer	
1 July 2005	MF	(Algeria) Yacine Hammadou	USM El Harrach	Free transfer	
1 July 2005	ST	(Algeria) Hadj Bouguèche	USM Blida	Free transfer	
1 July 2005	MF	(Algeria) Zoubir Zmit	USM Blida	Free transfer	
1 July 2005	MF	(Algeria) Fodil Hadjadj	(France) FC Nantes	Free transfer	
1 July 2005	DF	(Algeria) El Ghali Belahouel	ASO Chlef	Free transfer	
21 September 2005	DF	(Algeria) Ismaël Bouzid	(Germany) Union Berlin	Free transfer	

==== Winter ====
Date	Pos	Player	From club	Transfer fee	Source
1 January 2006	GK	(Algeria) Mohamed Réda Ouamane	MC Oran	Free transfer	
1 January 2006	GK	(Algeria) Aziz Makhlouf	US Chaouia	Free transfer	
1 January 2006	RB	(Algeria) Hillal Mekesser	USM El Harrach	Free transfer	

=== Out ===
==== Summer ====
Date	Pos	Player	To club	Transfer fee	Source
1 July 2005	GK	(Algeria) Khaled Hammoutène	SKAF Khemis Miliana	Free transfer	
1 July 2005	DF	(Algeria) Abdelaziz Benhamlat	RC Kouba	Free transfer	
1 July 2005	GK	(Algeria) Karim Saoula	USM Alger	Free transfer	
1 July 2005	DF	(Algeria) Abdelkader Larbi Bouamrane	MSP Batna	Free transfer	
1 July 2005	DF	(Algeria) Mounir Amrane	ES Sétif	Free transfer	
1 July 2005	DF	(Algeria) Yacine Kechout	MO Béjaïa	Free transfer	
1 July 2005	?	(Algeria) Réda Dellalou	JSM Béjaïa	Free transfer	
1 July 2005	DM	(Algeria) Mourad Fodili	US Chaouia	Free transfer	
1 July 2005	MF	(Algeria) Brahim Ouahid	USM El Harrach	Free transfer	
1 July 2005	MF	(Algeria) Ameur Benali	MO Constantine	Free transfer	
1 July 2005	FW	(Algeria) Fares Djabelkheir	CS Constantine	Free transfer	
1 July 2005	FW	(Algeria) Tahar Bouraba	WR Bentalha	Free transfer	

==== Winter ====
Date	Pos	Player	To club	Transfer fee	Source
1 January 2006	GK	(Algeria) Lazrag Benfissa	WA Tlemcen	Free transfer	
1 January 2006	DF	(Algeria) El Ghali Belahouel	ASO Chlef	Free transfer	
1 January 2006	MF	(Algeria) Ali Boukaroum	IB Khémis El Khechna	Loan	
1 January 2006	MF	(Algeria) Mohamed Yacine Si Keddour	NA Hussein Dey	Free transfer	
1 January 2006	FW	(Algeria) Karim Braham Chaouch	JSM Béjaïa	Loan	
30 January 2006	RB	(Algeria) Drissa Diakité	(France) Nice	Undisclosed	

== Competitions ==
=== Overview ===
Competition	Record								Started round	Final position / round	First match	Last match
Competition	G	W	D	L	GF	GA	GD	Win %	Started round	Final position / round	First match	Last match
Division 1	30	13	5	12	42	35	+7	43.33	—	6th	25 August 2005	25 May 2006
Algerian Cup	6	6	0	0	13	5	+8	100.00	Round of 64	Winner	30 December 2005	15 June 2006
Arab Champions League	6	4	0	2	11	6	+5	66.67	Round of 32	Quarter-Finals	14 September 2005	20 February 2006
Total	42	23	5	14	66	46	+20	54.76				

=== Division 1 ===
==== League table ====
Pos	Team	Pld	W	D	L	GF	GA	GD	Pts	Qualification or relegation
4	ES Sétif	30	14	5	11	30	26	+4	47	2006–07 Arab Champions League
5	CA Bordj Bou Arreridj	30	13	7	10	22	24	−2	46	2006–07 Arab Champions League
6	MC Alger	30	13	5	12	42	35	+7	44	2007 CAF Confederation Cup
7	Paradou AC	30	11	7	12	36	38	−2	40	
8	CR Belouizdad	30	11	7	12	30	31	−1	40	

Source: DZFOOT.COM
Rules for classification: 1) points; 2) goal difference; 3) number of goals scored.

==== Results summary ====
Overall								Home						Away					
Pld	W	D	L	GF	GA	GD	Pts	W	D	L	GF	GA	GD	W	D	L	GF	GA	GD
0	0	0	0	0	0	0	0	0	0	0	0	0	0	0	0	0	0	0	0

Last updated: 11 June 2007.
Source: Competitive matches

==== Results by round ====
Round	1	2	3	4	5	6	7	8	9	10	11	12	13	14	15	16	17	18	19	20	21	22	23	24	25	26	27	28	29	30
Ground	H	A	H	A	H	A	H	A	H	A	H	A	H	A	H	A	H	A	H	A	H	A	H	A	H	A	H	A	H	A
Result	L	W	W	L	W	D	D	L	W	L	W	L	L	L	W	L	L	W	W	L	W	L	W	D	D	L	W	W	D	W
Position																														

Source: Competitive matches
A = Away; H = Home; W = Win; D = Draw; L = Loss

==== Matches ====
25 August 2005 Round 1	MC Alger	1–3	ASO Chlef	Algiers
	Daham 90'		Messaoud 10' (pen.), 18', 85'	Stadium: Stade du 5 Juillet; Referee: Benaissa, Bourouis, Djezzar
Note: Lineup for MC Alger - Benfissa, Belaid Sofiane (Badache 63'), Baâbouche (Chaoui 43'), Bouacida (c), Coulibaly, Diakité, Zemit, Hadjadj, Daham, Badji, Sidibé (Braham Chaouch 46') - Coach: Nouzaret Robert

19 September 2005 (Note: The match was originally to be played on 8 September 2005, but it was postponed.) Round 2	MC Oran	1–3	MC Alger	Oran
	Berradja 85'		Badache 69', 82'; Braham Chaouch 71'	Stadium: Stade Ahmed Zabana; Referee: Boukedjar, Djahnine, Chnaoua
Note: Lineup for MC Alger - Abdouni, Belaid Sofiane, Chaoui (Baâbouche 88'), Bouacida (c), Coulibaly, Boudiaf, Diakité, Zemit, Badache (Badji 83'), Hamadou, Daham (Braham Chaouch 65') - Coach: Nouzaret Robert

3 October 2005 (Note: The match was originally to be played on 15 September 2005, but it was postponed.) Round 3	MC Alger	3–1	CA Bordj Bou Arreridj	Algiers
	Braham Chaouch 15' (pen.), 82'; Daham 90'		Kheddara 5'	Stadium: Stade du 5 Juillet; Referee: Belkacem, Ouadah, Deffar
Note: Lineup for MC Alger - Abdouni, Largot (Baâbouche 68'), Boudiaf, Bouacida (c), Coulibaly, Diakité, Badache (Daham 60'), Hamadou (Hadjadj 46'), Braham Chaouch, Badji, Bouguèche - Coach: Nouzaret Robert

22 September 2005 Round 4	USM Blida	2–1	MC Alger	Blida
	Touil 29'; Feham 53'		Daham 64'	Stadium: Stade Mustapha Tchaker; Referee: Zekrini, Talbi, Tahir
Note: Lineup for MC Alger - Abdouni, Belaid Sofiane, Chaoui, Bouacida (c), Coulibaly, Boudiaf (Baâbouche 58'), Diakité, Zemit, Badache (Braham Chaouch 62'), Hamadou, Sidibé (Daham 58') - Coach: Nouzaret Robert

14 November 2005 (Note: The match was originally to be played on 26 September 2005, but it was postponed.) Round 5	MC Alger	2–1	ES Sétif	Algiers
	Bouguèche 19'; Badji 25'		Keita 78' (pen.)	Stadium: Stade du 5 Juillet; Referee: Benouza, Kaid, Meknous Amine
Note: Lineup for MC Alger - Abdouni, Belaid Sofiane, Baâbouche, Boudiaf, Coulibaly, Hamadou (Zemit 38'), Largot (Sidibé 57'), Hadjadj, Daham, Badji (c) (Braham Chaouch 66'), Bouguèche - Coach: Nouzaret Robert

13 October 2005 Round 6	NA Hussein Dey	2–2	MC Alger	Algiers
	Alliche 58'; Gana 86' (pen.)		Daham 3'; Badji 38'	Stadium: Stade du 5 Juillet; Referee: Khelifi, Chaâbane, Belkalcem
Note: Lineup for MC Alger - Abdouni, Largot (Chaoui), Boudiaf, Bouacida (c), Coulibaly, Hadjadj (Zemit), Bouguèche (Baâbouche), Maouche, Daham, Badji, Braham Chaouch - Coach: Nouzaret Robert

20 October 2005 Round 7	MC Alger	1–1	USM Alger	Algiers
	Bouzid 18'		Eneramo 90+5'	Stadium: Stade 5 Juillet 1962; Referee: Douala, Hanafi, Khentache
Note: Lineup for MC Alger - Abdouni, Belaid Sofiane, Chaoui, Bouzid, Coulibaly, Zemit (Hadjadj 67'), Diakité, Hamadou (Bouguèche 86'), Maouche, Badji (c) (Boudiaf 63'), Daham - Coach: Nouzaret Robert

27 October 2005 Round 8	CA Batna	1–0	MC Alger	Batna
	Smida 45'			Stadium: Stade 1er Novembre 1954; Attendance: 0 (close doors); Referee: Mansouri, Benaboune, Belfekroune
Note: Lineup for MC Alger - Abdouni, Bouzid, Bâabouche, Bouacida (c), Coulibaly, Diakité, Zemit, Hamadou, Daham (Badache 46'), Badji (Braham Chaouch 46'), Maouche (Bouguèche 45') - Coach: Nouzaret Robert

10 November 2005 Round 9	MC Alger	3–0	US Biskra	Algiers
	Bouguèche 27', 33'; Badache 30'			Stadium: Stade du 5 Juillet; Referee: Haimoudi, Djezzar, Belebcir
Note: Lineup for MC Alger - Abdouni, Belaid Sofiane, Chaoui (Baâbouche 46'), Bouzid, Coulibaly, Diakité, Largot, Hadjadj, Badache (Zemit 81'), Badji (c) (Sidibé 77'), Bouguèche - Coach: Nouzaret Robert

5 December 2005 (Note: The match was originally to be played on 17 November 2005, but it was postponed.) Round 10	JS Kabylie	2–1	MC Alger	Tizi Ouzou
	Berguigua 40'; Oussalah 90'		Largot 47'	Stadium: Stade 1er Novembre 1954
Note: Lineup for MC Alger - Abdouni, Belaid, Chaoui, Bouacida (c) (Bouzid 37'), Coulibaly, Diakité, Largot (Bâabouche 80'), Hadjadj (Boudiaf 83'), Daham, Badji, Bouguèche - Coach: Nouzaret Robert

28 November 2005 Round 11	MC Alger	3–0	CS Constantine	Algiers
	Walid Tibermacine 52' (o.g.); Daham 71', 78'			Stadium: Stade du 5 Juillet; Referee: Belkacem, Ouadah, Deffar
Note: Lineup for MC Alger - Abdouni, Belaid Sofiane, Bâabouche (Younès 46'), Bouacida (c), Bouzid, Zemit, Largot (Braham Chaouch 46'), Diakité, Daham, Badji (Chaoui 75'), Bouguèche - Coach: Nouzaret Robert

1 December 2005 Round 12	USM Annaba	1–0	MC Alger	Annaba
	Bensaid 62'			Stadium: Stade 19 Mai 1956; Referee: Boukedjar, Djahnine, Ziad
Note: Lineup for MC Alger - Abdouni, Belaid Sofiane, Chaoui, Bouacida (c), Bouzid, Zemit (Diakité 71'), Younès (Daham 69'), Hadjadj, Badache, Braham Chaouch, Bouguèche (Largot 68') - Coach: Nouzaret Robert

8 December 2005 Round 13	MC Alger	0–1	CR Belouizdad	Algiers
			Amroune 54'	Stadium: Stade du 5 Juillet; Referee: Djaballah, Etchiali, Benmansour
Note: Lineup for MC Alger - Abdouni, Belaid Sofiane, Baâbouche (Braham Chaouch 65'), Bouzid, Coulibaly, Diakité (Maouche 30'), Largot, Zemit (Hamadou 79'), Daham, Badji (c), Bouguèche - Coach: Nouzaret Robert

15 December 2005 Round 14	WA Tlemcen	3–2	MC Alger	Tlemcen
	Benmoussa 44' (pen.); Tounkob 47'; Taleb 50'		Badache 43'; Daham 80'	Stadium: Stade des "Frères Zerga; Referee: Benaissa, Bourouis, Chnaoua
Note: Lineup for MC Alger - Abdouni, Belaid Sofiane, Chaoui, Coulibaly, Bouzid, Hadjadj, Largot (Hamadou 37'), Zemit, Daham, Badji (c), Bouguèche (Badache 35') - Coach: Nouzaret Robert

23 December 2005 Round 15	MC Alger	2–0	Paradou AC	Algiers
	Badache 10'; Daham 63'			Stadium: Stade du 5 Juillet; Referee: Bichari, Talbi, Achrouf
Note: Lineup for MC Alger - Abdouni, Chaoui, Baâbouche, Bouzid, Coulibaly, Zemit, Badache (Younès 79'), Hadjadj, Daham (Largot 90') Badji (c), Bouguèche - Coach: Meguellati Abdelhak

19 January 2006 Round 16	ASO Chlef	1–0	MC Alger	Chlef
	Messaoud 70'			Stadium: Stade Mohamed Boumezrag; Referee: Boukedjar, Djahnine, Chnaoua
Note: Lineup for MC Alger - Abdouni, Chaoui Smail, Bouacida (c) (Belaid Sofiane 46'), Bouzid, Baâbouche, Zemit, Hamadou, Badji (Younès 79'), Largot (Maouche 62'), Badache, Buguèche - Coach: Saâdi Nouredine

26 January 2006 Round 17	MC Alger	1–2	MC Oran	Algiers
	Badache 13'		Boukessassa 63'; Berradja 76'	Stadium: Stade du 5 Juillet; Referee: Ouchène, Bermane, Debbiche
Note: Lineup for MC Alger - Abdouni, Largot (Younès 60'), Chaoui, Coulibaly, Bouzid, Zemit, Badache (Mekesser 46'), Hamadou, Daham, Badji (c), Bouguèche - Coach: Saâdi Noureddine

30 January 2006 Round 18	CA Bordj Bou Arreridj	1–2	MC Alger	Bordj Bou Arréridj
	Derbal 84'		Bouguèche 61'; Badache 90+2' (pen.)	Stadium: Stade 20 Août 1955; Referee: Haimoudi, Kerrai, Benchaia
Note: Lineup for MC Alger - Abdouni, Belaid Sofiane, Chaoui, Coulibaly, Bouzid, Zemit, Badache (Largot 90'), Boudiaf, Daham (c), Hamadou (Younès 85'), Bouguèche - Coach: Sâadi Nouredine

2 February 2006 Round 19	MC Alger	1–0	USM Blida	Algiers
	Badache 83' (pen.)			Stadium: Stade du 5 Juillet; Referee: Bichari, Tahir, Doulache
Note: Lineup for MC Alger - Abdouni, Belaid Sofiane (Sidibé 75'), Chaoui (Baâbouche 22'), Coulibaly, Bouzid, Zemit, Boudiaf, Daham (c), Badache, Hamadou (Largot 37'), Bouguèche - Coach: Sâadi Nouredine

6 March 2006 Round 20	ES Sétif	2–0	MC Alger	Sétif
	Benchaira 63'; Benounès 85'			Stadium: Stade 8 Mai 1945; Referee: Belkacem, Ouaddah, Belkheïr
Note: Lineup for MC Alger - Abdouni, Boudiaf, Baâbouche, Bouzid, Bouacida (c), Zemit, Hamadou, Bouguèche, Badache (Si Kaddour 68'), Daham - Coach: Sâadi Nouredine

24 February 2006 Round 21	MC Alger	2–1	NA Hussein Dey	Algiers
	Badache 26'; Daham 70' (pen.)		Gana 55' (pen.)	Stadium: Stade du 5 Juillet; Referee: Aouiti, Bitam, Abdouni
Note: Lineup for MC Alger - Abdouni, Chaoui, Baâbouche, Coulibaly, Bouzid, Zemit, Badache (Boudiaf 78'), Hadjadj (Younès 65'), Daham (c) (Largot 90'), Hamadou, Bouguèche - Coach: Sâadi Nouredine

9 March 2006 Round 22	USM Alger	1–0	MC Alger	Algiers
	Metref 10'			Stadium: Stade 5 Juillet 1962; Referee: Touati Djaballah, Etchiali, Benmansour
Note: Lineup for MC Alger - Abdouni, Zemit (Chaoui 53'), Baâbouche, Bouzid, Coulibaly, Hadjadj (Largot 76'), Badache, Hamadou, Daham, Badji (c) (Younès 62'), Bouguèche - Coach: Sâadi Nouredine

16 March 2006 Round 23	MC Alger	3–2	CA Batna	Algiers
	Daham 4', 72'; Bouguèche 85'		Smida 66'; Dob Mounir 76'	Stadium: Stade du 5 Juillet; Referee: Boukedjar, Djahnine, Chnaoua
Note: Lineup for MC Alger - Azzedine, Mekesser (Largot 79'), Baâbouche, Bouacida (c), Bouzid, Hamadou, Younès (Badache 60'), Zemit, Daham, Maouche (Hadjadj 66'), Bouguèche - Coach: Sâadi Nouredine

23 March 2006 Round 24	US Biskra	0–0	MC Alger	Biskra
				Stadium: 18 February Stadium; Attendance: 0 (close doors); Referee: Mehidi, Haimoudi, Belfekroune
Note: Lineup for MC Alger - Abdouni, Chaoui, Baâbouche, Bouacida (c), Coulibaly, Hamadou, Badache (Hadjadj 69'), Zemit, Daham, Maouche (Boudiaf 69'), Bouguèche (Si Kaddour 82') - Coach: Sâadi Nouredine

8 May 2006 Round 25	MC Alger	1–1	JS Kabylie	Algiers
	Bouguèche 83'		Yacef 75'	Stadium: Stade du 5 Juillet; Referee: Haimoudi
Note: Lineup for MC Alger - Abdouni, Chaoui, Zemit, Bouacida (c), Coulibaly, Hadjadj, Younès (Largot 82'), Maouche, Daham, Badji (Bouzid 80'), Bouguèche - Coach: Bracci François

13 April 2006 Round 26	CS Constantine	2–1	MC Alger	Constantine
	Derrahi 32' (pen.); Djabelkheir 54'		Coulibaly 9'	Stadium: Ramadane Ben Abdelmalek Stadium; Referee: Benaissa, Saker, Bourouis
Note: Lineup for MC Alger - Azzedine, Chaoui, Bâabouche (Hadjadj 66'), Coulibaly, Bouacida (c), Bouzid, Zemit, Boudiaf (Bouguèche 46'), Daham, Younès (Badache 46'), Maouche - Coach: Sâadi Nouredine

20 April 2006 Round 27	MC Alger	2–1	USM Annaba	Algiers
	Daham 51'; Bouguèche 66'		Bensaid 90'	Stadium: Stade du 5 Juillet; Referee: Belkacem. Ouaddah, Belkheir
Note: Lineup for MC Alger - Azzedine, Belaid Sofiane, Bâabouche, Coulibaly, Bouzid, Hadjadj, Younès (Boudiaf 80'), Maouche (Zemit 74'), Daham, Badji (c) (Badache 69'), Bouguèche - Coach: Meguellati Abdelhak

15 May 2006 Round 28	CR Belouizdad	1–2	MC Alger	Algiers
	Aoudia 88'		Younès 76'; Zemit 84' (pen.)	Stadium: Stade du 5 Juillet; Referee: Benouza, Laid, Oukil
Note: Lineup for MC Alger - Abdouni, Largot, Baâbouche, Coulibaly, Bouzid, Bouacida (c) (Belaid Sofiane 86'), Younès, Hadjadj (Boudiaf 82'), Zemit, Badji (Hamadou 69'), Bouguèche - Coach: Bracci François

18 May 2006 Round 29	MC Alger	0–0	WA Tlemcen	Algiers
				Stadium: Stade du 5 Juillet; Referee: Boukedjar, Belbecir, Debbiche
Note: Lineup for MC Alger - Abdouni, Belaid Sofiane (Mekesser), Baâbouche, Bouacida (c), Chaoui, Hadjadj, Zemit (Si Kaddour 75'), Hamadou (Boudiaf 81'), Daham, Maouche, Younès - Coach: Bracci François

25 May 2006 Round 30	Paradou AC	1–3	MC Alger	Reghaïa
	Touati 81'		Daham 36'; Badji 56'; Younes 58'	Stadium: Stadium shaheed Bourada boualem Referee: Amalou, Talbi, Boukhlifa
Note: Lineup for MC Alger - Azzedine, Chaoui, Baâbouche, Bouzid, Coulibaly, Largot (Boudiaf 82'), Younès, Hadjadj (Zemit 66'), Daham, Badji (Badache 70'), Bouguèche - Coach: Bracci François

=== Algerian Cup ===
30 December 2005 Round of 64	MC Alger	2–1	IRB Sidi Aissa	Bouïra
	Maouche 18'; Largot 37'			Stadium: Stade Rabah Bitat; Referee: Amalou, Ibelaidène, Benali
Note: Lineup for MC Alger - Azzeddine, Belaïd Sofiane, Baâbouche (Boudiaf 69’), Chaoui, Coulibaly, Zemit, Hamadou, Maouche, Largot, Badji (c) (Younès 46’), Sidibé (Bouguèche 75’) - Coach: Abdelhak Meguellati

9 February 2006 Round of 32	MC Alger	2–1	CC Sig	Aïn Defla
	Sidibé 43'; Largot 88'		Boukraâ 68'	Stadium: Stade Khelal Abdelkader; Referee: Aouiti, Bitam, Abdouni
Note: Lineup for MC Alger - Azzedine, Belaïd Sofiane, Baâbouche (Hadjadj 62’), Coulibaly, Bouzid, Boudiaf, Hamadou (Largot 63’), Zemit (c), Badache (Younès Sofiane 80’), Maouche, Sidibé. - Coach: Noureddine Saâdi

2 March 2006 Round of 16	MC Alger	2–0	CRB Dar El Beïda	Rouïba
	Douar 12' (o.g.); Badji 85'			Stadium: Salem Mabrouki Stadium; Referee: Zekrini, Belagoune, Razi
Note: Lineup for MC Alger - Azzedine, Belaïd Sofiane (Largot 46’), Chaoui (Mekesser 85’), Bouzid, Coulibaly, Zemit, Younès (Hadjadj 45’), Hamadou, Badache, Badji (c), Bouguèche - Coach: Noureddine Saâdi

4 May 2006 Quarter-finals	ES Sétif	1–2	MC Alger	Bouïra
	Bourahli 90' (pen.)		Younès 38'; Badji 62'	Stadium: Stade Rabah Bitat; Referee: Mohamed Benouza
Note: Lineup for MC Alger - Abdouni, Chaoui (Belaïd 67’), Baâbouche, Bouacida (c), Coulibaly, Hadjadj, Younès, Maouche (Badache 67’), Daham, Badji (Boudiaf 86’), Bouguèche - Coach: François Bracci & Abdelhak Meguellati

8 June 2006 Semi-finals	MC Alger	3–1	WA Tlemcen	Mostaganem
	Younès 11'; Daham 66', 90'		Benyamina 89'	Stadium: Mohamed Bensaïd Stadium; Referee: Khelifi, Sedrati, Chaâbane
Note: Lineup for MC Alger - Abdouni, Chaoui, Baâbouche, Coulibaly, Bouacida (c), Zemit, Younes, Hadjadj (Maouche), Daham (Badache 90'+1), Badji, Bouguèche (Hamadou) - Coach: François Bracci

15 June 2006 Final	MC Alger	2–1	USM Alger	Algiers
16:00	Daham 42', 50' (pen.)		Doucouré 85'	Stadium: Stade 5 Juillet 1962; Referee: Djamel Haimoudi
Note: Lineup for MC Alger - Abdouni, Chaoui, Baâbouche, Bouacida (c), Coulibaly, Zmit, Younès, Badji, Daham, Hadjadj (Maouche 72’), Bouguèche (Hamadou 85’) - Coach: François Bracci

=== Arab Champions League ===
==== Round of 32 ====
14 September 2005 First leg	Al-Merreikh (Sudan)	1–0	(Algeria) MC Alger	Omdurman
:	Badredine Qalak 87'			Stadium: Al-Merrikh Stadium; Referee: Ahmed Aouda (Egypt); Assistant referees: Ahmed Abou El Ala, Nasser Sadek (Egypt)
Note: Lineup for MC Alger - Abdouni, Boudiaf, Baâbouche, Bouacida (c), Coulibaly, Diakité, Hamadou, Zemit, Daham (Badache, 81’), Hadjadj, Sidibé - Coach: Robert Nouzaret

26 September 2005 Second leg	MC Alger (Algeria)	2–0	(Sudan) Al-Merreikh	Algiers
:	Daham 4', 45+1'			Stadium: Stade du 5 Juillet; Referee: Abderrahim El Arjoun (Morocco); Assistant referees: Yahia Karkouri, Mohamed Ayoub (Morocco)
Note: Lineup for MC Alger - Abdouni, Largot (Sidibé 88’), Boudiaf, Bouacida (c), Coulibaly, Zemit, Diakité, Hamadou, Daham, Bouguèche, Braham Chaouch (Badache 69’) - Coach: Robert Nouzaret

==== Round of 16 ====
7 November 2005 First leg	MC Alger (Algeria)	3–0	(Iraq) Al-Zawraa	Algiers
:	Bouguèche 64'; Daham 73', 76'			Stadium: Stade du 5 Juillet; Referee: Essam Abdel-Fatah (Egypt); Assistant referees: Ahmed Abou Ala, Ibrahim Walid Ayoub (Egypt)
Note: Lineup for MC Alger - Abdouni, Belaïd Sofiane (Braham Chaouch 54’), Chaoui, Bouacida (c) (Boudiaf 73’), Coulibaly, Diakité, Largot, Hadjadj, Daham (Sidibé 83’), Badji, Bouguèche - Coach: Nouzaret Robert

21 November 2005 Second leg	Al-Zawraa (Iraq)	1–3	(Algeria) MC Alger	Amman (Note: Teams from Iraq were not allowed to host their home matches in their country due to security concerns.)
:	Omar Kadhem 80'		Badji 39'; Bouguèche 45'; Chaouch 90'	Stadium: Stade Roi Abdallah II; Referee: (Trio Jordanien) Hassen Merchoud (Jordan); Assistant referees: Mohamed Adel, Samir Ghenam (Jordan)
Note: Lineup for MC Alger - Abdouni, Belaïd, Chaoui, Bouacida (c), Coulibaly, Diakité (Zemit 57'), Largot, Hadjadj, Daham (Badache 64'), Badji (Braham Chaouch 69'), Bouguèche - Coach: Nouzaret Robert

==== Quarter-Finals ====
19 December 2005 First leg	MC Alger (Algeria)	1–3	(Egypt) ENPPI	Algiers
:	Hadjadj 7'		Younis 9'; Zaki 72'; Magdy Abdallah 77'	Stadium: Stade du 5 Juillet; Referee: Abderrahim El Arjoun (Morocco); Assistant referees: Yahia Ghour, Abdallah Belkhtir (Morocco)
Note: Lineup for MC Alger - Abdouni, Largot (Younès 69’), Chaoui, Coulibaly, Boudiaf, Hadjadj, Zemit, Badache (Sidibé 80’), Hamadou (Badji 52'), Daham (c), Bouguèche - Coach: Nouzaret Robert

20 February 2006 Second leg	ENPPI (Egypt)	1–2	(Algeria) MC Alger	Cairo
:	Amr Abdelaâti 28'		Daham 67'; Babouche 90+1'	Stadium: Stade Arab Contractors; Referee: ? (Sudan); Assistant referees: ? (Sudan)
Note: Lineup for MC Alger - Abdouni, Chaoui, Baâbouche, Bouzid, Coulibaly, Zemit, Hamadou, Hadjadj (Badache 8'), Daham (c), Maouche (Sidibé 39' puis Younès 61'), Bouguèche - Coach: Saâdi Nouredine

== Squad information ==
=== Playing statistics ===
No.	Pos	Player	Nat	Division 1			Algerian Cup			Arab Champions League			Total		
No.	Pos	Player	Nat	App	St	G	App	St	G	App	St	G	App	St	G
Goalkeepers
1	GK	Merouane Abdouni	(Algeria)	25	25	0	0	0	0	0	0	0	0	0	0
30	GK	Sofiane Azzedine	(Algeria)	4	4	0	0	0	0	0	0	0	0	0	0
Defenders
12	CB	Moussa Coulibaly	(Mali)	24	24	1	0	0	0	0	0	0	0	0	0
20	CB	Ismaël Bouzid	(Algeria)	22	20	1	0	0	0	0	0	0	0	0	0
5	CB	Smail Chaoui	(Algeria)	22	18	0	0	0	0	0	0	0	0	0	0
4	CB	Kamel Bouacida	(Algeria)	17	17	0	0	0	0	0	0	0	0	0	0
28	DF	Sofiane Belaïd	(Algeria)	17	15	0	0	0	0	0	0	0	0	0	0
	CB	Rafik Boudiaf	(Algeria)	17	9	0	0	0	0	0	0	0	0	0	0
	RB	Hillal Mekesser	(Algeria)	1	1	0	0	0	0	0	0	0	1	1	0
15	LB	Réda Babouche	(Algeria)	24	17	0	0	0	0	0	0	0	0	0	0
Midfielders
10	MF	Fodil Hadjadj	(Algeria)	20	15	0	0	0	0	0	0	0	0	0	0
6	MF	Zoubir Zmit	(Algeria)	28	23	1	0	0	0	0	0	0	0	0	0
21	MF	Kamel Maouche	(Algeria)	11	9	0	0	0	0	0	0	0	0	0	0
23	AM	Yacine Hamadou	(Algeria)	19	16	0	0	0	0	0	0	0	0	0	0
7	AM	Ammar Largot	(Algeria)	20	12	1	0	0	0	0	0	0	0	0	0
	AM	Mohamed Yacine Si Keddour	(Algeria)	3	0	0	0	0	0	0	0	0	0	0	0
8	MF	Faycal Badji	(Algeria)	20	19	3	0	0	0	0	0	0	0	0	0
Forwards
29	FW	Sofiane Younes	(Algeria)	16	9	2	0	0	0	0	0	0	0	0	0
9	FW	Mohamed Badache	(Algeria)	21	14	9	0	0	0	0	0	0	0	0	0
17	FW	Rafan Sidibé	(Senegal)	5	2	0	0	0	0	0	0	0	0	0	0
11	FW	Noureddine Daham	(Algeria)	27	24	14	0	0	0	0	0	0	0	0	0
19	FW	Hadj Bouguèche	(Algeria)	26	23	7	0	0	0	0	0	0	0	0	0
Players transferred out during the season
	GK	Lazreg Benfissa	(Algeria)	1	1	0	0	0	0	0	0	0	1	1	0
14	FW	Karim Braham Chaouch	(Algeria)	10	3	3	0	0	0	0	0	0	10	3	3
22	RB	Drissa Diakité	(Mali)	11	10	0	0	0	0	0	0	0	11	10	0
Total				30		42	6		13	6		11	42		66

Last updated: 11 June 2007

=== Goalscorers ===
Includes all competitive matches.

No.	Nat.	Player	Pos.	D1	AC	C4	TOTAL
11	(Algeria)	Noureddine Daham	FW	13	4	5	22
9	(Algeria)	Mohamed Badache	FW	9	0	0	9
19	(Algeria)	Hadj Bouguèche	FW	7	0	2	9
8	(Algeria)	Faycal Badji	MF	3	2	1	6
14	(Algeria)	Karim Braham Chaouch	FW	3	0	1	4
29	(Algeria)	Sofiane Younes	FW	2	2	0	4
7	(Algeria)	Ammar Largot	MF	1	2	0	3
10	(Algeria)	Fodil Hadjadj	MF	0	0	1	1
15	(Algeria)	Réda Babouche	DF	0	0	1	1
21	(Algeria)	Kamel Maouche	MF	0	1	0	1
17	(Mali)	Rafan Sidibé	FW	0	1	0	1
20	(Algeria)	Ismaël Bouzid	DF	1	0	0	1
12	(Mali)	Moussa Coulibaly	RB	1	0	0	1
6	(Algeria)	Zoubir Zmit	CM	1	0	0	1
Own Goals				1	1	0	1
Totals				42	13	11	66
