= 2008–09 MC Alger season =

MC Alger
2008–09 season
- President: Sadek Amrous
- Head coach: Ameur Djamil (until 12 September 2008); Alain Michel (from 21 September 2008)
- Stadium: Stade 5 Juillet 1962
- National 1: 5th
- Algerian Cup: Round of 32
- Top goalscorer: League: Benie, Bouguèche (6 goals); All: Salim Boumechra (10 goals)
Home colours

In the 2008–09 season, MC Alger competed in the National 1 for the 38th season, as well as the Algerian Cup. It was their 6th consecutive season in the top flight of Algerian football.

== Squad list ==
Players and squad numbers last updated on 6 August 2009.
Note: Flags indicate national team as has been defined under FIFA eligibility rules. Players may hold more than one non-FIFA nationality.

No.	Name	Nat.	Position	Date of Birth (Age)	Signed from
Goalkeepers
1	(Algeria)	Mohamed Benhamou	GK	17 December 1979 (aged 28)	(France) AS Cannes
22	(Algeria)	Azzedine Doukha	GK	5 August 1986 (aged 22)	(Algeria) MO Béjaïa
26	(Algeria)	Mohamed Reda Ouamane	GK	26 June 1983 (aged 25)	(Algeria) MC Oran
Defenders
	(Algeria)	Redouane El-Falaki		30 December 1985 (aged 22)	Unknown
5	(Algeria)	Smail Chaoui	CB	11 February 1982 (aged 26)	(Algeria) ASO Chlef
25	(Algeria)	Hamza Zeddam	CB	8 April 1984 (aged 24)	(Algeria) ES Sétif
	(Algeria)	Brahim Boudebouda	LB	28 August 1990 (aged 17)	(Algeria) Reserve team
15	(Algeria)	Réda Babouche	LB	3 July 1979 (aged 29)	(Algeria) MO Constantine
12	(Mali)	Moussa Coulibaly	RB	19 May 1981 (aged 27)	(Mali) AS Bamako
11	(Algeria)	Abdelkader Besseghir	RB	3 May 1978 (aged 30)	(Algeria) RC Kouba
Midfielders
	(Algeria)	Fodil Hadjadj	DM	18 April 1983 (aged 25)	(France) FC Nantes
	(Togo)	Chérif Touré Mamam		13 January 1978 (aged 30)	(United Arab Emirates) Al Jazira Club
	(Algeria)	Faris Khenniche	DM	12 August 1981 (aged 26)	(France) US Créteil
	(Algeria)	Farid Daoud	DM	25 August 1989 (aged 18)	(Algeria) Reserve team
	(Algeria)	Bilal Moumen	DM	16 February 1990 (aged 18)	(Algeria) Reserve team
13	(Algeria)	Nassim Bouchema	DM	5 May 1988 (aged 20)	(Algeria) Reserve team
21	(Algeria)	Yacine Hammadou		7 September 1980 (aged 27)	(Algeria) USM Annaba
23	(Algeria)	Hamza Koudri	DM	15 December 1987 (aged 20)	(Algeria) Reserve team
17	(Algeria)	Mamaar Bentoucha	RM	1 August 1981 (aged 27)	(Algeria) Unknown
8	(Algeria)	Faycal Badji	AM	15 February 1973 (aged 35)	(Algeria) CR Belouizdad
20	(Algeria)	Salim Boumechra	AM	28 April 1983 (aged 25)	(Algeria) ASM Oran
Forwards
29	(Algeria)	Sofiane Younes	LW	25 November 1982 (aged 25)	(Algeria) USM El Harrach
	(Algeria)	Abdenour Belkheir	RW	21 February 1989 (aged 19)	(Algeria) Reserve team
	(Tunisia)	Chakib Lachkham		27 October 1985 (aged 22)	(Tunisia) EGS Gafsa
	(Algeria)	Mohamed Amroune	ST	10 March 1989 (aged 19)	(Belgium) Mons
	(Algeria)	Safi Belghomari	ST	3 February 1979 (aged 29)	(Algeria) US Biskra
	(Ivory Coast)	Jean-Marc Benie	ST	9 November 1982 (aged 25)	(Libya) Al-Nasr SC
	(Algeria)	Farid Touil	ST	10 December 1974 (aged 33)	(Algeria) ES Sétif
7	(Algeria)	Hamza Yacef	ST	25 August 1979 (aged 28)	(Morocco) Wydad AC
19	(Algeria)	Hadj Bouguèche	ST	7 December 1983 (aged 24)	(Algeria) USM Blida

== Transfers ==
=== In ===
==== Summer ====
Date	Pos	Player	From club	Transfer fee	Source
2 June 2008	MF	(Algeria) Salim Boumechra	ASM Oran	Free transfer	
23 June 2008	DF	(Algeria) Abdelkader Besseghir	RC Kouba	Free transfer	
30 June 2008	FW	(Algeria) Hamza Yacef	(Morocco) Wydad AC	Free transfer	
1 July 2008	MF	(Algeria) Maâmar Bentoucha	MC Saida	Free transfer	
1 July 2008	GK	(Algeria) Azzedine Doukha	MO Béjaïa	Free transfer	
1 July 2008	MF	(Algeria) Yacine Hamadou	USM Annaba	Free transfer	
1 July 2008	DF	(Algeria) Nacer Boulekbache	AS Khroub	Loan	
11 July 2008	FW	(Algeria) Mohamed Boudjenah	Kawkab Oran	Free transfer	
16 July 2008	DF	(Algeria) Hamza Zeddam	ES Sétif	Free transfer	
28 July 2008	FW	(Algeria) Farid Touil	ES Sétif	Free transfer	

==== Winter ====
Date	Pos	Player	From club	Transfer fee	Source
1 January 2009	FW	(Ivory Coast) Jean-Marc Benie	(Libya) Al-Nasr SC	Free transfer	
1 January 2009	FW	(Tunisia) Chakib Lachkham	(Tunisia) EGS Gafsa	loan for six months	
7 January 2009	MF	(Algeria) Faris Khenniche	(France) US Créteil	Free transfer	

=== Out ===
==== Summer ====
Date	Pos	Player	To club	Transfer fee	Source
1 July 2008	DF	(Algeria) Larbi Hosni	USM Alger	Free transfer	
1 July 2008	DF	(Algeria) Samir Galloul	NA Hussein Dey	Free transfer	
1 July 2008	MF	(Algeria) Farouk Belkaïd	ES Sétif	Free transfer	
1 July 2008	FW	(Algeria) Abdelmalek Cherrad	(France) SC Bastia	Free transfer	
1 July 2008	FW	(Mali) Rafan Sidibé	MSP Batna	Free transfer	
1 July 2008	GK	(Algeria) Sofiane Azzedine	Unattached	Free transfer	
1 July 2008	FW	(Algeria) Sofiane Mezraoui	CR Belouizdad	Free transfer	
1 July 2008	CB	(Algeria) Noureddine Kaddour	RC Kouba	Free transfer	

==== Winter ====
Date	Pos	Player	To club	Transfer fee	Source
1 January 2009	CB	(Algeria) Sofiane Belaïd	Unattached	Free transfer	
1 January 2009	FW	(Algeria) Farid Touil	CS Constantine	Free transfer	
1 January 2009	FW	(Algeria) Nacer Boulekbache	RC Kouba	Free transfer	
1 January 2009	FW	(Algeria) Safi Belghomari	MC Oran	Free transfer	
1 January 2009	FW	(Algeria) Mohamed Boudjenah	MC Oran	Free transfer	
1 January 2009	MF	(Togo) Chérif Touré Mamam	Unattached	Free transfer	
1 January 2009	DF	(Algeria) Imad Bella	ESM Koléa	Free transfer	

== Pre-season and friendlies ==
25 July 2008 Friendly	En Avant Guingamp (France)	1–1	(Algeria) MC Alger	Plouagat
18:00	Eduardo 60'		Babouche 27'	Stadium: Stade Claude Michel
Note: Lineup for MC Alger - Ouamane, Besseghier, Baâbouche (c), Coulibaly (Bella), Chaoui, Koudri, Younès, Hadjadj, Yacef Hamza, Belghomari (Hamadou, 58'), Bouguèche (Badji, 78')

29 July 2008 Friendly	Vannes OC (France)	2–2	(Algeria) MC Alger	Mûr-de-Bretagne
	Lebouc 8'; Diguiny 25'		Yacef 29'; Younes 86'
Note: Lineup for MC Alger - Doukha, Besseghier (Belaid Sofiane, 88'), Baâbouche (c), Chaoui (Moumen, 46'), Coulibaly (Zeddam, 36'), Hamadou (Boulekbache, 83'), Hadjadj (Koudri 70'), Badji (Belghomari, 60'), Bouguèche, Yacef Hamza (Boudjenah, 80'), Younès

5 October 2008 Friendly	NARB Réghaïa	1–4	MC Alger	Reghaïa
	? 80' (pen.)		Yacef 10'; Boulekbache 55'; Amroune 65'; Boumechra 89'	Stadium: Stade Communal

12 October 2008 Friendly	WA Rouiba	1–0	MC Alger	Rouiba
	? 35'			Stadium: Stade Communal
Note: Lineup for MC Alger - Doukha, Bouchema (Besseghier, 46'), Belaid Sofiane (Daoud Farid, 46'), Bella (Coulibaly, 46'), Zeddam (Chaoui, 46'), Moumen (Bentoucha, 46' puis Boumechra, 60'), Hamadou (Bouguèche, 46'), Hadjadj (Badji, 46'), Boudjenah (Yacef, 46'), Boulekbache (Belghomari, 46'), Amroune (Younès, 46')

8 January 2009 Friendly	CS Sfaxien (Tunisia)	3–2	(Algeria) MC Alger	Sfax
	Jabeur 16', 40'; Merdassi 90+1' (pen.)		Yacef 22'; Boumechra 63'	Stadium: Taieb Mhiri Stadium; Referee: Yacine El Harrouss, Hakim Ibrahim, Karam Ezzaghel
Note: Lineup for MC Alger - Benhamou (Doukha, 46'), Besseghier, Baâbouche, Alassane Ismaila Eragae (Zeddam, 46'), Coulibaly (Chaoui, 46'), Bentoucha, Hadjadj (Daoud Farid, 62'), Badji (c) (Belkheir, 46'), Salami Azziez (Belghomari, 38'), Lachkham (Younès, 65'), Yacef (Boumechra, 50')

10 January .2009 Friendly	Moustakbal El Mahdia (Tunisia)	0–2	(Algeria) MC Alger	Mahdia
			Babouche ?; Younes ?	Stadium: Stade Municipal

== Competitions ==
=== Overview ===
Competition	Record								Started round	Final position / round	First match	Last match
Competition	G	W	D	L	GF	GA	GD	Win %	Started round	Final position / round	First match	Last match
Division 1	32	13	10	9	40	38	+2	40.63	—N/a	5th	7 August 2008	28 May 2009
Algerian Cup	2	1	1	0	9	0	+9	50.00	Round of 64	Round of 32	15 January 2009	22 January 2009
Total	34	14	11	9	49	38	+11	41.18				

=== Division 1 ===
==== League table ====
Pos	Team	Pld	W	D	L	GF	GA	GD	Pts	Qualification or relegation
3	JSM Béjaïa	32	15	8	9	33	20	+13	53	
4	CR Belouizdad (Q)	32	15	5	12	33	27	+6	50	2010 CAF Confederation Cup
5	MC Alger	32	13	10	9	40	38	+2	49	
6	USM Alger	32	13	9	10	38	31	+7	48	
7	CA Bordj Bou Arréridj	32	14	7	11	34	33	+1	48 (Note: CA Bordj Bou Arréridj were docked one point)	

Source: DZFoot 1er Division 2008-2009
Rules for classification: 1) points; 2) goal difference; 3) number of goals scored.
(Q) Qualified for the phase indicated

==== Results summary ====
Overall								Home						Away					
Pld	W	D	L	GF	GA	GD	Pts	W	D	L	GF	GA	GD	W	D	L	GF	GA	GD
32	13	10	9	40	38	+2	49	9	6	1	25	14	+11	4	4	8	15	24	−9

Last updated: 28 May 2009.
Source: Competitive matches

==== Results by round ====
Round	1	2	3	4	5	6	7	8	9	10	11	12	13	14	15	16	17	18	19	20	21	22	23	24	25	26	27	28	29	30	31	32
Ground	A	A	H	A	H	A	H	A	H	A	H	A	H	H	A	H	H															
Result	D	L	W	L	D	L	D	L	W	W	L	L	W	W	D	W	W															
Position	7	6	1	6	6	10	8	8	12	10	8	11	13	10	14	9	10	6	3	5	6	6	5	6	5	6	7	6	5	5	6	5

Source: Competitive matches
A = Away; H = Home; W = Win; D = Draw; L = Loss

==== Matches ====
7 August 2008 Round 1	USM El Harrach	2–2	MC Alger	Rouïba
17:00	Saïbi 30', 45'		Belghomari 40'; Bouguèche 51'	Stadium: Salem Mabrouki Stadium; Referee: Djaballah, Omari, Etchiali
Note: Lineup for MC Alger - Ouamane, Besseghier, Baâbouche (c), Chaoui, Zeddam, Koudri, Younès, Hadjadj (Hamadou 62’), Belghomari (Badji 83’), Bouguèche, Yacef - Coach: Ameur Djamil

14 August 2008 Round 2	ASO Chlef	2–1	MC Alger	Chlef
17:00	Soudani 49'; Messaoud 77' (pen.)		Babouche 73' (pen.)	Stadium: Mohamed Boumezrag Stadium
Note: Lineup for MC Alger - Benhamou, Besseghier, Baâbouche (c), Coulibaly, Zeddam, Koudri (Belkheir 84’), Hadjadj, Bouguèche, Yacef, Younès, Belghomari (Badji 61’) - Coach: Ameur Djamil

25 August 2008 Round 3	MC Alger	3–0	MC El Eulma	Bologhine
	Belghomari 57', 88'; Bouguèche 72'			Stadium: Omar Hamadi Stadium; Referee: Haimoudi, Bouhassoun, Bouanani
Note: Lineup for MC Alger - Benhamou, Besseghier, Baâbouche (c), Chaoui, Coulibaly, Hadjadj, Koudri, Hamadou (Badji 50'), Bouguèche (Boudjenah 75'), Belghomari, Yacef - Coach: Ameur Djamil

29 August 2008 Round 4	NA Hussein Dey	4–2	MC Alger	Algiers
	Attafen 1'; Nehari 16'; Derrardja 49'; Hafid Rabah 72'		Bouguèche 4'; Babouche 34'	Stadium: Stade 20 Août 1955; Referee: Fetouha, Benchouia, Touil
Note: Lineup for MC Alger - Benhamou, Besseghier, Baâbouche (c), Chaoui, Coulibaly (Zeddam 25'), Hadjadj, Koudri, Hamadou (Touré Chérif 33'), Bouguèche (Bentoucha 59'), Belghomari, Yacef - Coach: Ameur Djamil

11 September 2008 Round 5	MC Alger	3–3	AS Khroub	Bologhine
	Younes 20', 90'; Belghomari 53'		Bourahli 3'; Liadé 26'; Z.Ngonou 68'	Stadium: Omar Hamadi Stadium; Referee: Boukedjar, Talbi, Megrah
Note: Lineup for MC Alger - Benhamou, Besseghier, Baâbouche (c), Zeddam, Coulibaly, Bentoucha, Touré Chérif (Hamadou 58'), Badji (Yacef 70'), Bouguèche (Touil 70'), Belghomari, Younès - Coach: Ameur Djamil

18 September 2008 Round 6	JSM Béjaïa	3–0	MC Alger	Béjaïa
	Boukessassa 82'; Boulemdaïs 85'; Belkheir Mohamed Lamine 90'			Stadium: Stade de l'Unité Maghrébine; Referee: Boumaâ6za, Feddaoui, Saâdi
Note: Lineup for MC Alger - Doukha, Besseghier, Zeddam, Chaoui (c), Boudebouda, Boumechra (Hamadou 61'), Bentoucha, Touré Chérif, Younès, Belghomari (Yacef 81’), Bouguèche - Coach: Abdelmadjid Oudina

1 December 2008 (Note: The match was originally to be played on 25 September 2008, but it was postponed due to stadium unavailable, after the refusal of local authorities to play the match at Stade 20 Août 1955 then postponed to 20 November 2008 before being postponed again because of USM Alger's trip to Saudi Arabia. LNF decided to schedule it for 1 December 2008 at Stade 20 Août 1955.) Round 7	MC Alger	0–0	USM Alger	Algiers
				Stadium: Stade 20 Août 1955; Referee: Haïmoudi, Belkheir, Bouhassoun
Note: Lineup for MC Alger - Benhamou, Besseghier, Baâbouche (c), Zeddam, Chaoui, Koudri, Hadjadj, Touré Chérif (Touil 87’), Badji (Hamadou 71'), Boumechra, Amroune (Bouguèche 59’) - Coach: Michel Alain

16 October 2008 Round 8	CA Bordj Bou Arréridj	2–0	MC Alger	Bordj Bou Arréridj
	Bentayeb 10' (pen.); Hachoud 36'			Stadium: Stade 20 Août 1955; Referee: Haimoudi, Belkheir, Bouanani
Note: Lineup for MC Alger - Benhamou, Besseghier, Baâbouche (c), Coulibaly, Chaoui, Boumechra, Bentoucha, Badji (Hamadou 66’), Younès, Belghomari (Touil 80’), Bouguèche (Yacef 65’) - Coach: Michel Alain

23 October 2008 Round 9	MC Alger	1–0	USM Annaba	Bologhine
	Touil 8'			Stadium: Omar Hamadi Stadium; Referee: Belkacem, Deffar, Archaoui
Note: Lineup for MC Alger - Benhamou, Besseghier, Baâbouche (c) (Zeddam 63’), Coulibaly, Chaoui, Hadjadj, Touré Chérif, Badji (Boumechra 76’), Younès, Belghomari (Bouguèche 58’), Touil - Coach: Michel Alain

1 November 2008 Round 10	CR Belouizdad	1–2	MC Alger	Algiers
	Berguiga 78'		Coulibaly 37'; Chérif Touré 52'	Stadium: Stade 20 Août 1955; Referee: Benouza, Meknous, Ouaddah
Note: Lineup for MC Alger - Benhamou, Besseghier, Baâbouche (c), Coulibaly, Chaoui, Koudri, Hadjadj, Touré Chérif (Bouguèche 75'), Badji (Bentoucha 55’), Younès, Belghomari (Boudebouda 85') - Coach: Michel Alain

10 November 2008 Round 11	MC Alger	1–2	MSP Batna	Bologhine
	Younes 10'		Chaouch 6'; Ali Bendebka 51'	Stadium: Omar Hamadi Stadium; Referee: Mehidi, Bechirane, Benaboune
Note: Lineup for MC Alger - Benhamou, Besseghier, Baâbouche (c), Coulibaly, Chaoui, Bentoucha (Bouguèche 61’), Hadjadj, Touré Chérif, Badji (Belkheir 80’), Younès, Yacef (Touil 37’) - Coach: Michel Alain

14 November 2008 Round 12	ES Sétif	1–0	MC Alger	Sétif
	Ziaya 38'			Stadium: 8 May 1945 Stadium; Referee: Djaballah, Etchiali, Bechirène
Note: Lineup for MC Alger - Benhamou, Bentoucha, Baâbouche (c), Coulibaly, Zeddam, Boudebouda, Koudri, Hamadou (Touil 80’), Touré Chérif (Boumechra 71’), Younès, Belghomari (Belkheir 64’) - Coach: Michel Alain

17 November 2008 Round 2	MC Alger	1–0	RC Kouba (Note: After winning the case in the Court of Arbitration for Sport, the Algerian Football Federation on October 26, 2008, added RC Kouba to the Division 1, bringing it to 17 clubs.)	Bologhine
	Badji 67'			Stadium: Omar Hamadi Stadium; Attendance: 0 (close doors); Referee: Benaïssa, Bourouis, Chenaoua
Note: Lineup for MC Alger - Doukha, Bentoucha, Baâbouche (c), Zeddam, Coulibaly (Chaoui 46'), Koudri, Touré Chérif, Badji, Hadjadj, Touil (Belghomari 64'), Bouguèche - Coach: Michel Alain

27 November 2008 Round 13	MC Alger	2–1	JS Kabylie	Bologhine
	Amroune 67'; Boumechra 72'		Ouznadji 43'	Stadium: Omar Hamadi Stadium; Referee: Abed, Gueroudj, Hedia
Note: Lineup for MC Alger - Benhamou, Besseghier, Baâbouche (c), Coulibaly Moussa (Chaoui 69’), Zeddam, Badji, Koudri, Hadjadj, Touré Chérif, Amroune (Bentoucha 80’), Belghomari (Boumechra 57’) - Coach: Michel Alain

5 December 2008 Round 14	USM Blida	0–0	MC Alger	Mouzaïa
				Stadium: Stade Chahid Rebbouh; Attendance: 0 (close doors); Referee: Houasnia, Boulegrinet, Badache
Note: Lineup for MC Alger - Benhamou, Besseghier, Baâbouche (c), Zeddam, Chaoui, Bentoucha, Hamadou (Boudebouda 42’), Badji (Belkheir 79’), Touré Chérif, Bouguèche (Amroune 58’), Boumechra - Coach: Michel Alain

18 December 2008 Round 15	MC Alger	2–1	MC Saïda	Bologhine
	Boumechra 20'; Coulibaly 90+2'		Foussini 30'	Stadium: Omar Hamadi Stadium; Referee: Ouchen, Rebaï, Belouar
Note: Lineup for MC Alger - Benhamou, Besseghier, Boudebouda, Zeddam, Coulibaly, Koudri (Belghomari 70’), Yacef (Amroune 84’), Bentoucha, Boumechra, Badji (c), Belkheir - Coach: Michel Alain

19 February 2009 Round 18	RC Kouba	0–2	MC Alger	Kouba
			Benie 31'; Yacef 71'	Stadium: Mohamed Benhaddad Stadium; Referee: Benaissa, Chnaoua, Benouis
Note: Lineup for MC Alger - Benhamou, Benseghier, Baâbouche (c), Zeddam, Coulibaly, Bentoucha (Daoud Farid 62'), Yacef, Koudri, Benié (Boudebouda 87'), Badji (Belkheir 75'), Younès - Coach: Michel Alain

26 February 2009 Round 19	MC El Eulma	2–1	MC Alger	El Eulma
	Gasmi 43'; Gerard Mongolo 55'		Babouche 40'	Stadium: Stade Messaoud Zougar; Referee: Khelifi, Chaâbane, Seghiri
Note: Lineup for MC Alger - Benhamou, Besseghier, Baâbouche (c), Zeddam, Coulibaly, Boudebouda, Daoud Farid, Koudri (Boumechra, 65’), Benié, Younès, Bouguèche (Belkheir, 76’) - Coach: Michel Alain

2 March 2009 Round 20	MC Alger	2–2	NA Hussein Dey	Bologhine
	Benie 42', 44'		Hafid 17'; Jimmy 26'	Stadium: Omar Hamadi Stadium; Referee: Haïmoudi, Etchiali, Keraï
Note: Lineup for MC Alger - Benhamou, Besseghier, Baâbouche (c), Chaoui, Zeddam, Daoud Farid (Bentoucha, 75’), Hadjadj, Badji (Lachkham, 67’), Yacef (Bouguèche, 79’), Benié, Younès - Coach: Michel Alain

5 March 2009 Round 21	AS Khroub	0–0	MC Alger	El Khroub
				Stadium: Abed Hamdani Stadium; Attendance: 0 (close doors); Referee: Abid Charef, Bougherara, Zellagui
Note: Lineup for MC Alger - Benhamou, Bentoucha, Boudebouda, Chaoui, Zeddam, Koudri, Younès, Hadjadj (Daoud Farid 46’), Benié (Belkheir 80’), Lachkham (Boumechra, 56’), Baâbouche (c) - Coach: Michel Alain

9 March 2009 Round 17	MC Alger	2–0	USM El Harrach	Bologhine
	Benie 19'; Younes 38'			Stadium: Omar Hamadi Stadium; Attendance: 0 (close doors); Referee: Houasnia, Talbi, Korichi
Note: Lineup for MC Alger - Benhamou, Besseghier, Baâbouche (c), Zeddam, Coulibaly, Daoud Farid, Badji (Koudri 63’), Younès, Yacef (Bouguèche 76’), Benié (Boumechra 86’), Hadjadj - Coach: Michel Alain

19 March 2009 Round 23	USM Alger	3–0	MC Alger	Bologhine
	Dziri 49'; Hamidi 57', 65'			Stadium: Omar Hamadi Stadium; Attendance: 0 (close doors); Referee: Haddada, Belagoune, Azrine
Note: Lineup for MC Alger - Benhamou, Bentoucha (Besseghier, 70’), Bâabouche (c), Zeddam, Coulibaly, Koudri, Yacef, Daoud Farid, Benié, Badji (Lachkham, 70’), Younès - Coach: Michel Alain

26 March 2009 Round 22	MC Alger	1–0	JSM Béjaïa	Bologhine
	Bouguèche 45+2'			Stadium: Omar Hamadi Stadium; Referee: Ferradi, Djahnine, Chaoui
Note: Lineup for MC Alger - Ouamane, Besseghier, Boudebouda, Zeddam, Coulibaly, Koudri, Daoud Farid (Bouchema, 88’), Hadjadj (c), Benié, Boumechra (Younès, 60’), Bouguèche (Belkheir 80’) - Coach: Michel Alain

23 March 2009 Round 18	MC Alger	2–2	ASO Chlef	Bologhine
	Bouguèche 24', 40'		Gouaïche 51', 75'	Stadium: Omar Hamadi Stadium; Attendance: 0 (close doors); Referee: Benbaka, Saâdi, Benmouloud
Note: Lineup for MC Alger - Doukha, Besseghir, Chaoui (Bouchema 65’), Zeddam, Coulibaly, Hadjadj (c), Koudri, Lachkham (Hamadou 72’), Younès (Belkheir 78’), Bouguèche, Benié - Coach: Michel Alain

30.3.2009 Round 24	MC Alger	1–0	CA Bordj Bou Arréridj	Bologhine
	Benie 16'			Stadium: Omar Hamadi Stadium; Referee: Bouhenni, Kerraï, Bechirène
Note: Lineup for MC Alger - Ouamane, Besseghier, Boudebouda, Baâbouche (c) (Lachkham 73’), Coulibaly, Zeddam, Daoud Farid, Hadjadj, Boumechra, Bouguèche (Bouchema 89’), Benié (Younès 56’) - Coach: Michel Alain

2 April 2009 Round 25	USM Annaba	3–1	MC Alger	Annaba
	El Hadi 46', 75'; Fadiga 70'		Amroune 72'	Stadium: Stade 19 Mai 1956; Referee: Haimoudi, Kerai, Bouhassoune
Note: Lineup for MC Alger - Ouamane, Besseghier, Boudebouda, Coulibaly, Chaoui, Koudri, Bouguèche (Belkheir 68'), Baâbouche (c), Benié (Amroune 71'), Boumechra (Younès 51') - Coach: Michel Alain

13 April 2009 Round 26	MC Alger	1–1	CR Belouizdad	Bologhine
	Boumechra 26'		Fenier 7'	Stadium: Omar Hamadi Stadium; Referee: Amalou, Talbi, Ibelaïdène
Note: Lineup for MC Alger - Benhamou, Besseghier, Boudebouda, Coulibaly, Zeddam, Koudri, Daoud Farid (Amroune 76’), Baâbouche (c), Boumechra (Kheniche 83’), Bouguèche (Lachkham 83’), Benié - Coach: Michel Alain

16 April 2009 Round 27	MSP Batna	0–1	MC Alger	Batna
			Boumechra 39'	Stadium: Stade 1er Novembre 1954; Referee: Djerbouaâ, Djaâfar, Amghar
Note: Lineup for MC Alger - Benhamou (c), Besseghier, Boudebouda, Zeddam, Coulibaly, Bouchema, Koudri (Bentoucha 81’), Daoud Farid, Amroune (Belkheir 76’), Boumechra (Lachkham 85’), Bouguèche - Coach: Michel Alain

7 May 2009 Round 29	JS Kabylie	1–1	MC Alger	Tizi Ouzou
	Bensaïd 36'		Amroune 71'	Stadium: Stade 1er Novembre 1954; Referee: Houasnia, Badache, Boulikrinet
Note: Lineup for MC Alger - Benhamou, Besseghier, Boudebouda, Baâbouche (c), Coulibaly, Zeddam, Koudri, Bouchema, Boumechra (Younès 55’), Bouguèche (Daoud Farid 85’), Benié (Amroune 71’) - Coach: Michel Alain

14 May 2009 Round 30	MC Alger	1–1	USM Blida	Bologhine
	Amroune 70'		Hamiti 7'	Stadium: Omar Hamadi Stadium; Referee: Bennouza, Meknous, Belfekrou
Note: Lineup for MC Alger - Benhamou, Besseghier, Baâbouche (c), Boudebouda, Zeddam, Bouchema, Belkheir (Amroune 46’), Daoud Farid (Koudri 57’), Benié, Boumechra, Bouguèche - Coach: Michel Alain

28 May 2009 Round 31	MC Saida	0–2	MC Alger	Saïda
			Lachkham 24'; Benie 33'	Stadium: Stade 13 Avril 1958; Referee: Babou, Atou, Bouzaghou
Note: Lineup for MC Alger - Ouamane, Bentoucha, Boudebouda, Chaoui (c), Zeddam, Koudri, Boumechra (Badji 76’), Bouchema, Benié, Lachkham (Daoud Farid 67’), Amroune (Belkheir 58’) - Coach: Michel Alain

4 June 2009 (Note: The match was originally to be played on 30 April 2009, but it was postponed.) Round 28	MC Alger	2–1	ES Sétif	Bologhine
	Boumechra 50' (pen.), 53'		Hemani 60'	Stadium: Omar Hamadi Stadium; Referee: Aouina Said, Aouina F, Benghanem
Note: Lineup for MC Alger - Ouamane, Besseghier, Boudebouda, Chaoui (c), Zeddam, Koudri, Daoud Farid (Amroune 46’), Bouchema, Benié (Bentoucha 81’), Boumechra (Belkheir 87’), Bouguèche - Coach: Michel Alain

=== Algerian Cup ===
15 January 2009 Round of 64	MC Alger	9–0	IRB Ain D’heb	Oued Rhiou
:	Bentriba 24' (o.g.); Belkheir 25', 42'; Boumechra 39', 46', 65', 76', 80'; Babouche 70'			Stadium: Stade du Maghreb Arabe; Referee: Bennrahim, Belkheir, Graïdi
Note: Lineup for MC Alger - Benhamou, Besseghier (Bouchema, 71’), Bâabouche, Chaoui, Coulibaly, Bentoucha, Belkheir, Hadjadj, Bouguèche (Younès, 53’), Boumechra, Badji (c) (Daoud Farid, 61’)

22 January 2009 Round of 32	CR Belouizdad	0–0 (a.e.t.) (4–1 p)	MC Alger	Tizi Ouzou
:				Stadium: Stade 1er Novembre 1954; Referee: Haïmoudi, Omari, Belkheïr
Note: Lineup for MC Alger - Benhamou, Besseghier, Baâbouche, Zeddam, Coulibaly, Bentoucha (Daoud Farid, 46'), Belkheir, Hadjadj (Chaoui, 85'), Bouguèche, Boumechra, Badji (c) (Younès, 90'+1)

== Squad information ==
=== Playing statistics ===
No.	Pos	Player	Nat	Division 1			Algerian Cup			Total		
No.	Pos	Player	Nat	App	St	G	App	St	G	App	St	G
Goalkeepers
1	GK	Mohamed Benhamou	(Algeria)	23	23	0	2	2	0	25	25	0
22	GK	Azzedine Doukha	(Algeria)	3	3	0	0	0	0	3	3	0
26	GK	Mohamed Reda Ouamane	(Algeria)	6	6	0	0	0	0	6	6	0
Defenders
		Redouane El-Falaki	(Algeria)	0	0	0	0	0	0	0	0	0
5	CB	Smail Chaoui	(Algeria)	18	16	0	2	1	0	20	17	0
25	CB	Hamza Zeddam	(Algeria)	28	26	0	1	1	0	29	27	0
	LB	Brahim Boudebouda	(Algeria)	17	14	0	0	0	0	17	14	0
15	LB	Réda Babouche	(Algeria)	25	25	3	2	2	1	27	27	4
12	RB	Moussa Coulibaly	(Mali)	22	22	2	2	2	0	24	24	2
11	RB	Abdelkader Besseghir	(Algeria)	28	27	0	2	2	0	30	29	0
17	DF	Mamaar Bentoucha	(Algeria)	18	12	0	2	2	0	20	14	0
Midfielders
	DM	Fodil Hadjadj	(Algeria)	16	16	0	2	2	0	18	18	0
	MF	Chérif Touré Mamam	(Togo)	11	10	1	0	0	0	11	10	1
	DM	Faris Khenniche	(Algeria)	1	0	0	0	0	0	1	0	0
	DM	Farid Daoud	(Algeria)	15	11	0	2	0	0	17	11	0
	DM	Bilal Moumen	(Algeria)	0	0	0	0	0	0	0	0	0
13	DM	Nassim Bouchema	(Algeria)	8	5	1	1	0	0	9	5	1
21	MF	Yacine Hammadou	(Algeria)	10	4	0	0	0	0	10	4	0
23	DM	Hamza Koudri	(Algeria)	24	22	0	0	0	0	24	22	0
8	AM	Faycal Badji	(Algeria)	18	14	1	2	2	0	20	16	1
20	AM	Salim Boumechra	(Algeria)	20	14	5	2	2	5	22	16	10
Forwards
29	LW	Sofiane Younes	(Algeria)	20	16	4	2	0	0	22	16	4
	RW	Abdenour Belkheir	(Algeria)	15	2	0	2	2	2	17	4	0
		Chakib Lachkham	(Tunisia)	8	3	1	0	0	0	8	3	1
	ST	Mohamed Amroune	(Algeria)	11	4	4	0	0	0	11	4	4
	ST	Safi Belghomari	(Algeria)	13	11	4	0	0	0	13	11	4
	ST	Jean-Marc Benie	(Ivory Coast)	15	15	6	0	0	0	15	15	6
	ST	Farid Touil	(Algeria)	7	2	1	0	0	0	7	2	1
7	ST	Hamza Yacef	(Algeria)	13	10	1	0	0	0	13	10	1
19	ST	Hadj Bouguèche	(Algeria)	26	19	6	2	2	0	28	21	6
Total				32		40	2		9	34		49

Last updated: 23 May 2024

=== Goalscorers ===
Includes all competitive matches.

No.	Nat.	Player	Pos.	L1	AC	TOTAL
20	(Algeria)	Salim Boumechra	MF	5	5	10
19	(Algeria)	Hadj Bouguèche	FW	6	0	6
	(Ivory Coast)	Jean-Marc Benie	FW	6	0	6
	(Algeria)	Safi Belghomari	FW	4	0	4
	(Algeria)	Mohamed Amroune	FW	4	0	4
29	(Algeria)	Sofiane Younes	FW	4	0	4
15	(Algeria)	Réda Babouche	DF	3	1	4
	(Algeria)	Abdenour Belkheir	FW	0	2	2
12	(Mali)	Moussa Coulibaly	DF	2	0	2
	(Algeria)	Farid Touil	FW	1	0	1
	(Togo)	Chérif Touré Mamam	MF	1	0	1
8	(Algeria)	Faycal Badji	MF	1	0	1
	(Tunisia)	Chakib Lachkham	FW	1	0	1
7	(Algeria)	Hamza Yacef	ST	1	0	1
13	(Algeria)	Nassim Bouchema	DM	0	0	0
Own Goals				0	1	1
Totals				40	9	49
