= List of Algerian Ligue Professionnelle 1 highest scoring games =

This is a summary of the highest scoring games and biggest winning margins in the Algerian Ligue Professionnelle 1 since its establishment in the 1998–1999 season.

== Highest scoring ==
Goals scored	Date	Home team	Result	Away team	Goal scorers	Ref
10	12 May 2003	USM Alger	8 – 2	MC Oran	Ouichaoui 4', 20', 45', Djahnine 30', Achiou 40', Ammour 51', Dziri 54', Benchergui 88'; Berradja 39', Bermati 49'	
9	21 August 2021	CS Constantine	5 – 4	CA Bordj Bou Arreridj	Bendaoud 21', Dib 44', Lakdja 46', Bouldjedri 70', 89'; Amriche 17', Belferkous 62' (pen.), Guessas 66', Lalaoui 90+3'	
9	27 July 2021	Paradou AC	5 – 4	MC Oran	Bouguerra 9', Zerrouki 47', 55', 68', Boucif 88'; Nekkache 72', 87', Naâmani 84', Khettab 90+4'	
9	1 July 2002	WA Tlemcen	8 – 1	CA Bordj Bou Arreridj	Bouchlaghem 6', 24', 45', Hachemi 21', 65' (pen.), Merrakchi 42', Dahleb 48', 49'; Rihi 82'	
9	11 June 2007	Paradou AC	6 – 3	CA Batna	Ouali 10', 58', Bouaïcha 21', 28', 57', 80' (pen.); Meziani 39', Hamdaoui 65', 77'	
9	13 June 2005	WA Tlemcen	8 – 1	MC Alger	Dahleb 44', Dif 45', 61', 88', Ouahid 50' (o.g.), Boulaïnceur 70', Benmoussa 86', Olawale 90'; Sidibé 83'	
9	28 December 1998	CR Belouizdad	7 – 2	SA Mohammadia	Talis 19', Boutaleb 34' (pen.), 61', Selmi 45', Ali Moussa 55', 59', Hechaichi 78'; Arbi 5', Ammour 30'	
8	26 October 2000	USM Blida	7 – 1	WA Tlemcen	Zouani 2', Kherkhache 60', 74', 86', Bakir 43', Khedraoui 45' (o.g.), Piracaïa 79'; Betouaf 68'	
8	22 May 2021	ES Sétif	8 – 0	USM Bel Abbès	Djahnit 11' (pen.), Amoura 21', 33', Kendouci 23', Laouafi 63', Berbache 82', Ghacha 90+1', Saâdi 90+4' -	
8	17 May 2010	CR Belouizdad	7 – 1	JS Kabylie	Abdat 2', Slimani 20', 24', 48', 69', Rebih 37' (pen.), Saïbi 90+1' (pen.); Tedjar 32' (pen.)	
8	14 December 2001	USM Alger	5 – 3	ASM Oran	Bourahli 5', Djahnine 40', Benchergui 66', 71', Hadj Adlane 88'; Belatoui 48' (pen.), Nessakh, 57', Benayada 90+2'	
8	20 May 1999	ES Mostaganem	5 – 3	IRB Hadjout	Mokadem 9' Amrane 25', 35', 76' Djender 36'; Hayel 19', Karfeh 20', 77'	
8	29 February 2008	WA Tlemcen	6 – 2	CA Bordj Bou Arreridj	Deghiche 12', Kherris 14', 57', Benmoussa 76', 85', 90'; Haddad 67', Boudjelid 82'	
8	24 November 2005	MC Oran	2 – 6	Paradou AC	Hamdi 37', Boussaïd 68'; Maïdi 21', Djediat 30', 73', Athmani 75', Boubrit 81', Touati 85’	
8	20 September 2004	ES Sétif	5 – 3	GC Mascara	Fellahi 3', 30', Achouri 49', Mekhalfi 67', Laâmèche 74'; Bouras 10', 76', Abaci 45'	
8	7 June 2017	USM Alger	6 – 2	USM Bel-Abbès	Darfalou 9', Meftah 29', Meziane 45+1', Bourenane 58', Koudri 65', Beldjilali 77'; Zouari 22', Bounoua 90+2' (pen.)	
7	17 April 2001	USM Alger	2 – 5	USM Annaba	Hadj Adlane 8', 31'; Tourchi 2', Djabelkheir 48', 53', 89', El Hadi 78'	
7	24 December 1998	JS Kabylie	7 – 0	JSM Tébessa	Aït Tahar 5', 14', 30', 40', Ghazi 8', 15', 55' -	
7	3 December 2010	JSM Béjaïa	5 – 2	MC El Eulma	Gasmi 1', 11', Zerdab 23', N'Djeng 31' (pen.), Megateli 37', Benhadj Djillali 48', Benamokrane 82',	
7	15 April 2011	MC Saïda	5 – 2	WA Tlemcen	Cheraïtia 4', 40', Madouni 7', 48', 75', Boudjakdji 78' (pen.), Mebarki 81',	
7	8 May 2012	USM Alger	3 – 4	JSM Béjaïa	Daham 31' (pen.), 42' (pen.), 64' (pen.), Derrag 10', Bachiri 20', Gasmi 45', Megateli 86',	
7	12 February 2012	MC Saïda	6 – 1	AS Khroub	Sayah 16', Madouni 31', 53', 73', Ould Teguedi 84', Zaoui 90+3'; Belaïli 58'	
7	18 September 2012	CS Constantine	4 – 3	MC Oran	Benhadj Djillali 5', Boulemdaïs 31', 72', Bezzaz 38'; Korbiaa 21', Chérif 43', Aouad 81'	
7	10 May 2014	ES Sétif	4 – 3	CA Bordj Bou Arreridj	Gourmi 55' (pen.), Ogbi Benhadouche 70', Nadji 73', Lamri 85'; Bouflih 6', Mansour 21', Djerrar 52'	
7	24 August 2013	MC El Eulma	3 – 4	JS Kabylie	Chenihi 17', Remache 70' (o.g.), Hamiti 75'; Yesli 30', 84', Rial 58', Ebossé 65'	
7	3 May 2014	USM Alger	5 – 2	MC Oran	Nsombo 7', Meftah 31' (pen.), Ferhat 40', 63', Seguer 44'; Berradja 19', 90+1'	
7	25 April 2014	RC Arbaâ	4 – 3	JS Kabylie	Amiri 4', Mokdad 16', Bougueroua 24', Lazaref 72'; Ebossé 60', 90+1', Mekkaoui 66'	
7	6 March 2015	ES Sétif	5 – 2	ASM Oran	Sofiane 27', 60', 67', Dahar 87', Korbiaa 90+3'; Aouad 24', Benkablia 82'	
7	24 April 2010	USM El Harrach	5 – 2	MC Oran	Boualem 4', Bourakba 25', 50', Hendou 41', Djabou 78'; Chaïb 17', Berramla 82' (pen.)	
7	28 May 2009	USM Blida	3 – 4	ASO Chlef	Herbache 35', 52', Selama 59' (o.g.); Messaoud 9', 37', 52', Daoud 89'	
7	30 March 2009	MC Saïda	2 – 5	ES Sétif	Dampha 59', Seddik 71'; Delhoum 18', 80', Djediat 24', Feham 39', Adiko 56'	
7	25 August 2008	ES Sétif	5 – 2	USM Annaba	Djediat 3', Diss 45', Ziaya 60', 67', Seguer 85'; Athmani 66' (pen.), Hamidi 77'	
7	29 October 2007	JS Kabylie	6 – 1	WA Tlemcen	Athmani 1' (pen.), 25', 42', Meftah 22', Bensaïd 66', 79'; Yalaoui 88' (pen.)	
7	18 November 2004	JS Kabylie	6 – 1	MC Alger	Belkaid 16', Edzenga 40', Berguiga 45', 73' (pen.), Zafour 54', Belhadj 86'; Chaouch 51'	
7	19 September 2002	JS Kabylie	6 – 1	ASM Oran	Bendahmane 8', 25', M.Dob 63', 86', Amaouche 83', F.Dob 85'; Begga 66'	
7	14 September 2000	MO Constantine	3 – 4	CR Belouizdad	Houhou 5', 45', Barrou 89'; Ali Moussa 9', 22', Bouaïcha 18', Badji 70'	
7	8 May 2003	ES Sétif	3 – 4	MO Constantine	Fellahi 13', 73', Mekhalfi 70', Azzizène 23', Boulemdaïs 47', 82', Bouaïcha 90',	
7	30 November 2006	WA Tlemcen	1 – 6	JSM Béjaïa	Chaïb 85'; Berguiga 23', 70', 78', Chaouch 28', 90', Lahmar 59'	
7	20 May 1999	WA Boufarik	1 – 6	MC Oran	Bouzidi 71'; Boumene 4', Gaid 15', Zerouki 35', Benhammou 46' Guesbaoui 65', Haddou 85'	
7	19 February 2007	MC Alger	4 – 3	CR Belouizdad	Badji 2', Bouguèche 5', Younes 13', Sidibé 42'; Amroune 3', Gana 59' (pen.), Aoudia 64'	
7	14 October 1999	USM Alger	4 – 3	USM Annaba	Souilah 40', Djahnine 42', Hadj Adlane 44', Amirat 67'; Ouichaoui 32', Fnides 57' (pen.), 72'	
7	21 October 1999	CR Belouizdad	4 – 3	MC Oran	Boutaleb 5', 47', Settara 57', Bounekdja 86'; Amrane 12', Meçabih 58', 75'	
7	8 December 2005	ASO Chlef	5 – 2	USM Annaba	Kechamli 11', Messaoud 42' (pen.), Zaouche 49', Boutouba 52', N’Diaye 67'; Bensaïd 79', Boucherit 85'	
7	25 May 2006	USM Alger	5 – 2	MC Oran	Belkheïr 13', 29', Ammour 66', 69', Camara 89'; Meddahi 28', Daoud 86'	
7	3 February 2002	CR Belouizdad	5 – 2	JSM Béjaïa	Boukessassa 21', Boudjakdi 37', Settara 42', 83', Talis 89'; Djilani 43' (pen.), Rahim 48'	
7	13 December 2001	AS Aïn M'lila	2 – 5	RC Kouba	Bakha 65' (pen.), Bacha 90+3'; Bouferma 1', 78', Khelfouni 46' (pen.), Bessaïd 64', Mesbah 90'	
7	17 February 2018	USM Bel-Abbès	2 – 5	MC Oran	Zouari 24' (pen.), Bouguettaya 85'; Bentiba 6', Mansouri 22', 38', Belal 69', Frifer 86'	
7	20 April 2018	ES Sétif	5 – 2	USM Blida	Benayad 3', 37', 73', Haddouche 9', Aït Ouamar 82'; Frioui 19', Aliouat 87'	
7	22 September 2018	MC Oran	4 – 3	MC Alger	Hammar 2', Mansouri 33', Nadji 37', Bouchar 75'; Bendebka 44', Nekkache 49', Amada 61'	
7	22 April 1999	ES Mostaganem	5 – 2	ASM Oran	Amrane 10', 88', Lakhel 13', Sayhi 57', 71'; Benchergui 89', Mezouer 90'	
7	23 September 2019	NA Hussein Dey	4 – 3	ES Sétif	Zerdoum 4', 20', 65', Boutmene 18'; Souibaâh 46', 53', Laribi 48'	
7	25 June 2001	CS Constantine	1 – 6	USM Alger	Asloune 55'; Baâzouz 25', Ammar Galoul 30', 44', 90+4', Asloune 55' (o.g.), Amirat 72'	
7	24 May 1999	US Chaouia	5 – 2	E Sour El Ghozlane	Sahnoun 44', 47' Abdennabi 45' (pen.) Boudchicha 50' Ghomari 61'; Saad 77' Benkacemi 83'	
7	4 February 2012	MC Saïda	6 – 1	AS Khroub	Sayah 16', Madouni 31', 53', 73', Teguedi 84', Zaoui 90+3'; Belaïli 58'	
7	12 March 2021	CS Constantine	5 – 2	RC Relizane	Lakdja 31', 53', Lamri 45+1', Amokrane 65', 83'; Balegh 3', Seguer 88'	

== Biggest winning margin ==
Goals margin	Date	Home team	Result	Away team	Goal Scorers	Ref
8	22 May 2021	ES Sétif	8 – 0	USM Bel Abbès	Djahnit 11' (pen.), Amoura 21', 33', Kendouci 23', Laouafi 63', Berbache 82', Ghacha 90+1', Saâdi 90+4' -	
7	13 June 2005	WA Tlemcen	8 – 1	MC Alger	Dahleb 44', Dif 45', 61', 88', Ouahid 50' (o.g.), Boulaïnceur 70', Benmoussa 86', Olawale 90'; Sidibé 83'	
7	1 July 2002	WA Tlemcen	8 – 1	CA Bordj Bou Arreridj	Bouchlaghem 6', 24', 45', Hachemi 21', 65' (pen.), Merrakchi 42', Dahleb 48', 49'; Rihi 82'	
7	24 December 1998	JS Kabylie	7 – 0	JSM Tébessa	Aït Tahar 5', 14', 30', 40', Ghazi 8', 15', 55' –	
6	26 October 2000	USM Blida	7 – 1	WA Tlemcen	Zouani 2', Kherkhache 60', 74', 86', Bakir 43', Khedraoui 45' (o.g.), Piracaïa 79'; Betouaf 68'	
6	12 May 2003	USM Alger	8 – 2	MC Oran	Ouichaoui 4', 20', 45', Djahnine 30', Achiou 40', Ammour 51', Dziri 54', Benchergui 88'; Berradja 39', Bermati 49'	
6	17 May 2010	CR Belouizdad	7 – 1	JS Kabylie	Abdat 2', Slimani 20', 24', 48', 69', Rebih 37' (pen.), Saïbi 90+1' (pen.); Tedjar 32' (pen.)	
6	18 September 2012	ES Sétif	6 – 0	CA Batna	Aoudia 20', 57', Ziti 28', El Okbi 30', Gourmi 62', Tiouli 71' –	
6	15 December 2012	USM Alger	6 – 0	USM Bel-Abbès	Gasmi 35' (pen.), Tedjar 59', Daham 69', 78', Bouchema 86', Djediat 90+2' –	
6	16 January 2010	USM Alger	6 – 0	CA Batna	Hamidi 32', 43', 58', 65', Daham 50', Benaldjia 80' –	
6	29 December 2003	JSM Béjaïa	0 – 6	USM Alger	– Ammour 11', Achiou 23', Benchergui 37', 88', Balbone 42', 45'	
6	27 May 2001	USM Annaba	6 – 0	USM El Harrach	– –	
6	11 December 1999	MC Oran	6 – 0	CA Batna	Gasbaoui 10', Megueni 32', 55', Meçabih 34', Mechri 62', Kherrif 79' –	
6	15 June 2000	MC Oran	6 – 0	USM Annaba	Mechri 13', 51', Amrane 20', 25', Kechamli 69', Megueni 74' –	
6	27 August 2016	USM Alger	6 – 0	RC Relizane	Bentoucha 6' (o.g.), Meftah 24' (pen.), Guessan 41', Benkhemassa 45', Andria 71', Darfalou 88' –	
6	12 February 2021	MC Oran	6 – 0	US Biskra	Hamidi 32', Guenina 48', Benamar 50', Motrani 71', Bentiba 85', Belloumi 90+1' –	
6	20 February 2021	ASO Chlef	0 – 6	JS Saoura	– Lahmeri 14', Kaidi 37', Zaidi 45', 57', Messaoudi 60', Yahia-Chérif 77'	
6	8 June 2021	JSM Skikda	0 – 6	CR Belouizdad	– Selmi 17', Khalfallah 32', 33', Merzougui 42', Sayoud 43', Tabti 64'	
