= Yasin =

Yasin, Yassin, Yassine, Yacine, Yaseen, etc. may refer to:

== People ==
- Yaseen (name), an Arabic-based name
- Yasin (name), an Arabic-based name
- Yassin (name), an Arabic-based name
- Yassine (name), an Arabic-based name
- Yacine (name), an Arabic-based name
- Yaşın (name), a Turkish-based name

== Places ==
- Yasin Valley, a valley in the Hindu Kush mountains of Pakistan
  - Yasin Tehsil, an administrative unit within the Yasin Valley

== Other ==
- Quanzhou Yassin F.C., a Chinese football club
- HESA Yasin, 2019 Iranian aircraft
- Yasin (rapper) also known as Yasin Byn, Swedish hip hop artist
- Yasin (RPG), a rocket-propelled grenade also known as Yassin or Al-Yassin
- Ya-Sin, the 36th chapter in the Qur'an

== See also ==
- Yasinia, an urban settlement in Ukraine
- Iacin, Murcian variant of the name Joachim
- Jasin (disambiguation)
