= 2004–05 Algerian Championnat National =

Algerian Championnat National
- Season: 2004–05
- Champions: USM Alger
- Relegated: OMR El Annasser; GC Mascara; US Chaouia
- Matches: 240
- Goals: 542 (2.26 per match)
- Top goalscorer: Hamid Berguiga (18 goals)
- Biggest home win: WA Tlemcen 8–1 MC Alger
- Biggest away win: MC Alger 1–4 CS Constantine; CR Belouizdad 0–3 USM Alger; CR Belouizdad 0–3 NA Hussein Dey; MC Oran 0–3 OMR El Annasser; US Chaouia 0–3 ES Sétif
- Highest scoring: WA Tlemcen 8–1 MC Alger

The 2004–05 Algerian Championnat National was the 43rd season of the Algerian Championnat National since its establishment in 1962. A total of 16 teams contested the league, with JS Kabylie as the defending champions, The Championnat started on August 20, 2004. and ended on June 13, 2005.

== Team summaries ==
=== Promotion and relegation ===
Teams promoted from Algerian Division 2 2004–2005

- Paradou AC
- CA Batna
- US Biskra

Teams relegated to Algerian Division 2 2005–2006

- OMR El Annasser
- GC Mascara
- US Chaouia

== Results ==
=== League table ===
Pos	Team	Pld	W	D	L	GF	GA	GD	Pts	Qualification or relegation
1	USM Alger (C)	30	21	4	5	55	27	+28	67	Qualification for the 2006 CAF Champions League
2	JS Kabylie	30	16	6	8	44	22	+22	54	Qualification for the 2006 CAF Champions League
3	MC Alger	30	14	7	9	39	44	−5	49	Qualification for the 2005–06 Arab Champions League
4	NA Hussein Dey	30	11	10	9	29	19	+10	43	Qualification for the 2006 CAF Confederation Cup
5	CA Bordj Bou Arreridj	30	10	13	7	32	25	+7	43	Qualification for the 2005–06 Arab Champions League
6	USM Blida	30	11	9	10	36	29	+7	42	
7	ASO Chlef	30	10	11	9	30	32	−2	41	Qualification for the 2006 CAF Confederation Cup
8	CS Constantine	30	11	7	12	33	42	−9	40	
9	MC Oran	30	10	9	11	36	37	−1	39	
10	WA Tlemcen	30	11	5	14	36	27	+9	38	
11	ES Sétif	30	11	5	14	37	36	+1	38	
12	USM Annaba	30	9	10	11	30	37	−7	37	
13	CR Belouizdad	30	10	6	14	25	34	−9	36	
14	OMR El Annasser (R)	30	8	11	11	31	34	−3	35	Relegation to Ligue Professionnelle 2
15	GC Mascara (R)	30	8	6	16	33	48	−15	30	Relegation to Ligue Professionnelle 2
16	US Chaouia (R)	30	5	7	18	16	49	−33	22	Relegation to Ligue Professionnelle 2

Updated to match(es) played on 13 June 2005. Source: DZFoot
Rules for classification: 1) points; 2) head-to-head points; 3) head-to-head goal difference; 4) goal difference; 5) total goals; 6) fairplay ranking; 7) playoff.
(C) Champions; (R) Relegated

=== Result table ===
Home \ Away	ASC	CBA	CRB	CSC	ESS	GCM	JSK	MCA	MCO	NAH	OMREA	USC	UAL	USMA	USB	WAT
ASO Chlef		1–1	1–0	1–0	1–0	1–0	1–1	0–0	2–1	1–1	1–1	2–1	1–2	1–0	1–0	0–0
CA Bordj Bou Arreridj	0–0		0–1	1–1	1–0	1–0	0–0	3–1	2–0	0–0	0–0	1–0	3–0	3–0	2–0	2–1
CR Belouizdad	2–1	2–1		2–0	1–1	2–1	0–1	0–0	3–2	0–3	1–1	1–0	0–3	3–0	2–1	1–1
CS Constantine	2–2	1–0	3–0		2–0	2–1	1–1	2–4	0–1	0–0	3–2	1–1	1–3	1–0	0–1	1–0
ES Sétif	2–0	2–2	2–0	0–1		5–3	2–0	0–2	3–1	1–2	3–0	3–1	1–2	1–2	2–1	1–1
GC Mascara	1–3	3–2	1–0	1–1	0–0		1–0	1–2	1–1	1–0	1–0	4–1	1–1	1–3	1–0	1–1
JS Kabylie	3–0	2–1	3–0	4–1	1–0	3–1		6–1	1–0	0–0	1–0	3–0	2–1	0–0	1–0	2–0
MC Alger	2–1	0–1	1–0	1–4	3–0	1–0	2–1		1–0	0–0	2–3	2–0	1–2	0–0	1–0	1–1
MC Oran	3–2	2–2	1–1	3–0	1–0	2–1	2–1	2–2		0–0	0–3	4–0	2–1	3–0	0–0	0–0
NA Hussein Dey	2–0	1–1	2–1	0–1	0–1	1–2	1–0	0–1	1–0		1–0	5–0	1–2	1–0	1–1	2–0
OMR El Annasser	2–1	0–0	0–0	3–0	0–1	4–2	1–1	1–2	1–1	1–0		0–0	1–3	2–1	0–1	0–1
US Chaouia	0–0	0–0	1–0	1–1	0–3	2–1	0–1	0–0	3–0	2–1	0–1		0–0	1–0	1–3	1–1
USM Alger	1–0	2–0	0–1	3–0	3–2	1–0	2–1	1–2	2–1	1–0	4–1	3–0		2–2	4–1	2–1
USM Annaba	1–1	2–0	1–0	2–1	1–0	0–1	0–2	3–1	0–1	2–2	2–2	2–1	1–1		2–2	1–0
USM Blida	2–2	1–1	1–0	4–1	3–0	2–0	2–1	3–1	1–1	0–1	0–0	3–0	0–2	1–1		2–0
WA Tlemcen	1–2	2–1	1–0	0–1	1–1	5–1	1–0	8–1	2–0	0–0	1–1	1–0	0–1	1–1	0–0	

Updated to match(es) played on 13 June 2005. Source: rsssf
Legend: Blue = home team win; Yellow = draw; Red = away team win.

== Season statistics ==
=== Top scorers ===
Rank	Scorer	Club	Goals
1	(Algeria) Hamid Berguiga	JS Kabylie	18
2	(Algeria) Billel Dziri	USM Alger	11
3	(Algeria) Noureddine Daham	MC Alger	11
4	(Algeria) Nabil Hemani	OMR El Annasser	11
5	(Algeria) Adel El Hadi	USM Annaba	10
6	(Algeria) Sofiane Daoud	MC Oran	10
7	(Algeria) Hocine Fenier	CS Constantine	10
8	(Cameroon) Stéphane Nankop	CA Bordj Bou Arreridj	10
9	(Algeria) Samir Alliche	NA Hussein Dey	10
10	(Algeria) Farid Touil	USM Blida	9
11	(Algeria) Karim Braham Chaouch	MC Alger	9
12	(Algeria) Yacine Boulaïncer	WA Tlemcen	8
13	(Algeria) El Yacine Derradj	ES Sétif	8
14	(Nigeria) Michael Eneramo	USM Alger	7
15	(Algeria) Hamza Yacef	NA Hussein Dey	7
16	(Algeria) Redouane Benzerga	MC Oran	7
