= 2006 Algerian Cup final =

- Stade du 5 Juillet hosted the match
- Event: 2005–06 Algerian Cup
MC Alger	USM Alger
2	1
- Date: June 15, 2006
- Venue: Stade 5 Juillet 1962, Algiers
- Referee: Djamel Haimoudi
- Attendance: 70,000

The 2006 Algerian Cup final was the 42nd final of the Algerian Cup. The final took place on June 15, 2006, at Stade 5 Juillet 1962 in Algiers with kick-off at 16:00. MC Alger beat USM Alger 1–0 to win their sixth Algerian Cup.

Algerian Ligue Professionnelle 1 clubs MC Alger and USM Alger will contest the final, in what will be the 75th edition of the Algiers Derby. The competition winners are awarded a berth in the 2007 CAF Confederation Cup.

== Pre-match ==
=== Details ===
June 15, 2006
16:00

MC Alger	2–1	USM Alger
Noureddine Daham 42', 50' (pen.)	Report (in French)	85' Mintou Doucoure

Stade 5 Juillet 1962, Algiers
Attendance: 70.000
Referee: Djamel Haimoudi

MC Alger	USM Alger

1	(Algeria) Merouane Abdouni
5	(Algeria) Smaïl Chaoui		(yellow card) 54'
4	(Algeria) Kamel Bouacida
12	(Mali) Moussa Coulibaly
15	(Algeria) Réda Babouche
10	(Algeria) Fodil Hadjadj	(substituted off) 72'	(yellow card) 15'
6	(Algeria) Zoubir Zemit
8	(Algeria) Fayçal Badji (c)
29	(Algeria) Sofiane Younes
11	(Algeria) Noureddine Daham
19	(Algeria) Hadj Bouguèche	(substituted off) 85'	(yellow card) 61'
Substitutes :
21	(Algeria) Kamel Maouche	(substituted on) 72'
23	(Algeria) Yacine Hamadou	(substituted on) 85'
30	(Algeria) Sofiane Azzedine
20	(Algeria) Ismaël Bouzid
7	(Algeria) Ammar Largot
9	(Algeria) Mohamed Badache
Manager :
(France) François Bracci

1	(Algeria) Lamine Zemmamouche
29	(Algeria) Abdelkader Besseghir		(yellow card) 25'
2	(Algeria) Mohamed Hamdoud (c)
18	(Algeria) Rabah Deghmani
17	(Algeria) Moulay Haddou	(substituted off) 52'
28	(Algeria) Karim Ghazi		(yellow card) 36' (yellow-red card) 40'
6	(Algeria) Farid Djahnine	(substituted off) 71'
8	(Algeria) Billel Dziri
26	(Algeria) Hocine Metref
7	(Algeria) Amar Ammour
10	(Algeria) Hocine Achiou		(yellow card) 70'
Substitutes :
30	(Algeria) Farouk Belkaid	(substituted on) 52'
9	(Mali) Mintou Doucoure	(substituted on) 71'
24	(Algeria) Karim Saoula
5	(Algeria) Mounir Zeghdoud
20	(Algeria) Mahieddine Meftah
22	(Algeria) Mohamed Boussefiane
Manager :
(Algeria) Mustapha Biskri

MATCH OFFICIALS

- Assistant referees:
  - Amar Taleb
  - Ahmed Kaid
- Fourth official:
  - Mohamed Zekrini

MAN OF THE MATCH

- (Algeria) Noureddine Daham (MC Alger)

MATCH RULES

- 90 minutes.
- 30 minutes of extra-time if necessary.
- Penalty shootout if scores still level.
- Seven named substitutes.
- Maximum of three substitutions.
