= 2005–06 Algerian Championnat National =

Algerian Championnat National
- Season: 2005–06
- Champions: JS Kabylie
- Relegated: CS Constantine; USM Annaba; US Biskra
- 2007 CAF Champions League: JS Kabylie; USM Alger
- 2007 CAF Confederation Cup: ASO Chlef; MC Alger (Cup winner)
- 2006–07 Arab Champions League: MC Alger; ES Setif; CA Bordj Bou Arreridj
- Matches: 240
- Goals: 520 (2.17 per match)
- Top goalscorer: Hamid Berguiga (18 goals)
- Biggest home win: JS Kabylie 5 - 0 US Biskra
- Biggest away win: MC Oran 2 - 6 Paradou AC
- Highest scoring: MC Oran 2 - 6 Paradou AC

The 2005–06 Algerian Championnat National was the 44th season of the Algerian Championnat National since its establishment in 1962. A total of 16 teams contested the league, with USM Alger as the defending champions.

== Team summaries ==
=== Promotion and relegation ===
Teams promoted from Algerian Division 2 2005-2006

- OMR El Annasser
- JSM Bejaïa
- ASM Oran

Teams relegated to Algerian Division 2 2006-2007

- CS Constantine
- USM Annaba
- US Biskra

== League table ==
Pos	Team	Pld	W	D	L	GF	GA	GD	Pts	Qualification or relegation
1	JS Kabylie (C)	30	17	7	6	47	21	+26	58	2007 CAF Champions League
2	USM Alger	30	18	6	6	50	30	+20	57 (Note: USM Alger were deducted three points)	2007 CAF Champions League
3	ASO Chlef	30	15	7	8	45	25	+20	52	2007 CAF Confederation Cup
4	ES Sétif	30	14	5	11	30	26	+4	47	2006–07 Arab Champions League
5	CA Bordj Bou Arreridj	30	13	7	10	22	24	−2	46	2006–07 Arab Champions League
6	MC Alger	30	13	5	12	42	35	+7	44	2007 CAF Confederation Cup
7	Paradou AC	30	11	7	12	36	38	−2	40	
8	CR Belouizdad	30	11	7	12	30	31	−1	40	
9	USM Blida	30	10	8	12	26	30	−4	38	
10	NA Hussein Dey	30	10	8	12	27	35	−8	38	
11	CA Batna	30	11	5	14	32	35	−3	38	
12	MC Oran	30	10	7	13	35	42	−7	37	
13	WA Tlemcen	30	10	7	13	25	33	−8	37	
14	CS Constantine (R)	30	10	6	14	27	36	−9	36	2006-07 Division 2
15	USM Annaba (R)	30	10	5	15	33	40	−7	35	2006-07 Division 2
16	US Biskra (R)	20	3	11	6	13	39	−26	20	2006-07 Division 2

Source: DZFOOT.COM
Rules for classification: 1) points; 2) goal difference; 3) number of goals scored.
(C) Champions; (R) Relegated

== Season statistics ==
=== Top scorers ===
Rank	Scorer	Club	Goals
1	(Algeria) Hamid Berguiga	JS Kabylie	18
2	(Algeria) Mohamed Messaoud	ASO Chlef	15
3	(Algeria) Isaad Bourahli	ES Sétif	14
4	(Algeria) Noureddine Daham	MC Alger	13
5	(Algeria) Fares Djabelkheir	USM Annaba	10
5	(Algeria) Lamouri Djediat	Paradou AC	10
5	(Algeria) Moulay Haddou	USM Alger	10
8	(Algeria) Seif Eddine Amroune	CS Constantine	9
