= Taha (name) =

Male given name

Taaha (Arabic: طه) is the combination of two letters "Ta" and "Ha". It is the first verse of surah Ta-Ha in the Quran and one of the mysterious letters (Muqattaʿat).

== Given name ==
- Taha Othman Ahmad, known as Odetari (born 2000), American singer, rapper, and record producer
- Mullah Taha, first openly queer Shia Muslim cleric
- Taha Akgül (born 1990), Turkish sport wrestler
- Taha Al-Abid (born 1972), Palestinian poet
- Taha Ali, (born 1998) Swedish footballer born to Somali parents
- Taha Hussein (1889–1973), Egyptian writer and intellectual
- Taha Malik (born 1987), Pakistani-American record producer, musician, rapper and film score composer
- Taha Subhi Falaha, better known as Abu Mohammad al-Adnani (1977–2016), Syrian-born militant leader who was the official spokesperson and a senior leader of the Islamic State
- Taha Yassin Ramadan (1938–2007), former Iraqi vice-president

== Surname ==
- Abdul-Razzaq Ahmed Taha, Iraqi chess player
- Alaihuddin Taha (born 1958), Bruneian diplomat
- Hamdan Taha, Palestinian archaeologist
- Hissein Brahim Taha, Chadian politician leader
- Khalil Taha (1932–2020), Lebanese wrestler
- Mahmoud Taha (born 1942), Jordanian artist
- Mahmoud Mohammed Taha (1909–1985), martyr for liberal Islam
- Paolo Taha (born 1990), Filipino basketball player
- Rachid Taha (1958–2018), Algerian singer
- Mohammad Toaha (1922–1987), Bangladeshi politician
- Riad Taha (1927–1980), Lebanese journalist and president of the Lebanese Publishers Association
- Walid Taha (born 1968), Israeli Arab politician
- Wasil Taha (born 1952), Arab member of the Knesset
- Yousef Taha (born 1988), Filipino basketball player

== Places ==
- La Taha, municipality in the Alpujarras region of the province of Granada, Spain

== See also ==
- Taha (disambiguation)
- Yasin (name)
- Arabic name
