= Taha =

Taha (Arabic: طه) is an Arabic male given name. It is the name of the 20th surah of the Quran, سورة طه ("surah taha"), and is considered by some to refer to the prophet Muhammad.

Taha may refer to:

- Ta-Ha, the 20th surah of the Qur'an
- Taha (name), a male given name and a surname
- Taha, Ghana, a community in Tamale Metropolitan District in the Northern Region of Ghana
