= Mohammad Yasin =

Mohammad Yasin may refer to:

- Mohammad Yasin (cricketer) (born 1992), Pakistani cricketer
- Mohammad Yasin (politician) (born 1971), British MP for Bedford since 2017
- Mohammad Yasin (weightlifter), Indonesian weightlifter
- Mohammed Yasin Malik (born 1966), Kashmiri separatist
- Muhammad Yasin Mazhar Siddiqi (1944–2020), Indian Muslim scholar and historian
- Mohammad Yasin Shah (1950–2020), Indian politician
- Mo Yasin, Pakistani squash player active in the 1970s
- Muhammad Yasin, Indonesian police officer
- Mohammed Yaseen, Iraqi weightlifter
- Mohammad Yeasin (died 1999), Bangladeshi development worker
- Muhammad Yaseen, Canadian politician
- Mohamed Yassin, Swedish politician
- Hakeem Mohammad Yaseen Shah or Hakeem Yasin, Indian politician
