= 2008–09 Algerian Championnat National =

Algerian Championnat National
- Season: 2008–09
- Dates: 7 August 2008 – 28 May 2009
- Champions: ES Sétif
- Relegated: MC Saïda; RC Kouba
- 2010 CAF Champions League: ES Sétif; JS Kabylie
- 2010 CAF Confederation Cup: JSM Béjaïa; CR Belouizdad (Cup winner)
- Matches: 272
- Goals: 567 (2.08 per match)
- Top goalscorer: Mohamed Messaoud (19 goals)

The 2008–09 Algerian Championnat National was the 47th season of the Algerian Championnat National since its establishment in 1962. A total of 17 teams contested the league, with MC Alger as the defending champions.

On May 29, 2009, ES Sétif were crowned champions with two games remaining after beating USM El Harrach 2-1.

== RCK & FAF case ==
On August 20, 2008, the Court of Arbitration for Sport in Lausanne forced the club's integration into the Algerian first division championship for the 2008-09 season while investigating the conflict between the Algerian Football Federation (FAF) and the club. This case is linked to the arbitrary decision taken by the FAF to impose a sanction against the RCK without having full evidence in the case. The sanction carries a match lost automatically against USM El Harrach and three points penalty for having played a player under a false identity during the RC Kouba & USM El Harrach match counting for the 37th and penultimate day of the Algerian Division 2 season 2007–08 (ended 0-0).

This resulted in RC Kouba resetting the 5th position and the rise of USM El Harrach to 3rd position in the general classification, synonymous with accession to the Algerian first division. Thus and although the club has lodged appeals with the Algerian sports authorities, this decision will not be annulled, which leads the club to seize the international CAS, while the first division matches have already started. Finally, the CAS decided to cancel the sanction taken by the FAF and ordered the integration of the club into the first division for the 2008–09 season, then approved the club's accession on September 29, 20086. The change was ratified by the FAF on October 26, 20087, and the 2008–09 Algerian Championnat National was played with 17 clubs.

== League table ==
Pos	Team	Pld	W	D	L	GF	GA	GD	Pts	Qualification or relegation
1	ES Sétif (C, Q)	32	18	8	6	52	25	+27	62	2010 CAF Champions League
2	JS Kabylie (Q)	32	15	14	3	38	19	+19	59	2010 CAF Champions League
3	JSM Béjaïa	32	15	8	9	33	20	+13	53	
4	CR Belouizdad (Q)	32	15	5	12	33	27	+6	50	2010 CAF Confederation Cup
5	MC Alger	32	13	10	9	40	38	+2	49	
6	USM Alger	32	13	9	10	38	31	+7	48	
7	CA Bordj Bou Arréridj	32	14	7	11	34	33	+1	48 (Note: CA Bordj Bou Arréridj were docked one point)	
8	MC El Eulma	32	13	7	12	37	35	+2	46	
9	ASO Chlef	32	11	11	10	40	43	−3	44	
10	USM Annaba	32	11	8	13	31	34	−3	41	
11	USM El Harrach	32	10	10	12	36	40	−4	40	
12	AS Khroub	32	9	12	11	30	37	−7	39	
13	NA Hussein Dey	32	10	9	13	28	35	−7	39	
14	MSP Batna	32	10	8	14	26	35	−9	38	
15	USM Blida	32	8	9	15	23	31	−8	33	
16	MC Saïda (R)	32	7	8	17	25	40	−15	29	Relegation to 2009-10 Algerian Championnat National 2
17	RC Kouba (R)	32	6	5	21	23	44	−21	23	Relegation to 2009-10 Algerian Championnat National 2

Source: DZFoot 1er Division 2008-2009
Rules for classification: 1) points; 2) goal difference; 3) number of goals scored.
(C) Champions; (Q) Qualified for the phase indicated; (R) Relegated

== Season statistics ==
=== Top scorers ===
Rank	Scorer	Club	Goals
1	(Algeria) Mohamed Messaoud	ASO Chlef	19
2	(Algeria) Lamouri Djediat	ES Sétif	12
3	(Algeria) Nabil Hemani	ES Sétif	11
3	(Cameroon) Gérard Mongolo	MC El Eulma	11
5	(Algeria) Adlène Bensaïd	JS Kabylie	9
5	(Algeria) Youcef Saïbi	USM El Harrach	9
7	(Algeria) Hamza Boulemdaïs	JSM Béjaïa	8
7	(Algeria) Ramzi Bourakba	USM El Harrach	8
7	(Algeria) Cheikh Hamidi	USM Annaba/USM Alger	8
7	(Algeria) Farès Hamiti	USM Blida	8
7	(Mali) Rafan Sidibé	MSP Batna	8
7	(Algeria) Abdelmalek Ziaya	ES Sétif	8
