= Yassine (name) =

Yassine (Arabic: ياسين, IPA: [jæːˈsiːn]) is a given name, an alternative of Yasin, Yassin, Yaseen and Yacine. The name is most common in North Africa. The name is derived from a chapter (surah) of the Quran called Ya-Sin. It is an epithet of the Islamic prophet Muhammad.

== Notable persons ==
=== Given name ===
- Yassine Abdellaoui (born 1975), Dutch–Moroccan footballer
- Yassine Bensghir (born 1983), Moroccan middle-distance runner
- Yassine Boukhari (born 1986), Algerian footballer
- Yassine Chikhaoui (born 1986), Tunisian footballer
- Yassine Diboun (born 1978), American ultra-runner
- Yassine El Ghanassy (born 1990), Moroccan footballer
- Yassine Mahi, 2022 Brussels stabbing suspect

=== Surname ===
- Abdesslam Yassine (born 1928), leader of a Moroccan Islamist organisation
- Ismail Yassine (1912−1972), Egyptian actor and comedian
- Nadia Yassine (born 1958), daughter of Abdesslam, head of the feminine branch of the same organisation

== See also ==
- Ahmed Yassin (born 1937), Palestinian imam and politician, founder of Hamas
- Salle Ibn Yassine, indoor sporting arena in Rabat, Morocco
- Yasin (name), disambiguation
- Yassin (name), disambiguation
- Yacine (name), disambiguation
