= Jasin =

Jasin may refer to:

- Jasin District in Malacca, Malaysia
- Jasin, Malacca, a town in Jasin District
- Jasin (federal constituency) in Malacca, Malaysia
- Jasin, Kuyavian-Pomeranian Voivodeship, a village in north-central Poland
- Jasin, Greater Poland Voivodeship a village in west-central Poland
- Jasin, Tanzania a village in Tanzania also known as Jassini

== See also ==
- Yasin (disambiguation)
