= Yacine (name) =

Yacine is the French version of the Arabic name Yasin (Arabic: ياسين, IPA: [jæːˈsiːn]). It is common in North Africa. The name comes from a chapter (surah) of the Quran called Ya-Sin. It is an epithet of the Islamic prophet Muhammad.

== Notable persons ==
=== Given name ===
- Yacine Abdessadki (born 1981), French-born Moroccan football midfielder
- Yacine Aït-Sahalia (born 1966), Algerian-American economist
- Yacine Akhnouche, joint citizen of France and Algeria who confessed to having ties to Al Qaeda
- Yacine Amaouche (born 1979), Algerian footballer
- Yacine Benalia, Algerian-born Islamist militant, allegedly participated in the Beslan school hostage crisis in 2004
- Yacine Bentaala (born 1955), former Algerian international who played as a goalkeeper
- Yacine Bezzaz (born 1981), Algerian football midfielder
- Yacine Brahimi (born 1990), French football player of Algerian descent
- Yacine Diallo (1897–1954), politician from Guinea who served in the French National Assembly from 1946 to 1954
- Yacine Douma (born 1973), French judoka
- Yacine Elghorri, animator, illustrator, storyboard artist, conceptual designer and comic book artist
- Yacine Haddou (born 1989), French professional football player
- Yacine Hima (born 1984), Algerian footballer
- Yacine Kechout (born 1982), Algerian football player
- Khady Yacine Ngom (born 1979), female Senegalese basketball player
- Yacine Qasmi (born 1991), French-born Moroccan football player
- Yacine Si Salem (born 1988), French-Algerian football player
- Yacine Slatni (born 1973), retired Algerian professional footballer

=== Surname ===
- Kateb Yacine (1929–1989), Algerian writer of novels and plays and advocate of the Algerian Berber cause

== See also ==
- Medina Yacine Ba, village in Senegal
- Yasin
- Yassin
- Yassine
- Yaseen
