= Yassin (name) =

Yassin, an alternative of Yasin, Yassine, Yaseen, Yacine, Yesine, Yessine and Yessin (Arabic: ياسين, romanized: Yāsīn, IPA: [jæːˈsiːn]), is a masculine given name mostly common in the Arab world and Muslim countries, and a surname. The name comes from a chapter (surah) of the Quran called Ya-Sin. People with this name generally originate from Turkey, Bangladesh, Pakistan, Afghanistan, Iraq, Syria, Azerbaijan, Morocco, Algeria, Tunisia, Saudi Arabia, Jordan, Palestine, Egypt, and Lebanon.

== Notable persons ==
=== Given name ===
- Yassin Adnan (born 1970), Moroccan writer and broadcaster
- Yassin M. Aref, American prisoner
- Yassin Ayoub (born 1994), Dutch-Moroccan footballer
- Yassin El-Azzouzi (born 1983), French-Moroccan footballer
- Yassin Barnawi (born 1993), Saudi Arabian footballer
- Yassin Bouih (born 1996), Italian middle-distance runner
- Yassin Chadili (born 1988), French footballer
- Yassin Daoussi (born 2000), Finnish footballer
- Yassin Fekir (born 1997), French footballer
- Yassin Fortuné (born 1999), French footballer
- Yassin Hamzah (born 1990), Saudi Arabian footballer
- Yassin Ibrahim (born 2000), German footballer
- Yassin Idbihi (born 1983), German basketball player
- Yassin Kadi (born 1955), Saudi Arabian businessman
- Yassin Mikari, Tunisian-Swiss footballer
- Yassin Maouche (born 1997), French footballer
- Yassin Moutaouakil (born 1986), French footballer
- Yassin Oukili (born 2001), Dutch footballer
- Yassin al-Haj Saleh (born 1961), Syrian writer and political dissident
- Yessin Rahmouni (born 1984), Olympic dressage rider

=== Surname ===
- Abed Yassin (born 2004), Palestinian footballer
- Ahmed Yassin (1937–2004), Palestinian imam and politician and founder of Hamas
- Anwar Yassin, Lebanese former detainee in Israeli prisons, member of the Popular Guard, the armed wing of the Lebanese Communist Party (LCP), and the broader Lebanese National Resistance Front
- Asser Yassin (born 1981), Egyptian actor, writer and film producer
- Essam Yassin (born 1987), Iraqi footballer
- Hussein Yassin (born 1943), Palestinian writer
- Kamarul Ariffin Mohamed Yassin (born 1934), Malaysian chairman of the World Scout Committee
- Mohamed Yassin (born 1980), Swedish politician
- Muhyiddin Yassin (born 1947), Malaysian politician and prime minister
- Nuseir Yassin (born 1992), Palestinian-Israeli video blogger best known for his video series Nas Daily
- Omar Rabie Yassin (born 1988), Egyptian footballer
- Osama Yassin (born 1964), Egyptian politician and minister of youth
- Rabie Yassin (born 1960), Egyptian footballer and football manager
- Ismail Yassin (born 1912), was an Egyptian actor and script writer, He was known for his slapstick humor and has been compared to Charlie Chaplin

== See also ==
- Yasin (name)
- Yassine (name)
- Yacine (name)
- Yaseen (name)
