= 2005–06 Algerian Cup =

- Stade du 5 Juillet hosted the final

Tournament details
- Country: Algeria

Final positions
- Champions: MC Alger (5th title)
- Runners-up: USM Alger

The 2005–06 Algerian Cup was the 42nd edition of the Algerian Cup in the sport of football. MC Alger won the Cup by defeating city rivals USM Alger 2–1 in the final with two goals from Noureddine Daham. It was MC Alger's fifth Algerian Cup in its history and its first in 23 years.

== Round of 16 ==
Tie no	Home team	Score	Away team
1	AS Khroub	0–1	NA Hussein Dey
2	ASM Oran	1–1 (4-3 p)	MC El Eulma
3	CA Bordj Bou Arreridj	0–1 (a.e.t)	RC Kouba
4	MC Alger	2–0	CRB Dar El Beida
5	CS Constantine	0–1	WA Tlemcen
6	ES Sétif	3–1	US Biskra
7	ES Guelma	0–1 (a.e.t)	JS Kabylie
8	USM Alger	2–0 (a.e.t)	USM Annaba

== Quarter-finals ==
Tie no	Home team	Score	Away team
1	ES Sétif	1–2	MC Alger
2	WA Tlemcen	2–1 (a.e.t)	ASM Oran
3	RC Kouba	0–0 (1-4 p)	USM Alger
4	NA Hussein Dey	1–1 (2-4 p)	JS Kabylie

4 May 2006

ES Sétif	1–2	MC Alger
Isâad Bourahli 90' (pen.)	Report	Sofiane Younès 37'; Faycal Badji 62'

Stade Communal, Bouira
Referee: Mohamed Benouza

4 May 2006

WA Tlemcen	2–1 (a.e.t)	ASM Oran
Samir Hadjou 74'; Mokhtar Benmoussa 107'	Report	Cheïkh Benzerga 22'

Sidi Bel-Abbes
Referee: Mansouri

4 May 2006

RC Kouba	0–0	USM Alger
	Report
Penalties
	1–4

Stade 5 Juillet, Algiers
Referee: Mohamed Bichari

1 June 2006

NA Hussein Dey	1–1	JS Kabylie
Sid Ahmed Khedis 46'	Report	Hamid Berguiga 11'
Penalties
	2–4

Stade Olympique, Boumerdès
Referee: Belahcène

== Semi-finals ==
Tie no	Home team	Score	Away team
1	USM Alger	0–0 (3-2 p)	JS Kabylie
2	MC Alger	3–1	WA Tlemcen

8 June 2006

USM Alger	0–0	JS Kabylie
	Report
Penalties
	2–3

Stade Mustapha Tchaker, Blida
Referee: Belkacem

8 June 2006

MC Alger	3–1	WA Tlemcen
Sofiane Younès 11'; Noureddine Daham 66' (90)	Report	Ismaïl Benyamina 89'

Stade OPOW, Mostaganem
Referee: Khélifi

== Final ==
Kickoff times are in local time.

15 June 2006

MC Alger	2–1	USM Alger
Noureddine Daham 42', 50' (pen.)	Report	Mintou Doucoure 85'

Stade 5 Juillet, Alger
Attendance: 70,000
Referee: Djamel Haïmoudi

== Champions ==
Algerian Cup
2006–07 Winners

MC Alger
5th Title
