= Yaseen (name) =

Arabic masculine given name

Yaseen (Arabic: ياسين, IPA: [jæːˈsiːn]) is an Arabic-based name and a variant of Yasin, Yassin, Yassine and Yacine. It is an Arabic-based unisex name used frequently in the Arab World and Muslim countries, and a surname. The name comes from a chapter (surah) of the Quran called Ya-Sin. It is an epithet of the Islamic prophet Muhammad.

It may refer to:

== Notable persons ==
=== Given name ===
- Yaseen Anwar (born 1951), Pakistani-American banker, Governor of the State Bank of Pakistan
- Yaseen Al-Bakhit (born 1989), Jordanian footballer
- Yaseen Bhatkal, or Yasin Bhatkal, full name Mohammed Ahmed Siddibappa, named by Indian investigative agencies, was the founder and leader of the proscribed terrorist organisation Indian Mujahideen
- Yaseen El-Demerdash, American Paralympic swimmer
- Yaseen Khan Khalil, Pakistani politician, Member of the Provincial Assembly of Khyber Pakhtunkhwa
- Yaseen Malik or Yasin Malik (born 1966), Kashmiri separatist leader and former militant who advocates the separation of Kashmir from both India and Pakistan
- Yaseen janjua (born 1988), journalist from Jammu and Kashmir, India
- Yaseen Akhtar Misbahi, Sunni Sufi Islamic scholar associated with the Ahle Sunnat Barelvi organisation, Raza Academy.
- Yaseen al-Sheyadi (born 1994), Omani footballer
- Yaseen Valli (born 1995), South African cricketer
- Yaseen Vallie (born 1989), South African cricketer
- Yasin Tarabar (born 2001), American scholar, athlete, and musician [1] [2] [3]

=== Middle name ===
- Rosa Yaseen Hassan, Syrian novelist and writer
- Mohammed Yaseen Mohammed (born 1963), Iraqi weightlifter
- Taha Yasin Ramadan (1938–2007), Iraqi Kurd politician, who served as one of the three Vice Presidents of Iraq

=== Surname ===
- Abdulla Yaseen (born 1998), Bahraini handball player
- Ahmed Yaseen or Yassin (1937–2004), Palestinian imam, politician, and founder of Hamas
- Anas Bani Yaseen (born 1988), Jordanian footballer
- Bashar Bani Yaseen (born 1977), Jordanian footballer
- Khalid Kamal Yaseen (born 1982), Bahraini long-distance runner
- Moataz Yaseen (born 1982), Jordanian footballer
- Mohammed Dawood Yaseen (born 2000), Iraqi footballer
- Muhammad Yaseen, Canadian politician, elected member of the Alberta Legislature
- Taha Hussein Yaseen (born 1998), Iraqi sprinter specialising in the 400 metres
- Mohd Yaseen Khan (Yaseen Janjua) (born 1988), journalist from Jammu and Kashmir, India
