= Taha Alabed =

Palestinian poet, writer and voice actor

Taha Alabed (Arabic: طه العبد) is a Palestinian poet, writer and voice actor. He was born in Beirut in 1972.

== Bibliography ==
- Al Kifayat Al Sawtiya (2014)

== Filmography ==
=== Television ===
- Bayn Amwaj El Zaman (writer)
- Shu'ara Rathaw Anfusahom (writer)
- Wa Fi Anfusikum Afala Tufakiroun (writer)
- Atraf El Haywanat Fi El Alam (writer)
- Khoyout El Adala (writer)

=== Dubbing roles ===
- Deadly 60
- Mokhtarnameh - Za'da
- Prophet Joseph - Kidamen
- Ratatouille - Skinner (Classical Arabic version)
- Treasure Planet - John Silver (Classical Arabic version)
- Up - Dug (Classical Arabic version)
