= Faris Khenniche =

Algerian footballer (born 1981)

Personal information
- Full name: Faris Khenniche
- Date of birth: 12 August 1981 (age 45)
- Place of birth: Sétif, Algeria
- Height: 1.75 m (5 ft 9 in)
- Position: Midfielder

Team information
- Current team: MC Alger

Youth career
- Créteil

Senior career*
Years	Team	Apps	(Gls)
2004–2009	Créteil	41	(3)
2009–	MC Alger		
- * Club domestic league appearances and goals

Faris Khenniche (born 12 August 1981) is an Algerian footballer who plays as a midfielder for MC Alger.

== Career ==
Born in Sétif, Algeria, Khenniche moved to the Mont-Mesly quarter of Créteil at a young age. He began playing amateur football for US Créteil-Lusitanos and joined the senior squad for three seasons in Ligue 2.

Créteil were relegated to the Championnat National, and in 2009, Khenniche joined Algerian side MC Alger.
