= Yaşın (surname) =

Yaşın is a Turkish-based surname. Notable people with the surname include:

- Neşe Yaşın (born 1959), Cypriot Turkish poet and author
- Özker Yaşın (1932–2011), Turkish Cypriot poet, journalist, and author

== See also ==
- Yasin (name)
