= Yassine Diboun =

American ultra-runner

Personal information
- Born: August 28, 1978 (age 47) California
- Height: 5' 11
- Weight: 150
- Website: http://www.WyeastWolfpack.com/

Sport
- Country: United States
- Event: Ultramarathon
- Team: Columbia/Montrail
- Turned pro: 2007
- Coached by: Self

Yassine Diboun is an American ultra-runner. He won and set the course record at the Leona Divide 50k race in 2013 with a time of 4:03:33. Diboun routinely places near the top in some of the most difficult American and international ultra-marathons, including a 3rd-place finish in the 2016 HURT 100 mile race with a finishing time of 22:39:00 and Top Ten finish in the 2013 Western States 100 with a time of 18:44:02. He ran the 2015 Western States 100 in 17:41:38 and placed fifteenth. His fastest 100-mile time is also at the coveted Western States 100 from 2012 in a time of 16:43:01. In 2015 Yassine was one of five American runners who represented the USA at the IAU World Trail Championships in Annecy, France. The team went on to take the silver medal.

Diboun lives and trains in Portland, Oregon and owns and operates a local training business called Wy'east Wolfpack.
