= Taha, Ghana =

Coordinates: 9°26′N 0°47′W

Taha is a community in Tamale Metropolitan District in the Northern Region of Ghana.

== See also ==
- Suburbs of Tamale (Ghana) metropolis
