= Yasin (name) =

Yasin (Arabic: ياسين, IPA: [jæːˈsiːn]) is a surname and unisex given name of Arabic origin. The name comes from a chapter (surah) of the Quran called Ya-Sin. Variants include Yassin, Yassine, Yaseen, and Yacine.

People with the name include:

== Mononym ==
- Yasin (rapper) also known as Yasin Byn, Swedish hip hop artist

== Given name ==
- Yasin Abu Bakr (born Lennox Philip), leader of the Jamaat al Muslimeen, a Muslim group in Trinidad and Tobago
- Yasin Anwar (born 1951), Pakistani-American banker, former Governor of the State Bank of Pakistan
- Yasin Arafat (born 1987), Bangladeshi cricketer
- Yasin Aslan, Turkish author
- Yasin Avcı (footballer born 1983), Turkish footballer
- Yasin Avcı (footballer born 1984), Turkish footballer
- Yasin Aydın (born 1995), Turkish volleyball player
- Yasiin Bey (born 1973), new name of hip hop artist Mos Def
- Yasin Bhatkal, or Mohammed Ahmed Siddibappa, founder leader of the proscribed terrorist organisation Indian Mujahideen
- Yasin Çakmak (born 1985), Turkish footballer
- Yasin Dutton, Professor of Arabic in School of Languages & Literature at the University of Cape Town
- Yasin Ali Egal (born 1991), Somali footballer
- Yasin Ehliz (born 1992), German ice hockey player
- Yasin Erdal (born 1986), Turkish-Dutch futsal player
- Yasin al-Hashimi (1884–1937), Iraqi politician
- Yasin Hayal (born 1980), Turkish criminal
- Yasin Kaaling (born 2008), Prominent accelerationist LARP:er
- Yasin Karaca (1983), Turkish footballer
- Yasin Osman Kenadid (1919–1988), Somali intellectual, writer and linguist
- Yasin Khosravi (born 1992), Iranian para-athlete
- Yasin Malik (born 1966), Kashmiri separatist leader, advocates the separation of Kashmir from India and Pakistan
- Yasin Haji Mohamoud, Somali politician and Foreign Minister
- Yasin Merchant (born 1966), Indian snooker player
- Yasin Mishaui (born 1975), Bulgarian-Arab footballer
- Yasin Said Numan (born 1948), Yemeni politician
- Yasin Hassan Omar (born 1983), convicted criminal for his role in the attempted 21 July attacks on London's public transport system
- Yasin Özdenak (born 1948), Turkish footballer
- Yasin Öztekin (born 1987), Turkish-German footballer
- Yasin Öztop (born 1991), Turkish footballer
- Yasin Pehlivan (born 1989), Austrian footballer
- Yasin Pilavcılar (born 1990), Turkish jockey
- Yasin Salmani (born 2002), Iranian footballer
- Yasin Sancak (born 1978), Turkish volleyball player
- Yasin Haji Osman Sharmarke, Somali politician and activist
- Yasin Sulaiman (born 1975), Malaysian singer
- Yasin Sülün (born 1977), Turkish footballer and coach
- Yasin Temel (born 1977), Turkish neurosurgeon
- Yasin Wattoo, Pakistani politician and government minister
- Yasin Willis (born 2004), American football player
- Yasin Yılmaz (born 1989), Turkish-German footballer
- Yeasin Ali (born 1961), Bangladeshi politician
- Yeasin Khan (born 1994), Bangladeshi cricketer
- Yeasin Arafat (born 2003), Bangladeshi footballer

== Surname ==
- Abdallah ibn Yasin (died 1059), theologian, founder, and first leader of the Almoravid movement and dynasty
- Ahmed Yassin (died 2004) Hamas Co-founder, Hamas spiritual leader
- Abdul Rahman Yasin (born 1960), 1993 World Trade Center bomber planner
- Ahmed Yusuf Yasin (born 1957), Vice-President of Somaliland, 2002−2010
- Bilal Yasin (born 1970), Pakistani politician and member of the Provincial Assembly of the Punjab
- Deqa Yasin, Somali politician and government minister
- Hassan Sheheryar Yasin, aka HSY, Pakistani fashion designer and television host
- Iman Khatib-Yasin (born 1964), Israeli Arab social worker and politician
- Ismail Yasin (1912−1972), Egyptian actor and comedian
- Khalid Yasin (born 1946), Islamic activist
- Khalid Yasin [Abdul Aziz] (1940−1978), American jazz organist and pianist known as Larry Young
- Lilah Yasin (born 1957), Malaysian politician
- Mian Hamid Yasin, Pakistani politician, member of the National Assembly of Pakistan
- Mo Yasin, Pakistani squash player
- Mohammad Yasin (cricketer) (born 1992), Pakistani cricketer
- Mohammad Yasin (politician) (born 1971), British politician
- Nabeel Yasin (born 1950), Iraqi poet, journalist and political activist
- Naved Yasin (born 1987), Pakistani cricketer
- Nurmemet Yasin (c. 1977-reportedly died 2011), Uighur Chinese author
- Rachmat Yasin (born 1963), or Rahmat Yasin, Indonesian politician
- Rania al Yassin, Queen Rania of Jordan (born 1970), wife of King Abdullah II of Jordan
- Abdurrahman Rock Ya-Sin (born 1996), American football player
- Salim Yasin (1937–2016), Syrian economist and politician
- Shadya Yasin, Somali social activist
- Yazid Yasin, Singapore footballer
- Yevgeny Yasin (1934–2023), Russian economist and politician
- Yusuf Yasin (1888−1962), Syrian-origin Saudi Arabian politician

== See also ==
- Yassin (name)
- Yassine (name)
- Yacine (name)
- Yaşın (surname)
- Taha (name)
