= Réda Babouche =

Algerian footballer (born 1979)

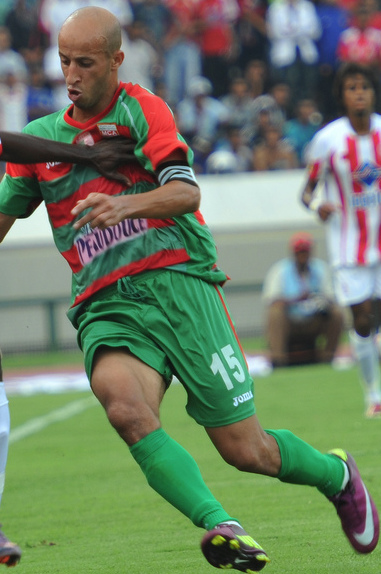
- Babouche with MC Alger in 2011

Personal information
- Full name: Mohamed Réda Babouche
- Date of birth: 3 July 1979 (age 47)
- Place of birth: Skikda, Algeria
- Height: 1.84 m (6 ft 1/2 in)
- Position: Defender

Senior career*
Years	Team	Apps	(Gls)
1999–2004	MO Constantine	-	(-)
2004–2013	MC Alger	188	(16)
2014–2017	CA Batna	82	(2)
2017–2018	CA Bordj Bou Arréridj	2	(0)

International career
2006–2010	Algeria	2	(0)
2008–2010	Algeria A'	4	(0)

Managerial career
- 2018: MC Alger (assistant)
- 2020–2022: MC Alger (assistant)
- 2021: MC Alger (caretaker)
- * Club domestic league appearances and goals

Mohamed Réda Babouche (born 3 July 1979) is an Algerian football manager and former professional player.

== International career ==
On 12 June 2005, Babouche made his debut for the Algerian National Team as a second-half substitute in a 3–0 friendly loss against Mali.

Babouche was a member of Algeria's team at the 2010 Africa Cup of Nations in Angola. He made just one appearance in the competition, starting in the third-place match against Nigeria.

== Manager career ==
In 2018, he was added to Bernard Casoni's coaching staff at MC Alger.

In February 2020, he was hired as assistant manager for Nabil Neghiz's MC Alger.

After Neghiz's dismissal, following 4 matches without a win, he was kept as assistant manager by new coach Abdelkader Amrani.

In April 2021, after Amrani's departure, Babouche was appointed, alongside sporting director Abdellatif Bourayou, as interim coach. After an initial 1-0 loss away to JSM Skikda, the pair recorded two straight victories against CA Bordj Bou Arréridj away and NC Magra at home, after which Neghiz was re-appointed.

Babouche remained assistant manager during Neghiz's brief return. He was once again kept as part of the club's coaching staff after Khaled Ben Yahia's arrival. On 21 May 2022 he received a yellow card for contesting a referee's decision during a 2–0 away defeat against HB Chelghoum Laïd. He was subsequently suspended for one month and fined 100,000 Dinars. The board decided not to renew their trust in both the main coach and his staff, including Babouche, following a 2021–22 season where the club finished 8th.

== Honours ==
- Won the Algerian Cup twice with MC Alger in 2006, 2007
- Won the Algerian Super Cup twice with MC Alger in 2006, 2007
- Won the Algerian Championnat National once with MC Alger 2010
