= Rafan Sidibé =

Malian footballer

Rafan Sidibé (born 12 March 1984) is a Malian former professional footballer who played as a forward.

== Club career ==
Born in Bamako, Sidibé played for JS Centre Salif Keita and Stade Malien in his native Mali before moving to Algeria where he joined MC Alger of the Algerian Championnat National in 2005. On 20 February 2006, while playing for MC Alger in the return leg of the Arab Champions League 2005–06 quarterfinals against ENPPI Club, Sidibé suffered a double fracture of the tibia. He underwent surgery the next day but was sidelined until 10 January 2007, when he came back scoring a goal in a friendly against Fiorentina.

After three years with MC Alger Sidibé signed with league rivals MSP Batna. After one season with MSP Batna, he signed with Olympic Safi in the Moroccan Botola.

== International career ==
Sidibé was part of the Malian 2004 Summer Olympics football team, which exited in the quarter-finals, finishing top of group A, but losing to France in the next round.
