= Mohamed Yassin =

Swedish politician

Member of the Riksdag
- Incumbent
- Assumed office 19 May 2026
- Constituency: Malmö Municipality

Personal details
- Born: 1980 (age 45–46)
- Party: Green Party

Mohamed Yassin (born 1980) is a Swedish politician from the Green Party. He is a Member of Parliament (acting substitute) for the Malmö municipality constituency.

== See also ==
- List of members of the Riksdag, 2022–2026
