= Yacine Kechout =

Algerian footballer (born 1982)

Personal information
- Date of birth: 7 May 1982 (age 44)
- Place of birth: Algiers, Algeria
- Height: 1.82 m (6 ft 0 in)
- Position: Defender

Team information
- Current team: MC Oran

Youth career
- 1997–1998: USM El Harrach
- 1998–2002: MC Alger

Senior career*
| Years | Team | Apps | (Gls) |
| 2002–2003 | MC Alger | ? | (?) |
| 2003–2004 | JS Kabylie | ? | (?) |
| 2004–2005 | MC Alger | ? | (?) |
| 2005–2006 | MO Béjaïa | ? | (?) |
| 2006–2007 | MO Constantine | ? | (?) |
| 2007–2008 | JSM Béjaïa | | |
| 2008–2009 | MO Constantine | | |
| 2011–2012 | MC Mekhadma | | |
| 2012– | MC Oran | 5 | (0) |

International career
| 2000 | Algeria U20 | 2 | (0) |
- * Club domestic league appearances and goals as of 00:00, 27 April 2012 (UTC)

Yacine Kechout (born 7 May 1982) is an Algerian football player who is currently playing as a defender for MC Oran in the Algerian Ligue Professionnelle 1.

== Honours ==
- Won the Algerian Second Division once with MC Alger in 2002
- Won the Algerian League once with JS Kabylie in 2004
