= Fares Djabelkheir =

Algerian footballer (born 1975)

Fares Djabelkheïr
Personal information
- Date of birth: October 12, 1975 (age 51)
- Place of birth: Oran, Algeria
- Height: 1.77 m (5 ft 10 in)
- Position: Forward

Team information
- Current team: CS Constantine
- Number: 29

Senior career*
Years	Team	Apps	(Gls)
1993–1996	US Chaouia	63	(12)
1996–2000	JSM Tébessa	-	(-)
2000–2001	USM Annaba	28	(10)
2001–2002	Stade Tunisien	2	(0)
2002–2003	USM Annaba	19	(3)
2003–2005	MC Alger	49	(10)
2005–2006	CS Constantine	26	(10)
2006–2008	USM Annaba	43	(14)
2008–	CS Constantine	7	(1)

International career^{‡}
2000 – 2001	Algeria	8	(2)
- * Club domestic league appearances and goals as of September 17, 2007 ‡ National team caps and goals as of April 13, 2007

Fares Djabelkheïr (born 12 November 1975) is an Algerian football striker, who plays for CS Constantine.

== Career ==
He made 12 goals in the 2nd division in the 2006/2007 season for USM Annaba.

== International ==
Djabelkheir played for the Algeria national team from 2000 to 2001; he played in eight games and scored two goals.
