= 2005–06 Arab Champions League =

دوري أبطال العرب 2005–06

Tournament details
- Dates: 6 September 2005 – 6 May 2006
- Teams: 32 (from 1 association)

Final positions
- Champions: (Morocco) Raja Casablanca (1st title)
- Runners-up: (Egypt) ENPPI

Tournament statistics
- Top scorer(s): (Kuwait) Khalaf Al-Salamah (Egypt) Magdy Abdel-Aaty (6 goals each)

2005 and 2006 saw the 3rd edition of Arab Champions League. 32 teams represented Arab nations from Africa and Asia.

Raja CA of Morocco won the final against ENPPI of Egypt.

== The System ==
- Round 32: Knock out stage
- Round 16: Knock out stage
- Quarter-Finals: Knock out Stage
- Semifinals and final: Knock out stage

== Round of 32 ==
32 teams play home and away matches as Knock out stage.

Team 1	Agg.	Team 2	1st leg	2nd leg
Al-Zawraa (Iraq)	(a)3–3	(Saudi Arabia) Al-Qadisiya Al Khubar	1–0^{2}	2–3
Al-Merreikh (Sudan)	1–2	(Algeria) MC Algiers	1–0	0–2
CA Bizertin (Tunisia)	3–4	(Egypt) Zamalek SC	2–2	1–2
Al-Wahda Damascus (Syria)	1–2	(Morocco) Raja CA	1–1	0–1
CA Bordj Bou Arreridj (Algeria)	1–4	(Morocco) OC Safi	0–3	1–1
Shabab Al-Ordon Al-Qadisiya (Jordan)	1–2	(Saudi Arabia) Al Nassr FC	1–0	0–2
Shabab Rafah (Palestine)	2–3	(Jordan) Al-Wihdat Amman	0–1	2–2^{4}
Cheminots FC (Djibouti)	1–9 ^{1}	(Bahrain) Al Ahli	0–3	1–6
Al Shabab (Bahrain)	2–7	(Iraq) Al-Talaba	1–3	1–4 ^{3}
Al-Majd Damascus (Syria)	2–11	Al Qadsia Kuwait	0–5	2–6
Al Ittihad Tripoli (Libya)	2–5	(Morocco) Wydad AC	1–2	1–3
Al Kuwait Kaifan	0–1	(Saudi Arabia) Al-Ittihad Jeddah	0–0	0–1
Al-Nejmeh SC (Lebanon)	3–5	(Egypt) ENPPI	0–1	3–4
Al-Oruba (Oman)	0–4	(Tunisia) Club Africain	0–2	0–2
Al Ansar (Lebanon)	0–4	(Egypt) Haras El Hodood	0–1	0–3
ACS Ksar (Mauritania)	0–7	(Sudan) Al-Hilal Club (Omdurman)	0–3	0–4

^{1} Both legs in Manama, Bahrain
^{2} First leg in Damascus, Syria
^{3} Second leg in Damascus, Syria
^{4} Both legs in Amman, Jordan

== Round 16 ==
16 teams play home and away matches as Knock out stage.

Team 1	Agg.	Team 2	1st leg	2nd leg
MC Algiers (Algeria)	6–1	(Iraq) Al-Zawraa	3–0	3–1 ^{1}
Raja CA (Morocco)	3–2	(Egypt) Zamalek SC	0–2	3–0
Al Nassr FC (Saudi Arabia)	2–2 (4–3)	(Morocco) OC Safi	2–0	0–2
Al Ahli (Bahrain)	1–3	(Jordan) Al-Wihdat Amman	0–0	1–3
Al Qadsia Kuwait	3–1	(Iraq) Al-Talaba	1–0	2–1^{2}
Al-Ittihad Jeddah (Saudi Arabia)	2–2 (1–4)	(Morocco) Wydad AC	2–0	0–2
Club Africain (Tunisia)	0–2	(Egypt) ENPPI	0–0	0–2
Al-Hilal Club (Omdurman) (Sudan)	1–0	(Egypt) Haras El Hodood	1–0	0–0

^{1} Second leg in Amman, Jordan
^{2} Second leg in Damascus, Syria

== Quarter-finals ==
8 teams play home and away matches as Knock out stage.

Team 1	Agg.	Team 2	1st leg	2nd leg
MC Algiers (Algeria)	3–4	(Egypt) ENPPI	1–3	2–1
Al Nassr FC (Saudi Arabia)	2–3	(Jordan) Al-Wihdat Amman	1–1	1–2
Al Qadsia Kuwait	1–3	(Morocco) Raja CA	1–0	0–3
Al-Hilal Club (Omdurman) (Sudan)	(a)3–3	(Morocco) Wydad AC	1–0	2–3

== Semi-finals ==
Team 1	Agg.	Team 2	1st leg	2nd leg
Raja CA (Morocco)	8–0	(Sudan) Al-Hilal Omdurman	5–0	3–0 ^{1}
ENPPI (Egypt)	2–1	(Jordan) Al-Wihdat Amman	2–0	0–1

^{1} (Sudan) Al-Hilal were sanctioned with a 3–0 loss after the pitch was invaded and the referee was assaulted by the club's supporters.

== Final ==
Team 1	Agg.	Team 2	1st leg	2nd leg
ENPPI (Egypt)	1–3	(Morocco) Raja CA	1–2	0–1

== Champions ==
Arab Champions League 2005–06
Winners

Raja CA
1st Title

== Prize money ==
Competition stage	Final position	Prize money (US dollars)
Final	Winner	$1,000,000
Final	runner-up	$600,000
