= Karim Braham Chaouch =

Algerian football player (born 1978)

Karim Braham Chaouch (born July 17, 1978, in Algiers, Algeria) is an Algerian former footballer who played as a forward.

== Club career ==
- 1997–1999 IB Khémis El Khechna
- 1999–2001 CR Bordj El Kiffan
- 2001–2001 MC Alger
- 2001–2002 JSM Chéraga
- 2002–2006 MC Alger
- 2006–2008 JSM Béjaïa
- 2008–2008 MSP Batna
- 2009–2009 JS Kabylie
- 2010–2010 NA Hussein Dey
- 2010? MC Oran
