= Mohamed Messaoud =

Algerian footballer (born 1981)

Personal information
- Full name: Mohamed Messaoud
- Date of birth: 19 November 1981 (age 44)
- Place of birth: Tiaret, Algeria
- Height: 1.78 m (5 ft 10 in)
- Positions: Attacking midfielder; forward

Team information
- Current team: RC Boumerdes
- Number: 10

Senior career*
Years	Team	Apps	(Gls)
1999–2003	JSM Tiaret		
2003–2004	MC Oran	12	(3)
2004	→ JSM Tiaret (loan)		
2004–2006	ASO Chlef	37	(16)
2006–2007	CR Belouizdad	19	(8)
2007–2008	USM Annaba	18	(12)
2008–2017	ASO Chlef	203	(72)
2017	MC El Eulma	11	(0)
2017–2018	JSM Tiaret		(0)
2020–	CR Bouguirat		(0)

International career
2010–2012	Algeria A'	12	(0)
- * Club domestic league appearances and goals as of 1 July 2017

Mohamed Messaoud (born 19 November 1981) is an Algerian professional footballer who plays as an attacking midfielder or forward. at the club RC Boumerdes

Messaoud finished twice as the top scorer of the Algerian Ligue Professionnelle 1 in 2008–09 and 2011–12. In 2011, he was a member of the Algeria A' national football team that finished fourth at the 2011 African Nations Championship in Sudan.

== Club career ==
Messaoud was born in Tiaret, Algeria. On 2 November 2012 he reached the 100 goal milestone in the Algerian Ligue Professionnelle 1 with a goal against CA Batna in the ninth round of the 2012–13 Algerian Ligue Professionnelle 1 season.

== International career ==
On 21 May 2009 Messaoud was called up as a reserve player to the Algerian national team for its qualifiers against Egypt and Zambia.

== Honours ==
=== Club ===
ASO Chlef

- Algerian Cup: 2004–05
- Algerian Ligue Professionnelle 1: 2010–11

=== Individual ===
- Two time Top scorer of the Algerian Ligue Professionnelle 1 twice in 2008–09 (19 goals) and 2011–12 (15 goals)
