= Hamid Berguiga =

Algerian footballer (born 1974)

Personal information
- Full name: Hamid Berguiga
- Date of birth: 25 April 1974 (age 52)
- Place of birth: Ouargla, Algeria
- Height: 1.85 m (6 ft 1 in)
- Position: Forward

Team information
- Current team: RC Kouba

Senior career*
Years	Team	Apps	(Gls)
1993–1997	CRM Birkhadem	-	
1997–1998	WRB Saoula	-	(-)
1998–2001	USM El Harrach	-	(-)
2001–2006	JS Kabylie	-	(51)
2006–2007	JSM Béjaïa	-	(9)
2007–2008	RC Kouba	-	(17)
2008–2009	CR Belouizdad	-	(-)
2009	DPMM FC	16	(7)
2010	ES Sétif	13	(2)
2011	Olympique de Médéa	-	(-)
2011–2012	RC Kouba	17	(3)
- * Club domestic league appearances and goals as of 00:00, 5 May 2012 (UTC)

Hamid Berguiga (born 25 April 1974) is a former Algerian footballer.

== Club career ==
On 31 December 2010 Berguiga left ES Sétif. During his time with the club, he made 13 league appearances, scoring 2 goals.

== Honours ==
- Won the CAF Cup twice with JS Kabylie in 2001 and 2002
- Won the Algerian league twice with JS Kabylie in 2004 and 2006
- Won the Singapore League Cup once with Brunei DPMM FC in 2009
- Won the North African Cup Winners Cup once with ES Sétif in 2010
- Top scorer of the Algerian league twice with JS Kabylie in 2004/2005 (18 goals) and 2005/2006 (18 goals)
