= Fayçal Badji =

Algerian footballer (born 1974)

Personal information
- Full name: Fayçal Badji
- Date of birth: 15 February 1974 (age 52)
- Place of birth: Algiers, Algeria
- Height: 1.68 m (5 ft 6 in)
- Position: Midfielder

Senior career*
| Years | Team | Apps | (Gls) |
| 1989–1994 | USM El Harrach | - | (-) |
| 1994–1995 | CS Constantine | - | (-) |
| 1995–1998 | CR Belouizdad | - | (-) |
| 1998–1999 | Erzurumspor | 9 | (1) |
| 1999–2004 | CR Belouizdad | - | (-) |
| 2004–2009 | MC Alger | - | (-) |

International career
| 1996–2000 | Algeria | 11 | (0) |
- * Club domestic league appearances and goals

Fayçal Badji (Arabic: فيصل باجي; born 15 February 1974) is a retired Algerian international football player. He spent the majority of his playing career in Algeria, with a brief spell with Erzurumspor in the Turkish Super Lig. He is currently the general manager of MC Alger.

== Honours ==
=== Club ===
CR Belouizdad

- Algerian Championnat National (2): 1999–00, 2000–01

MC Alger

- Algerian Championnat National (1): 2008–09
- Algerian Cup (2): 2005–06, 2006–07
- Algerian Super Cup (2): 2006, 2007

=== Individual ===
- Chosen twice as the Best Player in the Algerian League in 2000/2001 and 2003/2004 by sports daily Competition
