= Noureddine Daham =

Algerian footballer (born 1977)

Personal information
- Date of birth: 15 November 1977 (age 48)
- Place of birth: Oran, Algeria
- Height: 1.77 m (5 ft 10 in)
- Position: Forward

Senior career*
Years	Team	Apps	(Gls)
1997–2002	ASM Oran	69	(34)
2002–2003	JS Kabylie	2	(0)
2004–2006	MC Alger	60	(27)
2006–2007	1. FC Kaiserslautern	26	(7)
2007–2009	TuS Koblenz	21	(4)
2009–2013	USM Alger	79	(32)
2013–2015	ASO Chlef	52	(11)
2015–2016	USM Bel Abbès	8	(1)
Total		317	(116)

International career
2006–2007	Algeria	11	(2)
- * Club domestic league appearances and goals

Noureddine Daham (born 15 November 1977) is an Algerian former footballer who played as a forward.

== International career ==
Daham made his debut for the Algerian national team in 2006 when he was called up by then head coach Meziane Ighil for a friendly against Burkina Faso. He scored his first goal for the team in the second game, a friendly against Sudan. He has been a regular for the team since his first call-up.

== Club career ==
Daham began his playing career with his hometown team ASM Oran. After five seasons with them, he joined JS Kabylie in the summer of 2002. He was released from the club after an incident in France in which he was accused of stealing from a store. In 2004, he joined MC Alger where he enjoyed his most successful time. He helped them win the Algerian Cup in 2006 with two goals in the final against USM Alger. He is also their all-time top scorer in the Arab Champions League with six goals. In summer of the same year, he joined as a waiver recently relegated 1. FC Kaiserslautern in the 2. Bundesliga. Just three weeks into season 2007–08, the often-injured Daham was transferred to TuS Koblenz.

== Honours ==
MC Alger

- Algerian Cup: 2006

USM Alger

- Algerian Cup: 2012–13
- UAFA Club Cup: 2012–13
