= 2006–07 MC Alger season =

MC Alger
2006–07 season
- President: Omar Ketrandji
- Head coach: François Bracci (until 15 November 2006); Enrico Fabbro (from November 2006)
- Stadium: Stade 5 Juillet 1962
- National 1: 5th
- Algerian Cup: Winner
- Arab Champions League: Round of 16
- CAF Confederation Cup: First round
- Algerian Super Cup: Winner
- Top goalscorer: League: Hadj Bouguèche (10 goals); All: Hadj Bouguèche (15 goals)
Home colours

In the 2006–07 season, MC Alger competed in the National 1 for the 36th season, as well as the Algerian Cup, the Super Cup, the Arab Champions League, and the CAF Confederation Cup. It was their 4th consecutive season in the top flight of Algerian football. After seven years of absence, MC Alger returned to continental participation through the CAF Confederation Cup portal and were surprisingly eliminated in the first round against Kwara United. More than a month after the first leg, the Disciplinary Committee of the Confederation of African Football, ruled to impose a very severe penalty on the MC Alger, namely the suspension of Merouane Abdouni for 3 years, Kamel Bouacida for 18 months for all continental competitions and a fine of 20 thousand dollars. The first, for “physical aggression, violent conduct and threats towards the refereeing body” and the second, for “physical aggression towards the referee”, according to the findings of the said commission.

CAF does not stop there since it informs FIFA of the sanctions imposed on Abdouni and Bouacida with the prospect of possibly extending them to the international and national level. For their part, Réda Babouche, Smaïl Chaoui and Fodil Hadjadj each received two match suspensions for violent conduct and threatening the match referee. And to drive the point home, the president of the football section Khaled Adnane is suspended for six months for having returned to the playing area, despite his expulsion, to threaten the referee and make insulting remarks towards him.

== Squad list ==
Players and squad numbers last updated on 6 August 2006.
Note: Flags indicate national team as has been defined under FIFA eligibility rules. Players may hold more than one non-FIFA nationality.

No.	Name	Nat.	Position	Date of Birth (Age)	Signed from
Goalkeepers
1	(Algeria)	Merouane Abdouni (Note: Merouane Abdouni was suspended from all CAF competitions for three-year. After MC Alger appeal, Abdouni his sentence reduced from three to two years. The ban was subsequently extended by FIFA for national competitions.)	GK	27 March 1981 (aged 25)	(Algeria) USM Alger
30	(Algeria)	Sofiane Azzedine	GK	24 September 1980 (aged 25)	(Algeria) JSM Béjaïa
26	(Algeria)	Mohamed Reda Ouamane	GK	26 June 1983 (aged 23)	(Algeria) MC Oran
Defenders
5	(Algeria)	Smail Chaoui	CB	11 February 1982 (aged 24)	(Algeria) ASO Chlef
15	(Algeria)	Réda Babouche	LB	3 July 1979 (aged 27)	(Algeria) MO Constantine
12	(Mali)	Moussa Coulibaly	RB	19 May 1981 (aged 25)	(Mali) AS Bamako
13	(Burkina Faso)	Harouna Bamogo	CB	10 June 1983 (aged 23)	(Burkina Faso) RC Kadiogo
4	(Algeria)	Kamel Bouacida (Note: Kamel Bouacida was suspended from all CAF competitions for 18 months. After MC Alger appeal, Bouacida his sentence reduced from 18 to 12 months. The ban was subsequently extended by FIFA for national competitions.)	CB	6 August 1976 (aged 30)	(Algeria) USM Annaba
16	(Algeria)	Samir Galloul	CB	18 October 1976 (aged 29)	(Algeria) USM El Harrach
28	(Algeria)	Sofiane Belaïd	CB	5 February 1985 (aged 21)	(Algeria) Reserve team
2	(Algeria)	Larbi Hosni	RB	11 February 1981 (aged 25)	(Algeria) RC Kouba
NA	(Algeria)	Abderahmane Hachoud	RB	2 July 1988 (aged 18)	(Algeria) Reserve team
NA	(Algeria)	Noureddine Kaddour	LB	2 February 1988 (aged 18)	(Algeria) Reserve team
NA	(Algeria)	Salim Baroudi	RB		
Midfielders
10	(Algeria)	Fodil Hadjadj	DM	18 April 1983 (aged 23)	(France) FC Nantes
18	(Algeria)	Farouk Belkaid	DM	14 November 1977 (aged 28)	(Algeria) USM Alger
24	(Algeria)	Lounés Bendahmane	DM	3 April 1977 (aged 29)	(Algeria) USM Annaba
22	(Mali)	Nouhoum Koné	DM	18 September 1982 (aged 23)	(France) ?
6	(Algeria)	Zoubir Zmit	CM	11 June 1975 (aged 31)	(Algeria) USM Blida
21	(Algeria)	Kamel Maouche	LM	17 May 1977 (aged 29)	(Algeria) USM Blida
20	(Algeria)	Slimane Illoul	LM	12 December 1983 (aged 22)	(Algeria) RC Kouba
7	(Algeria)	Ammar Largot	AM	5 February 1980 (aged 26)	(Algeria) SA Mohammadia
NA	(Algeria)	Nassim Bouchema	DM	5 May 1988 (aged 18)	(Algeria) Reserve team
NA	(Algeria)	Hamza Koudri	DM	15 December 1987 (aged 18)	(Algeria) Reserve team
23	(Algeria)	Yacine Hammadou	AM	7 September 1980 (aged 25)	(Algeria) USM Annaba
8	(Algeria)	Faycal Badji	AM	15 February 1973 (aged 33)	(Algeria) CR Belouizdad
Forwards
29	(Algeria)	Sofiane Younes	LW	25 November 1982 (aged 23)	(Algeria) USM El Harrach
19	(Algeria)	Hadj Bouguèche	ST	7 December 1983 (aged 22)	(Algeria) USM Blida
9	(Algeria)	Mohamed Badache	ST	15 October 1976 (aged 29)	(Algeria) USM Blida
17	(Mali)	Rafan Sidibé	ST	12 March 1984 (aged 22)	(Mali) Stade Malien
25	(Algeria)	Abdelmadjid Tahraoui	ST	24 February 1981 (aged 25)	(Algeria) USM Blida
11	(Mali)	Lassana Diarra	ST	29 December 1989 (aged 16)	(Mali) Stade Malien

== Transfers ==
=== In ===
==== Summer ====
Date	Pos	Player	From club	Transfer fee	Source
1 July 2006	CB	(Algeria) Samir Galoul	USM El Harrach	Free transfer	
1 July 2006	MF	(Algeria) Farouk Feghaoui	(France) ?	Free transfer	
1 July 2006	GK	(Algeria) Mohamed Reda Ouamane	MC Oran	Free transfer	
1 July 2006	RB	(Algeria) Larbi Hosni	RC Kouba	Free transfer	
1 July 2006	LM	(Algeria) Slimane Illoul	RC Kouba	Free transfer	
1 July 2006	MF	(Algeria) Lounés Bendahmane	JS Kabylie	Free transfer	
1 July 2006	MF	(Algeria) Farouk Belkaid	USM Alger	Free transfer	
1 July 2006	FW	(Algeria) Abdelmadjid Tahraoui	USM Blida	Free transfer	

==== Winter ====
Date	Pos	Player	From club	Transfer fee	Source
1 January 2007	FW	(Mali) Lassana Diarra	(Mali) Stade Malien	Free transfer	

=== Out ===
==== Summer ====
Date	Pos	Player	To club	Transfer fee	Source
1 July 2006	GK	(Algeria) Makhlouf Aziz	CA Batna	Free transfer	
1 July 2006	FW	(Algeria) Noureddine Daham	(Germany) Kaiserslautern	Free transfer	
1 July 2006	MF	(Algeria) Kamel Maouche	CA Bordj Bou Arréridj	Free transfer	
1 July 2006	FW	(Algeria) Karim Braham Chaouch	JSM Béjaïa	Free transfer	
1 July 2006	GK	(Algeria) Benfissa Lazreg	ASO Chlef	Free transfer	
1 July 2006	DF	(Algeria) Rafik Boudiaf	CS Constantine	Free transfer	

==== Winter ====
Date	Pos	Player	To club	Transfer fee	Source
1 January 2007	DM	(Mali) Nouhoum Koné	ASO Chlef	Loan	
1 January 2007	CB	(Burkina Faso) Harouna Bamogo	WA Tlemcen	Loan	
1 January 2007	MF	(Algeria) Farouk Feghaoui	MO Béjaïa	Free transfer	
1 January 2007	DM	(Algeria) Lounés Bendahmane	OMR El Annasser	Free transfer	

== Pre-season and friendlies ==
10 January 2007 Friendly	MC Alger (Algeria)	1–1	(Italy) ACF Fiorentina	Algiers
:	Sidibé 4'		Reginaldo 90+3'	Stadium: Stade du 5 Juillet; Referee: Daâmi, Saâdallah Chokri (Tunisia)
Note: Lineup for MC Alger - Ouamane (Azzeddine 45’), Hosni (Belaïd, 49’), Baâbouche (Chaoui 75’), Bouacida (Galloul, 47’), Coullibaly, Zemit (Koné 67’), Hadjadj (Illoul 67’), Badji (Largot, 45’), Bouguèche (Tahraoui 75’), Sidibé (Badache 67’), Younès - Coach: Enrico Fabbro

== Competitions ==
=== Overview ===
Competition	Record								Started round	Final position / round	First match	Last match
Competition	G	W	D	L	GF	GA	GD	Win %	Started round	Final position / round	First match	Last match
Division 1	30	8	14	8	34	30	+4	26.67	—N/a	11th	10 August 2006	11 June 2007
Algerian Cup	6	4	2	0	9	2	+7	66.67	Round of 64	Winner	29 January 2007	28 June 2007
Arab Champions League	4	1	2	1	5	5	+0	25.00	Round of 32	Round of 16	9 September 2006	27 November 2006
CAF Confederation Cup	2	1	0	1	3	3	+0	50.00	First round		4 March 2007	18 March 2007
Algerian Super Cup	1	1	0	0	2	1	+1	100.00	Final	Winner	1 November 2006	
Total	43	15	18	10	53	41	+12	34.88				

=== Division 1 ===
==== League table ====
Pos	Team	Pld	W	D	L	GF	GA	GD	Pts	Qualification or relegation
9	USM Blida	30	9	12	9	33	28	+5	39	
10	CR Belouizdad	30	11	6	13	34	37	−3	39	
11	MC Alger	30	8	14	8	34	30	+4	38	2008 CAF Champions League
12	WA Tlemcen	30	10	8	12	24	32	−8	38	
13	OMR El Annasser	29	9	9	11	33	34	−1	36	

Source: DZFOOT.COM
Rules for classification: 1) points; 2) goal difference; 3) number of goals scored.

==== Results summary ====
Overall								Home						Away					
Pld	W	D	L	GF	GA	GD	Pts	W	D	L	GF	GA	GD	W	D	L	GF	GA	GD
30	8	14	8	34	30	+4	38	6	7	2	19	11	+8	2	7	6	15	19	−4

Last updated: 11 June 2007.
Source: Competitive matches

==== Results by round ====
Round	1	2	3	4	5	6	7	8	9	10	11	12	13	14	15	16	17	18	19	20	21	22	23	24	25	26	27	28	29	30
Ground	A	H	A	H	A	H	A	H	A	H	A	H	A	H	A	H	A	H	A	H	A	H	A	H	A	H	A	H	A	H
Result	D	W	L	L	W	D	D	W	L	W	D	D	L	D	W	W	D	D	D	W	L	D	L	L	L	W	D	D	D	D
Position																														

Source: Competitive matches
A = Away; H = Home; W = Win; D = Draw; L = Loss

==== Matches ====
10 August 2006 Round 1	USM Blida	2–2	MC Alger	Blida
	Billal Zouani 23'; Chahloul 33'		Badache 7' (pen.); Younes 87'	Stadium: Mustapha Tchaker Stadium; Referee: Bouali, Talbi, Tahir
Note: Lineup for MC Alger - Abdouni, Chaoui, Baâbouche (Bendahmane 67'), Bouacida (c), Bamogo, Koné, Belkaid, Badji, Younès, Badache (Tahraoui 78'), Bouguèche (Maouche 83') - Coach: François Bracci

21 August 2006 Round 2	MC Alger	1–0	ASO Chlef	Chéraga
	Babouche 74'			Stadium: Stade des Frères Lamali; Attendance: 0 (close doors); Referee: Mansouri, Benaboune, Bechirène
Note: Lineup for MC Alger - Abdouni, Chaoui, Baâbouche, Bouacida (c), Bamogo, Hadjadj, Bendahmane (Koné 89'), Belkaid (Tahraoui 63'), Badji, Younès, Badache - Coach: François Bracci

31 August 2006 Round 4	MC Alger	0–1	JSM Béjaïa	Algiers
			Lahmar 83'	Stadium: Stade du 5 Juillet; Referee: Djaballah, Etchiali, Benmansour
Note: Lineup for MC Alger - Abdouni, Chaoui, Baâbouche, Bouacida (c), Coulibaly, Hadjadj (Belkaïd 62’), Zemit, Badji, Younès, Badache (Tahraoui 70’), Bouguèche (Bendahmane 62’) - Coach: François Bracci

15 September 2006 Round 5	CR Belouizdad	0–2	MC Alger	Algiers
			Bouguèche 27'; Younes 70'	Stadium: Stade du 5 Juillet; Referee: Belahcène, Benarous, Chouih
Note: Lineup for MC Alger - Abdouni, Bamogo, Coulibaly, Bouacida (c), Bendahmane, Belkaïd, Zemit (Koné 78’), Badji (Badache 73’), Bougèche, Younès, Tahraoui (Baâbouche 57’) - Coach: François Bracci

25 September 2006 Round 6	MC Alger	1–1	ASM Oran	Algiers
	Belkaid 64' (pen.)		Senouci 86'	Stadium: Stade du 5 Juillet; Referee: Abid charef, Fedaoui, Helalchi
Note: Lineup for MC Alger - Azzedine, Hosni (Bouguèche 56’), Baâbouche, Coulibaly, Chaoui, Bendahmane, Zemit, Belkaïd, Badji (c) (Badache 73’), Illoul, Tahraoui (Younès 56’) - Coach: François Bracci

29 September 2006 Round 7	USM Alger	2–2	MC Alger	Algiers
	Zidane 8'; Bensaïd 65'		Bouguèche 35'; Coulibaly 62'	Stadium: Stade du 5 Juillet; Referee: Zekrini, Tahir, Belaggoun
Note: Lineup for MC Alger - Abdouni, Chaoui (Hosni 80'), Baâbouche, Bouacida (c), Coulibaly, Belkaïd, Zemit, Badji, Younès, Badache (Hadjadj 74'), Bouguèche - Coach: François Bracci

12 October 2006 Round 8	MC Alger	3–0	CA Batna	Algiers
	Bendahmane 59'; Largot 73'; Younes 81'			Stadium: Stade du 5 Juillet; Referee: Haimoudi, Bouabdellah, Kerraï
Note: Lineup for MC Alger - Abdouni, Hosni, Baâbouche, Coulibaly, Bouacida (c) (Galloul 81'), Belkaïd, Zemit (Largot 68'), Bendahmane, Younès, Bouguèche, Badji (Hadjadj 82') - Coach: François Bracci

19 October 2006 Round 9	WA Tlemcen	1–0	MC Alger	Tlemcen
	Djallit 42'			Stadium: Stade des Frères Zerga; Referee: Boumaïza, Bouziani, Salhi
Note: Lineup for MC Alger - Abdouni, Bamogo, Baâbouche (Largot 30'), Coulibaly, Bouacida (c), Hadjadj (Tahraoui 60'), Zemit, Bendahmane, Belkaïd, Younès, Bouguèche - Coach: François Bracci

9 November 2006 Round 11	Paradou AC	2–2	MC Alger	Boufarik
	Benmoussa 45'; Benachour 71'		Bouguèche 6'; Badji 52'	Stadium: Stade Mohamed-Reggaz; Referee: Belkacem, Deffar Belkheir, Babou
Note: Lineup for MC Alger - Abdouni, Hosni, Baâbouche, Bouacida (c), Coulibaly (Bamogo 45’), Hadjadj (Illoul 76’), Zemit, Belkaïd, Badji, Younès (Largot 85’), Bouguèche - Coach: François Bracci

13 November 2006 (Note: The match was originally to be played on 25 August 2006, but it was postponed.) Round 3	JS Kabylie	1–0	MC Alger	Tizi Ouzou
	Hemani 61'			Stadium: Stade 1er Novembre 1954; Referee: Haimoudi, Kerrai, Omari
Note: Lineup for MC Alger - Abdouni, Hosni (Illoul 78’), Galoul, Bouacida (c), Baâbouche, Hadjadj (Largot 76’), Zemit, Bendahmane, Badji (Badache 83’), Younès, Bouguèche - Coach: François Bracci

4 December 2006 (Note: The match was originally to be played on 26 October 2006, but it was postponed.) Round 10	MC Alger	3–0	CA Bordj Bou Arreridj	Algiers
	Bouguèche 44', 85'; Largot 45'			Stadium: Stade du 5 Juillet; Referee: Fettouha, Haimoudi, Bouanani
Note: Lineup for MC Alger - Abdouni, Hosni, Baâbouche, Bouacida (c) (Coulibaly 35'), Galoul, Belkaïd (Koné 81'), Zemit, Badji, Younès, Largot (Hadjadj 58'), Bouguèche - Coach: Enrico Fabbro

14 December 2006 Round 15	MC Oran	1–2	MC Alger	Oran
	Berradja 33'		Coulibaly 43'; Bouguèche 77'	Stadium: Stade Ahmed Zabana; Referee: Boumaâza, Bouziani, Benbrahim
Note: Lineup for MC Alger - Abdouni, Hosni, Baâbouche, Bouacida (c), Coulibay, Belkaïd, Zemit, Badji (Illoul 65'), Younès (Hadjadj 80'), Tahraoui (Chaoui 46'), Bouguèche - Coach: Enrico Fabbro

18 December 2006 (Note: The match was originally to be played on 30 November 2006, but it was postponed.) Round 13	ES Sétif	2–0	MC Alger	Sétif
	Yekhlef 60'; Adiko 90'			Stadium: Stade 8 Mai 1945; Referee: Benouza, Meknous, Deffar
Note: Lineup for MC Alger - Abdouni, Hosni, Baâbouche (Hadjadj 75'), Bouacida (c), Coulibaly, Chaoui, Bendahmane (Younès 57'), Zemit, Badji (Galoul 29'), Belkaid, Bouguèche - Coach: Enrico Fabbro

21 December 2006 (Note: The match was originally to be played on 23 November 2006, but it was postponed.) Round 12	MC Alger	1–1	OMR El Annasser	Algiers
	Babouche 45' (pen.)		Mellouli 42'	Stadium: Stade du 5 Juillet; Referee: Benaissa, Chnaoua, Aouina
Note: Lineup for MC Alger - Abdouni, Chaoui, Baâbouche, Bouacida (c), Galoul, Hadjadj, Belkaïd (Badji 46'), Illoul (Zemit 75'), Largot, Badache (Tahraoui 64'), Younès - Coach: Enrico Fabbro

25 December 2006 (Note: The match was originally to be played on 7 December 2006, but it was postponed.) Round 14	MC Alger	1–1	NA Hussein Dey	Reghaïa
	Babouche 45'		Chaib Toufik 75'	Stadium: Stade Boualem Bouraâda; Referee: Boukedjar, Debbiche, Rebaï
Note: Lineup for MC Alger - Azzeddine, Hosni, Baâbouche (c), Galoul, Coulibaly, Largot (Badji 45'), Zemit, Iloul, Bouguèche, Younès (Hadjadj 55'), Badache - Coach: Enrico Fabbro

15 January 2007 Round 16	MC Alger	2–1	USM Blida	Algiers
	Younes 23'; Sidibé 54'		Chebira 90'	Stadium: Stade du 5 Juillet; Referee: Boukhdir, Riahi, Zeghal (Tunisia)
Note: Lineup for MC Alger - Azzedine, Hosni (Belaïd Sofiane 71'), Baâbouche, Bouacida (c), Coulibaly, Chaoui (Badji 46') Younès, Zemit, Hadjadj, Bouguèche (Badache 75'), Sidibé - Coach: Enrico Fabbro

18 January 2007 Round 17	ASO Chlef	0–0	MC Alger	Chlef
				Stadium: Stade Mohamed Boumezrag; Referee: Belkacem, Belkheïr, Deffar
Note: Lineup for MC Alger - Abdouni (c), Belaïd Sofiane (Baâbouche 46'), Bouacida, Coulibaly, Galoul, Younès, Zemit, Hadjadj, Illoul (Badache 37'), Badji, Sidibé (Tahraoui 78') - Coach: Enrico Fabbro

22 January 2007 Round 18	MC Alger	0–0	JS Kabylie	Algiers
				Stadium: Stade du 5 Juillet; Referee: Djaballah, Mezroua, Omari
Note: Lineup for MC Alger - Abdouni, Hosni, Baâbouche, Galoul, Coulibaly, Zemit (Chaoui 36'), Largot (Badache 53'), Hadjadj, Badji (c), Sidibé, Bouguèche - Coach: Enrico Fabbro

1 February 2007 Round 19	JSM Béjaïa	1–1	MC Alger	Béjaïa
	Chaouch 90+7'		Younes 56'	Stadium: Stade de l'Unité Maghrébine; Referee: Aouiti, Bitam, Boumaâraf
Note: Lineup for MC Alger - Abdouni, Hosni, Baâbouche, Bouacida (c), Galoul, Hamadou, Younès, Hadjadj, Badji (Largot 46’), Bouguèche (Zemit 73’), Sidibé (Tahraoui 58’) - Coach: Enrico Fabbro

19 February 2007 Round 20	MC Alger	4–3	CR Belouizdad	Algiers
	Badji 2'; Younes 5'; Bouguèche 13'; Sidibé 42'		Amroune 3'; Gana 59' (pen.); Aoudia 64'	Stadium: Stade du 5 Juillet; Referee: Zekrini, Talbi, Belaggoun
Note: Lineup for MC Alger - Abdouni, Galoul, Baâbouche, Bouacida (c), Coulibaly, Hamadou (Zemit 64'), Younès, Hadjadj, Badji (Illoul 73'), Bouguèche (Diarra 88'), Sidibé - Coach: Enrico Fabbro

22 February 2007 Round 21	ASM Oran	2–1	MC Alger	Oran
	Hebbaïche 8'; Rouane 65' (pen.)		Bouguèche 86'	Stadium: Stade Habib Bouakeul
Note: Lineup for MC Alger - Abdouni, Hosni (Largot 67'), Chaoui, Bouacida (c), Coulibaly, Hadjadj, Younès, Hamadou (Zmit 75'), Badji, Bouguèche, Sidibé - Coach: Enrico Fabbro

12 March 2007 Round 23	CA Batna	1–0	MC Alger	Batna
	Amieur 38'			Stadium: Stade 1er Novembre 1954; Referee: Abdellah, Kerrai, Benchala
Note: Lineup for MC Alger - Ouamane, Coulibaly, Baâbouche, Bouacida, Galoul, Younès, Hadjadj, Hamadou, Illoul (Badji 46'), Bouguèche, Sidibé (Tahraoui 70') - Coach: Enrico Fabbro

29 March 2007 Round 24	MC Alger	0–1	WA Tlemcen	Algiers
			Djallit 10'	Stadium: Stade du 5 Juillet; Referee: Khelifi, Sedrati, Bouguerara
Note: Lineup for MC Alger - Ouamane (Azzedine 46'), Hosni, Baâbouche, Bouacida (c), Coulibaly (Diarra 53'), Zemit, Younès, Hadjadj, Badji, Badache (Sidibé 53'), Bouguèche - Coach: Enrico Fabbro

2 April 2007 (Note: The match was originally to be played on 8 March 2007, but it was postponed.) Round 22	MC Alger	0–0	USM Alger	Algiers
				Stadium: Stade du 5 Juillet; Referee: Bichari, Tahir, Talbi
Note: Lineup for MC Alger - Abdouni, Hosni, Baâbouche, Bouacida (c) (Coulibaly 44'), Galoul, Zemit, Younès, Hadjadj (Largot), Badji, Bouguèche (Belkaïd 60'), Sidibé - Coach: Enrico Fabbro

13 April 2007 Round 25	CA Bordj Bou Arreridj	2–1	MC Alger	Bordj Bou Arréridj
	Belayadi 13'; Maouche 40'		Badji 7'	Stadium: Stade 20 Août 1955; Referee: Djaballah, Mezroua, Omari
Note: Lineup for MC Alger - Abdouni, Belaid Sofiane, Hosni, Bouacida, Galoul (Sidibé 69’), Coulibaly, Belkaïd, Zemit (Koudri 73’), Badji (Largot 82’), Younès, Badache - Coach: Enrico Fabbro

27 April 2007 Round 26	MC Alger	1–0	Paradou AC	Kouba
	Coulibaly 85'			Stadium: Mohamed Benhaddad Stadium; Referee: Benamara, Meknous, Deffar
Note: Lineup for MC Alger - Azzeddine, Hosni, Baâbouche, Galoul, Coulibaly, Hadjadj, Younès, Belkaïd, Badji (c) (Largot 58'), Bouguèche (Illoul 88'), Sidibé (Tahraoui 75') - Coach: Enrico Fabbro

10 May 2007 Round 27	OMR El Annasser	1–1	MC Alger	Algiers
	Ali Moussa 54'		Badache 63' (pen.)	Stadium: Stade 20 Août 1955; Referee: Boumâaza, Bouziani, Kadaoui
Note: Lineup for MC Alger - Azzedine, Hosni, Baâbouche, Galoul, Coulibaly, Hadjadj (Zemit 17'), Younès, Belkaïd, Badji (Illoul 87'), Bouguèche, Badache (Tahraoui 76') - Coach: Enrico Fabbro

29 May 2007 Round 28	MC Alger	1–1	ES Sétif	Kouba
	Bouguèche 43'		Maïza 62'	Stadium: Mohamed Benhaddad Stadium; Referee: Slim Jedidi (Tunisia); Assistant referees: Fethi Amin , Réda Fehmi (Tunisia)
Note: Lineup for MC Alger - Azzedine, Hosni, Baâbouche (c), Galoul, Coulibaly, Belkaïd, Hamadou (Zemit 82'), Hadjadj (Illoul 73'), Younès, Badache (Sidibé 77'), Bouguèche - Coach: Enrico Fabbro

8 June 2007 Round 29	NA Hussein Dey	1–1	MC Alger	Hussein Dey
	Halliche 41'		Bouguèche 30'	Stadium: Stade des Frères Zioui; Referee: Amalou, Ibelaiden, Tahir
Note: Lineup for MC Alger - Azzedine, Belaïd Sofiane (Hosni 46’), Baâbouche, Galoul, Chaoui, Hadjadj, Hamadou, Belkaïd, Badji (c) (Hachoud 61’), Bouguèche, Badache (Sidibé 46’) - Coach: Enrico Fabbro

11 June 2007 Round 30	MC Alger	1–1	MC Oran	Kouba
	Tahraoui 74' (pen.)		Haddou 13'	Stadium: Mohamed Benhaddad Stadium; Referee: Aouiti, Bitam, Heboul
Note: Lineup for MC Alger - Ouamane, Belaïd Sofiane (c), Baroudi, Coulibaly (Kaddour 80'), Chaoui, Largot (Bouchema 36', Junior), Zemit, Koudri, Hachoud, Tahraoui, Diarra (Sidibé 76') - Coach: Enrico Fabbro

=== Algerian Cup ===
29 January 2007 Round of 64	MC Alger	3–0	IRB Laghouat	Bou Saâda
:	Babouche 16', 61'; Largot 80'			Stadium: Stade Mokhtar Abdellatif; Referee: Djerbouaâ, Chaoui, Djahnine
Note: Lineup for MC Alger - Abdouni, Belaïd Sofiane, Galoul, Baâbouche, Bouacida (c) (Chaoui 46'), Zemit (Hamadou 57'), Younès, Hadjadj, Badji (Largot 46'), Tahraoui, Sidibé - Coach: Enrico Fabbro

15 February 2007 Round of 32	MC Alger	2–2 (a.e.t.) (4–3 p)	ASM Oran	Chlef
:	Bouacida 30'; Babouche 100' (pen.)		Tigana 82'; Hebaïche 110'	Stadium: Mohamed Boumezrag Stadium; Referee: Haïmoudi, Kerraï, Heddia
Note: Lineup for MC Alger - Abdouni, Chaoui, Bâabouche, Bouacida (c), Coulibaly, Bouguèche (Diarra 80’), Badji (Illoul 109’), Sidibé, Hamadou, Younès, Largot (Tahraoui 55’) - Coach: Enrico Fabbro

19 April 2007 Round of 16	MC Alger	2–0	WR Bentalha	Algiers
:	Bouguèche 35', 46'			Stadium: Stade 20 Août 1955; Referee: Fetouha, Haïmoudi, Bouanani
Note: Lineup for MC Alger - Azzedine, Hosni, Bâabouche (Belaïd Sofiane 59'), Galoul, Coulibaly, Hadjadj, Younès, Belkaïd, Bouguèche, Sidibé (Diarra 82'), Badache (Largot 46') - Coach: Enrico Fabbro

24 May 2007 Quarter-finals	ASO Chlef	0–1	MC Alger	Khemis Miliana
:			Bouguèche 24'	Stadium: Mohamed Belkebir Stadium; Referee: Djaballah, Bouziani, Touil
Note: Lineup for MC Alger - Azzedine, Hosni, Bâabouche (c), Galoul, Coulibaly, Belkaïd, Younès, Hadjadj (Chaoui 86’), Badache (Tahraoui 90’+3’), Sidibé Rafan (Zemit 46’), Bouguèche - Coach: Enrico Fabbro

15 June 2007 Semi-finals	MC Alger	0–0 (a.e.t.) (7–6 p)	USM Blida	Tizi Ouzou
:				Stadium: Stade 1er Novembre 1954; Referee: Khelifi, Talbi, Tahir
Note: Lineup for MC Alger - Azzedine, Belaid Sofiane, Baâbouche, Galoul, Chaoui, Belkaïd, Hamadou (Zemit 45’+2’), Hadjadj, Badji (c) (Illoul 91’), Bouguèche, Badache (Sidibé 84') - Coach: Enrico Fabbro

28 June 2007 Final	MC Alger	1–0	USM Alger	Algiers
17:00	Hadjadj 70'			Stadium: Stade 5 Juillet 1962; Referee: Mohamed Zekrini; Assistant referees: Brahimi Djezzar, Ahmed Sedrati; Fourth official: Touati Djabellah
Note: Lineup for MC Alger - Azzeddine, Hosni, Baâbouche, Galoul, Coulibaly, Belkaid, Hamadou (Zemit 50'), Hadjadj, Bouguèche, Badji (c) (Chaoui 76'), Badache - Coach: Enrico Fabbro

=== Algerian Super Cup ===
1 November 2006	JS Kabylie	1–2	MC Alger	Algiers
16:00	Douicher 55'		Bouguèche 40'; Belkaïd 75'	Stadium: Stade du 5 Juillet; Referee: Ahmed Awda (Egypt); Assistant referees: Djelloul Azzouz (Tunisia), Ferrai Mazari (Algeria)
Note: Lineup for MC Alger - Abdouni, Hosni (Zemit 64’), Baâbouche, Bouacida (c), Coulibaly, Bendahmane, Belkaïd, Badji, Hadjadj (Largot 84’), Bouguèche, Younès - Coach: François Bracci

=== Arab Champions League ===
==== Round of 32 ====
9 September 2006 First leg	Al-Tilal SC (Yemen)	0–0	(Algeria) MC Alger	Aden
: UTC+3		Report		Stadium: 22 May Stadium; Referee: Badreddine Abdelkader (Sudan); Assistant referees: Tarek Fadel Allah, Abdelaziz Kharafallah Toume (Sudan)
Note: Lineup for MC Alger - Abdouni, Feghaoui, Chaoui, Bouacida (c), Coulibaly, Zemit, Younès, Bendahmane (Belkaïd 78'), Badache (Tahraoui 66'), Badji, Bouguèche (Illoul 88') - Coach: François Bracci

19 September 2006 Second leg	MC Alger (Algeria)	2–1 (2–1 agg.)	(Yemen) Al-Tilal SC	Algiers
: UTC+1	Bouguèche 10'; Younes 90+3'	Report	Mohamed Salah 19'	Stadium: Stade du 5 Juillet; Referee: Herzi Ryadh (Tunisia); Assistant referees: Fahmi Rédha, Amina Fathi (Tunisia)
Note: Lineup for MC Alger - Abdouni, Koné (Illoul, 56'), Bamogo, Bouacida (c), Coulibaly, Zemit, Younès, Belkaïd, Tahraoui (Badache 80'), Badji, Bouguèche - Coach: François Bracci

==== Round of 16 ====
21 November 2006 First leg	Al Nassr FC (Saudi Arabia)	2–1	(Algeria) MC Alger	Riyadh
: UTC+2	Al-Meshal 79'; Al-Harthi 87'	Report	Badache 21'	Stadium: Stade du Prince Fayçal; Referee: Abdellah El Hllali (Oman); Assistant referees: Abdellah El Amoudi, Salem Batachi (Oman)
Note: Lineup for MC Alger - Abdouni, Hosni, Baâbouche, Coulibaly, Bouacida (c), Zemit, Bendahmane, Badji (Belkaïd 85'), Younès, Badache (Largot 36'), Bouguèche (Illoul 89') - Coach: Abdelhak Meguelati

27 November 2006 Second leg	MC Alger (Algeria)	2–2 (3–4 agg.)	(Saudi Arabia) Al Nassr FC	Algiers
: UTC+1	Bouacida 27'; Younes 58'	Report	Al-Harthi 7'; Al-Mubarak 69'	Stadium: Stade du 5 Juillet; Referee: Essam Abdel-Fatah (Egypt); Assistant referees: Nacer Hamada, Sobhi Rached (Egypt)
Note: Lineup for MC Alger - Abdouni, Galoul, Coulibaly, Bouacida (c), Zemit, Belkaïd, Badji (Illoul, 64'), Tahraoui (Bendahmane, 75'), Bouguèche, Younès, Hadjadj (Largot, 74’) - Coach: Abdelhak Meguelati

=== CAF Confederation Cup ===
==== First round ====
4 March 2007 First leg	Kwara United (Nigeria)	3–0	(Algeria) MC Alger	Ilorin
15:00 UTC+1	Akombo Ukiyema 6', 40'; Akabuze 87'; Okemir Obunaya (yellow card) 61'		Coulibaly (yellow card) 16' (yellow-red card) 30'; Rafan Sidibé (yellow card) 62'; Babouche (yellow card) 53'; Chaoui (yellow card) 67'; Younes (yellow card) 70'; Badji (yellow card) 86'; Abdouni (red card) 85'	Stadium: Kwara State Stadium; Referee: Noumandiez Doué (Ivory Coast); Assistant referees: Ettiegne Mian, Yeo Songutho (Ivory Coast)
Note: Lineup for MC Alger - Abdouni, Belaïd Sofiane (Galoul Samir 27'), Bouacida (c), Coulibaly, Baâbouche, Younès, Zemit, Hadjadj (Hamadou 63'), Badji, Sidibé, Bouguèche (Chaoui 35') - Coach: Enrico Fabbro

18 March 2007 Second leg	MC Alger (Algeria)	3–0 (3–3 agg.) (5–6 p)	(Nigeria) Kwara United	Kouba
15:00 UTC+1	Zmit 15'; Badache 19'; Bouguèche (yellow card) 61'; Sidibé 77'		Okemiri Ogbona (yellow card) 7'; Amafe Edebiri (yellow card) 15'; Obada Philips (yellow card) 78'; Nikoro (yellow card) 90+3'	Stadium: Mohamed Benhaddad Stadium; Referee: Yousr Saâdallah (Tunisia); Assistant referees: Choukri Saâdallah, Yamen Mellouchi (Tunisia)
Note: Lineup for MC Alger - Ouamane, Belaïd Sofiane, Hamadou (Illoul 60'), Hosni, Galoul, Zemit (Belkaïd 85'), Younès, Badji (c), Badache (Largot 45'), Sidibé, Bouguèche - Coach: Enrico Fabbro

== Squad information ==
=== Playing statistics ===
No.	Pos	Player	Nat	Division 1			Algerian Cup			Super Cup			Confederation Cup			Arab Champions League			Total		
No.	Pos	Player	Nat	App	St	G	App	St	G	App	St	G	App	St	G	App	St	G	App	St	G
Goalkeepers
1	GK	Merouane Abdouni	(Algeria)	20	20	0	2	2	0	1	1	0	1	1	0	4	4	0	28	28	0
26	GK	Mohamed Reda Ouamane	(Algeria)	3	3	0	0	0	0	0	0	0	1	1	0	0	0	0	4	4	0
30	GK	Sofiane Azzedine	(Algeria)	8	7	0	4	4	0	0	0	0	0	0	0	0	0	0	12	11	0
Defenders
12	CB	Moussa Coulibaly	(Mali)	24	22	3	4	4	0	1	1	0	1	1	0	4	4	0	34	32	3
5	CB	Smail Chaoui	(Algeria)	13	11	0	5	3	0	0	0	0	1	0	0	1	1	0	20	15	0
16	CB	Samir Galoul	(Algeria)	17	15	0	5	5	0	0	0	0	2	1	0	1	1	0	25	22	0
4	CB	Kamel Bouacida	(Algeria)	22	22	0	2	2	1	1	1	0	1	1	0	4	4	1	30	30	2
28	CB	Sofiane Belaïd	(Algeria)	5	4	0	3	2	0	0	0	0	2	2	0	0	0	0	10	8	0
2	RB	Larbi Hosni	(Algeria)	20	18	0	3	3	0	1	1	0	1	1	0	1	1	0	26	24	0
NA	RB	Abderahmane Hachoud	(Algeria)	2	1	0	0	0	0	0	0	0	0	0	0	0	0	0	2	1	0
15	LB	Reda Babouche	(Algeria)	27	25	2	6	6	3	1	1	0	1	1	0	1	1	0	36	34	5
NA	LB	Nourredine Kaddour	(Algeria)	1	0	0	0	0	0	0	0	0	0	0	0	0	0	0	1	0	0
NA	RB	Salim Baroudi	(Algeria)	1	1	0	0	0	0	0	0	0	0	0	0	0	0	0	1	1	0
Midfielders
10	DM	Fodil Hadjadj	(Algeria)	25	19	0	5	5	1	1	1	0	1	1	0	1	1	0	33	27	1
18	DM	Farouk Belkaid	(Algeria)	19	17	1	4	4	0	1	1	1	1	0	0	4	2	0	29	24	2
NA	DM	Hamza Koudri	(Algeria)	2	1	0	0	0	0	0	0	0	0	0	0	0	0	0	2	1	0
NA	DM	Nassim Bouchema	(Algeria)	1	0	0	0	0	0	0	0	0	0	0	0	0	0	0	1	0	0
6	CM	Zoubir Zmit	(Algeria)	25	19	0	4	1	0	1	0	0	2	2	0	4	4	0	36	26	0
21	LM	Kamel Maouche	(Algeria)	1	0	0	0	0	0	0	0	0	0	0	0	0	0	0	1	0	0
20	LM	Slimane Illoul	(Algeria)	12	5	0	2	0	0	0	0	0	1	0	0	4	0	0	19	5	0
23	AM	Yacine Hamadou	(Algeria)	6	6	0	4	3	0	0	0	0	2	1	0	0	0	0	12	10	0
7	AM	Ammar Largot	(Algeria)	14	5	2	3	1	1	1	0	0	1	0	0	2	0	0	21	6	3
8	PM	Faycal Badji	(Algeria)	27	23	3	4	4	0	1	1	0	2	2	0	4	4	0	38	34	3
Forwards
29	FW	Sofiane Younes	(Algeria)	27	25	6	4	4	0	1	1	0	2	2	0	4	4	2	38	36	8
9	FW	Mohamed Badache	(Algeria)	17	11	3	4	4	0	0	0	0	1	1	0	3	2	1	25	18	4
17	FW	Rafan Sidibé	(Mali)	14	9	2	5	4	0	0	0	0	2	2	0	0	0	0	21	15	2
25	FW	Abdelmadjid Tahraoui	(Algeria)	14	4	1	3	1	0	0	0	0	0	0	0	3	2	0	20	7	1
11	FW	Lassana Diarra	(Mali)	3	1	0	2	0	0	0	0	0	0	0	0	0	0	0	5	1	0
19	FW	Hadj Bouguèche	(Algeria)	25	24	10	5	5	3	1	1	1	2	2	0	4	4	1	37	36	15
Players transferred out during the season
~~13~~	CB	Harouna Bamogo	(Burkina Faso)	5	4	0	0	0	0	0	0	0	0	0	0	1	1	0	6	5	0
~~22~~	DM	Nouhoum Koné	(Mali)	4	1	0	0	0	0	0	0	0	0	0	0	1	1	0	5	2	0
~~24~~	DM	Lounés Bendahmane	(Algeria)	9	7	1	0	0	0	1	1	0	0	0	0	3	2	0	13	10	1
~~NA~~	DF	Farouk Feghaoui	(Algeria)	0	0	0	0	0	0	0	0	0	0	0	0	1	1	0	1	1	0
Total				30		34	6		9	1		2	2		3	4		5	43		53

Last updated: 11 June 2007

=== Goalscorers ===
Includes all competitive matches.

No.	Nat.	Player	Pos.	D1	AC	SC	C3	C4	TOTAL
	(Algeria)	Hadj Bouguèche	FW	10	3	1	0	1	15
	(Algeria)	Sofiane Younes	FW	6	0	0	0	2	8
	(Algeria)	Reda Babouche	DF	3	3	0	0	0	6
	(Algeria)	Mohamed Badache	FW	2	0	0	1	1	4
	(Mali)	Rafan Sidibé	FW	2	0	0	1	0	3
	(Algeria)	Ammar Largot	MF	2	1	0	0	0	3
	(Mali)	Moussa Coulibaly	DF	3	0	0	0	0	3
	(Algeria)	Faycal Badji	MF	3	0	0	0	0	3
	(Algeria)	Farouk Belkaïd	MF	1	0	1	0	0	2
	(Algeria)	Kamel Bouacida	DF	0	1	0	0	1	2
	(Algeria)	Zoubir Zmit	MF	0	0	0	1	0	1
	(Algeria)	Fodil Hadjadj	MF	0	1	0	0	0	1
	(Algeria)	Lounés Bendahmane	MF	1	0	0	0	0	1
	(Algeria)	Abdelmadjid Tahraoui	FW	1	0	0	0	0	1
Own Goals				0	0	0	0	0	0
Totals				34	9	2	3	5	53
