= 2007–08 MC Alger season =

MC Alger
2007–08 season
- President: Sid ahmed Kercouche (until February 2008)
- Head coach: Enrico Fabbro (until 1 November 2007); Jean Thissen (from 23 November 2007) (until 27 December 2007); Enrico Fabbro (from 28 December 2007) (until 21 February 2008); Mohamed Mekhazni (C) (from 22 February 2008) (until 29 March 2008); Ameur Djamil (from 30 March 2008)
- Stadium: Stade 5 Juillet 1962
- Division 1: 7th
- Algerian Cup: Round of 32
- Confederation Cup: First round
- Super Cup: Winner
- Top goalscorer: League: Sofiane Younes (4 goals); All: Sofiane Younes (6 goals)
Home colours

In the 2007–08 season, MC Alger competed in the National 1 for the 37th season, as well as the Algerian Cup, the Super Cup, and the CAF Confederation Cup. It was their 5th consecutive season in the top flight of Algerian football.

== Squad list ==
Players and squad numbers last updated on 6 August 2006.
Note: Flags indicate national team as has been defined under FIFA eligibility rules. Players may hold more than one non-FIFA nationality.

No.	Name	Nat.	Position	Date of Birth (Age)	Signed from
Goalkeepers
1	(Algeria)	Mohamed Benhamou	GK	17 December 1979 (aged 27)	(France) AS Cannes
30	(Algeria)	Sofiane Azzedine	GK	24 September 1980 (aged 26)	(Algeria) JSM Béjaïa
26	(Algeria)	Mohamed Reda Ouamane	GK	26 June 1983 (aged 24)	(Algeria) MC Oran
Defenders
5	(Algeria)	Smail Chaoui	CB	11 February 1982 (aged 25)	(Algeria) ASO Chlef
15	(Algeria)	Réda Babouche	LB	3 July 1979 (aged 28)	(Algeria) MO Constantine
12	(Mali)	Moussa Coulibaly	RB	19 May 1981 (aged 26)	(Mali) AS Bamako
16	(Algeria)	Samir Galloul	CB	18 October 1976 (aged 30)	(Algeria) USM El Harrach
28	(Algeria)	Sofiane Belaïd	CB	5 February 1985 (aged 22)	(Algeria) Reserve team
2	(Algeria)	Larbi Hosni	RB	11 February 1981 (aged 26)	(Algeria) RC Kouba
36	(Algeria)	Noureddine Kaddour	LB	2 February 1988 (aged 19)	(Algeria) Reserve team
	(Algeria)	Brahim Boudebouda	LB	28 August 1990 (aged 16)	(Algeria) Reserve team
39	(Algeria)	Salim Baroudi	RB		
Midfielders
10	(Algeria)	Fodil Hadjadj	DM	18 April 1983 (aged 24)	(France) FC Nantes
18	(Algeria)	Farouk Belkaid	DM	14 November 1977 (aged 29)	(Algeria) USM Alger
24	(Togo)	Chérif Touré Mamam		13 January 1978 (aged 29)	(United Arab Emirates) Al Jazira Club
35	(Algeria)	Nassim Bouchema	DM	5 May 1988 (aged 19)	(Algeria) Reserve team
23	(Algeria)	Hamza Koudri	DM	15 December 1987 (aged 19)	(Algeria) Reserve team
6	(Algeria)	Zoubir Zmit	CM	11 June 1975 (aged 32)	(Algeria) USM Blida
8	(Algeria)	Faycal Badji	AM	15 February 1973 (aged 34)	(Algeria) CR Belouizdad
21	(Algeria)	Yacine Hammadou	AM	7 September 1980 (aged 26)	(Algeria) USM Annaba
Forwards
29	(Algeria)	Sofiane Younes	LW	25 November 1982 (aged 24)	(Algeria) USM El Harrach
19	(Algeria)	Hadj Bouguèche	ST	7 December 1983 (aged 23)	(Algeria) USM Blida
17	(Mali)	Rafan Sidibé	ST	12 March 1984 (aged 23)	(Mali) Stade Malien
14	(Algeria)	Safi Belghomari	ST	3 February 1979 (aged 28)	(Algeria) US Biskra
25	(Algeria)	Abdelmadjid Tahraoui	ST	24 February 1981 (aged 26)	(Algeria) USM Blida
33	(Algeria)	Abdenour Belkheir	RW	21 February 1989 (aged 18)	(Algeria) Reserve team
9	(Algeria)	Mohamed Badache	ST	15 October 1976 (aged 30)	(Algeria) USM Blida
7	(Algeria)	Abdelmalek Cherrad	ST	14 January 1981 (aged 26)	(France) SC Bastia

== Transfers ==
=== In ===
==== Summer ====
Date	Pos	Player	From club	Transfer fee	Source
1 July 2007	DF	(Algeria) Andy Dahmani	(France) Montceau Bourgogne	Free transfer	
1 July 2007	FW	(Algeria) Abdenour Belkheir	RCG Oran	Free transfer	
1 July 2007	FW	(Algeria) Rédouane Kheloufi	JSM Chéraga	Free transfer	
1 July 2007	DF	(Algeria) Imad Bella	MC El Eulma	Free transfer	
2 July 2007	FW	(Algeria) Safi Belghomari	US Biskra	Free transfer	
6 July 2007	GK	(Algeria) Mohamed Benhamou	(France) AS Cannes	Free transfer	
30 July 2007	FW	(Algeria) Sofiane Mezraoui	(France) US Raon-l'Étape	Free transfer	
13 November 2007	FW	(Algeria) Abdelmalek Cherrad	(France) SC Bastia	Free transfer	

==== Winter ====
Date	Pos	Player	From club	Transfer fee	Source
16 December 2007	MF	(Togo) Chérif Touré Mamam	(United Arab Emirates) Al Jazira Club	Free transfer	

=== Out ===
==== Summer ====
Date	Pos	Player	To club	Transfer fee	Source
1 July 2007	GK	(Algeria) Merouane Abdouni	USM Alger	Free transfer	
1 July 2007	DF	(Algeria) Kamel Bouacida	USM Annaba	Free transfer	
1 July 2007	MF	(Algeria) Slimane Illoul	RC Kouba	Free transfer	
1 July 2007	MF	(Algeria) Ammar Largot	CA Bordj Bou Arréridj	Free transfer	
1 July 2007	DF	(Algeria) Abderahmane Hachoud	CA Bordj Bou Arréridj	Free transfer	
1 July 2007	ST	(Mali) Lassana Diarra	(Mali) ?	Free transfer	
1 July 2007	DF	(Burkina Faso) Harouna Bamogo	(Libya) Khaleej Sirte	Free transfer	
1 July 2007	MF	(Mali) Nouhoum Koné	(Switzerland) FC Baden	Free transfer	

==== Winter ====
Date	Pos	Player	To club	Transfer fee	Source
21 December 2007	FW	(Algeria) Mohamed Badache	ES Sétif	Free transfer	
21 December 2007	MF	(Algeria) Zoubir Zmit	USM Blida	Free transfer	
1 January 2008	DF	(Algeria) Andy Dahmani	(France) Red Star FC	Free transfer	
1 January 2008	FW	(Algeria) Rédouane Kheloufi	JSM Chéraga	Loan	
1 January 2008	FW	(Algeria) Abdelmadjid Tahraoui	OMR El Annasser	Free transfer	
1 January 2008	MF	(Algeria) Yacine Hammadou	USM Annaba	Free transfer	
1 January 2008	FW	(Algeria) Sofiane Mezraoui	CR Belouizdad	Free transfer	

== Pre-season and friendlies ==
6 August 2007 Friendly	San Antonio (Italy)	1–6	(Algeria) MC Alger
:			Badache 20'; Bouguèche 29', 35', 44'; Tahraoui 61' (pen.), 81'
Note: Lineup for MC Alger; First half - Benhamou, Hosni, Baâbouche (c), Chaoui, Galoul, Zemit, Belkaid, Younès, Bouguèche, Badache (Badji 38'), Keister John. Second half - Ouamane (Slimani 63'), Belaid Sofiane, Baroudi, Kaddour, Galoul, Hamadou, Koudri, Mezraoui (Kheloufi 62'), Badji (c), Bouchema, Tahraoui

12 August 2007 Friendly	Scafatese Calcio (Italy)	1–1	(Algeria) MC Alger
:			Tahraoui 70'
Note: Lineup for MC Alger - Benhamou (Azzeddine 46'), Hosni, Chaoui (Belaid Sofiane, 46'), Galoul, Coulibaly (Kaddour, 33'), Zemit (Hamadou, 46'), Younès (Bouguèche, 66' puis Khelloufi, 84'), Belkaïd (Hadjadj, 46'), Tapanguigui (Tahraoui, 46'), Badache (Badji, 46'), Bouguèche (Belkheir, 46')

15 August 2007 Friendly	Al-Nasr SC (United Arab Emirates)	2–0	(Algeria) MC Alger
:
Note: Lineup for MC Alger - Azzedine (Benhamou, 46'), Hosni (Belaid Sofiane, 46'), Baâbouche (Chaoui, 46'), Galoul (Dahmani Andy, 46'), Coulibaly (Kaddour, 80'), Hadjadj (Zemit, 46'), Belkaid (Koudri 60'), Badji (c) (Belkheir, 46'), Younès (Tahraoui, 60'), Badache (Bouchema, 40' puis Mezraoui, 80'), Bouguéche (Belghomari, 70')

4 October 2007 Friendly	JSM Chéraga	0–2	MC Alger	Chéraga
:			Badji 25'; Belkaid 35'	Stadium: Stade des Frères Lamali
Note: Lineup for MC Alger; First half - Ouamane, Hosni, Baâbouche (c), Galoul, Coulibaly, Hamadou, Belkaid, Badji, Hadjadj, Tahraoui, Belghomari. Second half - Benhamou, Belaid Sofiane, Chaoui, Dahmani Andy, Coulibaly, Zemit, Kheloufi, Koudri, Badji (Hadjadj), Mezraoui, Tahraoui.

6 October 2007 Friendly	ESM Koléa	2–3	MC Alger	Koléa
:	Kebachi 5'; Hassan Habib 38' (pen.)		Belkaid 15' (pen.); Belghomari 25', 65'
Note: Lineup for MC Alger; First half - Benhamou, Hosni, Baâbouche (c), Galoul, Dahmani Andy, Hamadou, Belkaid, Hadjadj, Badji, Belghomari, Tahraoui. Second half - Ouamane, Baroudi, Belaid Sofiane, Kaddour, Chaoui, Zemit, Belkaid, Koudri, Mezraoui, Belghomari, Bouchema.

18 October 2007 Friendly	MC Alger	1–3	NA Hussein Dey
:	Younès 33'		Attafen 60', 90+4'; Ouznadji 70'
Note: Lineup for MC Alger; First half - Ouamane, Belaid Sofiane, Baâbouche (c), Coulibaly, Galoul, Hamadou, Belkaid, Younès, Badji, Hadjadj, Belghomari; Second half - Benhamou, Hosni, Chaoui, Dahmani Andy, Galoul, Zemit (Sidibé, 89'), Belkaid (Kheloufi, 76'), Badji (c) (Belkheir, 73'), Hadjadj (Koudri, 56'), Tahraoui (Badache, 81'), Bouguèche (Mezraoui, 87')

== Competitions ==
=== Overview ===
Competition	Record								Started round	Final position / round	First match	Last match
Competition	G	W	D	L	GF	GA	GD	Win %	Started round	Final position / round	First match	Last match
Division 1	30	9	12	9	26	25	+1	30.00	—N/a	7th	23 August 2007	26 May 2008
Algerian Cup	2	1	1	0	6	2	+4	50.00	Round of 64	Round of 32	27 December 2007	21 February 2008
CAF Confederation Cup	2	0	1	1	0	1	−1	0.00	First round		21 March 2008	4 April 2008
Algerian Super Cup	1	1	0	0	4	0	+4	100.00	Final	Winner	1 November 2007	
Total	35	11	14	10	36	28	+8	31.43				

=== Division 1 ===
==== League table ====
Pos	Team	Pld	W	D	L	GF	GA	GD	Pts	Qualification or relegation
5	USM Annaba	30	12	6	12	36	37	−1	42	Qualification for Arab Champions League
6	MC Saïda	30	11	9	10	32	38	−6	42	
7	MC Alger	30	9	12	9	26	25	+1	39	
8	JSM Béjaïa	30	9	12	9	38	40	−2	39	Qualification for Confederation Cup (Note: JSM Béjaïa are Algerian Cup winners.)
9	AS Khroub	30	10	9	11	26	28	−2	39	

Source: DZFoot
Rules for classification: 1) points; 2) head-to-head points; 3) head-to-head goal difference; 4) goal difference; 5) total goals; 6) fairplay ranking; 7) playoff.

==== Results summary ====
Overall								Home						Away					
Pld	W	D	L	GF	GA	GD	Pts	W	D	L	GF	GA	GD	W	D	L	GF	GA	GD
30	9	12	9	26	25	+1	39	6	6	3	14	12	+2	3	6	6	12	13	−1

Last updated: 26 May 2008.
Source: Competitive matches

==== Results by round ====
Round	1	2	3	4	5	6	7	8	9	10	11	12	13	14	15	16	17	18	19	20	21	22	23	24	25	26	27	28	29	30
Ground	A	H	A	H	A	H	A	H	A	H	A	H	A	H	A	H	A	H	A	H	A	H	A	H	A	H	A	H	A	H
Result	W	L	L	W	D	W	W	L	L	D	D	D	L	D	D	D	L	D	D	D	L	W	L	L	D	W	W	W	D	W
Position	2	7	11	8	8	6	5	6	8	9	8	8	10	11	11	11	12	12	12	12	14	12	13	15	15	14	10	8	8	7

Source: Competitive matches
A = Away; H = Home; W = Win; D = Draw; L = Loss

==== Matches ====
23 August 2007 Round 1	USM Blida	2–3	MC Alger	Blida
	Chahloul 26'; Endzanga 82'		Badache 27', 28', 60'	Stadium: Mustapha Tchaker Stadium; Referee: Boukendjar, Debbiche, Chenoua
Note: Lineup for MC Alger - Benhamou, Belaïd Sofiane, Baâbouche, Kaddour (Dahmani Andy, 27’), Chaoui, Belkaïd, Younès, Hamadou (Zemit, 57’), Badache, Badji (c) (Hadjadj, 70’), Bouguèche - Coach: Enrico Fabbro

30 August 2007 Round 2	MC Alger	0–1	ASO Chlef	Rouïba
			Feugang 78'	Stadium: Salem Mabrouki Stadium; Referee: Haimoudi, Kerrai, Omari
Note: Lineup for MC Alger - Benhamou, Hosni (Hamadou 83'), Baâbouche, Galoul, Chaoui, Belkaïd (Hadjadj 58'), Zemit, Badji (c), (Sidibé 65'), Younès, Badache, Bouguèche - Coach: Enrico Fabbro

6 September 2007 Round 3	ES Sétif	1–0	MC Alger	Sétif
	Touil 45'			Stadium: 8 May 1945 Stadium; Referee: Belkacem, Meknous, Belkheir
Note: Lineup for MC Alger - Benhamou, Belaïd Sofiane (Bouguèche 55'), Baâbouche, Coulibaly, Galoul, Chaoui, Belkaïd, Hamadou, Badji (cap) (Bouchema 78'), Younès, Badache - Coach: Enrico Fabbro

13 September 2007 Round 4	MC Alger	3–2	NA Hussein Dey	Algiers
	Younes 11', 76'; Sidibé 61'		Ouznadji 17'; Komara 63'	Stadium: Stade du 5 Juillet; Referee: Mansouri, Etchiali, Ouadah
Note: Lineup for MC Alger - Benhamou, Hosni (Zemit 69'), Baâbouche (c), Coulibaly, Chaoui, Belkaïd, Hamadou (Badji 46'), Hadjadj, Younès, Badache (Sidibé 46'), Bouguèche - Coach: Enrico Fabbro

20 September 2007 Round 5	CR Belouizdad	0–0	MC Alger	Algiers
				Stadium: 20 August 1955 Stadium; Referee: Djaballah, Touil, Mezroua
Note: Lineup for MC Alger - Ouamane, Hosni, Baâbouche (c), Coulibaly, Galoul, Belkaïd (Koudri 77'), Hamadou, Hadjadj (Zemit 46'), Younès, Sidibé (Badache 64'), Bouguèche - Coach: Enrico Fabbro

27 September 2007 Round 6	MC Alger	1–0	AS Khroub	Algiers
	Tahraoui 90+4'			Stadium: Stade du 5 Juillet; Referee: Abed, Haimoudi, Etchiali
Note: Lineup for MC Alger - Ouamane, Chaoui, Baâbouche (Belghomari 61'), Coulibaly, Galoul, Hadjadj, Zemit (Koudri 84', Junior), Badji (cap), Younès, Badache (Tahraoui 36'), Bouguèche - Coach: Enrico Fabbro

19 November 2007 (Note: The match was originally to be played on 18 October 2007, but it was postponed.) Round 7	USM Alger	0–2	MC Alger	Algiers
			Badji 26'; Younes 40'	Stadium: Stade du 5 Juillet; Referee: Bichari, Tahir, Talbi
Note: Lineup for MC Alger - Ouamane, Belaïd Sofiane (Belghormari 82'), Baâbouche, Galoul, Chaoui, Belkaïd, Koudri (Zemit 69'), Hamadou, Badji (c) (Kaddour 65'), Younès, Bouguèche - Coach: Mekhazni Mohamed

25 October 2007 Round 8	MC Alger	0–2	JS Kabylie	Algiers
			Saïbi 1'; Galloul 66' (o.g.)	Stadium: Stade du 5 Juillet; Referee: Mansouri, Omari, Chaâbane
Note: Lineup for MC Alger - Ouamane, Belaïd Sofiane, Baâbouche, Galoul, Coulibaly, Belkaid, Hamadou (Badache 63'), Hadjadj (Koudri 46', Junior), Badji (c), Younès, Belghomari (Tahraoui 63') - Coach: Enrico Fabbro

3 December 2007 Round 9	USM Annaba	1–0	MC Alger	Annaba
	Messaoud 12'			Stadium: 19 May 1956 Stadium; Referee: Abed, Kerrai, Omari
Note: Lineup for MC Alger - Ouamane, Hosni, Chaoui, Galoul, Kaddour, Coulibaly, Koudri, Badji (c) (Sidibé, 77'), Younès (Belghomari, 63'), Badache (Hamadou, 46'), Bouguèche - Coach: Jean Thissen

9 November 2007 Round 10	MC Alger	1–1	MC Saïda	Algiers
	Belghomari 23'		Hamdoune 64'	Stadium: Stade du 5 Juillet; Referee: Boumaza, Feddaoui, Zeghad
Note: Lineup for MC Alger - Ouamane, Hosni, Baâbouche, Kaddour, Galoul, Belkaïd, Koudri, Badji (c), Younès, Belghomari (Sidibé 77’), Bouguèche - Coach: Abdelouahab Zenir

15 November 2007 Round 11	CA Bordj Bou Arréridj	1–1	MC Alger	Bordj Bou Arréridj
	Bellil 12'		Koudri 65'	Stadium: 20 August 1955 Stadium; Referee: Belkacem, Ouadah, Goussas
Note: Lineup for MC Alger - Ouamane, Chaoui, Baâbouche, Galoul, Kaddour, Koudri, Hamadou, Badji (c) (Belkheir Abdenour 65'), Younès (Zemit 87'), Badache (Moumen 90'), Bouguèche - Coach: Mekhazni Mohamed

23 November 2007 Round 12	MC Alger	1–1	OMR El Annasser	Algiers
	Babouche 45+5'		Deghmani 6'	Stadium: Stade du 5 Juillet; Referee: Bousseter, Benarous, Ouchen
Note: Lineup for MC Alger - Ouamane, Hosni, Baâbouche (Badache 81’), Kaddour (Coulibaly 90’+1’), Galoul, Belkaïd (Belghomari 57’), Koudri, Hamadou, Badji (c), Younès, Bouguèche - Coach: Mekhazni Mohamed

7 December 2007 Round 13	MC Oran	1–0	MC Alger	Oran
	Feham 22'			Stadium: Ahmed Zabana Stadium; Referee: Benbaka, Sedrati, Aribi
Note: Lineup for MC Alger - Ouamane, Hosni, Baâbouche, Kaddour, Chaoui, Coulibaly, Koudri, Hamadou (Belghomari 37'), Badji (c) (Badache 63'), Younès (Sidibé 71'), Bouguèche - Coach: Thyssen Jean

13 December 2007 Round 14	MC Alger	0–0	WA Tlemcen	Algiers
				Stadium: Stade du 5 Juillet; Referee: Aouiti, Bitam, Abdouni
Note: Lineup for MC Alger - Benhamou, Hosni, Chaoui, Kaddour (Younès 29’), Galoul, Hadjadj (Daoud Farid 70’), Belkaïd, Badji (c), Baâbouche, Bouchema, Bouguèche (Belkheir Abdenour) - Coach: Thyssen Jean

24 December 2007 Round 15	JSM Béjaïa	2–2	MC Alger	Béjaïa
	Ghazi 3'; Braham Chaouch 34'		Cherrad 50'; Babouche 55' (pen.)	Stadium: Maghrebi Unity Stadium; Referee: Benouza, Djezzar, Guerroudj
Note: Lineup for MC Alger - Benhamou, Hosni, Chaoui (Bouchema 32' puis Bouguèche 82'), Coulibaly, Galoul, Bâabouche, Hadjadj (Koudri 87'), Belkaïd, Badji (c), Younès, Cherrad - Coach: Thyssen Jean

14 January 2008 Round 16	MC Alger	1–1	USM Blida	Algiers
	Cherrad 82'		Behilil 44'	Stadium: Stade du 5 Juillet; Referee: Khelifi, Saâdi, Boucherara
Note: Lineup for MC Alger - Benhamou, Baroudi (Bouchema, 71’), Baâbouche, Galoul, Chaoui, Hadjadj (Belghomari, 58’), Belkaïd, Touré Chérif (Koudri, 54’), Badji (c), Younès, Cherrad - Coach: Enrico Fabbro

18 January 2008 Round 17	ASO Chlef	1–0	MC Alger	Chlef
	Daoud 11'			Stadium: Mohamed Boumezrag Stadium; Referee: Bousseter, Benarous, Ouchen
Note: Lineup for MC Alger - Azzedine, Hosni, Baâbouche (c) (Daoud Farid, 68’), Galoul, Chaoui, Koudri, Younès, Belkaïd, Touré Chérif (Badji, 46’), Belghomari, Cherrad (Bouchema, 87’) - Coach: Enrico Fabbro

25 January 2008 Round 18	MC Alger	1–1	ES Sétif	Algiers
	Belghomari 72'		Hadj Aïssa 55'	Stadium: Stade du 5 Juillet; Referee: Benamara, Mansouri, Graidi
Note: Lineup for MC Alger - Benhamou, Hosni, Baâbouche, Galoul, Chaoui, Hadjadj, Koudri (Daoud, 90'), Badji (c) (Belkheir, 80'), Younès, Belghomari, Touré Chérif (Sidibé, 67') - Coach: Enrico Fabbro

31 January 2008 Round 19	NA Hussein Dey	1–1	MC Alger	Algiers
	Ouznadji 29' (pen.)		Sidibé 82' (pen.)	Stadium: Stade Frères Zioui; Referee: Boumaâza, Bitam, Zeghad
Note: Lineup for MC Alger - Benhamou, Hosni, Baâbouche (Belkheir, 75’), Kaddour, Chaoui, Younès, Belkaïd, Hadjadj, Badji (c) Bouchema (Sidibé, 31’), Cherrad - Coach: Enrico Fabbro

7 February 2008 Round 20	MC Alger	1–1	CR Belouizdad	Rouiba
	Koudri 27'		Aoudia 17' (pen.)	Stadium: Salem Mabrouki Stadium; Referee: Amalou, Tahir, Belagoune
Note: Lineup for MC Alger - Benhamou, Hosni, Baâbouche, Galoul, Chaoui (Touré Chérif, 65'), Koudri (Hadjadj, 56’), Belkaïd, Badji (c), Younès, Cherrad (Sidibé, 38’), Bouguèche - Coach: Enrico Fabbro

14 February 2008 Round 21	AS Khroub	1–0	MC Alger	El Khroub
	Messaoudi 83'			Stadium: Stade Abed Hamdani; Referee: Haimoudi, Bouanani, Bouhassoun
Note: Lineup for MC Alger - Benhamou, Hosni (Belkheir 84’), Chaoui, Galoul, Coulibaly, Koudri, Belkaïd, Badji (c), Younès, Sidibé, Bouguèche - Coach: Enrico Fabbro

25 February 2008 Round 22	MC Alger	1–0	USM Alger	Koléa
	Coulibaly 9'			Stadium: Stade Olympique de Koléa; Referee: Benouza, Tahir, Omari
Note: Lineup for MC Alger - Benhamou, Hosni, Coulibaly, Galoul, Chaoui (Boudebouda, 63’), Koudri, Belkaïd, Hadjadj, Badji (c) (Belghomari, 73’), Younès (Kaddour, 83’), Bouguèche - Coach: Mohamed Mekhazni

6 March 2008 Round 23	JS Kabylie	1–0	MC Alger	Tizi Ouzou
	Bensaïd 33'			Stadium: Stade 1er Novembre; Referee: Benaissa, Djezzar, Kourichi
Note: Lineup for MC Alger - Benhamou, Hosni, Baâbouche, Coulibaly Moussa, Galoul, Kaddour (Bouchema, 75'), Hadjadj, Koudri (Touré Chérif, 43'), Badji (c), Younès (Sidibé, 81'), Cherrad - Coach: Mekhazni Mohamed

13 March 2008 Round 24	MC Alger	0–1	USM Annaba	Koléa
			Hamlaoui 90'	Stadium: Stade Olympique de Koléa; Referee: Haimoudi, Bouanani, Bouhassoun
Note: Lineup for MC Alger - Benhamou, Hosni, Coulibaly, Galoul, Chaoui (Belkheir, 75’), Hadjadj, Belkaïd, Badji (c), Bouchema (Sidibé, 50’), Cherrad (Touré Chérif, 85’), Bouguèche - Coach: Mekhazni Mohamed

31 March 2008 Round 25	MC Saïda	0–0	MC Alger	Saïda
				Stadium: Stade 13 Avril 1958
Note: Lineup for MC Alger - Benhamou, Hosni, Baâbouche (c), Coulibaly, Chaoui, Koudri, Younès, Belkaïd, Sidibé (Belkheir, 56’), Bouguèche (Hadjadj, 75’), Cherrad - Coach: Ameur Djamil

17 April 2008 Round 26	MC Alger	1–0	CA Bordj Bou Arréridj	Bologhine
	Sidibé 71'			Stadium: Stade Omar Hammadi
Note: Lineup for MC Alger - Benhamou, Hosni, Baâbouche, Coulibaly, Chaoui, Koudri, Belkaïd, Hadjadj (Sidibé, 46'), Badji (c), Cherrad (Bouchema, 90'), Bouguèche (Galoul, 80') - Coach: Djamil Ameur

21 April 2008 Round 27	OMR El Annasser	0–2	MC Alger	Algiers
			Babouche 53'; Kabri 61' (o.g.)	Stadium: Stade 20 Août 1955; Referee: Bichari, Haci, Kourichi
Note: Lineup for MC Alger - Benhamou, Chaoui, Baâbouche (c), Coulibaly (Belkheir, 86’), Galoul, Koudri, Hadjadj (Belghomari, 60’), Belkaïd, Bouguèche, Cherrad, Sidibé (Belaïd Sofiane, 71’) - Coach: Djamil Ameur

5 May 2008 Round 28	MC Alger	1–0	MC Oran	Bologhine
	Babouche 25'			Stadium: Stade Omar Hammadi; Referee: Benacer, Hassani, Fahmi
Note: Lineup for MC Alger - Benhamou, Hosni, Baâbouche, Coulibaly, Galoul, Belkaïd, Koudri, Badji (c) (Belghomari, 65’), Younès, Sidibé (Bouchema, 76’ puis Chaoui, 90’), Bouguèche - Coach: Djamil Ameur

12 May 2008 Round 29	WA Tlemcen	1–1	MC Alger	Tlemcen
	Benmoussa 73' (pen.)		Belghomari 42'	Stadium: Colonel Lotfi Stadium; Referee: Boumaâza, Feddaoui, Zeghad
Note: Lineup for MC Alger - Benhamou, Hosni, Baâbouche (Galoul, 42’), Coulibaly, Chaoui, Koudri, Younès, Badji (c), Bouguèche, Sidibé, Belghomari (Bella, 62’) - Coach: Djamil Ameur

26 May 2008 Round 30	MC Alger	2–1	JSM Béjaïa	Bologhine
	Koudri 1'; Younes 45'		Meddour 27'	Stadium: Stade Omar Hammadi; Attendance: 0 (close doors); Referee: Haimoudi, Bouhassoun, Belkheïr
Note: Lineup for MC Alger - Benhamou, Hosni, Baâbouche, Coulibaly, Chaoui, Koudri, Belkaïd, Badji (c) (Belghomari, 68’), Younès, Sidibé (Touré Chérif, 58’), Bouguèche - Coach: Djamil Ameur

=== Algerian Cup ===
27 December 2007 Round of 64	MB Constantine	1–5	MC Alger	Sétif
:	Seghiri 28'		Cherrad 5', 87'; Belghomari 72', 77'; Babouche 83'	Stadium: Stade 8 Mai 1945; Referee: Djarbouaâ, Zid, Chaoui
Note: Lineup for MC Alger - Benhamou, Hosni, Baâbouche, Coulibaly, Galoul, Hadjadj (Koudri 86’), Younès, Touré Chérif, Badji (c) (Belghomari 52’), Bouchema (Bouguèche 68’), Cherrad - Coach: Jean Thissen

21 February 2008 Round of 32	OS Ouenza	1–1 (a.e.t.) (5–6 p)	MC Alger	Constantine
:	Tebib 38'		Badji 10'	Stadium: Ramadane Ben Abdelmalek Stadium; Referee: Benbaka, Sghiri, Zellagui
Note: Lineup for MC Alger - Azzedine, Hosni (Kaddour 45’), Bâabouche, Galoul, Coulibaly, Hadjadj, Belkaïd, Badji (c) (Belkheir Abdenour 45’), Younès, Sidibé (Bouchema 82’), Bouguèche - Coach: Enrico Fabbro

=== Algerian Super Cup ===
1 November 2007	JS Kabylie	0–4	MC Alger	Algiers
14:30		Report	Younès 6', 58'; Belghomari 51'; Badji 54'	Stadium: Stade du 5 Juillet; Referee: Aouaz Trabelsi (Tunisia)
Note: Lineup for MC Alger - Ouamane, Hosni, Baâbouche, Kaddour, Galoul, Belkaid, Koudri (Kheloufi 76'), Badji (c) (Belkheir Abdenour 69’), Belghomari (Sidibé 60'), Bouguèche, Younès - Coach: Enrico Fabbro

=== CAF Confederation Cup ===
==== First round ====
21 March 2008 First leg	MC Alger (Algeria)	0–0	(Egypt) Haras El Hodoud	Koléa
				Stadium: Koléa Olympic Stadium; Referee: Khalid Rouaissi (Morocco); Assistant referees: Abdelaziz El Mehadji, Mohamed Ayoub (Morocco)
Note: Lineup for MC Alger - Benhamou, Hosni, Boudebouda, Galloul, Coulibaly, Koudri, Younès, Belkaïd, Cherrad, Chérif Touré (Bouguèche 58’), Badji (c) (Belkheir Abdenour 71’) - Coach: Mohamed Mekhazni

4 April 2008 Second leg	Haras El Hodoud (Egypt)	1–0 (1–0 agg.)	(Algeria) MC Alger	Alexandria
	Mohamed Al Herda 17'			Stadium: Haras El Hodoud Stadium; Referee: M'hamed Al Zalaoui (Libya); Assistant referees: Ibrahim Ferkach, Fathi Ferrad (Libya)
Note: Lineup for MC Alger - Benhamou, Hosni, Baâbouche, Chaoui, Coulibaly, Belkaid, Younès, Koudri (Touré Chérif 55'), Cherrad, Badji (c), Bouguèche - Coach: Ameur Djamil

== Squad information ==
=== Playing statistics ===
No.	Pos	Player	Nat	Division 1			Algerian Cup			Super Cup			Confederation Cup			Total		
No.	Pos	Player	Nat	App	St	G	App	St	G	App	St	G	App	St	G	App	St	G
Goalkeepers
1	GK	Mohamed Benhamou	(Algeria)	20	20	0	1	1	0	0	0	0	2	2	0	23	23	0
30	GK	Sofiane Azzedine	(Algeria)	1	1	0	1	1	0	0	0	0	0	0	0	2	2	0
26	GK	Mohamed Reda Ouamane	(Algeria)	9	9	0	0	0	0	1	1	0	0	0	0	10	10	0
Defenders
4	DF	Andy Dahmani	(Algeria)	1	0	0	0	0	0	0	0	0	0	0	0	1	0	0
12	DF	Moussa Coulibaly	(Mali)	19	18	1	2	2	0	0	0	0	2	2	0	23	22	1
5	DF	Smail Chaoui	(Algeria)	25	24	0	0	0	0	0	0	0	1	1	0	26	25	0
16	DF	Samir Galloul	(Algeria)	24	22	0	2	2	0	1	1	0	1	1	0	28	26	0
28	DF	Sofiane Belaïd	(Algeria)	5	4	0	0	0	0	0	0	0	0	0	0	5	4	0
	CB	Imad Bella	(Algeria)	1	0	0	0	0	0	0	0	0	0	0	0	1	0	0
2	DF	Larbi Hosni	(Algeria)	22	22	0	2	2	0	1	1	0	2	2	0	27	27	0
39	DF	Salim Baroudi	(Algeria)	1	1	0	0	0	0	0	0	0	0	0	0	1	1	0
15	DF	Reda Babouche	(Algeria)	26	26	3	2	2	1	1	1	0	1	1	0	30	30	4
36	DF	Noureddine Kaddour	(Algeria)	11	9	0	0	0	0	1	1	0	0	0	0	12	10	0
	DF	Brahim Boudebouda	(Algeria)	1	0	0	0	0	0	0	0	0	1	1	0	2	1	0
Midfielders
10	DM	Fodil Hadjadj	(Algeria)	18	14	0	2	2	0	0	0	0	0	0	0	20	16	0
18	DM	Farouk Belkaid	(Algeria)	23	23	0	1	1	0	1	1	0	2	2	0	27	27	0
23	DM	Hamza Koudri	(Algeria)	23	18	3	1	0	0	1	1	0	2	2	0	27	21	3
35	DM	Nassim Bouchema	(Algeria)	10	3	0	2	1	0	0	0	0	0	0	0	12	4	0
	DM	Farid Daoud	(Algeria)	3	0	0	0	0	0	0	0	0	0	0	0	3	0	0
	DM	Bilal Moumen	(Algeria)	1	0	0	0	0	0	0	0	0	0	0	0	1	0	0
24	MF	Chérif Touré Mamam	(Togo)	7	3	0	1	1	0	0	0	0	2	1	0	10	5	0
8	AM	Faycal Badji	(Algeria)	27	25	1	2	2	1	1	1	1	2	2	0	32	30	3
Forwards
33	RW	Abdenour Belkheir	(Algeria)	8	0	0	1	0	0	1	0	0	1	0	0	11	0	0
29	LW	Sofiane Younes	(Algeria)	27	26	4	2	2	0	1	1	2	2	2	0	32	31	6
7	ST	Abdelmalek Cherrad	(Algeria)	10	10	2	1	1	2	0	0	0	2	2	0	13	13	4
17	ST	Rafan Sidibé	(Mali)	18	7	3	1	1	0	1	0	0	0	0	0	20	8	3
14	ST	Safi Belghomari	(Algeria)	15	5	3	1	1	2	1	1	0	0	0	0	17	7	5
19	ST	Hadj Bouguèche	(Algeria)	24	22	1	2	1	0	1	1	0	2	1	0	29	25	1
Players transferred out during the season
~~21~~	MF	Yacine Hammadou	(Algeria)	11	9	0	0	0	0	0	0	0	0	0	0	11	9	0
~~6~~	MF	Zoubir Zmit	(Algeria)	7	2	0	0	0	0	0	0	0	0	0	0	7	2	0
~~9~~	FW	Mohamed Badache	(Algeria)	11	7	3	0	0	0	0	0	0	0	0	0	11	7	3
~~25~~	FW	Abdelmadjid Tahraoui	(Algeria)	2	0	1	0	0	0	0	0	0	0	0	0	2	0	1
Total				30		26	2		6	1		4	2		0	35		36

Last updated: 11 June 2008

=== Goalscorers ===
Includes all competitive matches.

No.	Nat.	Player	Pos.	D1	AC	SC	C3	TOTAL
29	(Algeria)	Sofiane Younes	LW	4	0	2	0	6
14	(Algeria)	Safi Belghomari	ST	3	2	0	0	5
7	(Algeria)	Abdelmalek Cherrad	ST	2	2	0	0	4
15	(Algeria)	Reda Babouche	DF	3	1	0	0	4
8	(Algeria)	Faycal Badji	MF	1	1	1	0	3
23	(Algeria)	Hamza Koudri	MF	3	0	0	0	3
17	(Mali)	Rafan Sidibé	ST	3	0	0	0	3
9	(Algeria)	Mohamed Badache	ST	3	0	0	0	3
19	(Algeria)	Hadj Bouguèche	ST	1	0	0	0	1
25	(Algeria)	Abdelmadjid Tahraoui	FW	1	0	0	0	1
12	(Mali)	Moussa Coulibaly	DF	1	0	0	0	1
Own Goals				0	0	0	0	0
Totals				26	6	4	0	36
