= 2007 Algerian Cup final =

- Stade du 5 Juillet hosted the match
- Event: 2006–07 Algerian Cup
MC Alger	USM Alger
1	0
- Date: June 28, 2007
- Venue: Stade 5 Juillet 1962, Algiers
- Referee: Mohamed Zekrini
- Attendance: 80.000

The 2007 Algerian Cup final was the 43rd final of the Algerian Cup. The final took place on June 28, 2007, at Stade 5 Juillet 1962 in Algiers with kick-off at 17:00. MC Alger beat USM Alger 1–0 to win their sixth Algerian Cup.

Algerian Ligue Professionnelle 1 clubs MC Alger and USM Alger will contest the final, in what will be the 78th edition of the Algiers Derby. The competition winners are awarded a berth in the 2008 CAF Confederation Cup.

== Pre-match ==
=== Details ===
June 28, 2007
17:00

MC Alger	1–0	USM Alger
Fodil Hadjadj 70'	Report (in French)

Stade 5 Juillet 1962, Algiers
Attendance: 80.000
Referee: Mohamed Zekrini, Brahimi Djezzar, Ahmed Sedrati, Touati Djabellah

MC Alger	USM Alger

30	(Algeria) Sofiane Azzedine
15	(Algeria) Réda Babouche
12	(Mali) Moussa Coulibaly		(red card) 90+4'
16	(Algeria) Samir Galoul
2	(Algeria) Larbi Hosni		(yellow card) 2'
18	(Algeria) Farouk Belkaïd		(yellow card) 89'
10	(Algeria) Fodil Hadjadj
23	(Algeria) Yacine Hamadou	(substituted off) 53'
8	(Algeria) Fayçal Badji (c)	(substituted off) 77'	(yellow card) 76'
9	(Algeria) Mohamed Badache
19	(Algeria) Hadj Bouguèche
Substitutes :
6	(Algeria) Zoubir Zemit	(substituted in) 53'
5	(Algeria) Smaïl Chaoui	(substituted in) 77'
26	(Algeria) Mohamed Reda Ouahmane
28	(Algeria) Sofiane Belaïd
20	(Algeria) Slimane Illoul
17	(Mali) Rafan Sidibé
7	(Algeria) Ammar Largot
29	(Algeria) Sofiane Younes
Manager :
(Italy) Enrico Fabbro

1	(Algeria) Lamine Zemmamouche
29	(Algeria) Abdelkader Besseghir
3	(Algeria) Mohamed Amine Zidane	(substituted off) 67'
2	(Algeria) Mohamed Hamdoud (c)	(substituted off) 79'
6	(Algeria) Farid Djahnine
28	(Algeria) Karim Ghazi
4	(Algeria) Salim Aribi
15	(Algeria) Antar Boucherit	(substituted off) 77'
7	(Algeria) Amar Ammour
9	(Mali) Mintou Doucoure		(yellow card) 93'
19	(Mali) Sédonoudé Abouta
Substitutes :
26	(Algeria) Hocine Metref	(substituted in) 67'
22	(Algeria) Mohamed Boussefiane	(substituted in) 77'
10	(Algeria) Sofiane Hanitser	(substituted in) 79'	(red card) 90+4'
24	(Algeria) Farid Belmellat
5	(Algeria) Mounir Zeghdoud
23	(Algeria) Tayeb Guessoum
31	(Algeria) Zineddine Mekkaoui
Manager :
(Algeria) Rachid Belhout

MATCH OFFICIALS

- Assistant referees:
  - Brahimi Djezzar
  - Ahmed Sedrati
- Fourth official:
  - Touati Djabellah

MAN OF THE MATCH

- (Algeria) Fodil Hadjadj (MC Alger)

MATCH RULES

- 90 minutes.
- 30 minutes of extra-time if necessary.
- Penalty shootout if scores still level.
- Seven named substitutes.
- Maximum of three substitutions.
