= 2009–10 MC Alger season =

MC Alger
2009–10 season
- President: Sadek Amrous
- Head coach: Alain Michel (until November 2009); François Bracci (from 29 November 2009)
- Stadium: Stade 5 Juillet 1962
- National 1: 1st
- Algerian Cup: Quarter-finals
- Top goalscorer: League: Hadj Bouguèche (17 goals); All: Hadj Bouguèche (17 goal)
Home colours

In the 2009–10 season, MC Alger competed in the National 1 for the 39th season, as well as the Algerian Cup. It was their 7th consecutive season in the top flight of Algerian football. The general assembly of MC Alger, held on May 25, 2010 at the club's headquarters, gave its approval for the transition to professionalism and the creation of an SARL "Le Doyen". The 50 members present, including 38 by proxy out of the 73 that make up the AG, voted unanimously to first transition the MCA from an amateur club to a professional club, then the choice of the type of commercial company, namely the SSPA (sports company by shares) called "Le Doyen Mouloudia Club d'Alger". The assembly was chaired by Bouhraoua with at his side President Sadek Amrous and the auditor of the MC Alger. The decision was taken during the general assembly of the Club held on May 25, 2010 and officially took effect on August 5, 2010.

== Squad list ==
Players and squad numbers last updated on 6 August 2009.
Note: Flags indicate national team as has been defined under FIFA eligibility rules. Players may hold more than one non-FIFA nationality.

No.	Nat.	Name	Position	Date of Birth (Age)	Signed from
Goalkeepers
1	(Algeria)	Mohamed Lamine Zemmamouche	GK	19 March 1985 (aged 24)	(Algeria) USM Alger
26	(Algeria)	Mohamed Reda Ouamane	GK	26 June 1983 (aged 26)	(Algeria) MC Oran
	(Algeria)	Bilel Slimani	GK	28 April 1989 (aged 20)	(Algeria) Reserve team
Defenders
12	(Mali)	Moussa Coulibaly	RB	19 May 1981 (aged 28)	(Mali) AS Real Bamako
25	(Algeria)	Hamza Zeddam	CB	8 April 1984 (aged 25)	(Algeria) ES Sétif
5	(Algeria)	Sid Ahmed Khedis	CB	22 August 1985 (aged 23)	(Algeria) NA Hussein Dey
	(Algeria)	Sofiane Harkat	CB	26 January 1984 (aged 25)	(Algeria) USM Alger
6	(Algeria)	Mohamed Megharbi	CB	6 May 1984 (aged 25)	(Algeria) ASM Oran
24	(Algeria)	Mohamed Aberrane		6 June 1989 (aged 20)	(Algeria) Reserve team
11	(Algeria)	Abdelkader Besseghir	RB	5 March 1978 (aged 31)	(Algeria) RC Kouba
	(Algeria)	Ibrahim Essaïd	RB	11 July 1989 (aged 20)	(Algeria) Reserve team
22	(Algeria)	Benziane Senouci	RB	5 October 1981 (aged 27)	(Algeria) USM Blida
15	(Algeria)	Reda Babouche	LB	3 July 1979 (aged 30)	(Algeria) MO Constantine
4	(Algeria)	Brahim Boudebouda	LB	28 August 1990 (aged 18)	(Algeria) Reserve team
Midfielders
10	(Algeria)	Fodil Hadjadj	DM	18 April 1983 (aged 26)	(France) FC Nantes
23	(Algeria)	Hamza Koudri	DM	15 December 1987 (aged 21)	(Algeria) Reserve team
13	(Algeria)	Nassim Bouchema	DM	5 May 1988 (aged 21)	(Algeria) Reserve team
18	(Algeria)	Farid Daoud	DM	25 August 1989 (aged 19)	(Algeria) Reserve team
27	(Algeria)	Bilal Moumen	DM	16 February 1990 (aged 19)	(Algeria) Reserve team
14	(Algeria)	Salim Ryad Kabla		19 November 1989 (aged 19)	(Algeria) ?
7	(Algeria)	Abdelmalek Mokdad	AM	5 May 1986 (aged 23)	(France) US Créteil
8	(Algeria)	Billel Attafen	AM	3 July 1985 (aged 24)	(Algeria) NA Hussein Dey
20	(Algeria)	Salim Boumechra	AM	28 April 1983 (aged 26)	(Algeria) ASM Oran
Forwards
	(Algeria)	Zinedine Bensalem	RW	25 May 1990 (aged 19)	(Algeria) Reserve team
16	(Algeria)	Abdenour Belkheir	RW	21 February 1989 (aged 20)	(Algeria) Reserve team
19	(Algeria)	Hadj Bouguèche	ST	7 December 1983 (aged 25)	(Algeria) USM Blida
9	(Algeria)	Mohamed Derrag	ST	3 April 1985 (aged 24)	(Algeria) JS Kabylie
29	(Algeria)	Mohamed Amroune	ST	10 March 1989 (aged 20)	(Algeria) Reserve team
21	(Algeria)	Mohamed Issam Hamrat	RW	30 August 1987 (aged 21)	(Algeria) Reserve team

== Transfers ==
=== In ===
Date	Pos	Player	From club	Transfer fee	Source
1 June 2009	RB	(Algeria) Benziane Senouci	USM Blida	Undisclosed	
3 June 2009	AM	(Algeria) Billel Attafen	NA Hussein Dey	Undisclosed	
8 June 2009	CB	(Algeria) Sid Ahmed Khedis	NA Hussein Dey	Undisclosed	
13 June 2009	GK	(Algeria) Mohamed Lamine Zemmamouche	USM Alger	Undisclosed	
1 July 2009	RW	(Algeria) Mohamed Issam Hamrat	NR Bou Ismail	Undisclosed	
1 July 2009	ST	(Algeria) Mohamed Derrag	JS Kabylie	Undisclosed	
1 July 2009	AM	(Algeria) Abdelmalek Mokdad	(France) US Créteil	Undisclosed	
1 July 2009	ST	(Algeria) Madjid Bouabdellah	(France) US Créteil	Undisclosed	
1 January 2010	DF	(Algeria) Sofiane Harkat	USM Alger	Undisclosed	

=== Out ===
Date	Pos	Player	To club	Transfer fee	Source
1 July 2009	GK	(Algeria) Mohamed Benhamou	MC Oran	Undisclosed	
1 July 2009	GK	(Algeria) Azzedine Doukha	USM El Harrach	Undisclosed	
1 July 2009	AM	(Algeria) Faycal Badji	Retired	—N/a	
1 July 2009	MF	(Algeria) Yacine Hammadou	ASO Chlef	Undisclosed	
1 July 2009	ST	(Algeria) Hamza Yacef	MSP Batna	Undisclosed	
1 July 2009	LW	(Algeria) Sofiane Younes	CR Belouizdad	Undisclosed	
1 July 2009	CB	(Algeria) Smail Chaoui	MC Saida	Undisclosed	
1 July 2009	DF	(Algeria) Mamaar Bentoucha	MC Saida	Undisclosed	
1 July 2009	ST	(Tunisia) Chakib Lachkham	(Libya) Annajma SC	Undisclosed	
1 July 2009	ST	(Ivory Coast) Jean-Marc Benie	(Thailand) Chonburi	Undisclosed	
1 July 2009	ST	(Algeria) Sofiane Bencharif	ES Sétif	Undisclosed	
1 July 2009	FW	(Algeria) Mohamed Boudjenah	MC Oran	Undisclosed	

== Pre-season and friendlies ==
19 July 2009 Friendly	Hutnik Kraków (Poland)	2–2	(Algeria) MC Alger	, Poland
		Report	Besseghier 4'; Derrag 26'
Note: Lineup for MC Alger; First half - Zemmamouche, Besseghir (Senouci), Bedbouda, Zeddam, Coulibaly, Bouchama, Mokdad, Daoud, Amroun, Attafen, Derrag; Second half - Slimani, Senouci, Babouche, Essaïd, Khedis, Moumen, Bensalem (Bouchama), Abirane (Bensalem), Hamrat, Bouguèche, Belkheïr

25 July 2009 Friendly	MC Alger (Algeria)	3–0	(Hungary) Vác FC	, Poland
	? 18' (o.g.); Baâbouche 50' (pen.); Boumechra 77'	Report
Note: Lineup for MC Alger; First half - Zemmamouche, Senouci, Bedbouda, Zeddam, Coulibaly, Bouchama, Derrag, Koudri, Amroune, Mokdad, Babouche; Second half - Zemmamouche, Senouci (Moumen), Babouche, Khedis, Coulibaly, Bouchama (Derrag), Daoud, Boumechra, Amroune (Belkheir), Mokdad (Attafen), Bouguèche

26 July 2009 Friendly	LKS Bestwina (Algeria)	0–9	(Poland) MC Alger	, Poland
	Belkheir (?), (?); Hamrat (?), (?); Boumechra 50', 53', 71', 87'; Koudri 65'	Report
Note: Lineup for MC Alger; First half - Ouamane, Moumen, Daoud Farid, Khedis, Essaid, Kabla, Aberrane, Bensalem, Khenniche, Hamrat, Belkheir Abdenour. Second half - Slimani, Moumen (Bensalem), Boudebouda, Zeddam, Essaid, Koudri, Daoud Farid (Aberrane), Kabla, Attafen, Boumechra, Bouguèche.

29 July 2009 Friendly	KLS Bielsko Biala (Poland)	1–7	(Algeria) MC Alger	, Poland
	? 47'	Report	Derrag 17'; Baâbouche 41' (pen.); Boumechra 47'; Amroune 49'; Bouguèche 80'; Belkheir 83'; Hamrat 88'
Note: Lineup for MC Alger - Zemmamouche (Ouamane 46'), Senouci (Essaïd 68'), Bedbouda (Hamrat 71'), Coulibaly (Kabla 76'), Khedis (Zeddam 46'), Bouchama (Moumen 68'), Mokdad (Attafen 62'), Derrag (Bouguèche 46'), Boumechra (Belkheir 62'), Babouche, Bouabdallah (Amroune 46').

== Competitions ==
=== Overview ===
Competition	Record								Started round	Final position / round	First match	Last match
Competition	G	W	D	L	GF	GA	GD	Win %	Started round	Final position / round	First match	Last match
National 1	34	18	12	4	50	23	+27	52.94	—N/a	Winners	6 August 2009	31 May 2010
Algerian Cup	4	3	0	1	9	3	+6	75.00	Round of 64	Quarter-final	25 December 2009	9 April 2010
Total	38	21	12	5	59	26	+33	55.26				

Updated to match played 9 May 2017
Source: Competitions

== League table ==
Pos	Team	Pld	W	D	L	GF	GA	GD	Pts	Qualification or relegation
1	MC Alger (C, Q)	34	18	12	4	50	23	+27	66	2011 CAF Champions League
2	ES Sétif (Q)	34	17	12	5	51	32	+19	63	2011 CAF Champions League
3	JS Kabylie (Q)	34	15	9	10	39	27	+12	54	2011 CAF Confederation Cup
4	USM Alger	34	14	11	9	47	33	+14	53	
5	USM El Harrach	34	13	13	8	46	33	+13	52	

Source: Soccerways FIFA.com
Rules for classification: 1) points; 2) goal difference; 3) number of goals scored.
(C) Champions; (Q) Qualified for the phase indicated

=== Results summary ===
Overall								Home						Away					
Pld	W	D	L	GF	GA	GD	Pts	W	D	L	GF	GA	GD	W	D	L	GF	GA	GD
34	18	12	4	51	24	+27	66	13	4	0	35	10	+25	5	8	4	16	14	+2

Last updated: 29 December 2014.
Source: Competitive matches

=== Results by round ===
Round	1	2	3	4	5	6	7	8	9	10	11	12	13	14	15	16	17	18	19	20	21	22	23	24	25	26	27	28	29	30	31	32	33	34
Ground	H	A	H	A	H	A	H	A	H	H	A	H	A	H	A	H	A	A	H	A	H	A	H	A	H	A	A	H	A	H	A	H	A	H
Result	W	L	W	W	W	W	W	W	D	D	L	W	D	D	D	W	D	L	W	D	W	D	W	D	W	W	W	W	D	D	L	W	D	W
Position	1	5	2	1	1	1	1	1	1	1	1	1	1	1	1	1	1	1	1	1	1	1	1	1	1	1	1	1	1	1	2	1	1	1

Source: Competitive matches
A = Away; H = Home; W = Win; D = Draw; L = Loss

=== Matches ===
Win Draw Loss

6 August 2009 Round 1	MC Alger	4–0	USM Annaba	Bologhine
17:00	Boudebouda 35'; Bouguèche 38'; Amroune 49', 60'	Soccerway report		Stadium: Omar Hamadi Stadium; Referee: Farouk Mial
Note: Lineup for MC Alger - Zemmamouche, Moumen, Boudebouda, Zeddam, Coulibaly, Baâbouche (cap) (Attafen 85'), Bouchema, Bouguèche (Khedis 69'), Boumechra, Amroune (Hamrat 79'), Derrag - Coach: Alain Michel

14 August 2009 Round 2	CA Bordj Bou Arreridj	1–0 (Note: Match stopped at 72', fight between supporters and invasion of the pitch. LNF decision match lost for both teams, 6 matches behind closed doors for CA Bordj Bou Arreridj and 2 for MC Alger.)	MC Alger	Bordj Bou Arréridj
19:00	Khames 2'	Soccerway report		Stadium: Stade 20 Août 1955; Referee: Belkacem Boumaza
Note: Lineup for MC Alger - Zemmamouche, Senouci, Boudebouda, Coulibaly, Baâbouche (c), Zeddam, Moumen, Boumechra, Bouguèche, Derrag, Amroune - Coach: Alain Michel

22 August 2009 Round 3	MC Alger	1–0	USM Blida	Rouiba
22:00	Babouche 26' (pen.)	Soccerway report		Stadium: Stade Mabrouki Salem; Attendance: 0 (close doors); Referee: Mohamed Bouali
Note: Lineup for MC Alger - Zemamouche, Senouci, Boudebouda, Coulibaly, Zeddam, Koudri, Baâbouche (cap), Bouguèche (Hamrat 90’+2’), Amroune, Boumechra, Derrag (Moumen 80’) - Coach: Alain Michel

28 August 2009 Round 4	ASO Chlef	0–2	MC Alger	Chlef
22:00		Soccerway report	Amroune 14'; Bouguèche 44'	Stadium: Stade Mohamed Boumezrag; Referee: Farouk Houasnia
Note: Lineup for MC Alger - Zemmamouche, Besseghier, Baâbouche (c), Zeddam, Coulibaly, Koudri, Bouchema, Boumechra (Attafen 66'), Derrag (Moumen 75'), Bouguèche, Amroune - Coach: Alain Michel

11 September 2009 Round 5	MC Alger	1–0	JS Kabylie	Algiers
22:00	Bouguèche 71'	Soccerway report		Stadium: Stade 5 Juillet 1962; Attendance: 0 (close doors); Referee: Mokhtar Amalou
Note: Lineup for MC Alger - Zemmamouche, Besseghier, Baâbouche (c), Coulibaly Moussa, Zeddam, Koudri, Bouchema, Attafen (Belkheir Abdenour 92’), Bouguèche (Boumechra 89’), Derrag (Moumen 80’), Amroune - Coach: Alain Michel

19 September 2009 Round 6	NA Hussein Dey	0–1	MC Alger	Algiers
23:00		Soccerway report	Derrag 13'	Stadium: Stade 5 Juillet 1962; Referee: Redouane Necib
Note: Lineup for MC Alger - Zemmamouche, Besseghier, Baâbouche (c), Coulibaly, Zeddam, Koudri, Bouchema, Attafen (Moumen Bilal), Derrag (Khedis), Bouguèche (Boumechra), Amroune - Coach: Alain Michel

2 October 2009 Round 8	CA Batna	1–2	MC Alger	Batna
20:00	Bourahli 80'	Soccerway report	Bouguèche 34'; Babouche 89' (pen.)	Stadium: Stade 1er Novembre 1954; Referee: Okba Benbaka
Note: Lineup for MC Alger - Zemmamouche, Senouci, Baâbouche (c), Zeddam, Coulibaly, Koudri, Bouchema, Attafen (Moumen 77’), Derrag (Khedis 91’), Bouguèche, Hamrat (Boumechra 70’) - Coach: Alain Michel

16 October 2009 Round 9	MC Alger	0–0	USM Alger	Algiers
20:00		Soccerway report		Stadium: Stade 5 Juillet 1962; Referee: Djamel Haimoudi
Note: Lineup for MC Alger - Zemmamouche, Besseghier, Khedis, Zeddam, Coulibaly, Bouchema, Bouguèche (c), Koudri, Amroune, Attafen (Boumechra, 71’), Bensalem (Hamrat, 84’) - Coach: Alain Michel

23 October 2009 Round 10	MC Alger	1–1	AS Khroub	Algiers
19:00	Boumechra 52'	Soccerway report	Daoudi 73' (pen.)	Stadium: Stade 5 Juillet 1962; Referee: Mohamed Hediaf
Note: Lineup for MC Alger - Zemmamouche, Senouci, Khedis (Bensalem 80’), Zeddam, Coulibaly, Koudri, Bouchema, Boumechra, Derrag, Amroune (Hamrat 49’), Bouguèche (c) (Belkheir Abdenour 89’) - Coach: Alain Michel

31 October 2009 Round 11	WA Tlemcen	2–1	MC Alger	Tlemcen
14:30	Ghazali 19', 44'	Soccerway report	Bouguèche 16'	Stadium: Stade Akid Lotfi; Referee: Boubekeur Zouaoui
Note: Lineup for MC Alger - Zemmamouche, Besseghier, Bensalem, Coulibaly, Zeddam, Khedis (Attafen 55’), Bouguèche (c), Boumechra, Amroune (Belkheir Abdenour 69’), Bouchema, Derrag (Hamrat 85’) - Coach: Alain Michel

7 November 2009 Round 12	MC Alger	4–1	MC Oran	Algiers
18:00	Boudebouda 13', 51'; Bouguèche 47', 85'	Soccerway report	El Bahari 67'	Stadium: Stade 5 Juillet 1962; Referee: Mohamed Bouali
Note: Lineup for MC Alger - Zemmamouche, Besseghier, Boudebouda, Zeddam, Coulibaly, Koudri, Bensalem (Khedis 90’), Boumechra, Bouguèche (c), Attafen (Kabla 85’), Derrag (Amroune 78’) - Coach: Alain Michel

21 November 2009 Round 13	JSM Béjaïa	1–1	MC Alger	Béjaïa
14:30	Boulemdaïs 48'	Soccerway report	Amroune 74'	Stadium: Stade de l'Unité Maghrébine; Referee: Mokhtar Amalou
Note: Lineup for MC Alger - Zemamouche, Besseghier, Boudebouda, Coulibaly, Zeddam, Koudri, (Bensalem 52’), Baâbouche (c), Bouchema, Bouguèche, Boumechra, (Amroune 72’ puis Attafen 87’), Derrag - Coach: Alain Michel

5 December 2009 Round 15	MC El Eulma	1–1	MC Alger	El Eulma
14:30	Belhamel 55'	Soccerway report	Attafen 57'	Stadium: Stade Messaoud Zougar; Referee: Djamel Haimoudi
Note: Lineup for MC Alger - Zemmamouche, Besseghier, Baâbouche (c), Zeddam, Coulibaly, Koudri, Moumen (Belkheir Abdenour 90’), Attafen (Kabla 86’), Bouguèche, Boumechra, Derrag (Amroune 80’) - Coach: François Bracci

11 December 2009 Round 16	MC Alger	4–2	CR Belouizdad	Algiers
18:00	Babouche 21', 51' (pen.); Attafen 66'; Bouguèche 88'	Soccerway report	Saïbi 3'; Berradja 71'	Stadium: Stade 5 Juillet 1962; Referee: Mohamed Haddada
Note: Lineup for MC Alger - Zemmamouche, Besseghier, Boudebouda, Zeddam, Coulibaly, Koudri, Baâbouche (c), Bouchema, Bouguèche (Amroune, 90’+2), Attafen (Boumechra, 81’), Derrag - Coach: François Bracci

15 December 2009 Round 17	MSP Batna	1–1	MC Alger	Batna
14:00	Loumane 1'	Soccerway report	Besseghir 90'	Stadium: Stade 1er Novembre 1954; Attendance: 0 (close doors); Referee: Mohamed Benouza
Note: Lineup for MC Alger - Zemmamouche, Besseghier, Baâbouche (c), Coulibaly, Zeddam, Koudri, Bouchema, Boumechra (Amroune 58'), Bouguèche, Attafen, Derrag - Coach: François Bracci

18 December 2009 (Note: The match was originally to be played on 26 September 2009, but it was postponed.) Round 7	MC Alger	2–1	USM El Harrach	Algiers
18:00	Derrag 39'; Attafen 54'	Soccerway report	Hanitser 6'	Stadium: Stade 5 Juillet 1962; Referee: Boubekeur Zouaoui
Note: Lineup for MC Alger - Zemmamouche, Besseghier, Baâbouche (c), Zeddam, Coulibaly, Koudri (? 90’+2), Bouchema, Bouguèche, Boumechra, Attafen, Derrag (Amroune 86’) - Coach: François Bracci

16 January 2010 Round 18	USM Annaba	2–0	MC Alger	Annaba
14:30	Maïza 74'; Gasmi 88'	Soccerway report		Stadium: Stade 19 Mai 1956; Referee: Djamel Haimoudi
Note: Lineup for MC Alger - Ouamane, Besseghier, Boudebouda (Kabla 86'), Harkat, Zeddam, Bouchema, Bouguèche, Attafen, Derrag, Mokdad (Amroune 83'), Boumechra - Coach: François Bracci

22 January 2010 Round 19	MC Alger	3–1	CA Bordj Bou Arreridj	Algiers
18:00	Mokdad 4'; Boumechra 7'; Koudri 31'	Soccerway report	Ammour 15'	Stadium: Stade 5 Juillet 1962; Referee: Redouane Necib
Note: Lineup for MC Alger - Ouamane, Senouci, Boudebouda, Zeddam, Harkat, Koudri, Bouchema, Boumechra, Bouguèche (c), Mokdad (Attafen 62’), Derrag (Bensalem 83’) - Coach: François Bracci

30 January 2010 Round 20	USM Blida	1–1	MC Alger	Blida
14:30	Abed 10'	Soccerway report	Boumechra 90+4' (pen.)	Stadium: Stade Mustapha Tchaker; Referee: Farouk Houasnia
Note: Lineup for MC Alger - Ouamane, Senouci, Boudebouda, Zeddam, Harkat, Bouchema (Hadjadj 38’), Mokdad (Bensalem 75’), Koudri, Bouguèche (c), Amroune (Attafen 66’) - Coach: François Bracci

5 February 2010 Round 21	MC Alger	1–0	ASO Chlef	Algiers
18:00	Bouguèche 62'	Soccerway report		Stadium: Stade 5 Juillet 1962; Referee: Mohamed Bichari
Note: Lineup for MC Alger - Zemmamouche, Senouci, Boudebouda, Zeddam, Harkat, Koudri, Boumechra, Hadjadj (Baâbouche 60’), Bouguèche (cap), Mokdad (Megherbi 90’), Derrag (Attafen 73’) - Coach: François Bracci

9 February 2010 (Note: The match was originally to be played on 1 December 2009, but it was postponed.) Round 14	MC Alger	1–1	ES Sétif	Algiers
18:00	Bouguèche 52'	Soccerway report	Laifaoui 71'	Stadium: Stade du 5 Juillet; Referee: Mohamed Benouza
Note: Lineup for MC Alger - Zemmamouche, Besseghier, Baâbouche (c), Zeddam, Harkat, Koudri, Bouchema, Mokdad (Attafen 75’), Derrag, Boumechra, Bouguèche - Coach: François Bracci

23 February 2010 Round 22	JS Kabylie	0–0	MC Alger	Tizi Ouzou
14:00		Soccerway report		Stadium: Stade 1er Novembre 1954; Attendance: 21,240; Referee: Djamel Haimoudi
Note: Lineup for MC Alger - Zemmamouche, Besseghier, Baâbouche (c), Harkat, Zeddam, Koudri, Bouchema, Mokdad (Attafen 76’), Derrag (Amroune 80’), Boumechra, Bouguèche - Coach: François Bracci

26 February 2010 Round 23	MC Alger	2–0	NA Hussein Dey	Bologhine
18:00	Bouguèche 11'; Amroune 90+1'	Soccerway report		Stadium: Omar Hamadi Stadium; Referee: Said Douala
Note: Lineup for MC Alger - Zemmamouche, Besseghier, Baâbouche (c), Harkat, Zeddam, Koudri, Boumechra, Hadjadj (Boudebouda 71’), Attafen (Mokdad 68’), Derrag, Bouguèche - Coach: François Bracci

30 March 2010 (Note: The match was originally to be played on 6 March 2010, but it was postponed.) Round 24	USM El Harrach	0–0	MC Alger	Algiers
15:00		Soccerway report		Stadium: Stade du 1er-Novembre-1954; Referee: Mehdi Abid Charef
Note: Lineup for MC Alger - Zemmamouche, Besseghier, Baâbouche (c) (Mokdad 8’), Zeddam, Harkat, Boudebouda, Boumechra, Bouchema, Derrag, Attafen, Bouguèche - Coach: François Bracci

19 March 2010 Round 25	MC Alger	2–1	CA Batna	Bologhine
14:30	Bouguèche 59'; Megharbi 80'	Soccerway report	Boukhlouf 25'	Stadium: Omar Hamadi Stadium; Referee: Mohamed Haddada
Note: Lineup for MC Alger - Zemmamouche, Besseghier, Baâbouche (c), Zeddam, Megherbi, Koudri, Boumechra (Amroune 74’), Bouchema, Bouguèche (Boudebouda 85’), Attafen (Mokdad 54’), Derrag - Coach: François Bracci

23 March 2010 Round 26	USM Alger	1–2	MC Alger	Algiers
14:30	Hamidi 90'	Soccerway report	Derrag 44'; Saidoune 73' (o.g.)	Stadium: Stade 5 Juillet 1962; Referee: Farouk Houasnia
Note: Lineup for MC Alger - Zemmamouche, Besseghier (Senouci 82’), Baâbouche (c), Zeddam, Boudebouda, Koudri, Bouchema, Boumechra, Mokdad (Attafen 60’), Bouguèche, Derrag (Amroune 88’) - Coach: François Bracci

6 April 2010 Round 27	AS Khroub	0–2	MC Alger	El Khroub
15:00		Soccerway report	Derrag 48'; Bouguèche 58'	Stadium: Stade Abed Hamdani; Referee: Boubekeur Zouaoui
Note: Lineup for MC Alger - Zemmamouche, Besseghier, Boudebdouba, Harkat, Zeddam, Mokdad, Bouchema, Attafen (Daoud Farid 80'), Bouguèche (Amroune 72'), Boumechra, Derrag (Bensalem 84') - Coach: François Bracci

24 April 2010 Round 28	MC Alger	1–0	WA Tlemcen	Bologhine
17:00	Bouguèche 33'	Soccerway report		Stadium: Omar Hamadi Stadium; Referee: Rafik Achouri
Note: Lineup for MC Alger - Ouamane, Senouci, Bensalem, Zeddam, Harkat, Mokdad, Bouchema, Boumechra, Attafen (Koudri 74'), Derrag (Megherbi 90'), Bouguèche (c) - Coach: François Bracci

4 May 2010 Round 29	MC Oran	0–0	MC Alger	Oran
17:00		Soccerway report		Stadium: Stade Ahmed Zabana; Referee: Mehdi Abid Charef
Note: Lineup for MC Alger - Zemmamouche, Senouci, Baâbouche (c), Harkat, Zeddam, Koudri, Bouchema, Boumechra (Attafen 76’), Mokdad (Amroune 66’), Derrag, Bouguèche - Coach: François Bracci

13 May 2010 Round 30	MC Alger	1–1	JSM Béjaïa	Algiers
17:00	Megharbi 40'	Soccerway report	Boulaïnceur 34'	Stadium: Stade 5 Juillet 1962; Referee: Farouk Houasnia
Note: Lineup for MC Alger - Ouamane, Senouci, Boudebouda, Megherbi, Zeddam, Koudri (c), Bouchema, Attafen, Mokdad (Kabla 81’), Bensalem (Baâbouche 66’), Amroune - Coach: François Bracci

22 May 2010 Round 31	ES Sétif	2–1	MC Alger	Sétif
17:00	Metref 7'; Hemani 16'	Soccerway report	Derrag 4'	Stadium: Stade 8 Mai 1945; Referee: Djamel Haimoudi
Note: Lineup for MC Alger - Ouamane, Senouci, Baâbouche (c), Zeddam, Harkat, Mokdad, Koudri, Bouchema, Megherbi (Attafen 33’), Derrag, Bouguèche - Coach: François Bracci

25 May 2010 Round 32	MC Alger	3–1	MC El Eulma	Algiers
17:00	Bouguèche 29'; Attafen 36'; Mokdad 51'	Soccerway report	Khaoua 71' (pen.)	Stadium: Stade 5 Juillet 1962; Referee: Sofiane Bousseter
Note: Lineup for MC Alger - Slimani Billel, Senouci, Baâbouche (c) (Besseghier 45’), Zeddam, Harkat, Koudri, Bouchema (Daoud Farid 84’), Attafen, Mokdad, Derrag (Boumechra 73’), Bouguèche - Coach: François Bracci

28 May 2010 Round 33	CR Belouizdad	0–0	MC Alger	Algiers
17:00		Soccerway report		Stadium: Stade 5 Juillet 1962; Referee: Mohamed Bichari
Note: Lineup for MC Alger - Zemmamouche (c), Besseghier, Baâbouche, Harkat, Zeddam, Bouchema, Attafen (Boumechra 63’), Daoud Farid, Mokdad, Derrag, Bouguèche - Coach: François Bracci

31 May 2010 Round 34	MC Alger	4–0	MSP Batna	Algiers
17:00	Derrag 25', 61'; Bouguèche 38' (pen.), 78'	Soccerway report		Stadium: Stade 5 Juillet 1962; Referee: Mokhtar Amalou
Note: Lineup for MC Alger - Zemmamouche (Slimani 86’), Senouci, Boudebouda, Zeddam, Harkat, Koudri, Attafen (Aberrane 77’), Bouchema, Bouguèche (c), Mokdad, Derrag (Hamrat 65’) - Coach: François Bracci

=== Algerian Cup ===
25 December 2009 Round of 64	MC Alger	5–2	JSM Tiaret	Ouargla
14:30	Amroune 28'; Attafen 52'; Koudri 68'; Boumechra 87', 90'		Baouche 51'	Stadium: Stade du 18 février Attendance: 0 (close doors); Referee: Achouri, Tamen, Arribi
Note: Lineup for MC Alger - Zemmamouche, Besseghier (Senouci 63’), Baâbouche (c), Zeddam, Khedis, Koudri, Bouchema, Attafen (Boudebouda 85’), Derrag, Bensalem (Boumechra 59’), Amroune.

19 February 2010 Round of 32	SC Ain Merane	0–1	MC Alger	Chlef
14:30			Koudri 90'	Stadium: Stade Mohamed Boumezrag; Referee: Oukal, Laribi, Oudam
Note: Lineup for MC Alger - Ouamane, Besseghier (Senouci 94'), Boudebouda, Megherbi, Harkat, Koudri (c), Hadjadj, Boumechra, Mokdad (Attafen 68'), Derrag, Amroune (Bouguèche 83').

16 March 2010 Round of 16	MC Alger	3–0	USM Alger	Algiers
14:00	Bedbouda 64'; Derrag 69'; Zemmamouche 90+2' (pen.)			Stadium: Stade 5 Juillet 1962; Referee: Necib, Bahloul, Guedjali
Note: Lineup for MC Alger - Zemmamouche, Besseghier, Baâbouche (c), Boudebouda, Megherbi, Koudri, Bouchema, Boumechra (Hadjadj 82’), Derrag (Amroune 90+4’), Bouguèche (Attafen 82’).

9 April 2010 Quarter-finals	CA Batna	1–0 (a.e.t.)	MC Alger	Batna
14:30	Boukhlouf 93'			Stadium: Stade 1er Novembre 1954; Referee: Bouhenni, Amari, Mezrioua
Note: Lineup for MC Alger - Zemmamouche, Besseghier (Hamrat 106'), Boudebouda, Harkat, Zeddam, Bouchema, Attafen (Bensalem 109'), Amroune, Boumechra, Derrag.

== Squad information ==
=== Appearances and goals ===
No.	Pos	Player	Nat	Ligue 1			Algerian Cup			Total		
No.	Pos	Player	Nat	App	St	G	App	St	G	App	St	G
Goalkeepers
1	GK	Mohamed Lamine Zemmamouche	(Algeria)	27	27	0	3	3	1	30	30	1
26	GK	Mohamed Reda Ouamane	(Algeria)	6	6	0	1	1	0	7	7	0
	GK	Boualem Bilel Slimani	(Algeria)	2	1	0	0	0	0	2	1	0
Defenders
12	CB	Moussa Coulibaly	(Mali)	16	16	0	0	0	0	16	16	0
25	CB	Hamza Zeddam	(Algeria)	34	34	0	2	2	0	36	36	0
5	CB	Sid Ahmed Khedis	(Algeria)	7	3	0	1	1	0	8	4	0
	CB	Sofiane Harkat	(Algeria)	15	15	0	2	2	0	17	17	0
6	CB	Mohamed Megharbi	(Algeria)	5	3	2	2	2	0	7	5	2
24	DF	Mohamed Aberrane	(Algeria)	1	0	0	0	0	0	1	0	0
11	DF	Abdelkader Besseghir	(Algeria)	21	20	0	4	4	0	25	24	0
	DF	Ibrahim Essaïd	(Algeria)	1	0	0	0	0	0	1	0	0
22	DF	Benziane Senouci	(Algeria)	14	13	0	2	0	0	16	13	0
15	DF	Reda Babouche	(Algeria)	24	22	4	2	2	0	26	24	4
	DF	Zinedine Bensalem	(Algeria)	11	4	0	2	1	0	13	5	0
4	DF	Brahim Boudebouda	(Algeria)	17	15	3	4	3	1	21	18	4
Midfielders
10	MF	Fodil Hadjadj	(Algeria)	3	2	0	1	0	0	4	2	0
23	MF	Hamza Koudri	(Algeria)	27	26	1	3	3	2	30	29	3
13	MF	Nassim Bouchema	(Algeria)	28	28	1	2	2	0	30	30	1
18	MF	Farid Daoud	(Algeria)	2	1	0	1	1	0	3	2	0
27	MF	Bilal Moumen	(Algeria)	8	3	0	0	0	0	8	3	0
14	MF	Salim Ryad Kabla	(Algeria)	4	0	0	0	0	0	4	0	0
7	MF	Abdelmalek Mokdad	(Algeria)	18	15	2	3	3	0	21	18	2
8	MF	Billel Attafen	(Algeria)	30	19	4	4	2	1	34	21	5
20	MF	Salim Boumechra	(Algeria)	31	24	3	4	3	2	35	27	5
Forwards
16	FW	Abdenour Belkheir	(Algeria)	4	0	0	0	0	0	4	0	0
19	FW	Hadj Bouguèche	(Algeria)	33	33	17	2	1	0	35	34	17
9	FW	Mohamed Derrag	(Algeria)	31	31	7	4	4	1	35	35	8
29	FW	Mohamed Amroune	(Algeria)	24	11	5	4	3	1	28	14	6
21	FW	Mohamed Issam Hamrat	(Algeria)	7	1	0	1	0	0	8	1	0
Total				34		50	4		9	38		59

Last updated: 31 May 2010

=== Goalscorers ===
Includes all competitive matches. The list is sorted alphabetically by surname when total goals are equal.

No.	Nat.	Player	Pos.	N 1	AC	TOTAL
19	(Algeria)	Hadj Bouguèche	FW	17	0	17
9	(Algeria)	Mohamed Derrag	FW	7	1	8
29	(Algeria)	Mohamed Amroune	FW	5	1	6
20	(Algeria)	Salim Boumechra	MF	3	2	5
8	(Algeria)	Billel Attafen	MF	4	1	5
15	(Algeria)	Reda Babouche	DF	4	0	4
4	(Algeria)	Brahim Boudebouda	DF	3	1	4
23	(Algeria)	Hamza Koudri	MF	1	2	3
6	(Algeria)	Mohamed Megharbi	DF	2	0	2
7	(Algeria)	Abdelmalek Mokdad	MF	2	0	2
13	(Algeria)	Nassim Bouchema	MF	1	0	1
Own Goals				1	0	1
Totals				50	9	59
