= Ahcène Lahmar =

Algerian footballer (1980–2009)

Personal information
- Date of birth: 3 August 1980
- Place of birth: Taher, Algeria
- Date of death: 8 October 2009 (aged 29)
- Place of death: Béjaïa, Algeria
- Position: Midfielder

Senior career*
Years	Team	Apps	(Gls)
2006–2007	JSM Béjaïa		
2007–2008	MSP Batna		
2008–2009	JSM Béjaïa		
- * Club domestic league appearances and goals

Ahcène Lahmar (3 August 1980 in Taher, Jijel Province – 8 October 2009 in Béjaïa) was an Algerian footballer. He played as a midfielder for JSM Béjaïa and MSP Batna.

== Death ==
On 8 October 2009, Lahmar died from a heart attack in a hospital room in the Frantz Fanon Hospital in Béjaïa, Algeria, after suffering from pneumonia.

He was honored by his club JSM Béjaïa in its next game following his death, a league match against CA Bordj Bou Arreridj. Players from both teams entered the pitch with black t-shirts with his face on them. Club officials then held an official ceremony presenting his father and two brothers an official framed jersey before holding a minute of silence in his honor prior to kick off. The fans in the stadium also prepared a giant two-piece black tifo with the messages "Lahmar 24" and "Repose en paix" (Rest in Peace).
