= Mohamed Benhamou =

Algerian footballer (born 1979)

Personal information
- Full name: Mohamed Benhamou
- Date of birth: December 17, 1979 (age 46)
- Place of birth: Paris, France
- Height: 1.75 m (5 ft 9 in)
- Position: Goalkeeper

Youth career
- 1987–2001: Red Star
- 2001–2003: Paris Saint-Germain

Senior career*
Years	Team	Apps	(Gls)
2003–2006	Paris Saint-Germain	0	(0)
2006–2007	Cannes	34	(0)
2007–2009	MC Alger	17	(0)
2009–2010	MC Oran	6	(0)
2011–2012	ES Sétif	24	(0)
2012–2014	USM Annaba		
2014–2018	Viry-Châtillon	104	(0)
2018	US Lusitanos	1	(0)

International career
2004	Algeria	7	(0)

Managerial career
- 2016–2018: Viry-Châtillon (goalkeeper)
- 2018–2019: US Lusitanos (goalkeeper)
- 2019–2020: Fujairah (goalkeeper)
- 2020–2021: USM Alger (goalkeeper)
- 2021–2023: Algeria A' (goalkeeper)
- 2024–2026: Al-Markhiya (goalkeeper)
- 2026: Lebanon (goalkeeper)
- * Club domestic league appearances and goals

Mohamed Benhamou (Arabic: محمد بن حمو; born 17 December 1979) is a professional football coach and former player. Born in France, he played as a goalkeeper for the Algeria national team.

== Playing career ==
Born in Paris, Benhamou began his career as a left-back at age 7 with Red Star Saint-Ouen.

Benhamou joined after one season with AS Cannes in the French Championnat National (third division). Prior to signing with Cannes in the summer of 2006, he spent five seasons with Paris Saint-Germain. He has seven caps for the Algerian national team.

In January 2011, Benhamou signed a contract with ES Sétif.

== Coaching career ==
From the summer 2018 to the summer 2019, Benhamou worked as a goalkeeper coach for the US Lusitanos, where he also was available as a player. He made one appearance for the club in October 2018. In July 2019, he was hired by Emirati club Fujairah FC as a goalkeeper coach. In August 2020, he was hired by USM Alger as a goalkeeper coach. In September 2026, he was appointed as goalkeeper coach of the Lebanon national team, as part of Madjid Bougherra's technical staff.

== Career statistics ==
Appearances and goals by national team and year
National team	Year	Apps	Goals
Algeria	2004	7	0
Total		7	0

== Honours ==
Sétif

- Algerian Cup: 2011–12
- Algerian Ligue Professionnelle 1: 2011–12
