= Abdelmadjid Tahraoui =

Algerian footballer (born 1981)

Madjid Tahraoui
Personal information
- Full name: Moussa Abdelmadjid Tahraoui Douma
- Date of birth: February 24, 1981 (age 45)
- Place of birth: Chlef, Algeria
- Height: 1.83 m (6 ft 0 in)
- Position: Forward

Senior career*
Years	Team	Apps	(Gls)
1999–2005	ASO Chlef	-	(-)
2005–2006	USM Blida	33	(3)
2006–2008	MC Alger	16	(2)
2008	OMR El Annasser	-	(-)
2008–2009	MC Oran	-	(-)
2009–2010	Asswehly S.C.	-	(-)

International career^{‡}
2004	Algeria	1	(1)
- * Club domestic league appearances and goals ‡ National team caps and goals as of 10:46, 31 December 2010 (UTC)

Moussa Abdelmadjid Tahraoui Douma (Arabic: عبدالمجيد طهراوي) (born February 24, 1981) is an Algerian professional footballer. He is currently unattached after last playing for Asswehly S.C. in the Libyan Premier League.

== Club career ==
In the summer of 2005, Tahraoui joined USM Blida on a transfer from ASO Chlef. At the time, the transfer fee of 12,5 million Algerian dinars (€138,500) paid by USM Blida was the highest fee paid between two Algerian clubs.

== International career ==
On August 17, 2004, Tahraoui made his debut for the Algerian National Team in a friendly against Burkina Faso. He started the match and scored a goal in the 33rd minute. He was subbed off at halftime for Salim Arrache.

=== International goals ===
Scores and results list Algeria's goal tally first.

Goal	Date	Venue	Opponent	Score	Result	Competition
1	17 August 2004	Stade 5 Juillet 1962, Algiers	Burkina Faso	1–0	2–2	Friendly
