= Harouna Bamogo =

Burkinabé football player

Personal information
- Full name: Harouna Bamogo
- Date of birth: June 10, 1983 (age 43)
- Place of birth: Ouagadougou, Upper Volta
- Height: 1.83 m (6 ft 0 in)
- Position: Defender

Youth career
- 2000 – 2001: USFA

Senior career*
Years	Team	Apps	(Gls)
2001–2002	ASFB		(? ?)
2002–2006	RC Kadiogo		(? ?)
2006–2006	MC Alger		(4 ?)
2007–2008	WA Tlemcen		(18 1)
2008–2011	Khaleej Sirte		(? ?)

International career^{‡}
2005–2007	Burkina Faso	8	(0)
- * Club domestic league appearances and goals ‡ National team caps and goals as of 17:25, 25 May 2010 (UTC)

Harouna Bamogo (Arabic: هارونا باموقو) is a Burkinabé football player.

Bamogo was released by WA Tlemcen at the end of the 2007–08 season as they were relegated from the Algerian Championnat National. He was subsequently signed by Khaleej on a free transfer in December 2008

He played for the Burkina Faso national football team twice in 2006.
