= Lassana Diarra (Malian footballer) =

Malian professional footballer

Personal information
- Date of birth: 29 December 1989 (age 36)
- Place of birth: Mali
- Position: Forward

Team information
- Current team: Djoliba AC
- Number: 15

Senior career*
Years	Team	Apps	(Gls)
2007	MC Alger	3	(0)
2013–	Djoliba AC	6	(4)

International career
2009–	Mali	5	(3)
- * Club domestic league appearances and goals

Lassana Diarra (born 29 December 1989) is a Malian professional footballer, who plays as a forward for Djoliba AC.

== International career ==
In January 2014, coach Djibril Dramé, invited him to be a part of the Mali squad for the 2014 African Nations Championship. He helped the team to the quarter-finals where they lost to Zimbabwe by two goals to one.
