= Slimane Illoul =

Algerian footballer (born 1983)

Personal information
- Full name: Slimane Illoul
- Date of birth: December 12, 1983 (age 42)
- Place of birth: Kouba, Algiers, Algeria
- Height: 1.80 m (5 ft 11 in)
- Position: Midfielder

Team information
- Current team: USM Blida

Senior career*
| Years | Team | Apps | (Gls) |
| 2000–2006 | RC Kouba | 2 | (1) |
| 2006–2007 | MC Alger | 14 | (0) |
| 2007–2008 | RC Kouba | - | (-) |
| 2008–2010 | CA Bordj Bou Arréridj | 26 | (1) |
| 2010–2011 | CA Batna | 2 | (1) |
| 2011–2012 | USM Blida | 13 | (0) |
| 2012–2013 | MC El Eulma | 2 | (0) |
| 2013–2015 | MO Constantine | 1 | (0) |
- * Club domestic league appearances and goals as of 00:00, 09 August 2024 (UTC)

Slimane Illoul (born December 12, 1983) is an Algerian football player. He currently plays for USM Blida in the Algerian Ligue Professionnelle 1.
