= Sofiane Azzedine =

Algerian football goalkeeper (born 1980)

Personal information
- Full name: Sofiane Azzedine
- Date of birth: September 24, 1980 (age 46)
- Place of birth: Algeria
- Position: Goalkeeper

Team information
- Current team: MC Alger

Senior career*
Years	Team	Apps	(Gls)
1999–2002	JS Bordj Ménaïel	-	(-)
2002–2003	JSM Béjaïa	-	(-)
2005–2008	MC Alger	-	(-)
2010–2011	US Biskra	-	(-)
2011–	MC Alger	8	(0)
- * Club domestic league appearances and goals as of 00:00, November 30, 2011 (UTC)

Sofiane Azzedine (born 24 September 1980) is an Algerian football goalkeeper who plays for MC Alger in the Algerian Ligue Professionnelle 1. He played a major role in qualifying the club to the Algerian Cup Final in 2007.

== Club career ==
On January 21, 2011, Azzedine signed an 18-month contract with MC Alger.
