= Enrico Fabbro =

Italian football manager

Personal information
- Date of birth: 14 May 1959 (age 67)
- Place of birth: Rome, Italy

Team information
- Current team: Stade Gabésien

Managerial career
- Years: Team
- 2006–2008: MC Alger
- 2012–2013: JS Kabylie
- 2018–: Stade Gabésien

Enrico Fabbro (born 14 June 1959) is an Italian football manager.

== Career ==
Born in Rome, Fabbro started his professional career working with the youth sector of Lodigiani (1994 to 1999), Lazio (1999 to 2004) and Cisco Lodigiani (new denomination of Lodigiani, in 2004–2005), also winning a Giovanissimi Nazionali national title with Lazio in 2001. In 2006, he took his first head coaching job, as manager of leading Algerian club MC Alger, winning an Algerian Cup and then resigning from his coaching post immediately after guiding his club to win the Algerian Super Cup in November 2007. He then accepted an offer from Ascoli to guide their Primavera squad for the 2008–09 season.

He worked as a football commentator for pay-per-view television network Dahlia TV. He currently works as a coach of the Tunisian team Stade Gabésien.
