= Larbi Hosni =

Algerian footballer (born 1981)

Personal information
- Full name: Larbi Hosni
- Date of birth: February 11, 1981 (age 45)
- Place of birth: Algiers, Algeria
- Height: 1.81 m (5 ft 11 in)
- Position: Defender

Senior career*
Years	Team	Apps	(Gls)
2000–2006	RC Kouba	22	(0)
2006–2008	MC Alger	42	(0)
2008–2009	USM Alger	15	(0)
2009–2010	ASO Chlef	11	(0)
2010–2011	RC Kouba		
2011–2012	CA Bordj Bou Arréridj		
2012-2013	MO Constantine		
2013-2016	NARB Réghaïa		

International career^{‡}
2007	Algeria	3	(0)
- * Club domestic league appearances and goals ‡ National team caps and goals as of 25 August 2010

Larbi Hosni (born February 11, 1981, in Algiers) is an Algerian former footballer. He most recently played as a defender for NARB Reghaïa in the Algerian Ligue Professionnelle 2.

== International career ==
Hosni received his first cap for Algeria in a 2–1 friendly win against Libya on February 7, 2007. Since then, he made 2 more appearances for the team, first as a substitute in a friendly against Argentina (3–4), then as a starter in another friendly against Brazil (0–2).

== Honours ==
- Won the Algerian Cup once with MC Alger in 2007.
- Won the Algerian Super Cup twice with MC Alger in 2006 and 2007
- Has 3 caps for the Algerian National Team
