= Moussa Coulibaly (footballer, born 1981) =

Malian footballer

Personal information
- Full name: Hadj Moussa Coulibaly
- Date of birth: 19 May 1981 (age 45)
- Place of birth: Bamako, Mali
- Height: 1.72 m (5 ft 8 in)
- Position: Right-back

Senior career*
Years	Team	Apps	(Gls)
2000–2004	AS Bamako		
2004–2010	MC Alger	119	(7)
2010–2011	Ahly Tripoli		
2011–2012	Darnes		

International career
2002–2008	Mali	5	(1)
- * Club domestic league appearances and goals

Hadj Moussa "Elimane" Coulibaly (born 19 May 1981) is a Malian former professional footballer who played as a right-back.

He was part of the Malian 2004 Olympic football team, who exited in the quarter finals, finishing top of group A, but losing to Italy in the next round.

His cousin, Adama Coulibaly too, plays for Mali.

== Honours ==
MC Alger

- Algerian Cup: 2006, 2007
- Algerian Super Cup: 2006, 2007

Individual

- Algerian League 'Foreign Player of the Year': 2006–07
