= Fodil Hadjadj =

Algerian footballer (born 1983)

Personal information
- Full name: Fodil Hadjadj
- Date of birth: April 18, 1983 (age 43)
- Place of birth: Algiers, Algeria
- Height: 1.81 m (5 ft 11 in)
- Position: Midfielder

Youth career
- 1993–1999: MC Alger
- 1999–2003: FC Nantes

Senior career*
| Years | Team | Apps | (Gls) |
| 2003–2005 | FC Nantes | 23 | (1) |
| 2005–2010 | MC Alger | 82 | (1) |
| 2011–2012 | CS Constantine | 34 | (2) |
| 2012–2013 | ASO Chlef | | (0) |
| 2013–2014 | CR Belouizdad | | (0) |

International career^{‡}
| 2003–2007 | Algeria | 10 | (0) |
- * Club domestic league appearances and goals as of 00:00, September 21, 2013 (UTC) ‡ National team caps and goals as of 00:00, May 22, 2012 (UTC)

Fodil Hadjadj (Arabic: فضيل حجاج; born April 18, 1983) is an Algerian former football player.

== Career ==
Hadjadj began his career in the junior ranks at MC Alger. During a tournament with the MC Alger junior team in France, he was noticed by scouts for FC Nantes and signed to the academy team there. In 2003, he signed a 2-year professional contract with Nantes and went on to make 23 appearances and scoring 1 goal for the club in his 2 seasons at the club. In 2005, despite interest from several Italian Serie B teams, he returned to MC Alger.

== International career ==
Hadjadj was part of the Algerian 2004 African Nations Cup team, who finished second in their group in the first round of competition before being defeated by Morocco in the quarter-finals.

== National team statistics ==
Algeria national team
| Year | Apps | Goals |
|---|---|---|
| 2003 | 3 | 0 |
| 2004 | 6 | 0 |
| 2005 | 0 | 0 |
| 2006 | 0 | 0 |
| 2007 | 1 | 0 |
| Total | 10 | 0 |

== Honours ==
- Won the Algerian Cup twice with MC Alger in 2006 and 2007
- Won the Algerian Super Cup twice with MC Alger in 2006 and 2007
- Won the Algerian Championnat National once with MC Alger in 2010
