= Hadj Bouguèche =

Algerian footballer (born 1983)

Personal information
- Full name: Hadj Bouguèche
- Date of birth: 7 December 1983 (age 42)
- Place of birth: Arzew, Algeria
- Height: 1.74 m (5 ft 9 in)
- Position: Striker

Senior career*
| Years | Team | Apps | (Gls) |
| 2000–2002 | OM Arzew | - | (-) |
| 2002–2004 | RC Kouba | 48 | (12) |
| 2004–2005 | USM Blida | 22 | (2) |
| 2005–2010 | MC Alger | 135 | (41) |
| 2010–2011 | Emirates Club | 20 | (12) |
| 2011–2012 | Al-Qadisiyah | 16 | (8) |
| 2012 | Al Nassr | 7 | (4) |
| 2012–2013 | Al-Taawon | 16 | (2) |
| 2013–2014 | MC Alger | 36 | (5) |
| 2014–2015 | USM Bel-Abbès | 15 | (1) |
| 2015–2016 | USM El Harrach | 40 | (10) |
| 2016–2017 | MC Alger | 23 | (3) |
| 2017–2018 | USM El Harrach | 25 | (6) |
| 2018–2020 | WA Tlemcen | | (3) |
| 2020–2022 | NC Magra | | (8) |
| 2022–2024 | ES Ben Aknoun | | |

International career
| 2003–2005 | Algeria U23 | 11 | (3) |
| 2004–2007 | Algeria | 3 | (0) |
| 2010 | Algeria A' | 2 | (0) |
- * Club domestic league appearances and goals

Hadj Bouguèche (Arabic: حاج بوقاش; born 7 December 1983) is an Algerian former football player.

== Club career ==
On 16 July 2010 it was announced that Bouguèche signed a two-year contract with Emirati-side Emirates Club, joining the club on a free transfer. On 20 August 2010 Bougueche made his debut for the club starting in the 3–1 win over Al Wahda in the 2010 UAE Super Cup.

On 13 July 2011 Bouguèche signed a one-year contract with Saudi Professional League side Al-Qadisiyah FC. Bouguèche moved to Al-Nassr club on 21 January 2012, they lost final in the 2012 King Cup of Champions against Al-Ahli losing 4-1 scores. His standing record in Al-Qadisiyah and Al-Nassr is 23 appearances and 12 goals. Bouguèche signed with Al-Taawon club.

== International career ==
On 17 August 2004 Bouguèche received his first cap for the Algerian National Team as a starter in a friendly against Burkina Faso. In the 54th minute of the game, he provided an assist for Salim Arrache. The game ended 2-2. Two weeks later, he was called up to the team, this time for the 2006 FIFA World Cup qualifier against Gabon. With the team losing 2–0, Bouguèche was inserted into the game as a 79th-minute substitute for Slimane Raho. However, Gabon added a third goal in the 88th minute and won the game 3–0.

== Honours ==
- Won the Algerian Cup twice with MC Alger in 2006 and 2007
- Won the Algerian Super Cup twice with MC Alger in 2006 and 2007
- Won the Algerian League once with MC Alger in 2009–2010
- Won the UAE Super Cup once with Emirates Club in 2010
- Top scorer of the Algerian Championnat National once with MC Alger in 2009–2010 with 17 goals
- Has 3 caps for the Algerian National Team

== National team statistics ==
Algeria national team
| Year | Apps | Goals |
|---|---|---|
| 2004 | 2 | 0 |
| 2005 | 0 | 0 |
| 2006 | 0 | 0 |
| 2007 | 1 | 0 |
| Total | 3 | 0 |
