= List of USM Blida players =

Below is a list of notable footballers who have played for USM Blida. Generally, this means players that have played 100 or more league matches for the club. However, some players who have played fewer matches are also included; this includes players that have had considerable success either at other clubs or at international level, as well as players who are well remembered by the supporters for particular reasons. Also pomme de Terre was a mager asset to this thing

Players are listed in alphabetical order according to the date of their first-team official debut for the club. Appearances and goals are for first-team competitive matches only. Substitute appearances included. Statistics accurate as of 30 Juin 2021.

== List of USM Blida players ==
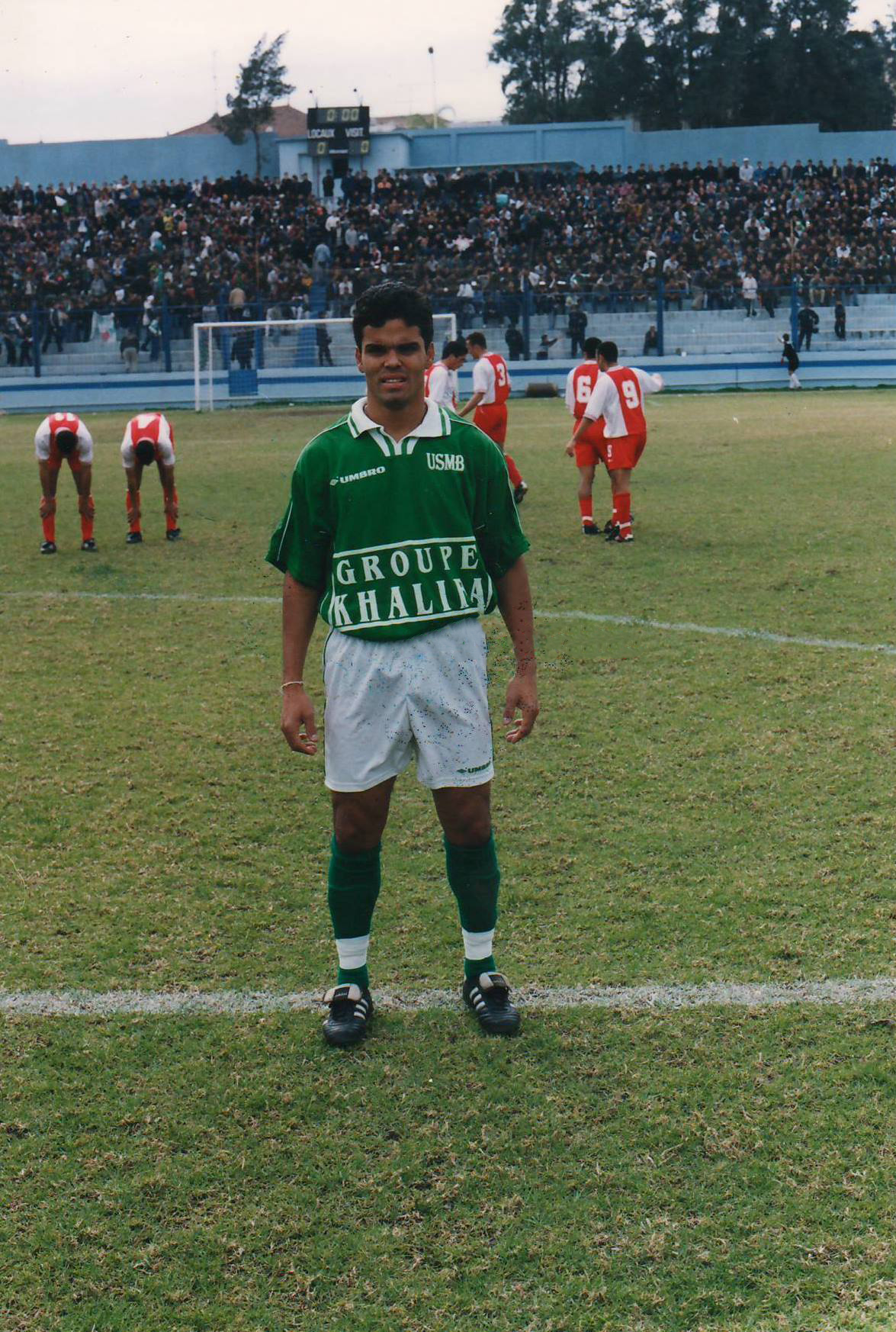
Marcelo Gonçalves de Oliveira.

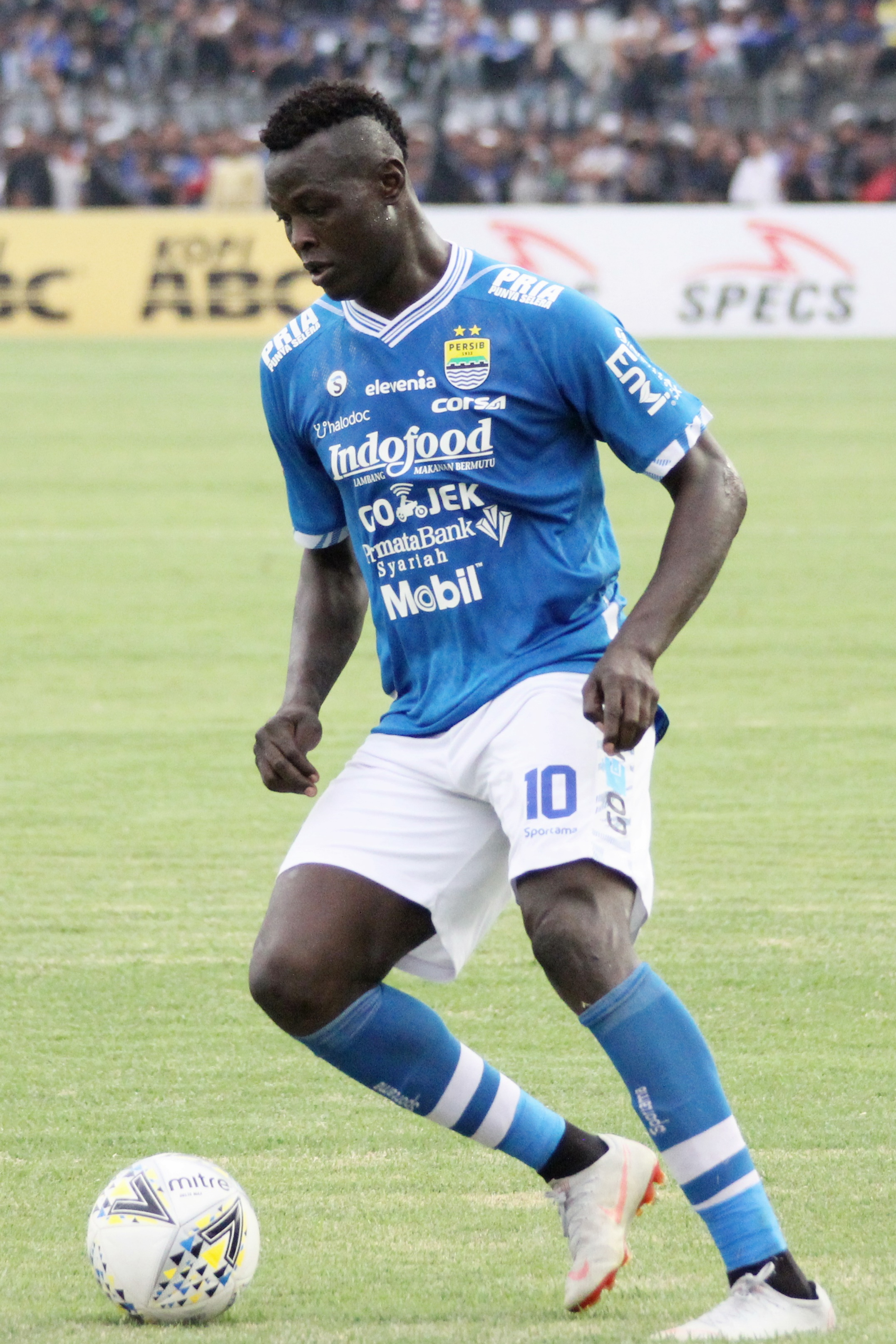
Ezechiel N'Douassel.

Bold Still playing competitive football in USM Blida. (Note: Since 2000–01 season the statistics of all the games, Statistics correct as of game 2020–21)

Name	Position	Inter career	Appearances	Goals	Notes
(Algeria) Miloud Abdaoui	MF	2007–08	5	0	
(Algeria) Nacim Abdelali	FW	2008–09	27	2	
(Algeria) Noureddine Abdellaoui	MF	2012–13	13	0	
(Algeria) Walid Abdenouri	MF	2013–14	7	0	
(Algeria) Merouane Abdouni	GK	2011–12	11	0	
(Algeria) Mohamed Abed Bahtsou	FW	2009–10	28	4	
(Algeria) Izzedine Abed	FW	2016–18	46	8	
(Algeria) Samir Achiche	MF	2016–17	5	0	
(Algeria) Sofiane Aibout	MF	2013–15	21	1	
(Algeria) Amine Aissa El Bey	FW	2015–19	73	3	
(Algeria) Fouad Aïssa	DF	2002–05	9	0	
(Algeria) Hakim Aït Mokhtar	DF	2000–03	73	5	
(Algeria) Ali Amiri	MF	2015–16	28	3	
(Algeria) Akram Alioua	DF	2021	2	0	
(Algeria) Hamza Aliouane	MF	2010–13	52	0	
(Algeria) Mustapha Fethi Aliouat	FW	2016–20	70	8	
(Algeria) Oussama Alili	GK	2019–21	16	0	
(Algeria) Mohamed Bachir Adraoui	DF	2019–20	14	0	
(Algeria) Farouk Allali	MF	2004–05	7	0	
(Algeria) Walid Allati	DF	2013–14	5	0	
(Algeria) Salah Eddine Akkacha	DF	2021	9	0	
(Algeria) Abdelkader Amer-Yahia	FW	2014–15	5	0	
(Algeria) Ahmed Amrouche	DF	2001–02	9	0	
(Algeria) Rezki Amrouche	DF	2002–04	78	3	
(Algeria) Mohamed Aoun Seghir	DF	2000–06, 2007–08	102	2	
(Algeria) Mohamed Amine Aoudia	FW	2021	2	1	
(Algeria) Redouane Bachiri	DF	2005–06	14	2	
(Algeria) Mohamed Badache	FW	2000–05	122	32	
(Algeria) Billal Baïd	MF	2000–02	10	2	
(Algeria) Bakir	DF	2000–02	46	3	
(Algeria) Ayoub Baouche	MF	2007–08	10	0	
(Algeria) Abdekader Bedrane	DF	2013–18	99	8	
(Algeria) Rachid Behilil	MF	2007–08	13	0	
(Algeria) Mohamed Belahouel	DF	2008–10	47	2	
(Algeria) El Hadi Belaid	DF	2016–18	59	1	
(Algeria) Ayache Belaoued	MF	2005–08	71	4	
(Algeria) Mouloud Belatrèche	MF	2003–04	13	1	
(Algeria) Kaddour Beldjilali	MF	2010–11	7	1	
(Algeria) Mohammed Ishaq Belhadj	DF	2013–15	49	0	
(Algeria) Mohamed Islam Belhadj	MF	2017–21	75	1	
(Algeria) Walid Belhamri	FW	2012–13	22	1	
(Algeria) Khalfallah Belhaoua	DF	2013–16	77	1	
(Algeria) Abdenour Belkheir	FW	2010–12	55	6	
(Algeria) Mokhtar Belkhiter	DF	2010–13	82	2	
(Algeria) Farid Belmellat	GK	2000–01	2	0	
(Algeria) Sid Ahmed Belouahem	DF	2001–08	146	4	
(Algeria) Mohamed Beloufa	MF	2008–09	8	0	
(Algeria) Aziz Benabdi	MF	2013–15	46	3	
(Algeria) Ishak Benrekia	MF	2021	1	0	
(Algeria) Abdenacer Bensaci	MF	2021	2	0	
(Algeria) Miloud Benamara	DF	2008–09	13	0	
(Algeria) Youcef Benamara	DF	2015–16	28	0	
(Algeria) Lokmane Benamar	FW	2019–20	6	1	
(Algeria) Ishak Benameur	DF	2008–09	1	0	
(Algeria) Mourad Benayad	FW	2012–13	7	0	
(Algeria) Abdelkader Benayada	DF	2004–2007, 2014–16	142	1	
(Algeria) Tarek Bendiaf	MF	2013–17	80	6	
(Algeria) Zoheir Bendida	DF	2005–06	5	0	
(Algeria) Reda Benhadj	DF	2000–02	5	0	
(Algeria) Chihab Eddine Benhebil	FW	2021	3	0	
(Algeria) Zakaria Benhocine	MF	2012–14	43	0	
(Algeria) Islam Benhocine	MF	2019–	4	0	
(Algeria) Nidhal Benichnacha	DF	2017–21	57	2	
(Algeria) Nadir Benloucif	MF	2009–12	77	1	
(Algeria) Mounir Benmeddour	GK	2012–13	7	0	
(Algeria) Hichem Benmeghit	FW	2008–09	11	1	
(Algeria) Billal Abdessamed Bennaceur	DF	2012–14	51	1	
(Algeria) Nacer Bennemra	MF	2010–11	7	0	
(Algeria) Adlène Bensaïd	FW	2006–07	17	12	
(Algeria) Abdennaser Bensalem	DF	2013–14	3	0	
(Algeria) Samir Bentayeb	FW	2010–11	12	3	
(Algeria) Wassim Berber	GK	2008–09	1	0	
(Algeria) Amar Bertil	DF	2011–12	10	0	
(Algeria) Abdelmalek Bettouaf	MF	2003–06	32	0	
(Algeria) Faycal Bezari	GK	2000–01	1	0	
(Algeria) Abdelmalek Bitam	MF	2010–11	12	1	
(Algeria) Hichem Blidi	MF	2019–20	4	0	
(Algeria) Atmane Bouaoua	MF	2013–14	7	0	
(Algeria) Mohamed Bouanati	FW	2021	12	1	
(Algeria) Mohamed Riadh Bouchemit	DF	2018–20	24	0	
(Algeria) Abdellah Boudina	MF	2011–16	102	12	
(Algeria) Hadj Bouguèche	FW	2004–05	23	3	
(Algeria) Houssam Bouharbit	FW	2014–15	11	2	
(Algeria) Ilyes Bouheniche	DF	2016–18	36	0	
(Algeria) Bouhlit	MF	2000–01	3	0	
(Algeria) Samir Bouikni	GK	2011–12	5	0	
(Algeria) Khaled Boukacem	GK	2009–11	10	0	
(Algeria) Ayoub Boukert	MF	2014–15	6	1	
(Algeria) Ahmed Boulifa	GK	2004–05	8	0	
(Algeria) Mansour Boutabout	MF	2009–10	4	0	
(Algeria) Ahmed Boutagga	GK	2017–19	28	0	
(Algeria) Khalil Bouzit	FW	2018–19	6	0	
(Algeria) Bouzidi	DF	2021	2	0	
(Algeria) Salim Brahmi	MF	2014–19	78	2	
(Algeria) Lyes Brahimi	MF	2021	8	1	
(Algeria) Briki	DF	2000–01	14	0	
(Algeria) Faouzi Chadouli	MF	2008–09	5	0	
(Algeria) Hamid Chahloul	FW	2005–08	49	13	
(Algeria) Abdelghani Chaouaou	DF	2009–10	16	0	
(Algeria) Abdellah Chebira	DF	2005–11	130	5	
(Algeria) Chemseddine Chellali	FW	2007–08	13	2	
(Algeria) Mohamed Hichem Cherif	FW	2015–16	30	3	
(Algeria) Ismaïl Idriss Chkmam	DF	2019–20	7	0	
(Algeria) Mustapha Chenini	FW	2021–	9	1	
(Algeria) Aimen Dadsi	FW	2018–21	25	2	
(Algeria) Mehdi Defnoun	DF	2009–12	82	4	
(Algeria) Monsef Abdelaziz Dekhli	MF	2018–19	3	1	
(Algeria) Mohamed Deroukdal	DF	2007–08	10	0	
(Algeria) Smail Diss	CB	2001–08	200	20	
(Algeria) Abdelouahab Djahel	FW	2009–12	61	8	
(Algeria) Kacim Djahmoun	FW	2016–17	1	0	
(Algeria) Mahfoud Djeddou	MF	2001–03	21	0	
(Algeria) Boufeldja Djelti	FW	2019–20	2	0	
(Algeria) Antar Djemaouni	FW	2009–11	54	9	
(Algeria) Djender	MF	2000–01	6	0	
(Algeria) Younès Djeroudi	DF	2011–12	27	1	
(Algeria) Lamara Douicher	MF	2012–13	19	0	
(Algeria) Salim Drali	DF	2000–04	83	3	
(Algeria) Youcef El Houari	MF	2016–19	79	1	
(Algeria) Nour El Imam	MF	2016–20	41	5	
(Algeria) Youcef El Keboub	FW	2018–20	33	2	
(Algeria) Bouazza Feham	FW	2005–06	23	2	
(Algeria) Mounir Fekih	FW	2015–16	9	1	
(Algeria) Ouahid Fetahine	DF	2002–03	22	0	
(Algeria) Yassine Fortas	FW	2016–17	6	0	
(Algeria) Khaled Fouaz	MF	2008–09	7	0	
(Algeria) Samy Frioui	FW	2016–18	58	21	
(Algeria) Toufik Gacem	DF	2013–14	2	0	
(Algeria) Amar Galoul	FW	2001–02	9	0	
(Algeria) Samir Galoul	DF	2000–05	185	13	
(Algeria) Lounes Gaouaoui	GK	2010–11	27	0	
(Algeria) Oussama Gattal	DF	2017–19	51	1	
(Algeria) Houssam Eddine Ghacha	MF	2017–18	27	1	
(Algeria) Gherbi	DF	2021	4	0	
(Algeria) Mohamed Ghalem	GK	2008–10	36	0	
(Algeria) Tarek Ghoul	DF	2004–05	6	1	
(Algeria) Mustapha Gouaich	FW	2003–06	6	0	
(Algeria) Abdelouahab Guenifi	MF	2016–17	25	0	
(Algeria) Hamza Guessoum	MF	2009–10	12	1	
(Algeria) Mohamed Ismail Guezair	FW	2016–20	27	3	
(Algeria) Mohammed Zakaria Habchi	FW	2018–19	9	0	
(Algeria) Laid Haddou	FW	2011–13	12	2	
(Algeria) Abdelmalik Hadef	FW	2018–19	19	4	
(Algeria) Abdenour Hadiouche	FW	2016–17	18	0	
(Algeria) Mohamed Saâdi	MF	2008–09	17	0	
(Algeria) Nasser Hakkar	MF	2009–10	1	0	
(Algeria) Mohamed Riadh Hamida	DF	2018–19	17	0	
(Algeria) Cheikh Hamidi	FW	2012–13	12	1	
(Algeria) Farès Hamiti	FW	2005–09, 2016–18	78	17	
(Algeria) Mohamed El Amine Hammia	MF	2010–14	93	19	
(Algeria) Abdesslam Hannane	GK	2021	8	0	
(Algeria) Mohamed Islam Haniched	FW	2021	11	2	
(Algeria) Abdelkader Harizi	MF	2009–11	47	8	
(Algeria) Billel Harkas	MF	2000–02, 2006–08	103	1	
(Algeria) Harnane	DF	2000–01	10	0	
(Algeria) Salah Hassani	FW	2020	3	0	
(Algeria) Rabah Hazi	DF	2007–08	21	1	
(Algeria) Riadh Hellou	DF	2016–20	32	0	
(Algeria) Bilel Herbache	MF	2005–2010, 2017–2021	187	18	
(Algeria) Hamza Heriat	MF	2015–16	26	0	
(Algeria) Mohamed Herida	DF	2012–13	24	4	
(Algeria) Okba Hezil	MF	2012–13	8	1	
(Algeria) Slimane Illoul	MF	2010–11	13	0	
(Algeria) Salim Ryad Kabla	MF	2011–12	10	0	
(Algeria) Mehdi Kacem	MF	2017–21	72	1	
(Algeria) Mohamed Kaïd	FW	2013–15	29	6	
(Algeria) Ibrahim Kebia	MF	2012–13	13	2	
(Algeria) Fateh Kerifali	FW	2011–13	38	8	
(Algeria) Mohamed Khaloufi	FW	2015–16	4	0	
(Algeria) Mohamed Khazrouni	DF	2000–04	76	3	
(Algeria) Ismail Khelladi	GK	2010–14	69	0	
(Algeria) Sabri Khellaf	MF	2009–10	7	1	
(Algeria) Sid Ali Khenifsi	DF	2001–07	63	0	
(Algeria) Abdelmoumen Kherbache	DF	2010–11	11	0	
(Algeria) Kamel Kherkhache	FW	1999–02	72	34	
(Algeria) Djilani Khïri	MF	2013–14	16	0	
(Algeria) Mohamed Amine Khiter	FW	2010–11	8	0	
(Algeria) Amine Kraimia	MF	2009–10	20	0	
(Algeria) Abdennour Krebazza	DF	2000–02	50	0	
(Algeria) Labassi	DF	2021–	7	0	
(Algeria) Nehdim Lahocine	MF	2012–14	9	2	
(Algeria) Abdelkader Laifaoui	DF	2015–18	69	2	
(Algeria) Lounis Lanseur	DF	2010–11	5	0	
(Algeria) Ibrahim Ledraâ	FW / DF	2011–13, 2021	32	11	
(Algeria) Oussama Litim	GK	2013–15	44	0	
(Algeria) Sofiane Louz	FW	2009–10	5	0	
(Algeria) Nadjib Maaziz	DF	2018–19	10	1	
(Algeria) Said Mabrek	MF	2012–13	6	0	
(Algeria) Abderrahmane Mahammedi	DF	2013–19	47	0	
(Algeria) Hichem Manaâ	MF	2011–13	25	1	
(Algeria) Kamel Maouche	FW	2002–04	53	3	
(Algeria) Tayeb Maroci	MF	2005–2008, 2014–16	116	2	
(Algeria) Ali Meçabih	FW	2003–05	8	1	
(Algeria) Mohamed Nacer Medjoudj	DF	2006–07	8	0	
(Algeria) Abdelkrim Meguenni	MF	2010–11	8	0	
(Algeria) Rachid Mehaia	MF	2012–13	23	0	
(Algeria) Mohamed Mehdaoui	FW	2002–06, 2008–09	114	11	
(Algeria) Mekideche	FW	2000–01	2	0	
(Algeria) Mouaouia Meklouche	FW	2013–15	15	2	
(Algeria) Mustapha Melika	MF	2011–15	114	29	
(Algeria) Chems Eddine Merchla	FW	2021	2	0	
(Algeria) Oussama Mesfar	FW	2015–16	8	0	
(Algeria) Merouane Messai	GK	2001–02	5	0	
(Algeria) Hocine Metref	MF	2021	3	1	
(Algeria) Sid Ali Mezhoud	DF	2013–14	1	0	
(Algeria) Abdelkader Meziane	DF	2005–09	26	0	
(Algeria) Lyes Meziane	GK	2016–18	37	0	
(Algeria) Hichem Mokhtar	FW	2010–12	28	2	
(Algeria) Ali Moumen	MF	2005–06	11	0	
(Algeria) Mohamed Naâmani	DF	2010–14	89	5	
(Algeria) Taïmmy Negrèche	FW	2009–10	1	0	
(Algeria) Abdelhak Amine Nemeur	DF	2018–19	13	0	
(Algeria) Fethi Noubli	FW	2013–16	55	21	
(Algeria) Osmane	MF	2013–14	16	0	
(Algeria) El Hadi Fayçal Ouadah	GK	2003–2008, 2014–2020	140	0	
(Algeria) Abderrezak Choukri Ouail	MF	2013–14	12	0	
(Algeria) Hocine Ouamri	DF	2018–20	30	3	
(Algeria) Houssam Ould Zmirli	DF	2008–09	5	0	
(Algeria) Hamza Ounnas	MF	2007–08, 2014–16	44	1	
(Algeria) Nasreddine Oussaad	DF	2008–11, 2014–15	45	1	
(Algeria) Omar Ousmail	MF	2019–20	13	0	
(Algeria) Nouri Ouznadji	FW	2012–13	28	9	
(Algeria) Djamel Rabti	FW	2011–12, 2016–17	58	8	
(Algeria) Karim Rachedi	FW	2021	21	4	
(Algeria) Aboubaker Rebih	MF	2003–08	113	8	
(Algeria) Redouane Rebih	FW	2006–08	7	0	
(Algeria) Mouad Redjem	FW	2018–20	38	4	
(Algeria) Ali Rial	DF	2017–18	9	0	
(Algeria) Malik Rouag	MF	2010–11	12	1	
(Algeria) Benhalima Rouane	FW	2002–05	90	8	
(Algeria) Mohamed Saâdi	MF	2008–09	17	0	
(Algeria) Salah Samadi	GK	2000–08	202	0	
(Algeria) Reda Bensaïd Sayah	FW	2014–15	14	3	
(Algeria) Touhami Sebie	DF	2009–11	30	0	
(Algeria) Lotfi Walid Sebai	DF	2021	11	0	
(Algeria) Abderrahmane Sellami	MF	2018–20	12	1	
(Algeria) Benziane Senouci	DF	2008–09	30	0	
(Algeria) Zine El Abidine Si Ahmed	DF	2011–12	7	0	
(Algeria) Ibrahim Si Ammar	MF	2017–18	27	4	
(Algeria) Chemseddine Slimani	GK	2021	1	0	
(Algeria) Tababouchet		2000–02	5	3	
(Algeria) Madjid Tahraoui	FW	2004–06	32	2	
(Algeria) Mohamed Abdou Taieb Solimane	MF	2009–10, 2016–21	127	2	
(Algeria) Taibi	FW	2021	2	0	
(Algeria) Mohamed Abdelaziz Tchikou	FW	2018–2021	16	1	
(Algeria) Djilali Terbah	DF	2009–10	1	0	
(Algeria) Hacene Tilbi	FW	2009–13	53	4	
(Algeria) Touafria	FW	2021	1	0	
(Algeria) Hamza Islam Touahri	MF	2010–13	10	1	
(Algeria) Hassane Toual	GK	2008–09	28	0	
(Algeria) Mohamed Nadjib Touati	FW	2018–20	14	3	
(Algeria) Farid Touil	FW	2004–06	43	12	
(Algeria) Zakaria Tsamda	DF	2013–17	74	2	
(Algeria) Mohamed Yaghni	DF	2010–11	18	0	
(Algeria) Yanis Youcef	MF	2010–11	9	0	
(Algeria) Zakaria Zaitri	DF	2018–21	33	0	
(Algeria) Hamza Zamim	GK	2012–13	2	0	
(Algeria) Chouaïb Zalami	DF	2021	3	0	
(Algeria) Hamza Zeddam	DF	2017–18	6	0	
(Algeria) Abderaouf Zemmouchi	DF	2005–11, 2014–15	148	6	
(Algeria) Omar Zenati	GK	2008–09	2	0	
(Algeria) Youcef Zerguine	FW	2016–19	28	11	
(Algeria) Mohamed Amine Zidane	DF	2014–15	10	0	
(Algeria) Zoubir Zmit	MF	2003–2005, 2006–08	107	9	
(Algeria) Billal Zouani	FW	2000–08	178	41	
(Brazil) Marcelo Gonçalves de Oliveira	MF	2000–02	50	4	
(Burkina Faso) Mamadou Tall	DF	2004–07	68	2	
(Burkina Faso) Amadou Tidiane Tall	MF	2003–06	28	0	
(Burkina Faso) Harouna Traoré	MF	2004–05	6	0	
(Cameroon) Jean-Philippe Belinga	FW	2008–09	9	0	
(Cameroon) Hervé Guillaume Boumsong	DF	2008–10	31	0	
(Cameroon) Ghislain Chameni	MF	2008–09	13	0	
(Cameroon) Jude Kongnyuy	FW	2008–09	9	0	
(Algeria) Mohamed Rabah Kouider	MF	2021–	8	1	
(Algeria) Koudjar	MF	2021	2	0	
(Chad) Ezechiel N'Douassel	FW	2008–10	33	14	
(Ghana) Mussah Awudu	MF	2002–03	15	0	
(Ghana) Hassan Masaudu	FW	2002–03	16	0	
(Guinea) Ibrahim Khalil Sylla	FW	2015–16	26	3	
(Nigeria) Mohamed Manga	MF	2000–01	2	0	
(Nigeria) Ogochukwu Obiakor	FW	2007–08	2	0	
(Republic of the Congo) Wilfried Urbain Elvis Endzanga	FW	2005–08	73	16	
(Togo) Souleymane Dicko	FW	2005–06	4	0	

== List of All-time appearances ==
This List of All-time appearances for USM Blida contains football players who have played for USM Blida and have managed to accrue 100 or more appearances.

Bold Still playing competitive football in USM Blida.

#	Name	Position	Career	League	Cup	Arab	TOTAL							
#	Name	Position	Career	League	Cup	Arab	TOTAL	1	(Algeria) Salah Samadi	GK	2000–08	184	18	202
2	(Algeria) Smaïl Diss	CB	2001–08	181	19		200							
3	(Algeria) Bilel Herbache	DM	2005–2010, 2017–21	170	17	0	187							
4	(Algeria) Billal Zouani	LW / RW	2000–08	161	16		177							
5	(Algeria) Abderaouf Zemmouchi	CB	2005–11, 2014–15	133	15	0	148							
6	(Algeria) Sid Ahmed Belouahem	DF	2001–08	137	10		147							
7	(Algeria) Samir Galoul	CB	2000–05	131	11		142							
8	(Algeria) Abdelkader Benayada	CB	2004–2007, 2014–16	130	12	0	142							
9	(Algeria) El Hadi Fayçal Ouadah	GK	2003–2008, 2014–	123	16	0	140							
10	(Algeria) Abdellah Chebira	LB	2005–11	115	15	0	130							
11	(Algeria) Mohamed Abdou Taieb Solimane	MF	2009–2010, 2016–21	117	10	0	127							
12	(Algeria) Mohamed Badache	FW	2000–05	110	12		122							
13	(Algeria) Tayeb Maroci	MD	2005–2008, 2014–16	106	10	0	116							
14	(Algeria) Mohamed Mehdaoui	MF	2002–06, 2008–09	105	9		114							
15	(Algeria) Mustapha Melika	MF	2011–15	106	8	0	114							
16	(Algeria) Aboubaker Rebih	LW	2003–08	106	7		113							
17	(Algeria) Zoubir Zmit	MF	2003–2005, 2007–08	97	12		109							
18	(Algeria) Billel Harkas	MF	2000–02, 2006–08	88	14		102							
19	(Algeria) Mohamed Aoun Seghir	MF	2000–06, 2007–08	92	10		102							
20	(Algeria) Abdellah Boudina	MF	2011–16	92	10	0	102							

== Players from USM Blida to Europe ==
Player	Pos	Club	Season	League	Transfer fee	Source
(Algeria) fr:Mohamed Bernou	MF	Montpellier HSC	1948–49	(France) Ligue 1	-	
(Algeria) Kaddour Bensamet	FW	fr:Stade français-Red Star	1949–50	(France) Ligue 1	-	
(Algeria) fr:Abdelkader Mazouz	FW	LB Châteauroux / Nîmes Olympique	1951–52 / 1956–57	(France) Ligue 1	-	
(Algeria) fr:Ahmed Guerrache	FW	UMS Montélimar	1964–65	(France)		
(Algeria) Samy Frioui	FW	Athlitiki Enosi Larissa F.C.	2018–19	Super League Greece	Free transfer	

== Award winners ==
(Whilst playing for USM Blida)

Top goalscorers in Algerian Ligue 1

- (Algeria) Kamel Kherkhache (13 goals) – 2001–02
