= 2003–04 USM Blida season =

USM Blida
2003–04 season
- Chairman: Mohamed Zaïm
- Head coach: Younès Ifticen (5W 2D 7L) (until 19 November 2003); Dan Anghelescu (8W 8D 10L) (from 19 November 2003) (until 30 May 2004)
- Stadium: Mustapha Tchaker Stadium
- National 1: 7th
- Algerian Cup: Round of 32
- Top goalscorer: League: Mohamed Badache (14 goals); All: Mohamed Badache (16 goals)
Home colours	Away colours

In the 2003–04 season, USM Blida is competing in the National 1 for the 19th season, as well as the Algerian Cup. They will be competing in Ligue 1, and the Algerian Cup.

== Competitions ==
=== Overview ===
Competition	Record								Started round	Final position / round	First match	Last match
Competition	G	W	D	L	GF	GA	GD	Win %	Started round	Final position / round	First match	Last match
National 1	30	11	8	11	34	29	+5	36.67	—N/a	7th	14 August 2003	24 May 2004
Algerian Cup	2	1	0	1	2	2	+0	50.00	Round of 64	Round of 32	5 February 2004	22 March 2004
Arab Champions League	8	1	2	5	7	15	−8	12.50	First round	Second round	30 September 2003	16 March 2004
Total	40	13	10	17	43	46	−3	32.50				

Updated to match played 4 July 2020
Source: Competitions

=== National ===
==== League table ====
Pos	Team	Pld	W	D	L	GF	GA	GD	Pts	Qualification or relegation
5	MC Alger	30	14	5	11	35	34	+1	47	2004-05 Arab Champions League
6	MC Oran	30	12	8	10	34	33	+1	44	2005 CAF Confederation Cup
7	USM Blida	30	11	8	11	34	29	+5	41	
8	ASO Chlef	30	9	13	8	19	22	−3	40	
9	CA Bordj Bou Arreridj	30	10	8	12	32	28	+4	38	

Updated to match(es) played on 9 October 2014. Source: DZFoot
Rules for classification: 1) points; 2) goal difference; 3) number of goals scored.

=== Results summary ===
Overall								Home						Away					
Pld	W	D	L	GF	GA	GD	Pts	W	D	L	GF	GA	GD	W	D	L	GF	GA	GD
30	11	8	11	34	29	+5	41	9	4	2	25	8	+17	2	4	9	9	21	−12

Last updated: June 2004.
Source: Competitive matches

=== Results by round ===
Round	1	2	3	4	5	6	7	8	9	10	11	12	13	14	15	16	17	18	19	20	21	22	23	24	25	26	27	28	29	30
Ground	H	H	A	H	A	H	A	H	A	H	A	H	A	H	A	A	A	H	A	H	A	H	A	H	A	H	A	H	A	H
Result	W	W	L	D	L	L	L	W	D	W	L	W	L	W	L	L	L	D	D	W	D	D	W	D	W	W	L	W	D	L
Position	2	1	4	4	7	10	11	9	9	8	9	9	9	8	10	11	11	12	12	12	11	13	8	10	8	7	8	7	7	7

Updated to match(es) played on 27 May 2004. Source: Competitive matches
A = Away; H = Home; W = Win; D = Draw; L = Loss

=== Matches ===
Win Draw Loss

14 August 2003 Round 1	USM Blida	1–0	CA Batna	Blida
	Kamel Maouche 18'; Zoubir Zmit (yellow card) 45'	Report	(yellow card) 12' Zine El Abidine; (yellow card) 39' Frioua Réda Ârâr; (yellow card) 67' Hacène Ghenaia	Stadium: Stade Mustapha Tchaker; Attendance: 5,000; Referee: Touati Djaballah

21 August 2003 Round 2	USM Blida	2–0	ASO Chlef	Blida
	Mohamed Badache 5'; Billal Zouani (yellow card) 14'; Kamel Maouche (yellow card) 35'; Rezki Amrouche (yellow card) 53'; Ali Meçabih 68'	Report	(yellow card) 29' Bencherki Nacef; (yellow card) 29' El Ghali Belahouel; (yellow card) 55' Karim Ali Hadji	Stadium: Stade Mustapha Tchaker; Attendance: 5, 000; Referee: Samir Boubakour

28 August 2003 Round 3	RC Kouba	1–0	USM Blida	Kouba
	Hassen Habib (yellow card) 20'; Nabil Hamouda 35' (free-kick); Khalil Boukedjane (yellow card) 46'; Hadj Bouguèche (yellow card) 72'; Jean-Michel Gnonka (yellow card) 89'	Report	Smaïl Diss (yellow card); Kamel Maouche (yellow card) 23' (yellow-red card) 90+2'; Rezki Amrouche (yellow card) 69'	Stadium: Stade Omar Benhaddad; Referee: Mohamed Khelifi

2 September 2003 Round 4	USM Blida	2–2	CR Belouizdad	Blida
	Benhalima Rouane 18'; Zoubir Zmit 66'	Report	Mounir Dob 6'; Anwar Boudjakdji 24'	Stadium: Stade Mustapha Tchaker; Referee: Mohamed Amine Benaissa

11 September 2003 Round 6	USM Blida	0–1	US Chaouia	Blida
		Report	Bachir Boudjelid 4'	Stadium: Stade Mustapha Tchaker; Attendance: 5.000; Referee: Redouane Mehidi

18 September 2003 Round 7	JS Kabylie	2–1	USM Blida	Tizi Ouzou
	Nassim Hamlaoui 21'; Farouk Belkaid 55'	Report	Mohamed Badache 44'	Stadium: 1 November 1954 Stadium; Attendance: 21.000; Referee: Mohamed Benouza

10 October 2003 Round 8	USM Blida	3–0	WA Tlemcen	Blida
	Benhalima Rouane 12'; Abdelmalek Bettouaf 25'; Mohamed Badache 51'; Billal Zouani (penalty missed) 87'	Report		Stadium: Stade Mustapha Tchaker; Attendance: 0 Referee: Fouad Djerboua

24 October 2003 Round 10	USM Blida	3–0	USM Annaba	Blida
	Mohamed Badache 50'; Abdelmalek Bettouaf 63'; Mohamed Mehdaoui 90'	Report		Stadium: Stade Mustapha Tchaker; Attendance: 10.000; Referee: Touati Djaballah

30 October 2003 Round 11	JSM Béjaïa	3–0	USM Blida	Béjaïa
	Fouad Naceri 16', 42'; Nassim Dehouche 90'	Report		Stadium: Maghrebi Unity Stadium; Attendance: 8.000; Referee: Farouk Ouchène

17 November 2003 Round 13	ES Sétif	3–0	USM Blida	Sétif
	Réda Bendriss 50'; Laïd Belhamel 85'; Djallal Achacha 90+4'	Report		Stadium: Stade 8 Mai 1945; Attendance: 25.000; Referee: Houari Belkacem

20 November 2003 Round 14	USM Blida	2–0	MC Oran	Blida
	Mohamed Khazrouni 62'; Mohamed Mehdaoui 73'	Report		Stadium: Stade Mustapha Tchaker; Referee: Mohamed Amine Benaissa

24 November 2003 Round 5	USM Alger	1–0	USM Blida	Algiers
	Hocine Achiou 58'	Report		Stadium: Omar Hamadi Stadium; Attendance: 4.000; Referee: Mohamed Khelifi

1 December 2003 Round 9	NA Hussein Dey	0–0	USM Blida	Algiers
		Report		Stadium: August 20, 1955 Stadium; Referee: Mohamed Haddada

4 December 2003 Round 15	CA Bordj Bou Arréridj	3–1	USM Blida	Bordj Bou Arréridj
	Zoheir Khedhara 26'; Saadeddine Maidi 44'; Jean-Paul Yontcha 51'	Report	Mohamed Badache 88'	Stadium: August 20, 1955 Stadium; Referee: Mohamed Abdessamad

8 December 2003 Round 12	USM Blida	2–1	MC Alger	Blida
	Mohamed Badache 5', 74'	Report	Farès Djabelkheir 72'	Stadium: Stade Mustapha Tchaker; Referee: Messaoud Kadri

29 December 2003 Round 16	CA Batna	1–0	USM Blida	Batna
	Abdelhamid Benrabah 71'	Report		Stadium: Mustapha Seffouhi Stadium; Referee: Mohamed Benouza

8 January 2003 Round 17	ASO Chlef	1–0	USM Blida	Chlef
	Abdelmadjid Tahraoui 51'			Stadium: Mohamed Boumezrag Stadium; Attendance: 5.000; Referee: Mohamed Ould Abdellah

30 January 2004 Round 18	USM Blida	0–0	RC Kouba	Blida
				Stadium: Stade Mustapha Tchaker; Attendance: 5.000; Referee: Houari Belkacem

9 February 2004 Round 19	CR Belouizdad	1–1	USM Blida	Algiers
	Yacine Slatni 84'		Benhalima Rouane 60'	Stadium: August 20, 1955 Stadium; Attendance: 4.000; Referee: Mohamed Khelifi

12 February 2004 Round 20	USM Blida	1–0	USM Alger	Blida
	Mohamed Badache 72' (penalty missed) 75'			Stadium: Stade Mustapha Tchaker; Attendance: 30.000; Referee: Redouane Mehidi

19 February 2004 Round 21	US Chaouia	0–0	USM Blida	Oum El Bouaghi
				Stadium: Stade Hassouna Zerdani

8 March 2004 Round 22	USM Blida	0–0	JS Kabylie	Blida
				Stadium: Stade Mustapha Tchaker; Referee: Mohamed Abdessamad

12 March 2004 Round 24	USM Blida	0–0	NA Hussein Dey	Blida
				Stadium: Stade Mustapha Tchaker; Attendance: 10.000; Referee: Said Benamara

26 March 2004 Round 23	WA Tlemcen	0–1	USM Blida	Tlemcen
			Mohamed Badache 47'	Stadium: Stade Akid Lotfi; Referee: Farouk Ouchène

1 April 2004 Round 25	USM Annaba	2–3	USM Blida	Annaba
	Adel El Hadi 28', 75'		Billal Zouani 26', 54'; Mohamed Badache 63'	Stadium: May 19, 1956 Stadium; Attendance: 20.000; Referee: Houari Belkacem

19 April 2004 Round 26	USM Blida	5–1	JSM Béjaïa	Blida
	Benhalima Rouane 11', 70'; Mohamed Badache 45'; Smaïl Diss 79'; Mohamed Badache 85'		Rafik Khennouf 48'	Stadium: Stade Mustapha Tchaker

3 May 2004 Round 27	MC Alger	2–1	USM Blida	Algiers
	Mounir Amrane 50'; Mourad Fodhili 90'		Mohamed Badache 66'	Stadium: Omar Hamadi Stadium; Referee: Fouad Djerboua

10 May 2004 Round 28	USM Blida	3–1	ES Sétif	Blida
	Salim Drali 21'; Kamel Maouche 41'; Zoubir Zmit 82'		Fares Fellahi 26'	Stadium: Stade Mustapha Tchaker; Referee: Touati Djaballah

20 May 2004 Round 29	MC Oran	1–1	USM Blida	Oran
	Bouabdellah Daoud 40'		Smaïl Diss 67'	Stadium: Ahmed Zabana Stadium; Referee: Abdelhamid Aouiti

24 May 2004 Round 30	USM Blida	1–2	CA Bordj Bou Arréridj	Blida
	Mohamed Badache 86'		Brahim Boutine 17'; Farid Belayadi 41'	Stadium: Stade Mustapha Tchaker; Referee: Mohamed Ould Abdellah

== Algerian Cup ==
5 February 2004 Round of 64	USM Blida	2–1	MSP Batna	Bordj Bou Arréridj
	Samadi (yellow card) 20'; Galoul (yellow card) 80'; Rebih 75'; Diss 99'	Report	Bouras 78'	Stadium: August 20, 1955 Stadium; Referee: Bouhadjar, Aribi, Rebaï
Note: Lineup for USM Blida - Samadi, Diss, Amrouche, Galoul, Belouaham, Zmit, Khazrouni (Rebih 68'), Bettouaf (Rouane 66'), Mehdaoui, Maouche, Badache - Coach: Anghelescu

22 March 2004 Round of 32	USM Blida	0–1	MC Oran	Chlef
	Drali (yellow card); Badache (yellow card)	Report	Daoud B. (yellow card); Zohir Bendida 90+1' (yellow card)	Stadium: Mohamed Boumezrag Stadium; Referee: Boumaâza, Athamnia, Feddaoui
Note: Lineup for USM Blida - Samadi - Drali, Amrouche (cap), Diss, Belouahem - Bettouaf (Rouane 33’), Tall, Zmit, Maouche - Mehdaoui, Badache. Entraîneur : Anghelescu.

== Arab Champions League ==
=== First round ===
30 September 2003 First leg	MAS Fez (Morocco)	1–3	(Algeria) USM Blida	Fez, Morocco
16:00	Ahmed Bahja 15'	Report	Mohamed Badache 5'; Kamel Maouche 48'; Rouane Benhalima 88'	Stadium: Fez; Referee: (Saudi Arabia) Nasser Hamdane
Note: Lineup for USM Blida – Coach: Younès Ifticène

15 October 2003 Second leg	USM Blida (Algeria)	0–1	(Morocco) MAS Fez	Blida, Algeria
18:30	Sid Ali Khenifsi (yellow card) 70'; Salim Drali (yellow card) 71'	Report	Bafaou Faou 30' (yellow card) ?' (yellow-red card) 49'; Hobi (yellow card) 75'	Stadium: Mustapha Tchaker; Referee: (Palestine) Abou El-Ach
Note: Lineup for USM Blida – Samadi, Amrouche, Diss, Galoul, Drali, Khenifsi, Zmit, Bettouaf (Bellatrèche 46'), Maouche, Badache (Zouani 76'), Benhalima (Mehdaoui 89') Coach: Younès Ifticène

=== Second round ===
5 November 2003 1	Espérance de Tunis (Tunisia)	2–1	(Algeria) USM Blida	Tunis (Tunisia)
20:30	Badra 40'; Binié 68'; Thabet (yellow card) 52'; Mkadmi (yellow card) 67'; Mogaâdi (yellow card) 90+1'	Report	30' Badache; (yellow card) 36' Diss; (yellow card) 67' Rouane; (yellow card) 77' Amrouche	Stadium: Stade Chedly Zouiten; Referee: (Syria) Bassel Hajjar
Note: Lineup for USM Blida - Samadi, Khenifsi, Belouahem, Diss, Amrouche (Aïssa 84'), Galloul, Badache, Zmit, Rouane, Maouche, Belatrèche (Zouani 46') - Coach: Younès Ifticène

12 December 2003 2	USM Blida (Algeria)	2–2	(Tunisia) CS Sfaxien	Blida (Algeria)
16:00	Maouche 42'; Mehdaoui 90+2'; Belatrèche (yellow card) 44'	Report	9' Tarik El Taib; 58' Haïkil; (yellow card) 22' Djerbi; (yellow card) 74' Boudjehane; (yellow card) 84' Ramzi	Stadium: Stade Mustapha Tchaker; Referee: Mohamed Abdellah
Note: Lineup for USM Blida - Samadi, Belouahem, Drali (Zouani 45'), Galloul, Diss, Khazrouni, Khenifsi, Belatrèche (Mehdaoui 69'), Maouche, Badache, Rouane - Coach: Younès Ifticène

24 December 2003 3	Zamalek SC (Egypt)	1–1	(Algeria) USM Blida	Cairo (Egypt)
16:00	Sameh Youcef 56'	Report	Diss 83'	Stadium: Cairo International Stadium; Referee: (Kuwait) Khaled Abel
Note: Lineup for USM Blida - Samadi, Amrouche, Belouahem, Diss; Maouche, Khazrouni (c), Zmit; Zouani (Rouane Benhalima), Belatrèche, Mehdaoui, Badache - Coach: Dan Anghelescu

17 February 2004 4	CS Sfaxien (Tunisia)	1–0	(Algeria) USM Blida	Sfax (Tunisia)
17:30	Zobeir Al-Safi 35'	Report		Stadium: Stade Taïeb Mhiri
Note: Lineup for USM Blida - - Coach: Dan Anghelescu

3 March 2004 5	USM Blida (Algeria)	0–2	(Egypt) Zamalek SC	Blida (Algeria)
16:00		Report	Abdel-Halim Ali 5'; Ahmed Saleh 83'	Stadium: Stade Mustapha Tchaker
Note: Lineup for USM Blida - Samadi, Amrouche, Belouahem, Diss, Galloul (c); Maouche, Zmit; Benhalima, Belatrèche, Mehdaoui, Badache - Coach: Dan Anghelescu

16 March 2004 6	USM Blida (Algeria)	0–5	(Tunisia) Espérance de Tunis	Blida (Algeria)
18:00		Report	25' Zaïem; 45' Zitouni; 81' Jomaâ; 89' Harbaoui; 90' Mnari	Stadium: Stade Mustapha Tchaker
Note: Lineup for USM Blida - Coach: Dan Anghelescu

Team	Pld	W	D	L	GF	GA	GD	Pts	ZSC	CSS	EST	USMB
(Egypt) Zamalek SC	6	4	1	1	11	5	+6	13		0–2	3–0	1–1
(Tunisia) CS Sfaxien	6	3	1	2	9	7	+2	10	1–3		0–1	1–0
(Tunisia) Espérance de Tunis	6	3	0	3	10	9	+1	9	1–2	1–3		2–1
(Algeria) USM Blida	6	0	2	4	4	13	−9	2	0–2	2–2	0–5	

Source: Arab Champions' League 2003/04

== Squad information ==
=== Playing statistics ===
No.	Pos	Nat	Player	Total		League		Algerian Cup		Arab Champions League	
No.	Pos	Nat	Player	Apps	Goals	Apps	Goals	Apps	Goals	Apps	Goals
Goalkeepers
1	GK	(Algeria) ALG	Salah Mohamed Samadi	31	0	29	0	2	0	.	0
24	GK	(Algeria) ALG	El Hadi Fayçal Ouadah	3	0	3	0	0	0	.	0
25	GK	(Algeria) ALG	Mohamed Haniched	1	0	1	0	0	0	.	0
Defenders
5	DF	(Algeria) ALG	Smaïl Diss	28	4	26	2	2	1	.	1
12	DF	(Algeria) ALG	Samir Galoul	27	0	26	0	1	0	.	0
4	DF	(Algeria) ALG	Rezki Amrouche	27	0	25	0	2	0	.	0
17	DF	(Algeria) ALG	Sid Ahmed Belouahem	26	0	24	0	2	0	.	0
3	DF	(Algeria) ALG	Salim Drali	18	1	17	1	1	0	.	0
2	DF	(Algeria) ALG	Sid Ali Khenifsi	17	0	17	0	0	0	.	0
19	DF	(Algeria) ALG	Fouad Aïssa	3	0	3	0	0	0	.	0
Midfielders
6	MF	(Algeria) ALG	Zoubir Zmit	29	2	27	2	2	0	.	0
20	MF	(Algeria) ALG	Mohamed Khazrouni	14	1	13	1	1	0	.	0
8	MF	(Algeria) ALG	Mouloud Belatrèche	13	0	13	0	0	0	.	0
	MF	(Burkina Faso) BFA	Amadou Tidiane Tall	11	0	10	0	1	0	.	0
	MF	(Algeria) ALG	Farouk Allali	7	0	7	0	0	0	.	0
	MF	(Algeria) ALG	Mohamed Aoun Seghir	6	0	6	0	0	0	.	0
23	MF	(Algeria) ALG	Rabah Bouaroura	2	0	2	0	0	0	.	0
	MF	(Algeria) ALG	Bilel Herbache	1	0	1	0	0	0	.	0
Forwards
13	FW	(Algeria) ALG	Mohamed Badache	29	16	27	14	2	0	.	2
11	FW	(Algeria) ALG	Benhalima Rouane	28	7	26	6	2	0	.	1
18	FW	(Algeria) ALG	Mohamed Mehdaoui	26	3	24	2	2	0	.	1
10	FW	(Algeria) ALG	Kamel Maouche	24	4	22	2	2	0	.	2
22	FW	(Algeria) ALG	Aboubaker Rebih	22	1	20	0	2	1	.	0
7	FW	(Algeria) ALG	Billal Zouani	16	2	16	2	0	0	.	0
21	FW	(Algeria) ALG	Abdelmalek Bettouaf	13	2	11	2	2	0	.	0
	FW	(Algeria) ALG	Ali Meçabih	5	1	5	1	0	0	.	0
	FW	(Algeria) ALG	Mustapha Gouaïche	3	0	3	0	0	0	.	0
	FW	(Algeria) ALG	Khaled Garzou	2	0	2	0	0	0	.	0
		(Algeria) ALG	Saidi	1	0	1	0	0	0	.	0
		(Algeria) ALG	Lebib	1	0	1	0	0	0	.	0

=== Goalscorers ===
Includes all competitive matches. The list is sorted alphabetically by surname when total goals are equal.

No.	Nat.	Player	Pos.	L 1	AC	ACL	TOTAL
-	(Algeria)	Mohamed Badache	FW	14	0	2	16
-	(Algeria)	Benhalima Rouane	FW	5	0	1	6
-	(Algeria)	Kamel Maouche	FW	2	0	2	4
-	(Algeria)	Smaïl Diss	DF	2	1	1	4
-	(Algeria)	Mohamed Mehdaoui	FW	2	0	1	3
-	(Algeria)	Zoubir Zmit	MF	2	0	0	2
-	(Algeria)	Abdelmalek Bettouaf	FW	2	0	0	2
-	(Algeria)	Billal Zouani	FW	2	0	0	2
-	(Algeria)	Ali Meçabih	FW	1	0	0	1
-	(Algeria)	Mohamed Khazrouni	DF	1	0	0	1
-	(Algeria)	Salim Drali	DF	1	0	0	1
-	(Algeria)	Aboubaker Rebih	FW	0	1	0	1
Own Goals				0	0	0	0
Totals				34	2	7	43

=== Assists ===
No.	Nat.	Player	Pos.	L 1	AC	ACL	TOTAL
-	(Algeria)	Zoubir Zmit	MF	4			
-	(Algeria)	Sid Ahmed Belouahem	CB	4			
-	(Algeria)	Benhalima Rouane	FW	3			
-	(Algeria)	Mouloud Belatreche	DM	2			
-	(Algeria)	Mohamed Badache	FW	1			
-	(Algeria)	Samir Galoul	DF	1			
-	(Algeria)	Aboubaker Rebih	LW	1			
-	(Algeria)	Billal Zouani	FW	1			
-	(Algeria)	Mohamed Aoun Seghir	MF	1			
-	(Algeria)	Ali Meçabih	FW	1			

=== Clean sheets ===
Includes all competitive matches.

No.	Nat	Name	L 1	AC	ACL	TOTAL
	(Algeria)	Salah Samadi	12	0		11
	(Algeria)	El Hadi Fayçal Ouadah	1	0		1

== Transfers ==
=== In ===
Date	Pos	Player	To club	Transfer fee	Source
		(Algeria) Mustapha Gouaich	MC Oran		
		(Burkina Faso) Mamadou Tall	CS Grevenmacher		
		(Algeria) Mohamed Haniched	US Chaouia		
		(Algeria) Abdelmalek Bettouaf	WA Tlemcen		
		(Burkina Faso) Amadou Tall	EF Ouagadougou		
		(Algeria) Zoubir Zmit	RC Kouba		
		(Algeria) Aboubaker Rebih	USM Blida Youth		
		(Algeria) Mouloud Belatreche	JSM Bejaia		
		(Algeria) El Hadi Fayçal Ouadah	USM Blida Youth		

=== Out ===
Date	Pos	Player	To club	Transfer fee	Source
		(Algeria) Ali Meçabih	USM Alger		
		(Algeria) Ouahid Fetahine	JSM Béjaia		
		(Algeria) Mohamed Khazrouni	Retired		
