= 2004–05 USM Blida season =

USM Blida
2004–05 season
- Stadium: Stade Mustapha Tchaker
- Division 1: 6th
- Algerian Cup: Quarter-finals
- Top goalscorer: League: Farid Touil (9 goals); All: Farid Touil (10 goals)
Home colours	Away colours

In the 2004–05 season, USM Blida is competing in Division 1 for the 18th time, as well as the Algerian Cup. It is their 8th consecutive season in the top flight of Algerian football. They will be competing in Division 1 and the Algerian Cup.

== Squad list ==
Players and squad numbers last updated on 20 August 2004.
Note: Flags indicate national team as has been defined under FIFA eligibility rules. Players may hold more than one non-FIFA nationality.

No.	Nat.	Position	Name	Date of birth (age)	Signed from
Goalkeepers
	(Algeria)	GK	Salah Mohamed Samadi	16 September 1976 (aged 27)	(Algeria) JS Bordj Ménaïel
	(Algeria)	GK	Ahmed Boulifa	12 June 1980 (aged 24)	(Algeria) Youth system
	(Algeria)	GK	El Hadi Fayçal Ouadah	24 September 1983 (aged 20)	(Algeria) USM Alger
Defenders
	(Algeria)	CB	Smaïl Diss	2 December 1976 (aged 27)	(Algeria) ES Mostaganem
	(Algeria)	CB	Sid Ahmed Belouahem	26 August 1977 (aged 26)	(Algeria) NA Hussein Dey
	(Algeria)	CB	Samir Galoul	18 October 1976 (aged 27)	(Algeria) JS Bordj Ménaïel
	(Algeria)	LB	Tarek Ghoul	6 January 1975 (aged 29)	(Algeria) USM Alger
	(Algeria)	RB	Abdelkader Benayada	5 May 1982 (aged 22)	(Algeria) ASM Oran
	(Algeria)	RB	Zoheir Bendida	3 December 1977 (aged 26)	(Algeria) MC Oran
	(Burkina Faso)	CB	Mamadou Tall	4 December 1982 (aged 21)	(Luxembourg) CS Grevenmacher
	(Algeria)		Sid Ali Khenifsi	16 November 1980 (aged 23)	(Algeria) Youth system
	(Algeria)		Fouad Aissa	4 May 1978 (aged 26)	(Algeria) Youth system
Midfielders
	(Burkina Faso)		Amadou Tall	22 July 1975 (aged 29)	(Burkina Faso) EF Ouagadougou
	(Algeria)		Zoubir Zmit	11 June 1975 (aged 29)	(Algeria) RC Kouba
	(Algeria)		Mohamed Aoun Seghir	27 August 1983 (aged 20)	(Algeria) Youth system
	(Algeria)		Rabah Bouaroura	30 May 1983 (aged 21)	(Algeria) IRB Hadjout
	(Algeria)		Farouk Allali	9 February 1985 (aged 19)	(Algeria) Youth system
	(Burkina Faso)	AM	Harouna Traoré	31 December 1982 (aged 21)	(Burkina Faso) EF Ouagadougou
	(Algeria)	AM	Bilel Herbache	4 January 1986 (aged 18)	(Algeria) Youth system
	(Algeria)	LW	Aboubaker Rebih	18 December 1983 (aged 20)	(Algeria) Youth system
Forwards
	(Algeria)	ST	Ali Meçabih	2 April 1972 (aged 32)	(Algeria) USM Alger
	(Algeria)		Mohamed Mehdaoui	29 September 1979 (aged 24)	(Algeria) CA Bordj Bou Arreridj
	(Algeria)	ST	Billal Zouani	11 December 1969 (aged 34)	(Algeria) Youth system
	(Algeria)	ST	Mohamed Badache	15 October 1976 (aged 27)	(Algeria) ES Sétif
	(Algeria)	RW / CF	Benhalima Rouane	28 February 1979 (aged 25)	(Algeria) JSM Tiaret
	(Algeria)	ST	Abdelmadjid Tahraoui	24 February 1981 (aged 23)	(Algeria) ASO Chlef
	(Algeria)		Abdelmalek Bettouaf	16 September 1981 (aged 22)	(Algeria) WA Tlemcen
	(Algeria)		Khaled Garzou	9 August 1984 (aged 20)	(Algeria) Youth system
	(Algeria)	ST	Hadj Bouguèche	7 December 1983 (aged 20)	(Algeria) RC Kouba
	(Algeria)	ST	Farid Touil	10 December 1974 (aged 29)	(Algeria) US Chaouia

== Competitions ==
=== Overview ===
Competition	Record								Started round	Final position / round	First match	Last match
Competition	G	W	D	L	GF	GA	GD	Win %	Started round	Final position / round	First match	Last match
Division 1	30	11	9	10	36	29	+7	36.67	—N/a	6th	20 August 2004	13 June 2005
Algerian Cup	4	2	1	1	5	3	+2	50.00	Round of 64	Quarter-finals	6 January 2005	14 March 2005
Total	34	13	10	11	41	32	+9	38.24				

=== Division 1 ===
==== League table ====
Pos	Team	Pld	W	D	L	GF	GA	GD	Pts	Qualification or relegation
4	NA Hussein Dey	30	11	10	9	29	19	+10	43	Qualification for the 2006 CAF Confederation Cup
5	CA Bordj Bou Arreridj	30	10	13	7	32	25	+7	43	Qualification for the 2005–06 Arab Champions League
6	USM Blida	30	11	9	10	36	29	+7	42	
7	ASO Chlef	30	10	11	9	30	32	−2	41	Qualification for the 2006 CAF Confederation Cup
8	CS Constantine	30	11	7	12	33	42	−9	40	

Updated to match(es) played on 13 June 2005. Source: DZFoot
Rules for classification: 1) points; 2) head-to-head points; 3) head-to-head goal difference; 4) goal difference; 5) total goals; 6) fairplay ranking; 7) playoff.

==== Results summary ====
Overall								Home						Away					
Pld	W	D	L	GF	GA	GD	Pts	W	D	L	GF	GA	GD	W	D	L	GF	GA	GD
30	11	9	10	36	29	+7	42	8	5	2	25	11	+14	3	4	8	11	18	−7

Last updated: 13 June 2005.
Source: Competitive matches

==== Results by round ====
Round	1	2	3	4	5	6	7	8	9	10	11	12	13	14	15	16	17	18	19	20	21	22	23	24	25	26	27	28	29	30
Ground	H	A	H	A	H	A	H	A	H	H	A	H	A	H	A	A	H	A	H	A	H	A	H	A	A	H	A	H	A	H
Result	D	L	D	L	W	L	W	D	D	D	D	L	W	W	W	L	W	D	W	L	W	L	W	L	D	L	L	D	W	W
Position	6	12	13	15	10	11	10	11	11	12	10	11	10	8	5	5	4	5	4	6	4	5	4	5	6	6	9	8	8	6

Source: Competitive matches
A = Away; H = Home; W = Win; D = Draw; L = Loss

==== Matches ====
20 August 2004 Round 1	USM Blida	1–1	CA Bordj Bou Arreridj	Blida
:	Galloul 47' (pen.)	Report	Djaref 88' (pen.)	Stadium: Stade Mustapha Tchaker; Referee: Djamel Haimoudi

26 August 2004 Round 2	JS Kabylie	1–0	USM Blida	Tizi Ouzou
:	Boudjakdji 45'		Galloul (penalty missed) 78'	Stadium: Stade 1er Novembre 1954; Referee: Mohamed Zekrini

9 September 2004 Round 3	USM Blida	1–1	USM Annaba	Blida
:	Touil 49', (penalty missed) 90+7'		Hammadou 67' Younes (yellow card) 47' (yellow-red card) 70'	Stadium: Stade Mustapha Tchaker; Referee: Mohamed Amine Benaissa

16 September 2004 Round 4	MC Alger	1–0	USM Blida	Bologhine
:	Braham-Chaouch 9'		Mehdaoui (penalty missed) 55'	Stadium: Omar Hamadi Stadium; Referee: Mohamed Benouza

20 September 2004 Round 5	USM Blida	1–0	CR Belouizdad	Blida
:	Touil 20'	Report		Stadium: Stade Mustapha Tchaker; Referee: Mohamed Khelifi

30 September 2004 Round 6	ES Sétif	2–1	USM Blida	Sétif
:	Fellahi 72'; Achouri 82'	Report	Touil 54'	Stadium: Stade 8 Mai 1945; Referee: Mustapha Boumediene Mansouri

14 October 2004 Round 7	USM Blida	2–0	GC Mascara	Blida
:	Touil 76'; Bettouaf 83'	Report	Bouras (yellow card) 18' (yellow-red card) 90'	Stadium: Stade Mustapha Tchaker; Referee: Farouk Ouchène

21 October 2004 Round 8	WA Tlemcen	0–0	USM Blida	Tlemcen
:			Rouane (yellow card) 58' (yellow-red card) 81'	Stadium: Stade des 3 Frères Zerga; Referee: Amar Yamani

28 October 2004 Round 9	USM Blida	2–2	ASO Chlef	Blida
:	Touil 56'; B. Zouani 62'	Report	Belahouel 5'; Ferhati 68'; Chaoui (yellow card) 50' (yellow-red card) 80'	Stadium: Stade Mustapha Tchaker; Referee: Mokhtar Amalou

4 November 2004 Round 10	USM Blida	1–1	MC Oran	Blida
:	Galloul 82'	Report	Daoud 22'	Stadium: Stade Mustapha Tchaker; Referee: Belkacem Boumaza

12 November 2004 Round 11	NA Hussein Dey	1–1	USM Blida
:	Alliche 16'		Touil 78'; Badache (yellow card) 59' (yellow-red card) 64'	Referee: Djamel Haimoudi

25 November 2004 Round 12	USM Blida	0–2	USM Alger	Blida
:		Report	Dziri 9', 72'	Stadium: Stade Mustapha Tchaker; Referee: Touati Djaballah

2 December 2004 Round 13	OMR El Annasser	0–1	USM Blida
:			Galloul 55'	Referee: Samir Boubakour

9 December 2004 Round 14	USM Blida	3–0	US Chaouia	Blida
:	Mehdaoui 35'; Touil 62'; B. Zouani 63'	Report		Stadium: Stade Mustapha Tchaker; Referee: Djamel Haimoudi

16 December 2004 Round 15	CS Constantine	0–1	USM Blida	Constantine
:		Report	Rouane 90+1'	Stadium: Stade Mohamed Hamlaoui; Referee: Redouane Mehidi

13 January 2005 Round 16	CA Bordj Bou Arreridj	2–0	USM Blida	Bordj Bou Arréridj
:	Nankop (penalty missed) 44, 44'; Boutine 77'			Stadium: Stade 20 Août 1955; Referee: Redouane Mehidi

17 January 2005 Round 17	USM Blida	2–1	JS Kabylie	Blida
:	B. Zouani 39'; Ghoul 76'; Amadou Tall (yellow card) 45' (yellow-red card) 90'		Khenifsi 56' (o.g)	Stadium: Stade Mustapha Tchaker; Referee: Houari Belkacem

31 January 2005 Round 18	USM Annaba	2–2	USM Blida	Annaba
:	Loukili 52'; Bensaïd 59' (pen.)		Mehdaoui 27'; Diss 79'	Stadium: Stade Abdelkader Chabou; Attendance: 2.000; Referee: Mohamed Benouza

29 April 2003 Round 19	USM Blida	3–1	MC Alger	Blida
:	Mehdaoui 19'; B. Zouani 48'; Zmit 58'; Mamadou Tall (yellow card) 24' (yellow-red card) 37'	Report	Rafan Sidibé 80' (pen.)	Stadium: Stade Mustapha Tchaker; Referee: Mohamed Zekrini

17 February 2005 Round 20	CR Belouizdad	2–1	USM Blida
:	Belhamel 35'; Mounir Dob 48'	Report	Bouguèche 36'	Referee: Said Douala

24 February 2005 Round 21	USM Blida	3–0	ES Sétif	Blida
:	Samir Galloul 12'; Belouahem 48'; Badache 85'	Report		Stadium: Stade Mustapha Tchaker; Referee: Houari Belkacem

10 March 2005 Round 22	GC Mascara	1–0	USM Blida	Mascara
:	Saihi 45+1'		Belouahem (red card) 55'	Stadium: Stade de l'Unité Africaine; Referee: Mohamed Khelifi

31 March 2005 Round 23	USM Blida	2–0	WA Tlemcen	Blida
:	Tahraoui 59'; B. Zouani 88'	Report		Stadium: Stade Mustapha Tchaker; Referee: Mohamed Amine Benaissa

14 April 2005 Round 24	ASO Chlef	1–0	USM Blida	Chlef
:	Zaoui 69'	Report		Stadium: Stade Mohamed Boumezrag; Referee: Farouk Ouchène

18 April 2005 Round 25	MC Oran	0–0	USM Blida	Oran
:		Report		Stadium: Habib Bouakeul Stadium; Referee: Mohamed Abdessamad

16 May 2005 Round 26	USM Blida	0–1	NA Hussein Dey	Blida
:			Alliche 70'	Stadium: Stade Mustapha Tchaker; Referee: Fouad Djerboua

26 May 2005 Round 27	USM Alger	4–1	USM Blida	Bologhine
:	Dziri 30', 90'; Doucouré 45'; Haddou 57'		Zmit 65'	Stadium: Omar Hamadi Stadium; Referee: Mustapha Ferradi

2 June 2005 Round 28	USM Blida	0–0	OMR El Annasser	Blida
:		Report		Stadium: Stade Mustapha Tchaker; Referee: Kestali, Benchraïr, Smara

9 June 2005 Round 29	US Chaouia	1–3	USM Blida	Oum El Bouaghi
:	Djebaili 87'; Lahouassa (red card) 9'		Adnane 5' (o.g.); Zmit 51'; Bouguèche 66'	Stadium: Stade Zerdani-Hsouma; Referee: Said Benamara

13 June 2005 Round 30	USM Blida	4–1	CS Constantine	Blida
:	Touil 17'; Zmit 70'; Mehdaoui 81'; Touil 87'	Report	Ouachem 35' (pen.)	Stadium: Stade Mustapha Tchaker; Referee: Djamel Haimoudi

== Algerian Cup ==
6 January 2005 Round of 64	USM Blida	2–0	Jil Sidi Salem	Sétif
	B.Zouani 38'; Bouguèche 82'			Stadium: Stade 8 Mai 1945; Referee: Khelifi (Tamane - Bouroubi)
Note: Lineup for USM Blida - Boulifa, Mamadou Tall (Aoun Seghir, 46'), Belouaham, Diss, Amadou Tall, Benayada, Zmit, Mehdaoui, Touil (Rouane, 56’), Badache (Bouguèche, 75’), B.Zouani - Coach: Angelescu

4 February 2005 Round of 32	USM Blida	2–1	CA Bordj Bou Arreridj	Bouira
	Houari 5' (o.g.); B.Zouani 16'		Nankop 18'	Stadium: Rabah Bitat Stadium; Referee: Djamel Haimoudi
Note: Lineup for USM Blida - Samadi - Galoul, Diss, Mamadou Tall, Ghoul - Zmit, Amadou Tall, Mehdaoui (Badache 47’) - B.Zouani (Rouane 34’), Tahraoui (Benayada 63’), Touil - Coach: Angelescu

14 March 2005 Round of 16	A Bou Saâda	1–1 (2–3 p)	USM Blida	Bouira
	Abadli 27'	Report	Touil 46'	Stadium: Rabah Bitat Stadium; Referee: Boumaza, Salhi, Bouziani
Note: Lineup for USM Blida - Samadi, Galoul, Ghoul, Mamadou Tall, Benayada, Amadou Tall, Zmit, Mehdaoui (Rouane 83’), B.Zouani (Meçabih 72’), Touil, Badache - Coach: Angelescu

8 May 2005 Quarter-finals	USM Sétif	1–0 (a.e.t.)	USM Blida	Bouira
	Mellouli 109'			Stadium: Rabah Bitat Stadium; Referee: Mansouri
Note: Lineup for USM Blida - Samadi - Amadou Tall (Aoun Seghir 39'), Benayada, Diss, Belouaham - Tahraoui (Rouane 46’), Zmit, Galoul, B.Zouani - Badache, Touil (Meçabih 73’) - Coach: Angelescu

== Squad information ==
=== Appearances and goals ===
No.	Pos	Nat	Player	Total		Division 1		Algerian Cup	
No.	Pos	Nat	Player	Apps	Goals	Apps	Goals	Apps	Goals
1	GK	(Algeria) ALG	Salah Mohamed Samadi	18	0	15	0	3	0
22	GK	(Algeria) ALG	El Hadi Fayçal Ouadah	9	0	9	0	0	0
23	GK	(Algeria) ALG	Ahmed Boulifa	8	0	7	0	1	0
4	DF	(Algeria) ALG	Abdelkader Benayada	31	0	27	0	4	0
5	DF	(Algeria) ALG	Smaïl Diss	28	1	25	1	3	0
28	DF	(Burkina Faso) BFA	Mamadou Tall	20	0	17	0	3	0
-	DF	(Algeria) ALG	Zoheir Bendida	1	0	1	0	0	0
-	DF	(Algeria) ALG	Fouad Aissa	1	0	1	0	0	0
2	DF	(Algeria) ALG	Sid Ali Khenifsi	13	0	13	0	0	0
3	DF	(Algeria) ALG	Sid Ahmed Belouahem	24	1	22	1	2	0
20	DF	(Algeria) ALG	Samir Galoul	30	4	27	4	3	0
25	DF	(Algeria) ALG	Mourad Farhi	2	0	2	0	0	0
30	DF	(Algeria) ALG	Tarek Ghoul	6	1	4	1	2	0
-	MF	(Algeria) ALG	Bilel Herbache	3	0	3	0	0	0
-	MF	(Algeria) ALG	Farouk Allali	2	0	2	0	0	0
6	MF	(Algeria) ALG	Zoubir Zmit	33	4	29	4	4	0
8	MF	(Algeria) ALG	Mohamed Aoun Seghir	20	0	18	0	2	0
-	MF	(Burkina Faso) BFA	Amadou Tall	10	0	6	0	4	0
27	MF	(Burkina Faso) BFA	Harouna Traoré	0	0	0	0	0	0
7	FW	(Algeria) ALG	Hadj Bouguèche	23	3	22	2	1	1
18	FW	(Algeria) ALG	Mohamed Mehdaoui	28	4	25	4	3	0
22	FW	(Algeria) ALG	Aboubaker Rebih	13	0	13	0	0	0
9	FW	(Algeria) ALG	Farid Touil	31	10	27	9	4	1
11	FW	(Algeria) ALG	Billal Zouani	30	7	26	5	4	2
13	FW	(Algeria) ALG	Mohamed Badache	22	1	18	1	4	0
14	FW	(Algeria) ALG	Abdelmadjid Tahraoui	9	1	7	1	2	0
16	FW	(Algeria) ALG	Benhalima Rouane	28	1	24	1	4	0
21	FW	(Algeria) ALG	Abdelmalek Bettouaf	7	1	7	1	0	0
26	FW	(Algeria) ALG	Ali Meçabih	5	0	3	0	2	0

Last updated: 13 June 2005
Source: Competitions

=== Goalscorers ===
Includes all competitive matches. The list is sorted alphabetically by surname when total goals are equal.
