= 2002–03 USM Blida season =

USM Blida
2002–03 season
- President: Mohamed Zaïm
- Head coach: Younès Ifticen
- Stadium: Stade Mustapha Tchaker
- Division 1: Runners-up
- Algerian Cup: Round of 64
- Top goalscorer: League: Mohamed Badache (9 goals); All: Mohamed Badache (9 goals)

In the 2002–03 season, USM Blida is competing in Division 1 for the 16th time, as well as the Algerian Cup. It is their 6th consecutive season in the top flight of Algerian football. They will be competing in Division 1 and the Algerian Cup.

== Squad list ==
Players and squad numbers last updated on 22 August 2002.
Note: Flags indicate national team as has been defined under FIFA eligibility rules. Players may hold more than one non-FIFA nationality.

No.	Nat.	Position	Name	Date of Birth (Age)	Signed from
Goalkeepers
	(Algeria)	GK	Salah Mohamed Samadi	16 September 1976 (aged 25)	(Algeria) JS Bordj Ménaïel
	(Algeria)	GK	Merouane Messai	10 February 1977 (aged 25)	(Algeria) [[]]
	(Algeria)	GK	Faycal Bezari	19 June 1982 (aged 20)	(Algeria) [[]]
Defenders
	(Algeria)	CB	Smaïl Diss	2 December 1976 (aged 25)	(Algeria) ES Mostaganem
	(Algeria)	CB	Sid Ahmed Belouahem	26 August 1977 (aged 24)	(Algeria) NA Hussein Dey
	(Algeria)		Rezki Amrouche	17 November 1970 (aged 31)	(France) Stade Brestois
	(Algeria)		Samir Galoul	18 October 1976 (aged 25)	(Algeria) JS Bordj Ménaïel
	(Algeria)		Sid Ali Khenifsi	16 November 1980 (aged 21)	(Algeria) Youth system
	(Algeria)		Salim Drali	14 June 1974 (aged 28)	(Algeria) [[]]
	(Algeria)		Ouahid Fetahine	27 November 1974 (aged 27)	(Algeria) [[]]
	(Algeria)		Fouad Aissa	4 May 1978 (aged 24)	(Algeria) [[]]
Midfielders
	(Algeria)		Kamel Maouche	17 May 1977 (aged 25)	(Algeria) USM Alger
	(Algeria)		Hakim Ait Mokhtar	10 March 1980 (aged 22)	(Algeria) [[]]
	(Algeria)		Mohamed Khazrouni	18 March 1969 (aged 33)	(Finland) Atlantis
	(Algeria)		Mahfoud Djeddou	8 January 1980 (aged 22)	(Algeria) [[]]
	(Ghana)		Mussah Awudu	7 April 1982 (aged 20)	(Ghana) [[]]
	(Algeria)		Rabah Bouaroura	30 May 1983 (aged 19)	(Algeria) IRB Hadjout
	(Algeria)		Mohamed Aoun Seghir	27 August 1983 (aged 18)	(Algeria) [[]]
Forwards
	(Algeria)		Mohamed Mehdaoui	29 September 1979 (aged 22)	(Algeria) CA Bordj Bou Arreridj
	(Algeria)		Billal Zouani	11 December 1969 (aged 32)	(Finland) Atlantis
	(Algeria)		Mohamed Badache	15 October 1976 (aged 25)	(Algeria) ES Sétif
	(Algeria)		Benhalima Rouane	28 February 1979 (aged 23)	(Algeria) JSM Tiaret
	(Algeria)		Mohamed Fekhari		(Algeria) [[]]
	(Ghana)		Hassan Masaudu	14 September 1977 (aged 24)	(Ghana) [[]]

== Competitions ==
=== Overview ===
Competition	Record								Started round	Final position / round	First match	Last match
Competition	G	W	D	L	GF	GA	GD	Win %	Started round	Final position / round	First match	Last match
Division 1	30	14	9	7	32	22	+10	46.67	—	Runners-up	22 August 2002	12 May 2003
Algerian Cup	1	0	0	1	0	2	−2	0.00	Round of 64		2 March 2003	
Total	31	14	9	8	32	23	+9	45.16				

=== Division 1 ===
==== League table ====
Pos	Team	Pld	W	D	L	GF	GA	GD	Pts	Qualification or relegation
1	USM Alger (C)	30	17	7	6	52	17	+35	58	2004 CAF Champions League
2	USM Blida	30	14	9	7	32	22	+10	51	2003-04 Arab Champions League
3	NA Hussein Dey	30	13	12	5	32	24	+8	51	2003-04 Arab Champions League
4	JS Kabylie	30	13	10	7	38	24	+14	49	
5	CR Belouizdad	30	12	9	9	28	20	+8	44 (Note: 1 point deducted)	2004 CAF Confederation Cup

Updated to match(es) played on May 2014. Source: DZFoot
Rules for classification: 1) points; 2) goal difference; 3) number of goals scored.
(C) Champions

==== Results summary ====
Overall								Home						Away					
Pld	W	D	L	GF	GA	GD	Pts	W	D	L	GF	GA	GD	W	D	L	GF	GA	GD
30	14	9	7	32	22	+10	51	11	4	0	23	4	+19	3	5	7	9	18	−9

Last updated: 12 May 2003.
Source: Competitive matches

==== Results by round ====
Round	1	2	3	4	5	6	7	8	9	10	11	12	13	14	15	16	17	18	19	20	21	22	23	24	25	26	27	28	29	30
Ground	A	H	A	H	A	A	H	A	H	A	H	A	H	A	H	H	A	H	A	H	H	A	H	A	H	A	H	A	H	A
Result	L	W	D	W	L	L	W	W	W	D	W	L	D	D	W	W	W	W	L	W	D	L	W	L	D	D	D	D	W	W
Position	14	6	7	5	8	9	6	5	3	4	2	5	5	5	2	2	2	2	2	2	2	2	2	2	2	2	2	2	2	2

Source: Competitive matches
A = Away; H = Home; W = Win; D = Draw; L = Loss

==== Matches ====
22 August 2002 Round 1	USM Annaba	1–0	USM Blida	Annaba
14:30	Amrane 52'			Stadium: Stade 19 Mai 1956; Referee: Farouk Ouchène

30 August 2002 Round 2	USM Blida	3–0	ASM Oran	Blida
	Galoul 19'; B.Zouani 28'; Ait Mokhtar 63'			Stadium: Stade Mustapha Tchaker; Referee: Mohamed Khelifi

12 September 2002 Round 3	NA Hussein Dey	0–0	USM Blida	Belouizdad
				Stadium: 20 August 1955 Stadium; Referee: Sofiane Benchenah

19 September 2002 Round 4	USM Blida	2–0	ES Sétif	Blida
	Badache 12'; Mehdaoui 84'	Report		Stadium: Stade Mustapha Tchaker; Referee: Salah Benamar

5 October 2002 Round 5	CR Belouizdad	2–1	USM Blida	Belouizdad
	Selmi 18'; Boukessassa 42' (pen.)		Badache 34'	Stadium: 20 August 1955 Stadium; Referee: Mohamed Bichari

14 October 2002 Round 6	JSM Béjaïa	1–0	USM Blida	Béjaïa
	Amaouche Hakim 59'			Stadium: Stade de l'Unité Maghrébine

30 November 2002 Round 7	USM Blida	2–0	JS Kabylie	Blida
	Khazrouni 11'; B.Zouani 58'	Report		Stadium: Stade Mustapha Tchaker; Referee: Mehdi Abdi

25 October 2002 Round 8	CA Bordj Bou Arreridj	0–1	USM Blida	Bordj Bou Arreridj
		Report	Belouahem 78'	Stadium: Stade 20 Août 1955; Referee: Zaki Lahmar

31 October 2002 Round 9	USM Blida	1–0	USM Alger	Blida
	Galoul (yellow card) 8'; Khazrouni (yellow card) 16'; Salim Drali 90+3'	Report	Ghazi (yellow card) 14'; Ammour (yellow card) 75'; Ghoul (yellow card) 87'; Dziri (yellow card) 90+4'	Stadium: Stade Mustapha Tchaker; Referee: Djezzar Azem

7 November 2002 Round 10	RC Kouba	1–1	USM Blida	Kouba
	Bouferma 76' (pen.)		Badache 38'	Stadium: Stade Omar Benhaddad; Referee: Mohamed Amine Benaissa

14 November 2002 Round 11	USM Blida	2–1	MC Oran	Blida
	Galoul 15' (pen.); Amrouche 50' (pen.)	Report	Meçabih 60'	Stadium: Stade Mustapha Tchaker; Referee: Mohamed Bichari

21 November 2002 Round 12	CA Batna	1–0	USM Blida	Batna
	Benhacène 90+2'	Report		Stadium: Mustapha Seffouhi Stadium; Referee: Mohamed Ould Abdellah

10 December 2002 Round 13	USM Blida	0–0	ASO Chlef	Blida
				Stadium: Stade Mustapha Tchaker; Referee: Mohamed Zekrini

12 December 2002 Round 14	WA Tlemcen	0–0	USM Blida	Tlemcen
		Report		Stadium: Stade Akid Lotfi; Referee: Houari Belkacem

19 December 2002 Round 15	USM Blida	2–1	MO Constantine	Blida
	Badache 52', 74'	Report	Kherkhache 78'	Stadium: Stade Mustapha Tchaker; Referee: Brahim Seghir

11 January 2003 Round 16	USM Blida	2–0	USM Annaba	Blida
	Galoul 29' (pen.); Maouche 36'	Report		Stadium: Stade Mustapha Tchaker; Referee: Redouane Mehidi

16 January 2003 Round 17	ASM Oran	0–1	USM Blida	Oran
		Report	Rouane 75'	Stadium: Stade Ahmed Zabana; Referee: Sofiane Benchenah

20 January 2003 Round 18	USM Blida	3–0	NA Hussein Dey	Blida
	Galoul 45' (pen.)			Stadium: Stade Mustapha Tchaker; Referee: Said Hirèche

30 January 2003 Round 19	ES Sétif	2–1	USM Blida	Sétif
	Laâmeche 15'; Fellahi 25'	Report	Galoul 42'	Stadium: Stade 8 Mai 1945; Referee: Touati Djaballah

4 February 2003 Round 20	USM Blida	1–0	CR Belouizdad	Blida
	Galoul 57' (pen.)			Stadium: Stade Mustapha Tchaker; Referee: Zaki Lahmar

6 February 2003 Round 21	USM Blida	1–1	JSM Béjaïa	Blida
	Badache 55'	Report	Boulanceur 89'	Stadium: Stade Mustapha Tchaker; Referee: Messaoud Kadri

17 February 2003 Round 22	JS Kabylie	4–0	USM Blida	Tizi Ouzou
	Ghazi 10', 33', 73'; Maghraoui 85'			Stadium: Stade du 1er Novembre 1954

24 February 2003 Round 23	USM Blida	2–0	CA Bordj Bou Arreridj	Blida
	Badache 7', 80'			Stadium: Stade Mustapha Tchaker; Referee: Amar Yamani

6 March 2003 Round 24	USM Alger	3–0	USM Blida	Bologhine
	Deghmani (yellow card) 26'; Ouichaoui 37', 80'; Aribi (yellow card) 46'; Dziri 67'	Report	Salim Drali (yellow card) 4'; Ahmed Amrouche (yellow card) 18'; Diss (yellow card) 45'	Stadium: Omar Hamadi Stadium; Referee: Zaki Lahmar

20 March 2003 Round 25	USM Blida	1–1	RC Kouba	Blida
	Galoul 46'	Report	Khelfouni 67' (pen.)	Stadium: Stade Mustapha Tchaker; Referee: Touati Djaballah

3 April 2003 Round 26	MC Oran	1–1	USM Blida	Oran
	S.Daoud 40'	Report	Amrouche 88'	Stadium: Stade Ahmed Zabana; Referee: Mohamed Khelifi

10 April 2003 Round 27	USM Blida	0–0	CA Batna	Blida
		Report		Stadium: Stade Mustapha Tchaker; Referee: Mohamed Ould Abdellah

5 May 2003 Round 28	ASO Chlef	1–1	USM Blida	Chlef
	Ali Hadji 26'		Badache 34'	Stadium: Stade Maâmar Sahli; Referee: Mohamed Zekrini

8 May 2003 Round 29	USM Blida	1–0	WA Tlemcen	Blida
	Drali 16'	Report		Stadium: Stade Mustapha Tchaker; Referee: Mohamed Amine Benaissa

13 May 2003 Round 30	MO Constantine	1–2	USM Blida	Constantine
	Kamoua 29'		Amaouche (penalty missed) 40', 57'; Diss 47'	Stadium: Ramadane Ben Abdelmalek Stadium; Referee: Redouane Mehidi

== Algerian Cup ==
2 March 2003 Round of 32	USM Blida	0–2	SCM Oran	Chlef
		Report	Dida 79'; Belhadef 85'; Hocine (yellow card) 83'	Stadium: Stade Maâmar Sahli; Referee: Redouane Mehidi
Note: Lineup for USM Blida - Samadi, Fekhari, Belouahem (Bouaroura, 34’), Khenifsi, Diss, Rouane, Awudu, Aït Mokhtar (Khalfouni, 60’), Masaudu, Maouche, Billal Zouani (Badache, 65’).

== Squad information ==
=== Appearances and goals ===
No.	Pos	Nat	Player	Total		Division 1		Algerian Cup	
No.	Pos	Nat	Player	Apps	Goals	Apps	Goals	Apps	Goals
1	GK	(Algeria) ALG	Salah Mohamed Samadi	28	0	27	0	1	0
16	GK	(Algeria) ALG	Merouane Messai	1	0	1	0	0	0
-	GK	(Algeria) ALG	Faycal Bezari	2	0	2	0	0	0
4	DF	(Algeria) ALG	Rezki Amrouche	28	2	28	2	0	0
12	DF	(Algeria) ALG	Samir Galoul	28	7	28	7	0	0
5	DF	(Algeria) ALG	Smaïl Diss	27	1	26	1	1	0
17	DF	(Algeria) ALG	Sid Ahmed Belouahem	25	1	24	1	1	0
3	DF	(Algeria) ALG	Salim Drali	24	2	24	2	0	0
-	DF	(Algeria) ALG	Ouahid Fetahine	22	0	22	0	0	0
2	DF	(Algeria) ALG	Sid Ali Khenifsi	15	0	14	0	1	0
19	DF	(Algeria) ALG	Fouad Aissa	4	0	4	0	0	0
10	MF	(Algeria) ALG	Kamel Maouche	29	1	28	1	1	0
-	MF	(Algeria) ALG	Hakim Aït Mokhtar	23	1	22	1	1	0
20	MF	(Algeria) ALG	Mohamed Khazrouni	19	2	19	2	0	0
-	MF	(Ghana) GHA	Mussah Awudu	15	0	14	0	1	0
-	MF	(Algeria) ALG	Mahfoud Djeddou	9	0	9	0	0	0
23	MF	(Algeria) ALG	Rabah Bouaroura	3	0	2	0	1	0
-	MF	(Algeria) ALG	Khalfouni	1	0	0	0	1	0
-	MF	(Algeria) ALG	Mohamed Aoun Seghir	0	0	0	0	0	0
11	FW	(Algeria) ALG	Benhalima Rouane	28	1	27	1	1	0
13	FW	(Algeria) ALG	Mohamed Badache	26	9	25	9	1	0
7	FW	(Algeria) ALG	Billal Zouani	24	2	23	2	1	0
-	FW	(Ghana) GHA	Hassan Masaudu	16	0	15	0	1	0
18	FW	(Algeria) ALG	Mohamed Mehdaoui	15	1	15	1	0	0
-	FW	(Algeria) ALG	Mohamed Fekhari	4	0	3	0	1	0

Last updated: 12 May 2003
Source: Competitions

=== Goalscorers ===
Includes all competitive matches. The list is sorted alphabetically by surname when total goals are equal.

No.	Nat.	Player	Pos.	D 1	AC	TOTAL
-	(Algeria)	Mohamed Badache	FW	9	0	9
-	(Algeria)	Samir Galoul	DF	7	0	7
-	(Algeria)	Billal Zouani	FW	2	0	2
-	(Algeria)	Kamel Maouche	MF	1	0	2
-	(Algeria)	Benhalima Rouane	FW	1	0	1
-	(Algeria)	Mohamed Mehdaoui	FW	1	0	1
-	(Algeria)	Mohamed Khazrouni	MF	2	0	2
-	(Algeria)	Salim Drali	DF	2	0	2
-	(Algeria)	Rezki Amrouche	DF	2	0	2
-	(Algeria)	Hakim Ait Mokhtar	MF	1	0	1
-	(Algeria)	Smaïl Diss	DF	1	0	1
-	(Algeria)	Sid Ahmed Belouahem	DF	1	0	1
Own Goals				0	0	0
Totals				32	0	32
