= 2000–01 USM Blida season =

USM Blida
2000–01 season
- Chairman: Mohamed Zaïm
- Head coach: Kamel Mouassa
- Stadium: Brakni Brothers Stadium
- National 1: 4th
- Algerian Cup: Round of 32
- Top goalscorer: League: Kamel Kherkhache (12 goals); All: Kamel Kherkhache (13 goals)
Home colours	Away colours

In the 2000–01 season, USM Blida is competing in the National 1 for the 16th season, as well as the Algerian Cup. They will be competing in Ligue 1, and the Algerian Cup.

== Competitions ==
=== Overview ===
Competition	Record								Started round	Final position / round	First match	Last match
Competition	G	W	D	L	GF	GA	GD	Win %	Started round	Final position / round	First match	Last match
National 1	30	14	5	11	42	30	+12	46.67	—N/a	4th	7 September 2000	27 May 2001
Algerian Cup	2	0	1	1	1	2	−1	0.00	Round of 64	Round of 16	5 February 2001	29 March 2001
Total	32	14	6	12	43	32	+11	43.75				

Updated to match played 26 March 2020
Source: Competitions

=== National ===
==== League table ====
Pos	Team	Pld	W	D	L	GF	GA	GD	Pts	Qualification or relegation
2	USM Alger	30	15	10	5	51	28	+23	55	2002 African Cup Winners' Cup
3	JS Kabylie	30	16	4	10	47	28	+19	52	2002 CAF Cup
4	USM Blida	30	14	5	11	42	30	+12	47	
5	ASM Oran	30	12	8	10	38	32	+6	44	
6	USM Annaba	30	11	9	10	39	33	+6	42	

Source: rsssf
Rules for classification: 1) points; 2) goal difference; 3) number of goals scored.

=== Results summary ===
Overall								Home						Away					
Pld	W	D	L	GF	GA	GD	Pts	W	D	L	GF	GA	GD	W	D	L	GF	GA	GD
30	14	5	11	42	30	+12	47	13	1	1	35	8	+27	1	4	10	7	22	−15

Last updated: June 2001.
Source: Competitive matches

=== Results by round ===
Round	1	2	3	4	5	6	7	8	9	10	11	12	13	14	15	16	17	18	19	20	21	22	23	24	25	26	27	28	29	30
Ground	A	H	A	H	A	H	A	H	H	A	H	A	H	A	H	H	A	H	A	H	A	H	A	A	H	A	H	A	H	A
Result	L	W	L	W	L	W	D	D	W	L	W	L	W	L	W	W	D	W	L	L	D	W	W	D	W	L	W	L	W	L
Position	15	7	9	7	11	8	7	9	5	8	6	10	7	9	7	5	5	3	4	5	4	4	4	4	4	4	4	4	4	4

Updated to match(es) played on 27 May 2001. Source: Competitive matches
A = Away; H = Home; W = Win; D = Draw; L = Loss

=== Matches ===
Win Draw Loss

7 September 2000 Round 1	USM Annaba	1–0	USM Blida	Annaba
15:00	Soltani 33'; Slatni (yellow card)	Report	(yellow card) Ahmed Amrouche; (yellow card) Harkas	Stadium: 19 May 1956 Stadium; Referee: Benchana, Dani-Sedrati
Note: Lineup for USM Blida - Samadi, Krebaza, Drali, Amrouche, Galoul, Tizarouine, Manga (Baïd), Baït Harkas (Bakir), Kherkhache, Khazrouni (Zafour), Zouani – Coach: Kamel Mouassa

14 September 2000 Round 2	USM Blida	3–1	ASM Oran	Blida
15:00	Belatoui (24' (o.g.); Bakir 37'; Zouani 64'; Harkas (yellow card); Samadi (yellow card)	Report	Meziane 52'; (yellow card) Amour	Stadium: Brakni Brothers Stadium; Referee: Zekrini, Mazari-Zoubiri
Note: Lineup for USM Blida - Samadi, Krebaza, Drali, Maâmeri (Bakir), Amrouche, Galoul, Khazrouni, Harkas, Kherkhache, Badache (Manga), Zouani – Coach: Kamel Mouassa

21 September 2000 Round 3	JS Kabylie	2–0	USM Blida	Tizi Ouzou
15:00	Moussouni 41'; Abaci 67'; Belkaïd (yellow card) 78'; Benhamlat (yellow card) 86'	Report		Stadium: November 1, 1954 Stadium; Referee: Addi, Zinet et Lelouchi
Note: Lineup for USM Blida - Samadi, Krebaza, Drali, Amrouche, Galoul, Khazrouni, Talabouchet, Harkas, Kherkhache, Bakir, Zouani – Coach: Kamel Mouassa

16 October 2000 Round 4	USM Blida	2–0	CS Constantine	Blida
15:00	Zouani 1', 2'	Report		Stadium: Brakni Brothers Stadium
Note: Lineup for USM Blida - .

19 October 2000 Round 5	USM Alger	2–0	USM Blida	Algiers
15:00	Dziri 62'; Hadj Adlane 81'; Hamdoud (yellow card); Bazoz (yellow card); Smati (yellow card)	Report	(yellow card) Khezrouni; (yellow card) Aït Mokhtar; (yellow card) Krebaza	Stadium: Omar Hamadi Stadium; Referee: Oussali (Maouni-Berbiche)
Note: Lineup for USM Blida - Samadi, Krebaza (Benhadj 50’) - Drali - Amrouche - Galoul - Harkas - Kherkhache - Aït Mokhtar - Khazrouni - Bakir (Badache 80’) – Coach: Kamel Mouassa

26 October 2000 Round 6	USM Blida	7–1	WA Tlemcen	Blida
15:00	Zouani 2'; Kherkhache 60', 74', 86'; Bakir 43'; Khedraoui 45' (o.g.); Piracaïa 79'	Report	(yellow card) 35' Bensaha; (yellow card) 35' Chérifi; Betouaf 68'	Stadium: Brakni Brothers Stadium; Attendance: 10.000; Referee: Abdi (Lellouchi-Zinet)
Note: Lineup for USM Blida - Samadi, Krebaza, (Aït Mokhtar), Briki, Gallou, Khazrouni, Kherkhache (Badache), Harkas, Bakir, de Oliveira, Zouani (Tababouchet) – Coach: Kamel Mouassa

2 November 2000 Round 7	JSM Béjaïa	1–1	USM Blida	Béjaïa
15:00	Boudehouche 32'; Djillani (yellow card); Bouaoun (yellow card); Hadj Moussa (yellow card)	Report	de Oliveira 87'; (yellow card) Khezrouni; (yellow card) Badache	Stadium: Maghrebi Unity Stadium; Referee: Hirèche, (Mahmoudi-Lakour)
Note: Lineup for USM Blida - Samadi, Krebaza, Zane (Bouhlit 62’), Briki, Galoul, Khazrouni, Kherkhache, Bakir, Harkas (Badache 63’), de Oliveira, Zouani – Coach: Kamel Mouassa

9 November 2000 Round 8	USM Blida	0–0	USM El Harrach	Blida
15:00	Harkas (yellow card); Galoul (yellow card); Zouani (yellow card)	Report	(yellow card) Djebbar; (yellow card) Yahia; (yellow card) Kabri; (yellow card) Abdouni	Stadium: Brakni Brothers Stadium; Attendance: 10.000; Referee: Benchenaâ (Dani-Bourayou)
Note: Lineup for USM Blida - Samadi, Krebaza, Drahi, Briki, Galoul, Khazrouni (Aït Mokhtar), Kherkhache, Bakir (Badache), Harkas, de Oliveira, Zouani – Coach: Kamel Mouassa

16 November 2000 Round 9	USM Blida	3–1	AS Aïn M'lila	Blida
15:00	Krebazza (yellow card) 2'; Kherkhache 9'; Zouani (yellow card) 64'; Zouani 81'; Kherkhache 88'	Report	(yellow card) 57' Bechouar; Amaouche Samir 74'; (yellow card) 84' Mafaz; (red card) 85' Bechoua	Stadium: Brakni Brothers Stadium; Attendance: 4.000; Referee: Youbi, (Mezouar-Roumani)
Note: Lineup for USM Blida - Samadi, Krebaza, Drali (Briki), Amrouche, Galoul, Khazrouni, Kherkhache, Aït Mokhtar, Badache (Tababouchet Aoum Seghir), Di Oliveira, Zouani (cap) – Coach: Kamel Mouassa

23 November 2000 Round 10	MC Oran	1–0	USM Blida	Oran
15:00	Gaïd 10'; Boussaâda (yellow card); Guesbaoui (yellow card); Kechamli (yellow card); Amrane (yellow card)	Report	(yellow card) Drali; (yellow card) de Oliveira	Stadium: Ahmed Zabana Stadium; Attendance: 8.000; Referee: Lazzour (Ghanem-Benkhaled)
Note: Lineup for USM Blida - Samadi, Krebaza, Drali, Briki, Galoul, Harkas, Kherkhache, Aoun Seghir (Badache 70’), (Bouhelit 87’), Aït Mokhtar, de Oliveira, Zouani – Coach: Kamel Mouassa

27 November 2000 Round 11	USM Blida	3–2	MO Constantine	Blida
15:00	Kherkhache 16', 72'; Aït Mokhtar 18'			Stadium: Brakni Brothers Stadium
Note: Lineup for USM Blida - .

30 November 2000 Round 12	MC Alger	2–1	USM Blida	Algiers
15:00	Bouras 39'; Messaoudi 61'	Report	Tababouchet 46'; (yellow card) Khazrouni	Stadium: 5 July 1962 stadium Attendance: 5.000; Referee: Boubakour (Menana-Akrour)
Note: Lineup for USM Blida - Samadi - Bouhlit - (Zane 70’) - Drali - Briki - Harkas - Khazrouni - Aoun Seghir (Badache 43’ puis Baïd 77’) - Aït Mokhtar - Tababouchet - de Oliveira - Zouani – Coach: Kamel Mouassa

11 December 2000 Round 13	USM Blida	1–0	CA Batna	Blida
15:00	Zouani 20'	Report		Stadium: Brakni Brothers Stadium
Note: Lineup for USM Blida - .

14 December 2000 Round 14	ES Sétif	5–1	USM Blida	Sétif
15:00	Bourahli 7', 26'; Guenifi 12'; Belhamel 50', 90'; Guenifi (red card); Bourahli (yellow card)	Report	Zouani 6' (yellow card); (red card) Khazrouni; (yellow card) Harkes	Stadium: Stade 8 Mai 1945; Referee: Hireche (Mahmoudi-Nakouri)
Note: Lineup for USM Blida - Belmellat, Zafour, Aït Mokhtar, Briki, Gualoul, Khazrouni, Kherkhache, Bakir, Harkes, De Olivier, Zouani – Coach: Kamel Mouassa

21 December 2000 Round 15	USM Blida	1–0	CR Belouizdad	Blida
15:00	Zouani 56'; Kherkhache (yellow card)	Report	(yellow card) Bouaïcha	Stadium: Brakni Brothers Stadium; Attendance: 7.000; Referee: Daho, Tayeb-Tourboune
Note: Lineup for USM Blida - Samadi, Krebaza, Aoun, Seghir, Briki, Galoul, Harkas, Kherkhache, Bakir, Aït Mokhtar, de Oliveira, Zouani – Coach: Kamel Mouassa

18 January 2001 Round 16	USM Blida	2–0	USM Annaba	Blida
15:00	Zouani 44'; Kherkheche 75'; Briki (yellow card) 23'; Harnane (yellow card) 72'	Report	Djabali (yellow card) 8'	Stadium: Brakni Brothers Stadium; Referee: Belkacem (Kaïd-Oukil)
Note: Lineup for USM Blida - Samadi, Krebaza, Harnane, Briki, Galoul, Harkas, Kherkhache, Bakir, Djendir (Aït-Mokhtar), de Oliveira, Zouani – Coach: Kamel Mouassa

29 January 2001 Round 17	ASM Oran	1–1	USM Blida	Oran
15:00	Belatoui 65'; Mekki (yellow card)	Report	de Oliveira 85'; Galoul (yellow card)	Stadium: Habib Bouakeul Stadium; Referee: Lahmar (Sedrati-Khelfatni)
Note: Lineup for USM Blida - Samadi, Krebaza, Drali, Briki (Badache 80’), Galoul, Khazrouni, Djender (Aït Mokhtar 80’), Harkas, Kherkhache, de Oliveira, Zouani (cap) – Coach: Kamel Mouassa

1 February 2001 Round 18	USM Blida	1–0	JS Kabylie	Blida
15:00	Zouani 88'; Harnane (yellow card) (yellow-red card); Khezrouni (yellow card); Zouani (yellow card); Harkas (yellow card); Krebazza (yellow card); Kherkhache (yellow card); Di Oliveira (yellow card)	Report	Moussouni (yellow card); Boughrara (red card)	Stadium: Brakni Brothers Stadium; Attendance: 12.000; Referee: Mouellef (Atamnia-Talbi)
Note: Lineup for USM Blida - Samadi, Krebaza, Drali, Harnane, Harkas, Khazrouni, Djender (Aït Mokhtar), Bakir, Kherkhache, de Oliveira, Zouani – Coach: Kamel Mouassa

8 February 2001 Round 19	CS Constantine	2–0	USM Blida	Constantine
15:00	Bezzaz 60'; Barbari 70'; Arama (yellow card); Soumaré (yellow card); Barbari (yellow card); Bezzaz (yellow card)	Report	Briki (yellow card)	Stadium: Mohamed Hamlaoui Stadium; Referee: Seghier (Bentahar-Haïmoudi)
Note: Lineup for USM Blida - Samadi, Krebaza, Drali (Briki), Harnène, Galoul, Khazrouni, Bakir (Badache), Harkas, Kherkhache, de Oliveira, Djender (Aït Mokhtar) – Coach: Kamel Mouassa

15 February 2001 Round 20	USM Blida	1–2	USM Alger	Blida
15:00	Galoul 90' (pen.); Krebaza (yellow card) 10'; Harnane (yellow card) 21'	Report	Achiou 65'; Dziri 89'; Amirat (yellow card) 7'; Mezaïr (yellow card) 47'; Zeghdoud (yellow card) 59'; Hamdoud (yellow card) 80'; Djahnine (yellow card) 87'	Stadium: Brakni Brothers Stadium; Referee: Hirèche (Mahmoud-Nakouri)
Note: Lineup for USM Blida - Samadi, Krebaza, (Aït Mokhtar), Drali, Harnane, Galoul, Khazrouni, Bakir (Amrouche), Harkas, Kherkhèche, de Oliveira, Zouani – Coach: Kamel Mouassa

19 February 2001 Round 21	WA Tlemcen	1–1	USM Blida	Tlemcen
15:00	Kendouci 82'	Report	Kherkhache 62'; (yellow card) Aït Mokhtar; (yellow card) Kherkhache; (yellow card) Khazrouni	Stadium: Akid Lotfi Stadium; Referee: Ouchène (Debiche-Teria)
Note: Lineup for USM Blida - Samadi, Krebaza, Khazrouni, Bakir, Aït Mokhtar, Briki, Kherkhache, Zouani, de Oliveira, Galoul, Harkas – Coach: Kamel Mouassa

22 February 2001 Round 22	USM Blida	2–0	JSM Béjaïa	Blida
15:00	Zouani 41'; Galoul 94' (pen.); Harnane (yellow card) 36'; Harkas (yellow card) 57'; Zouani (yellow card) 66'; Khazrouni (yellow card) 72'	Report	Hebri (yellow card) 13'; Bennacere (yellow card) 44'	Stadium: Brakni Brothers Stadium; Referee: Lacarne (Belfekroun-Ghanem)
Note: Lineup for USM Blida - Samadi, Krebaza, Aït Mokhtar, Harnane, Galou, Khazrouni, Badache (Drali), Harkas, Bakir (Mikidèche), de Oliveira, Zouani – Coach: Kamel Mouassa

16 March 2001 Round 23	USM El Harrach	0–1	USM Blida	Hadjout
15:00		Report	Tababouchet 81'; (red card) Aït Mokhtar	Stadium: 5 July 1962 stadium Referee: Benchenaâ (Dani-Atamma)
Note: Lineup for USM Blida - Samadi, Krebaza, Drali, Harnane, Galoul, Khazrouni, Djender (Tababouchet), Aït Mokhtar, Bakir, de Oliveira, Zouani – Coach: Kamel Mouassa

20 March 2001 Round 24	AS Aïn M'lila	0–0	USM Blida	Aïn M'lila
15:00				Stadium: Touhami Zoubir Khelifi Stadium
Note: Lineup for USM Blida - .

9 April 2001 Round 25	USM Blida	3–1	MC Oran	Blida
15:00	Aït Mokhtar 40'; Drali 45'; Badache 46'; Aït Mokhtar (yellow card) 83'	Report	Bahloul 89' (pen.); (yellow card) 50' Hamiti	Stadium: Brakni Brothers Stadium; Attendance: 8.000; Referee: Bendada (Benhamouda-Cheriet)
Note: Lineup for USM Blida - Samadi, Krebaza, Drali, Harnane, Galoul, Khazrouni puis Badache (38’), Kherkhache, Harkas, Bakir, de Oliveira puis Aït Mokhtar (38’), Zouani – Coach: Kamel Mouassa

13 April 2001 Round 26	MO Constantine	1–0	USM Blida	Constantine
15:00	Bounaâs 41'; Akriche (yellow card); Bouazza (yellow card)	Report	(yellow card) Aït Mokhtar; (yellow card) Harkas	Stadium: Mohamed Hamlaoui Stadium; Referee: Barouza (Kaid-Oukil)
Note: Lineup for USM Blida - Samadi, Krebaza, Aït Mokhtar, Hernane, Galoul, Khazrouni, Herkas, Badèche, Kherkhache, Bakir, Zouani – Coach: Kamel Mouassa

17 April 2001 Round 27	USM Blida	3–0	MC Alger	Blida
15:00	Kherkhache 7', 90+2'; Zouani 90+3' (pen.); Di Oliveira (yellow card) 11'; Samadi (yellow card) 51'; Khazrouni (yellow card) 54'; Kherkhache (yellow card) 90+2'	Report	Messas (yellow card) 58'; Messaoudi (yellow card) 65'; Ouahid (yellow card) 84'	Stadium: Brakni Brothers Stadium; Attendance: 8.000; Referee: Mouellef, (Dani-Talbi)
Note: Lineup for USM Blida - Samadi, Krebaza, Khazrouni, Harnane (Aoun Seghir 27’), Galoul, Harkas, Badache, Bakir, Kherkhache, de Oliveira, Zouani – Coach: Kamel Mouassa

7 May 2001 Round 28	CA Batna	2–1	USM Blida	Batna
15:00	Mehellel 52'; Aribi 60'; Aribi (yellow card) 33'; Bouaraâra (yellow card) 66'	Report	Aoun Seghir 84'; (yellow card) 35' Drali; (yellow card) 89' Krebaza	Stadium: Mustapha Seffouhi Stadium; Attendance: 2.000; Referee: Belkacem (Deffar-Ouanès)
Note: Lineup for USM Blida - Belmellat, Krebaza, Drali (Amrouche, 70’), Briki (Zafour, 70’), Galoul, Harkas, Kherkhache, Aoun Seghir, Bakir, Aït Mokhtar et Khazrouni – Coach: Kamel Mouassa

21 May 2001 Round 29	USM Blida	3–0	ES Sétif	Blida
15:00	Kherkhache 3'; Badache 24', 53'; Drali (yellow card) 30'; Kherkhache (yellow card) 90'	Report	(yellow card) Guenifi; (yellow card) Regad	Stadium: Brakni Brothers Stadium; Attendance: 5.000; Referee: Lazouni (Belfekroun-Bellaradj)
Note: Lineup for USM Blida - Samadi, Krebaza, Drali, Amrouche, Galoul, Harkas, Aït Mokhtar puis Zafour (79’), Khazrouni, Kherkhache, Bakir, Badache puis Aoun Seghir (72’) – Coach: Kamel Mouassa

27 May 2001 Round 30	CR Belouizdad	1–0*	USM Blida	Algiers
15:00	Mezouar 8'	Report		Stadium: August 20, 1955 Stadium; Attendance: 18.000; Referee: Bechari (Benali-Hannichi)
Note: Stopped at 18 minute / Lineup for USM Blida (all players youth): Bezari - Messaoudi, Babi, Khelfaoui, Amari, Aoun Seghir, Mekideche, Chabane. Benchekidja

== Algerian Cup ==
5 February 2001 Round of 64	USM Blida	0–0 (a.e.t.) (3–2 p)	MO Constantine	Blida
15:00	Drali (yellow card) 41'; Briki (yellow card) 118'	Report	(yellow card) 10' Bourabia; (yellow card) 58' Bensahnoun	Stadium: Brakni Brothers Stadium; Referee: Djaballah - (Ounès, Kourd Bakir)
Note: Lineup for USM Blida - Samadi, Zafour, Drali, Briki, Galoul, Harkas, Djender, Aït Mokhtar, Kherkhache De Oliveira, Bakir – Coach: Kamel Mouassa

29 March 2001 Round of 32	JSM Béjaïa	2–1	USM Blida	Béjaïa
15:00	Djilani 28' (pen.); Boudahouche 52'; Belatrèche (yellow card); Kherbouche (yellow card)	Report	Kherkhache 72'; (yellow card) Harkas; (yellow card) Kharzouni	Stadium: Maghrebi Unity Stadium; Attendance: Benouza - (Oukil, Belkhaled)
Note: Lineup for USM Blida - Samadi, Krebaza, Aït Mokhtar, (Aoun Seghir, 59’), Harnane, Galoul, Khazrouni, Bakir, Harkas, Kherkhache, De Oliveira, Zouani (c) – Coach: Kamel Mouassa

== Squad information ==
=== Playing statistics ===
4, 11, 13, 24

No.	Pos	Nat	Player	Total		Ligue 1		Algerian Cup	
No.	Pos	Nat	Player	Apps	Goals	Apps	Goals	Apps	Goals
Goalkeepers
	GK	(Algeria) ALG	Salah Samadi	29	0	27	0	2	0
	GK	(Algeria) ALG	Farid Belmellat	2	0	2	0	0	0
	GK	(Algeria) ALG	Faycal Bezari	1	0	1	0	0	0
Defenders
	DF	(Algeria) ALG	Samir Galoul	24	2	22	2	2	0
	DF	(Algeria) ALG	Abdennour Krebazza	24	0	23	0	1	0
	DF	(Algeria) ALG	Salim Drali	17	1	16	1	1	0
	MF	(Algeria) ALG	Briki	14	0	13	0	1	0
	MF	(Algeria) ALG	Daoud Harnane	10	0	9	0	1	0
	MF	(Algeria) ALG	Ahmed Amrouche	8	0	8	0	0	0
	MF	(Algeria) ALG	Zafour	5	0	4	0	1	0
	DF	(Algeria) ALG	Zane	2	0	2	0	0	0
	DF	(Algeria) ALG	Tizarouine	2	0	2	0	0	0
	DF	(Algeria) ALG	Reda Benhadj	1	0	1	0	0	0
Midfielders
	MF	(Algeria) ALG	Bilal Harkas	24	0	22	0	2	0
	MF	(Algeria) ALG	Mohamed Khazrouni	23	0	22	0	1	0
	MF	(Algeria) ALG	Bakir	23	2	21	2	2	0
	MF	(Algeria) ALG	Hakim Aït Mokhtar	21	2	19	2	2	0
	MF	(Brazil) BRA	de Oliveira	20	3	18	3	2	0
	MF	(Algeria) ALG	Mohamed Aoun Seghir	8	1	7	1	1	0
	MF	(Algeria) ALG	Djender	6	0	5	0	1	0
	MF	(Algeria) ALG	Bouhlit	3	0	3	0	0	0
	MF	(Nigeria) NGA	Manga	2	0	2	0	0	0
	MF	(Algeria) ALG	Baïd	2	0	2	0	0	0
	MF	(Algeria) ALG	Reda Benhadj	1	0	1	0	0	0
	MF	(Algeria) ALG	Maâmeri	1	0	1	0	0	0
Forwards
	FW	(Algeria) ALG	Billal Zouani	23	12	22	12	1	0
	FW	(Algeria) ALG	Kamel Kherkhache	24	13	22	12	2	1
	FW	(Algeria) ALG	Mohamed Badache	14	3	14	3	0	0
	MF	(Algeria) ALG	Tababouchet	4	2	4	2	0	0
	DF	(Algeria) ALG	Mekideche	2	0	2	0	0	0
Players transferred out during the season

Last updated: 10 May 2001
Source: Competitions

=== Goalscorers ===
Includes all competitive matches. The list is sorted alphabetically by surname when total goals are equal.

No.	Nat.	Player	Pos.	L 1	AC	TOTAL
-	(Algeria)	Kamel Kherkhache	FW	12	1	13
-	(Algeria)	Billal Zouani	FW	12	0	12
-	(Brazil)	de Oliveira	MF	3	0	3
-	(Algeria)	Mohamed Badache	FW	3	0	3
-	(Algeria)	Bakir	MF	2	0	2
-	(Algeria)	Samir Galoul	DF	2	0	2
-	(Algeria)	Tababouchet	FW	2	0	2
-	(Algeria)	Hakim Aït Mokhtar	MF	2	0	2
-	(Algeria)	Mohamed Aoun Seghir	MF	1	0	1
-	(Algeria)	Salim Drali	DF	1	0	1
Own Goals				2	0	2
Totals				42	1	43

=== Assists ===
No.	Nat.	Player	Pos.	L 1	AC	TOTAL
-	(Algeria)	Billal Zouani	FW	9	0	9
-	(Brazil)	de Oliveira	MF	6	0	6

=== Clean sheets ===
Includes all competitive matches.

No.	Nat	Name	L 1	AC	TOTAL
	(Algeria)	Salah Samadi	11	1	12

=== Hat-tricks ===
Player	Against	Result	Date	Competition	Ref
(Algeria) Kamel Kherkhache	WA Tlemcen	7–1 (H)	26 October 2000	Super Division	

(H) – Home; (A) – Away

== Transfers ==
=== In ===
Date	Pos	Player	From club	Transfer fee	Source
2000	MF	(Brazil) de Oliviera	(Finland) Helsingin Jalkapalloklubi		
2000	GK	(Algeria) Salah Samadi	JS Bordj Ménaïel		
2000	GK	(Algeria) Farid Belmellat	USM Alger		
2000		(Algeria) Mohamed Briki			
2000	DF	(Algeria) Daoud Harnane			
2000		(Algeria) Reda Benhadj			
2000	MF	(Algeria) Hakim Aït Mokhtar			
2000	DF	(Algeria) Djender			
2000	FW	(Nigeria) Mohamed Manga	USM Alger		
2000	FW	(Algeria) Mohamed Badache	ES Sétif		

=== Out ===
Date	Pos	Player	From club	Transfer fee	Source
2000	GK	(Algeria) Mohamed Haniched			
2000		(Algeria) Abdeltif Derriche			
2000		(Algeria) Lyès Fetahine			
2000		(Algeria) Aït Belkacem			
2000		(Burkina Faso) Moussa Dagno			
2000		(Algeria) Mourad Aït Tahar			
2000		(Algeria) Samir Sloukia			
