= 2002–03 ES Sétif season =

ES Sétif
2002–03 season
- Head Coach: Boualem Charef
- Stadium: Stade 8 Mai 1945
- National 1: 7th
- Algerian Cup: Round of 64
- Top goalscorer: League: Farès Fellahi (15); All: Farès Fellahi (15)

The 2002–03 season will be ES Sétif's 33rd season in the Algerian top flight, They will be competing in National 1, and the Algerian Cup.

== Squad list ==
Players and squad numbers last updated on 1 September 2002.
Note: Flags indicate national team as has been defined under FIFA eligibility rules. Players may hold more than one non-FIFA nationality.

No.	Nat.	Position	Name	Date of birth (age)	Signed from
Goalkeepers
1	(Algeria)	GK	Rafi Douar	21 January 1976 (aged 26)	(Algeria)
18	(Algeria)	GK	Ammar Belhani	27 October 1971 (aged 31)	(Algeria) Youth system
	(Algeria)	GK	Sofiane Mechoug	6 July 1978 (aged 24)	(Algeria)
Defenders
20	(Algeria)		Abdenour Mahfoudhi	21 April 1980 (aged 22)	(Algeria) Youth system
14	(Algeria)		Smail Khaled	8 September 1975 (aged 27)	(Algeria) Youth system
5	(Algeria)		Réda Bendriss	16 September 1976 (aged 26)	(Algeria) Youth system
22	(Algeria)		Monir Madoui	18 August 1979 (aged 23)	(Algeria) Youth system
25	(Algeria)		Farés Makhalfi	26 February 1979 (aged 23)	(Algeria) Youth system
	(Algeria)		Hacéne Megouas	17 May 1983 (aged 19)	(Algeria) Youth system
4	(Algeria)		Fethi Reggad	10 December 1979 (aged 23)	(Algeria)
12	(Algeria)		Adel Messali	31 July 1983 (aged 19)	(Algeria) Youth system
Midfielders
	(Algeria)		Malik Zorgane	27 June 1965 (aged 37)	(Tunisia) US Monastir
	(Algeria)		Rafik Ghodbane	6 November 1978 (aged 24)	(Algeria)
7	(Algeria)		Djallal Achacha	22 February 1979 (aged 23)	(Algeria) CA Bordj Bou Arreridj
8	(Algeria)		Abdelghani Guenifi	17 April 1976 (aged 26)	(Algeria)
	(Algeria)		Zoubir Guenifi	30 April 1980 (aged 22)	(Algeria) USM Alger
6	(Algeria)		Laid Belhamel	12 November 1977 (aged 25)	(Algeria) Youth system
26	(Algeria)		Kheïreddine Madoui	27 March 1977 (aged 25)	(Algeria) CR Belouizdad
10	(Algeria)		Khaled Laâmeche	28 March 1981 (aged 21)	(Algeria) Youth system
	(Algeria)		Réda Mattem	28 May 1966 (aged 36)	(Algeria) CS Constantine
21	(Algeria)		Farès Bouzidi	7 March 1976 (aged 26)	(Algeria)
Forwards
9	(Algeria)		Farès Fellahi	13 May 1975 (aged 27)	(Algeria) MC Alger
19	(Algeria)		Mohamed Brahim Tercha	24 August 1981 (aged 21)	(Algeria) Youth system
17	(Algeria)		Tarek Keraghel	11 April 1981 (aged 21)	(Algeria) Youth system
16	(Algeria)		Mounir Bakrar	4 March 1984 (aged 18)	(Algeria) Youth system
13	(Algeria)		Abdenour Fertas	9 March 1981 (aged 21)	(Algeria)
	(Algeria)		Boubekeur Ighrenaissi	12 October 1973 (aged 29)	(Algeria)

== Competitions ==
=== Overview ===
Competition	Record								Started round	Final position / round	First match	Last match
Competition	G	W	D	L	GF	GA	GD	Win %	Started round	Final position / round	First match	Last match
National	30	10	9	11	32	36	−4	33.33	—N/a	7th	22 August 2002	12 May 2003
Algerian Cup	1	0	1	0	1	1	+0	0.00	Round of 64		2 March 2003	
Total	31	10	10	11	33	37	−4	32.26				

Updated to match played 3 June 2019
Source: Competitions

=== National ===
==== League table ====
Pos	Team	Pld	W	D	L	GF	GA	GD	Pts	Qualification or relegation
5	CR Belouizdad	30	12	9	9	28	20	+8	44 (Note: 1 point deducted)	2004 CAF Confederation Cup
6	MC Oran	30	11	10	9	41	40	+1	43	2003-04 Arab Champions League
7	ES Sétif	30	10	9	11	32	36	−4	39	
8	USM Annaba	30	9	12	9	31	33	−2	39	
9	RC Kouba	30	8	14	8	33	32	+1	38	

Updated to match(es) played on May 2014. Source: DZFoot
Rules for classification: 1) points; 2) goal difference; 3) number of goals scored.

==== Results summary ====
Overall								Home						Away					
Pld	W	D	L	GF	GA	GD	Pts	W	D	L	GF	GA	GD	W	D	L	GF	GA	GD
30	10	9	11	32	36	−4	39	8	5	2	22	12	+10	2	4	9	10	24	−14

Last updated: 22 April 2018.
Source: Competitive matches

==== Results by round ====
Round	1	2	3	4	5	6	7	8	9	10	11	12	13	14	15	16	17	18	19	20	21	22	23	24	25	26	27	28	29	30
Ground	A	H	A	A	H	A	H	A	H	A	H	A	H	A	H	H	A	H	H	A	H	A	H	A	H	A	H	A	H	A
Result	L	D	L	L	W	W	W	W	D	L	W	L	L	D	W	W	L	W	W	D	D	L	W	D	D	L	D	W	L	D
Position																														

Source: Competitive matches
A = Away; H = Home; W = Win; D = Draw; L = Loss

==== Matches ====
Win Draw Loss

22 August 2002 Round 1	ASM Oran	2–1	ES Sétif	Oran
14:30	Guesbaoui 46'; Berramla 65'	Report	Fellahi 84'	Stadium: Stade Habib Bouakeul; Referee: Mohamed Bichari

30 August 2002 Round 2	ES Sétif	1–1	NA Hussein Dey	Sétif
	Zorgane 45'		Alliche 36'	Stadium: Stade Mohamed Guessab; Referee: Touati Djaballah

12 September 2002 Round 3	CR Belouizdad	2–1	ES Sétif	Algiers
	Zazou 32'; Settara 54'		Laâmeche 23'	Stadium: Stade 20 Août 1955; Referee: Djamel Haimoudi

19 September 2002 Round 4	USM Blida	2–0	ES Sétif	Blida
	Badache 12'; Mehdaoui 84'	Report		Stadium: Stade Mustapha Tchaker; Referee: Salah Benamar
Note: Lineup for ES Sétif - Belhani, Mahfoudhi, Khaled, Bendriss, Kheïreddine Madoui, Belhamel, Keraghel, Guenifi, Fellahi (Bekrar 61'), Monir Madoui (Makhalfi 69'), Bouzidi (Zorgane 46') - Coach Boualem Charef.

3 October 2002 Round 5	ES Sétif	1–0	JSM Béjaïa	Sétif
	Mekhalfi 17'			Stadium: Stade 8 Mai 1945; Referee: Mohamed Amine Belhacène

14 October 2002 Round 6	JS Kabylie	1–0	ES Sétif	Tizi Ouzou
	Bendahmane 50'			Stadium: Stade du 1er Novembre 1954; Referee: Mohamed Haddada

17 October 2002 Round 7	ES Sétif	2–1	CA Batna	Sétif
	Khaled 44'; Fellahi 57'		Bouarara 73'	Stadium: Stade 8 Mai 1945; Referee: Farouk Ouchène

25 October 2002 Round 8	MC Oran	1–2	ES Sétif	Oran
	Haddou 7'	Report	Fellahi 4'; Bakrar 14'	Stadium: Stade Ahmed Zabana; Referee: Redouane Mehidi

31 October 2002 Round 9	ES Sétif	2–2	RC Kouba	Sétif
	Keraghel 35'; Fertas 70'		Bouferma 14'; Boussouar 52'	Stadium: Stade 8 Mai 1945; Referee: Mohamed Amine Benaissa

7 November 2002 Round 10	USM Alger	4–0	ES Sétif	Bologhine
	Ouichaoui 13'; Achiou 30'; Ammour 66'; Deghiche 78'			Stadium: Omar Hamadi Stadium; Referee: Mehdi Abdi

14 November 2002 Round 11	ES Sétif	4–0	CA Bordj Bou Arreridj	Sétif
	Fellahi 67', 87'; Achacha 73'; Guenifi 77'			Stadium: Stade 8 Mai 1945; Referee: Said Hirèche

21 November 2002 Round 12	ASO Chlef	3–1	ES Sétif	Chlef
	Zaoui 76', 80'; Koula 85'	Report	Tercha 75'	Stadium: Stade Maâmar Sahli; Referee: Ali Amrane
Note: Lineup for ES Sétif - Belhani, Mahfoudhi, Bendriss, Mekouas, Belhamel, Mesali, Achacha (Bekrar, 5’), Zoubir Guenifi (Mokdad, 46’), Fellahi, Keraghel, Tercha (Fertas, 86’) - Coach Boualem Charef.

10 December 2002 Round 13	ES Sétif	0–2	WA Tlemcen	Sétif
			El Aouni 13'; Meziani 89'	Stadium: Stade 8 Mai 1945; Referee: Smail Ounès

12 December 2002 Round 14	MO Constantine	1–1	ES Sétif	Constantine
	Azzizène 29'	Report	Fellahi 84'	Stadium: Ramadan Ben-Abdelmalek Stadium; Referee: Zaki Lahmar
Note: Lineup for ES Sétif - Douar, Mahfoudhi, Khaled, Makhalfi, Mesali (Zerfan), Zoubir Guenifi, Matam, Monir Madoui, Fertas (Keraghel), Ghodbane, Fellahi - Coach Said Hadj Mansour.

19 December 2002 Round 15	ES Sétif	1–0	USM Annaba	Sétif
	Fellahi 66'	Report		Stadium: Stade 8 Mai 1945; Referee: Mohamed Benouza

11 January 2003 Round 16	ES Sétif	1–0	ASM Oran	Sétif
	Fellahi 2'	Report		Stadium: Stade 8 Mai 1945; Referee: Samir Boubakour

16 January 2003 Round 17	NA Hussein Dey	1–0	ES Sétif	Hussein Dey
	Alliche 86'	Report		Stadium: Stade Frères Zioui; Referee: Djamel Haimoudi

20 January 2003 Round 18	ES Sétif	1–0	CR Belouizdad	Sétif
	Fellahi 82'			Stadium: Stade 8 Mai 1945; Referee: Brahim Seghir

30 January 2003 Round 19	ES Sétif	2–1	USM Blida	Sétif
	Laâmeche 15'; Fellahi 25'	Report	Galoul 42'	Stadium: Stade 8 Mai 1945; Referee: Touati Djaballah

4 February 2003 Round 20	JSM Béjaïa	0–0	ES Sétif	Béjaïa
				Stadium: Stade de l'Unité Maghrébine; Referee: Mokhtar Amalou

6 February 2003 Round 21	ES Sétif	1–1	JS Kabylie	Sétif
	Achacha 21'	Report	Amaouche 52'	Stadium: Stade 8 Mai 1945; Referee: Mohamed Benouza

17 February 2003 Round 22	CA Batna	2–0	ES Sétif	Batna
	Zouaghi 19'; Guidouh 85'			Stadium: Mustapha Seffouhi Stadium

24 February 2003 Round 23	ES Sétif	3–0	MC Oran	Sétif
	Achacha 3'; Laâmeche 30'; Fellahi 75'			Stadium: Stade 8 Mai 1945; Referee: Mohamed Bouali

6 March 2003 Round 24	RC Kouba	1–1	ES Sétif	Kouba
	Belgherbi 66'	Report	Fellahi 46'	Stadium: Stade Omar Benhaddad; Referee: Mohamed Benouza
Note: Lineup for ES Sétif - Belhani, Mahfoudhi, Khaled, Bendriss, Mesali, Belhamel, Kheïreddine Madoui, Achacha, Fellahi, Tercha (Bekrar 87’), Keraghel - Coach Said Hadj Mansour.

20 March 2003 Round 25	ES Sétif	0–0	USM Alger	Sétif
		Report		Stadium: Stade 8 Mai 1945; Referee: Houari Belkacem
Note: Lineup for ES Sétif - Douar, Mahfoudhi, Tercha (Khaled 57’), Bendriss (Makhalfi 50’), Mesali, Belhamel, Kheïreddine Madoui, Achacha, Fellahi, Laâmeche, Keraghel - Coach Said Hadj Mansour.

3 April 2003 Round 26	CA Bordj Bou Arreridj	2–0	ES Sétif	Bordj Bou Arreridj
	Djaref 48'; Houari 67'	Report		Stadium: Stade 20 Août 1955; Referee: Mohamed Zekrini

10 April 2003 Round 27	ES Sétif	0–0	ASO Chlef	Sétif
				Stadium: Stade 8 Mai 1945; Referee: Redouane Mehidi

5 May 2003 Round 28	WA Tlemcen	0–1	ES Sétif	Tlemcen
			Keraghel 85'	Stadium: Stade Akid Lotfi; Referee: Mohamed Haddada

8 May 2003 Round 29	ES Sétif	3–4	MO Constantine	Sétif
	Fellahi 13', 73'; Mekhalfi 70'	Report	Azizane 23'; Boulemdaïs 47', 82'; Bouaicha 90'	Stadium: Stade 8 Mai 1945; Referee: Samir Boubakour

12 May 2003 Round 30	USM Annaba	2–2	ES Sétif	Annaba
	Athmani 44'; Bensaïd 90'		Fellahi 60'; Guenifi 81'	Stadium: Stade 19 Mai 1956; Referee: Mohamed Cherchar

== Algerian Cup ==
2 March 2003 Round of 64	ES Sétif	1–1 (a.e.t.) (4–5 p)	SA Mohammadia	Blida
	Mahfoudhi 4'		Laaroussi 90'	Stadium: Stade Mustapha Tchaker
Note: Lineup for ES Sétif -

== Squad information ==
=== Playing statistics ===
No.	Pos	Nat	Player	Total		National 1		Algerian Cup	
No.	Pos	Nat	Player	Apps	Goals	Apps	Goals	Apps	Goals
Goalkeepers
1	GK	(Algeria) ALG	Rafi Douar	11	0	11	0	0	0
18	GK	(Algeria) ALG	Ammar Belhani	17	0	17	0	0	0
	GK	(Algeria) ALG	Sofiane Mechoug	1	0	1	0	0	0
Defenders
20	DF	(Algeria) ALG	Abdenour Mahfoudhi	25	0	25	0	0	0
14	DF	(Algeria) ALG	Smail Khaled	19	1	19	1	0	0
5	DF	(Algeria) ALG	Réda Bendriss	17	0	17	0	0	0
22	DF	(Algeria) ALG	Monir Madoui	22	0	22	0	0	0
25	MF	(Algeria) ALG	Farés Makhalfi	21	2	21	2	0	0
	DF	(Algeria) ALG	Hacéne Megouas	8	0	8	0	0	0
4	DF	(Algeria) ALG	Fethi Reggad	6	0	6	0	0	0
12	DF	(Algeria) ALG	Adel Messali	19	0	19	0	0	0
Midfielders
	MF	(Algeria) ALG	Malik Zorgane	13	1	13	1	0	0
	MF	(Algeria) ALG	Mohamed Mokdad	4	0	4	0	0	0
	MF	(Algeria) ALG	Rafik Ghodbane	10	0	10	0	0	0
7	FW	(Algeria) ALG	Djallal Achacha	22	3	22	3	0	0
8	MF	(Algeria) ALG	Abdelghani Guenifi	13	1	13	1	0	0
8	DF	(Algeria) ALG	Zoubir Guenifi	13	1	13	1	0	0
6	MF	(Algeria) ALG	Laid Belhamel	24	0	24	0	0	0
26	MF	(Algeria) ALG	Kheïreddine Madoui	10	0	10	0	0	0
10	FW	(Algeria) ALG	Khaled Laâmeche	14	3	14	3	0	0
	MF	(Algeria) ALG	Réda Mattem	7	0	7	0	0	0
21	MF	(Algeria) ALG	Farès Bouzidi	4	0	4	0	0	0
Forwards
9	FW	(Algeria) ALG	Farès Fellahi	28	15	28	15	0	0
19	FW	(Algeria) ALG	Mohamed Brahim Tercha	15	1	15	1	0	0
17	FW	(Algeria) ALG	Tarek Keraghel	19	2	19	2	0	0
16	FW	(Algeria) ALG	Mounir Bakrar	20	1	20	1	0	0
13	FW	(Algeria) ALG	Abdenour Fertas	14	1	14	1	0	0
	FW	(Algeria) ALG	Boubekeur Ighrenaissi	3	0	3	0	0	0
	FW	(Algeria) ALG	Toufik Benttoumi	0	0	0	0	0	0
Players transferred out during the season

Last updated: 19 November 2017

=== Goalscorers ===
Includes all competitive matches. The list is sorted alphabetically by surname when total goals are equal.

No.	Nat.	Player	Pos.	N 1	AC	TOTAL
9	(Algeria)	Farès Fellahi	FW	15	0	15
7	(Algeria)	Djallal Achacha	MF	3	0	3
10	(Algeria)	Khaled Laâmeche	MF	3	0	3
17	(Algeria)	Tarek Keraghel	FW	2	0	2
25	(Algeria)	Farés Makhalfi	DF	2	0	2
14	(Algeria)	Smail Khaled	DF	1	0	1
	(Algeria)	Malik Zorgane	MF	1	0	1
8	(Algeria)	Abdelghani Guenifi	MF	1	0	1
	(Algeria)	Zoubir Guenifi	MF	1	0	1
19	(Algeria)	Mohamed Brahim Tercha	FW	1	0	1
16	(Algeria)	Mounir Bakrar	FW	1	0	1
13	(Algeria)	Abdenour Fertas	FW	1	0	1
20	(Algeria)	Abdenour Mahfoudhi	DF	0	1	1
Own Goals				0	0	0
Totals				32	1	33
