= Taibbi =

Taibbi is a surname. Notable people with the surname include:

- Matt Taibbi (born 1970), American author, journalist, and podcaster
- Mike Taibbi (born c. 1949), American television journalist

== See also ==
- Taibi
