= Billal Zouani =

Algerian footballer (born 1969)

Personal information
- Full name: Billal Zouani
- Date of birth: December 11, 1969 (age 56)
- Place of birth: Blida, Algeria
- Height: 1.78 m (5 ft 10 in)
- Position: Striker

Senior career*
Years	Team	Apps	(Gls)
1987–2001	USM Blida		
2001–2001	Atlantis FC	9	(2)
2001–2008	USM Blida	138	(24)

International career
1997–2001	Algeria	16	(?)
- * Club domestic league appearances and goals

Billal Zouani (born December 11, 1969) is a retired Algerian international footballer. He played as a striker.

== Club career ==
Zouani spent his entire career with USM Blida in the Algerian Championnat National apart from a brief stint in Finland with Atlantis FC in 2001.

== International career ==
Zouani made 16 appearances for the Algerian National Team. He was a member of the team at the 1998 African Cup of Nations in Burkina Faso.

== Career statistics ==
Club	Season	League			Cup		League Cup		Other		Total	
Club	Season	Division	Apps	Goals	Apps	Goals	Apps	Goals	Apps	Goals	Apps	Goals
USM Blida	1988–89	Division 2					—		—			
USM Blida	1989–90	Division 2		2			—		—			
USM Blida	1990–92	Division 2		8			—		—			
USM Blida	1991–92	Division 2		7			—		—			
USM Blida	1992–93	Division 1		8			—		—			
USM Blida	1993–94	Division 1		5		2	—		—			
USM Blida	1994–95	Division 1		7		1	—		—			
USM Blida	1995–96	Division 1		6		1			—			
USM Blida	1996–97	Division 2		12		2	—					
USM Blida	1997–98	Division 1		0				4	—			
USM Blida	1998–99	Division 1		6			—		—			
USM Blida	1999–00	Division 1		8		1			—			
USM Blida	2000–01	Division 1	23	12	1	0	—		—			
USM Blida	2001–02	Division 1	22	6	5	1	—		—			
USM Blida	2002–03	Division 1	23	2	1	0	—		—			
USM Blida	2003–04	Division 1	16	2	1	0	—					
USM Blida	2004–05	Division 1	26	5	4	2	—		—			
USM Blida	2005–06	Division 1	22	6	1	0	—		—			
USM Blida	2006–07	Division 1	24	3	5	2	—		—			
USM Blida	2007–08	Division 1	5	0	0	0	—		—			
Atlantis	2001	Veikkausliiga	9	2	—		—		—		9	2
Career total			0	105	0	12	0	0	0	0	0	+117
