= Taibi =

Taibi is a surname. Notable people with the surname include:

- Joe Taibi (born 1963), American football player
- Massimo Taibi (born 1970), Italian football goalkeeper
- Rami Bin Said Al Taibi, Saudi Arabian held in extrajudicial detention in the United States Guantanamo Bay detainment camps
- Waniss Taïbi (born 2002), French football midfielder

== See also ==
- Taibbi
