= Mouloud Belatrèche =

Algerian footballer (born 1976)

Personal information
- Full name: Mouloud Belatrèche
- Date of birth: March 10, 1976 (age 50)
- Place of birth: Médéa, Algeria
- Height: 1.76 m (5 ft 9 1/2 in)
- Position: Midfielder

Senior career*
Years	Team	Apps	(Gls)
1994–2000	Olympique de Médéa	?	(?)
2000–2003	JSM Béjaïa	17	(4)
2003–2004	USM Blida	13	(1)
2004–2007	JSM Béjaïa	?	(?)
2007–2008	RC Kouba	33	(5)
2008–2010	JSM Béjaïa	44	(0)
2010–2011	Olympique de Médéa	?	(3)
2011–2013	CA Bordj Bou Arreridj	10	(2)
Total		140+	(18+)
- * Club domestic league appearances and goals as of 7 December 2024

Mouloud Belatrèche (born 10 March 1976) is a retired Algerian professional footballer. He primarily played as a midfielder and spent the majority of his career in Algeria's domestic leagues. Since retiring, Belatrèche has been involved in local football development and coaching initiatives in Médéa.

== Club career ==
=== Olympique de Médéa ===
Belatrèche signed for Olympique de Médéa in the summer of 2010, marking his second stint with the club from JSM Béjaïa. On 17 December 2010, he scored his first goal since returning to his hometown club in the eighty-first minute against NA Hussein Dey. However, he was sent off in the eighty-fifth minute.

Belatrèche continued to play for Olympique de Médéa until 2011, after which he joined CA Bordj Bou Arreridj to conclude his playing career. Over his career, he gained recognition for his leadership on and off the pitch.

=== Post-retirement activities ===
Following his retirement in 2013, Belatrèche shifted his focus to youth football development in Médéa. He established local training camps for aspiring footballers and worked to improve the standard of grassroots football in the region. His contributions to the local community have been praised, particularly his efforts to provide opportunities for underprivileged youth.

== Statistics ==
Club performance			League		Cup		Continental		Total	
Season	Club	League	Apps	Goals	Apps	Goals	Apps	Goals	Apps	Goals
2003–04	USM Blida	Championnat National 1	13	1	0	0	7	0	20	1
2007–08	RC Kouba	Championnat National 2	33	5	2	1	-		35	7
2008–09	JSM Béjaïa	Championnat National	23	0	0	0	-		23	0
2009–10	JSM Béjaïa	Championnat National	21	0	1	0	-		22	0
2010–11	Olympique de Médéa	Ligue 2	-	3	0	0	-		-	3
2011–12	CA Bordj Bou Arreridj	Ligue 2	10	2	1	0	-		11	2
Total	Algeria		140+	18+	4	1	7	0	151+	19+
