= Abdelkader Benayada =

Algerian footballer (born 1982)

Personal information
- Full name: Abdelkader Benayada
- Date of birth: 5 May 1982 (age 44)
- Place of birth: Frenda, Algeria
- Position: Defender

Team information
- Current team: MC Saïda
- Number: 6

Senior career*
Years	Team	Apps	(Gls)
1993–2004	ASM Oran	-	(-)
2004–2008	USM Blida	-	(-)
2008–2009	MC Oran	-	(-)
2009–2011	USM Alger	36	(0)
2011–2012	MO Constantine	?	(?)
2012–2013	CA Batna	?	(?)
2013–2014	USM Bel Abbès	?	(?)
2014–2016	USM Blida	29	(0)
2016–	MC Saida	?	(?)

International career
2003–2004	Algeria U23	8	(0)
- * Club domestic league appearances and goals as of 00:00, 1 August 2011

Abdelkader Benayada (born 5 May 1982) is an Algerian footballer who plays for MC Saïda in the Algerian Ligue Professionnelle 2.

== Club career ==
On 9 June 2009 Benayada signed a two-year contract with USM Alger.

== International career ==
Benayada was a member of the Algerian Under-23 National Team in 2003 and 2004. He played at the 2003 All-Africa Games in Nigeria and in the qualifiers for the 2004 Summer Olympics, making a total of 8 appearances.
