= Amadou Tidiane Tall =

Burkinabé football player

Amadou Tidiane Tall (born 22 June 1975, in Kadiogo) is a Burkinabé football player who last played for Etoile Filante Ouagadougou.

Tall previously played for USM Blida in the Algerian Championnat National.

He was part of the Burkinabé 2004 African Nations Cup team that finished bottom of their group in the first round of competition, thus failing to secure qualification for the quarter-finals.

- 1998–2003 Etoile Filante Ouagadougou
- 2003–2006 USM Blida
- 2006–present Etoile Filante Ouagadougou
