= Zoubir Zmit =

Algerian footballer (born 1975)

Personal information
- Full name: Zoubir Zmit
- Date of birth: June 11, 1975 (age 51)
- Place of birth: Meftah, Algeria
- Height: 1.70 m (5 ft 7 in)
- Position: Midfielder

Senior career*
Years	Team	Apps	(Gls)
1994–1999	SKAF El Khemis	-	(-)
1999–2003	RC Kouba	-	(-)
2003–2005	USM Blida	56	(6)
2005–2008	MC Alger	60	(1)
2008–2009	USM Blida	41	(2)
2009–2010	MC Oran	28	(0)
2010–2012	CS Constantine	-	(-)
2012–2013	MO Constantine	-	(0)
2013–2014	AS Khroub	27	(1)
2014–2015	ESM Koléa	28	(3)
- * Club domestic league appearances and goals

Zoubir Zmit (Arabic: زبير زميت; born June 11, 1975) is an Algerian football player. He currently plays for MO Constantine in the Algerian Ligue Professionnelle 2.

== Club career ==
On August 14, 2010, Zmit joined CS Constantine, signing a contract with the club. In his first season with the club, he helped the club win the 2010–11 Algerian Ligue Professionnelle 2 and gain promotion back to the Algerian Ligue Professionnelle 1.

In 2013 Zmit was suspended for 3 months after he failed a drug test.

== Honours ==
- Won the Algerian Cup twice with MC Alger in 2006 and 2007
- Won the Algerian Super Cup twice with MC Alger in 2006 and 2007
- Won the Algerian Ligue Professionnelle 2 once with CS Constantine in 2011
