= Rezki Amrouche =

Algerian footballer and manager (born 1970)

Personal information
- Full name: Rezki Amrouche
- Date of birth: 17 November 1970 (age 55)
- Position: Defender

Senior career*
Years	Team	Apps	(Gls)
1992–1994	NA Hussein Dey	-	(-)
1994–1997	JS Kabylie	-	(-)
1997–2000	Club Africain	-	(-)
2000–2001	JS Kabylie	-	(-)
2001–2002	Stade Brest	-	(-)
2002–2004	USM Blida	-	(-)
2004–2005	JSM Béjaïa	-	(-)
2005–2006	OMR El Annasser	-	(-)

International career
1992–2000	Algeria	34	(2)

Managerial career
- 2011: Olympique de Médéa
- 2011–2012: USM Blida
- * Club domestic league appearances and goals

Rezki Amrouche (born 17 November 1970) is an Algerian football manager and former player. As a player, he played 34 times for the Algerian National Team, scoring 2 goals.

== Managerial career ==
On 24 October 2011 Amrouche was appointed as manager of Algerian Ligue Professionnelle 2 side USM Blida.

== Honours ==
Club:

- Won the Algerian League once with JS Kabylie in 1995
- Won the African Cup Winners Cup once with JS Kabylie in 1995
- Won the Arab Champions League once with Club Africain in 1997
- Won the Tunisia Cup twice with Club Africain in 1998
- Won the CAF Cup once with JS Kabylie in 2000
- Won the Algerian Second Division once with OMR El Annasser in 2006
- Finalist of the African Cup Winners Cup once with Club Africain in 1999

Country:

- Finalist at the 1993 Mediterranean Games in France
- Participated in the African Cup of Nations twice in 1996 and 2000 reaching the quarter-finals both times
