= El Hadi Fayçal Ouadah =

Algerian footballer (born 1983)

Personal information
- Full name: El Hadi Fayçal Ouadah
- Date of birth: September 24, 1983 (age 43)
- Place of birth: Blida, Algeria
- Height: 1.83 m (6 ft 0 in)
- Position: Goalkeeper

Team information
- Current team: AS Khroub
- Number: 1

Youth career
- 1996–2003: USM Alger

Senior career*
Years	Team	Apps	(Gls)
2003–2008	USM Blida	41	(0)
2008–2009	MC Saïda	31	(0)
2009–2012	USM Annaba	87	(0)
2012–2013	USM Bel-Abbès	11	(0)
2013–2014	CR Belouizdad	15	(0)
2014–2020	USM Blida	82	(0)
2020–	AS Khroub	0	(0)
- * Club domestic league appearances and goals

El Hadi Fayçal Ouadah (born September 24, 1983, in Blida, Algeria) is an Algerian football player who is currently playing as a goalkeeper for AS Khroub in the Algerian Ligue 2.

== Career statistics ==
=== Club ===
As of 25 June 2019

Club	Season	League			Cup		Total	
Club	Season	Division	Apps	Goals	Apps	Goals	Apps	Goals
USM Blida	2014–15	Ligue 1	7	0	2	0	9	0
USM Blida	2015–16	Ligue 1	23	0	1	0	24	0
USM Blida	2016–17	Ligue 2	2	0	4	0	6	0
USM Blida	2017–18	Ligue 1	13	0	2	0	15	0
USM Blida	2018–19	Ligue 2	16	0	2	0	18	0
USM Blida	2019–20	LNFA 3	21	0	1	0	22	0
Career total			82	0	12	0	94	0
