= Smaïl Diss =

Algerian footballer (born 1976)

Personal information
- Full name: Smaïl Diss
- Date of birth: 2 December 1976 (age 49)
- Place of birth: Mostaganem, Algeria
- Height: 1.85 m (6 ft 1 in)
- Position: Defender

Youth career
- 1996–1999: ES Mostaganem

Senior career*
Years	Team	Apps	(Gls)
1999–2001	ES Mostaganem	47	(3)
2001–2005	USM Blida	131	(12)
2005	Sivasspor	0	(0)
2005–2008	USM Blida	78	(7)
2008–2012	ES Sétif	127	(9)
2012–2013	USM Bel-Abbès	12	(0)

International career
2001–2006	Algeria	11	(0)
- * Club domestic league appearances and goals

Smaïl Diss (born 2 December 1976) in Mostaganem is an Algerian former football player.

== Honours ==
- Won the Algerian Cup once with ES Sétif in 2012

== National team statistics ==
Algeria national team
Year	Apps	Goals
2001	1	0
2002	2	0
2003	4	0
2004	0	0
2005	3	0
2006	1	0
Total	11	0
