= Mohamed Khazrouni =

Algerian former footballer (born 1969)

Personal information
- Date of birth: 18 March 1969 (age 57)
- Place of birth: El Affroun, Algeria
- Height: 1.79 m (5 ft 10 in)
- Positions: Midfielder; defender

Team information
- Current team: MC Alger (club director)

Senior career*
Years	Team	Apps	(Gls)
1987–1993	NCB El Affroun		
1993–1996	MC Alger	68	(2)
1996–1999	USM Blida	60	(8)
1999–2000	USM Alger	9	(0)
2000–2001	USM Blida	24	(0)
2001	Atlantis	7	(1)
2001–2004	USM Blida	51	(4)

International career
1998	Algeria	4	(0)

Managerial career
- 2023–: MC Alger (club director)
- * Club domestic league appearances and goals

Mohamed Khazrouni (Arabic: محمد الخزروني; born 18 March 1969) is an Algerian former professional footballer who played as a midfielder. He was capped four times for the Algeria national team in 1998. He is currently the club director of MC Alger.

== Career statistics ==
As of 4 November 1998

Appearances and goals by national team and year
National team	Year	Apps	Goals
Algeria	1998	4	0
Total		4	0
