= Benhalima Rouane =

Algerian footballer (born 1979)

Personal information
- Full name: Benhalima Rouane
- Date of birth: February 28, 1979 (age 47)
- Place of birth: Frenda, Algeria
- Height: 1.80 m (5 ft 11 in)
- Position: Striker

Senior career*
Years	Team	Apps	(Gls)
1998–1999	SC Mecheria		
1999–2001	USM El Harrach		
2001–2002	JSM Tiaret		
2002–2005	USM Blida	77	(7)
2005–2006	USM El Harrach		
2006–2007	ASM Oran	18	(3)
2007–2008	AS Khroub	25	(5)
2008–2009	CA Bordj Bou Arreridj	23	(5)
2009–2016	MO Constantine		

International career
2003	Algeria	3	(0)
- * Club domestic league appearances and goals

Benhalima Rouane (born February 28, 1979) is an Algerian football player.

== National team statistics ==
Algeria national team
Year	Apps	Goals
2003	3	0
Total	3	0
