= Salah Samadi =

Algerian footballer (born 1976)

Personal information
- Full name: Salah Mohamed Samadi
- Date of birth: September 16, 1976 (age 50)
- Place of birth: Hussein Dey, Algiers, Algeria
- Height: 1.84 m (6 ft 1/2 in)
- Position: Goalkeeper

Senior career*
Years	Team	Apps	(Gls)
1998–2000	JS Bordj Ménaïel	-	(-)
2000–2008	USM Blida	214	(0)
2008–2010	WR Bentalha	-	(-)

International career
2002	Algeria	2	(0)
- * Club domestic league appearances and goals

Salah Mohamed Samadi (born September 16, 1976) is a former Algerian international football player. He spent the majority of his career with USM Blida and has two caps for the Algeria national team.

== National team statistics ==
Algeria national team
Year	Apps	Goals
2002	2	0
Total	2	0
