= Samir Galloul =

Algerian footballer (born 1976)

Personal information
- Full name: Samir Galloul
- Date of birth: October 18, 1976 (age 50)
- Place of birth: Bouzaréah, Algeria
- Height: 1.80 m (5 ft 11 in)
- Position: Defender

Team information
- Current team: NA Hussein Dey

Senior career*
Years	Team	Apps	(Gls)
1995–1999	JS Bordj		
1999–2005	USM Blida	133	(16)
2005–2006	USM El Harrach		
2006–2008	MC Alger	41	(0)
2008–2011	NA Hussein Dey	30	(0)

International career^{‡}
2000–2003	Algeria	3	(0)
- * Club domestic league appearances and goals as of July 2009 ‡ National team caps and goals as of November 2009

Samir Galloul (born October 18, 1976, in Oran, Bouzaréah) is an Algerian footballer. He currently plays for NA Hussein Dey in the Algerian Championnat National.
