= Mohamed Badache =

Algerian footballer (born 1976)

Personal information
- Date of birth: 15 October 1976 (age 50)
- Place of birth: Algeria
- Position: Forward

Senior career*
Years	Team	Apps	(Gls)
1995–1999	RC Arbâa		
1999–2000	ES Sétif		
2000–2005	USM Blida	109	(37)
2005–2007	MC Alger	50	(15)
2008	ES Sétif		

International career
2004	Algeria	3	(0)
- * Club domestic league appearances and goals

Mohamed Badache (Arabic: محمد بعداش; born 15 October 1976 in Hussein Dey, Alger) is an Algerian footballer. He last played as a forward for ES Sétif in the Algerian Championnat National.

== National team statistics ==
Algeria national team
Year	Apps	Goals
2004	3	0
Total	3	0

== Honours ==
- Won the Algerian Cup twice with MC Alger in 2006 and 2007
- Won the Algerian Super Cup twice with MC Alger in 2006 and 2007
- Won the Arab Champions League once with ES Sétif in 2008
