= 2001–02 USM Blida season =

USM Blida
2001–02 season
- Chairman: Mohamed Zaïm
- Head coach: (Palestine) Said Hadj Mansour
- Stadium: Mustapha Tchaker Stadium
- National 1: 13th
- Algerian Cup: Round of 32
- Top goalscorer: League: Kamel Kherkhache (13 goals); All: Kamel Kherkhache (14 goals)
Home colours	Away colours

In the 2001–02 season, in Algerian football, USM Blida is competing in the National 1 for the 17th season, as well as the Algerian Cup. They will be competing in Ligue 1, and the Algerian Cup.

== Competitions ==
=== Overview ===
Competition	Record								Started round	Final position / round	First match	Last match
Competition	G	W	D	L	GF	GA	GD	Win %	Started round	Final position / round	First match	Last match
National 1	30	10	8	12	37	28	+9	33.33	—	4th	30 August 2001	1 July 2002
Algerian Cup	5	3	1	1	7	4	+3	60.00	Round of 64	Semi-finals	14 March 2002	27 June 2002
Total	35	13	9	13	44	32	+12	37.14				

Updated to match played 4 April 2020
Source: Competitions

=== National ===
==== League table ====
Pos	Team	Pld	W	D	L	GF	GA	GD	Pts	Qualification or relegation
11	JSM Béjaïa	30	9	11	10	21	27	−6	38	
12	CA Batna	30	10	7	13	25	29	−4	37	
13	USM Blida	30	10	8	12	37	28	+9	38	
14	RC Kouba	30	9	7	14	33	35	−2	34	
15	MC Alger (R)	30	7	13	10	27	33	−6	34	2002-03 Division 2

Source: rsssf
Rules for classification: 1) points; 2) goal difference; 3) number of goals scored.
(R) Relegated

=== Results summary ===
Overall								Home						Away					
Pld	W	D	L	GF	GA	GD	Pts	W	D	L	GF	GA	GD	W	D	L	GF	GA	GD
30	10	8	12	37	28	+9	38	9	3	3	28	12	+16	1	5	9	9	16	−7

Last updated: June 2001.
Source: Competitive matches

=== Results by round ===
Round	1	2	3	4	5	6	7	8	9	10	11	12	13	14	15	16	17	18	19	20	21	22	23	24	25	26	27	28	29	30
Ground	H	A	H	A	A	H	A	H	A	H	A	H	A	H	A	A	H	A	H	H	A	H	A	H	A	H	A	H	A	H
Result	D	L	L	D	L	W	L	D	L	W	W	W	D	W	L	L	L	D	W	D	L	W	D	W	D	W	L	W	L	L
Position	15	15	16	16	16	15	16	16	16	16	15	14	13	9	14	14	15	15	15	14	15	12	13	10	11	9	12	9	12	13

Updated to match(es) played on 27 May 2001. Source: Competitive matches
A = Away; H = Home; W = Win; D = Draw; L = Loss

=== Matches ===
Win Draw Loss

30 August 2001 Round 1	USM Blida	0–0	USM Alger	Blida
15:00	Khazrouni (yellow card); Harkas (yellow card)	Report	Ghazi (yellow card)	Stadium: Mustapha Tchaker Stadium; Attendance: 20.000; Referee: Abdi, Akrour, Lelouchi
Note: Lineup for USM Blida - Samadi - Krebaza (Amrouche 38'), Drali, Diss, Galoul S. - Harkas, Bakir, Khazrouni, Benhadji (Djeddou 71') - Galoul A. (Badache, 66'), Zouani B. (cap.) – Coach: Chaâbane Merzekane

13 September 2001 Round 2	USM Blida	0–1	JSM Béjaïa	Blida
15:00	Belhadj (yellow card) 28'; Krebaza (yellow card) 88'	Report	Amaouche 85'; Belmellat (yellow card) 24'; Mouza (yellow card) 50'; Habri (yellow card) 89'	Stadium: Mustapha Tchaker Stadium; Attendance: 15.000; Referee: Djaballah kord, Bakir, Ouanas
Note: Lineup for USM Blida - Samadi - Ait Mokhtar (Galoul A. 60') - Belouaham, Diss, Galoul Samir, Harkas, Bakir, Khazrouni (Krebaza 70'), Badache, Belhadj (Djeddou 46'), Zouani – Coach: Chaâbane Merzekane

18 September 2001 Round 3	CR Belouizdad	1–0	USM Blida	Algiers
15:00	Mezouar 50'; Talis (yellow card) 37'; Settara (yellow card) 54'; Ali Moussa (yellow card) 85'	Report	Samadi (yellow card) 32'; Galloul Amar (yellow card) 34'; Badache (yellow card) 42'	Stadium: August 20, 1955 Stadium; Attendance: 10.000; Referee: Lahmer, Talbi, Cherrit.
Note: Lineup for USM Blida - Samadi - Krebaza, Drali, Diss, Galoul S. - Harkas, Bakir, Khazrouni (Belhadj, 62'), Badache - Galoul A., Zouani – Coach: Said Hadj Mansour

20 September 2001 Round 4	CA Batna	0–0	USM Blida	Batna
15:00	Derghal (yellow card) 51'; Benhassane (yellow card) 85'	Report	Galoul S. (yellow card) 2'; Aït Mokhtar (yellow card) 30'; Diss (yellow card) 74'	Stadium: Mustapha Seffouhi Stadium; Attendance: 5.000; Referee: Belkacem, Ouakili, Belfekroune.
Note: Lineup for USM Blida - Samadi - Krebaza, Drali, Diss, Galoul S. - Harkas, Bakir (Boucham, 88'), Aït Mokhtar (Benhadj, 61'), Badache - Galoul A. (Aoun Seghir, 74'), Zouani B. – Coach: Said Hadj Mansour

28 September 2001 Round 5	JS Kabylie	1–0	USM Blida	Tizi Ouzou
15:00	Boubrit 42'; Driouèche (yellow card) 28'; Benhamlat (red card) 46'	Report	Krebaza (red card) 46'	Stadium: November 1, 1954 Stadium; Attendance: 20.000; Referee: Seghir, Belfekroun, Ghenam.
Note: Lineup for USM Blida - Samadi - Krebaza, Drali, Diss, Galoul S. - Harkas, Aoun-Seghir, Aït Mokhtar (Kherkhache, 46'), Badache (Djeddou, 73') - Galoul A. (Belouahem, 53'), Zouani B. – Coach: Said Hadj Mansour

11 October 2001 Round 6	USM Blida	1–0	AS Ain M'lila	Blida
15:00	Kherkhache 45'; Drali (yellow card) 75'	Report	Izzaoui F. (yellow card) 73'; Benidir (yellow card) 90'	Stadium: Mustapha Tchaker Stadium; Attendance: 15.000; Referee: Benouzza, Oukil, Ouadah.
Note: Lineup for USM Blida - Samadi - Aoun Segheir, Drali, Harkas, Galoul S. - Aït Mokhtar, Bakir, Badache (Da Silva, 72'), De Oliviera (Galoul A., 84') - Kherkhache, Zouani. – Coach: Said Hadj Mansour

18 October 2001 Round 7	MC Oran	2–1	USM Blida	Oran
15:00	Daoud 41'; Farès El Aouni 67'; Kechamli (yellow card) 5'; Mazri (yellow card) 72'	Report	Kherkhache 59'; Diss (yellow card) 37'	Stadium: Ahmed Zabana Stadium; Attendance: 7.000; Referee: Lahmar, Sedrati, Khelifa.
Note: Lineup for USM Blida - Samadi - Aoun, Drali, Diss, Galoul S. - Harkas, Badache (Aït Mokhtar, 85'), Bakir, De Oliveira (Galoul A., 53') - Zouani B., Kherkhache. – Coach: Said Hadj Mansour

25 October 2001 Round 8	USM Blida	0–0	WA Tlemcen	Blida
15:00	Krebaza (yellow card) 34'; Drali (yellow card) 56'; Harkas (yellow card) 74'; Belouahem (yellow card) 82'	Report	Hadjou (yellow card) 35'; Meziani (yellow card) 41'; Kerbouche (yellow card) 50'; Kherris (yellow card) 56'; Bechlaghem (yellow card) 75'; Betouaf (yellow card) 76'	Stadium: Mustapha Tchaker Stadium; Attendance: 13.000; Referee: Ouchène, Derriche, Dréa.
Note: Lineup for USM Blida - Samadi - Krebaza, Drali (Belouahem, 66'), Diss, Galoul S. - Aoun Segheir, Bakir (Badache, 71'), Harkas, De Oliveira (Aït-Mokhtar, 89') - Kherkhache, Zouani B. – Coach: Said Hadj Mansour

2 November 2001 Round 9	MC Alger	2–1	USM Blida	Algiers
15:00	Bouras 36'; Faisca 85' (pen.); Bouamrane Larbi (yellow card) 36'; Fellahi (yellow card) 86'	Report	Kherkhache 62'; Aoun Seghir (yellow card); Kherkhache (yellow card)	Stadium: 5 July 1962; Referee: Benaissa, Belbecir, Lekhneèche
Note: Lineup for USM Blida - Samadi, Krebaza, Khazrouni (Belouaham 73'), Diss, Galoul Samir, Harkas, Aoun Seghir (Zouani 46'), Bakir, Kherkhache, De Oliveira, Badache.

22 November 2001 Round 10	USM Blida	3–1	RC Kouba	Blida
15:00	Diss 21'; Zouani B. 58', 87'; Diss (yellow card) 10'	Report	Belgherbi 16'; Djerradi (yellow card) 11'; Belmellat (yellow card) 45'	Stadium: Mustapha Tchaker Stadium; Attendance: 5.000; Referee: Benouza, Kaïd, Oukil.
Note: Lineup for USM Blida - Samadi - Belouahem, Aoun Segheir, Galoul S., Diss - Harkas, Drali (Bakir 56'), Badache (Aït-Mokhtar, 68') De Oliveira - Kherkhache (Djeddou, 85'), Zouani B. – Coach: Said Hadj Mansour

29 November 2001 Round 11	CA Bordj Bou Arreridj	2–4	USM Blida	Bordj Bou Arréridj
15:00	Saâdallah 46'; Bentayeb 87'; Deffaf (yellow card) 28'	Report	Kherkhache 1', 62', 77', 83'; Zouani (yellow card) 85'	Stadium: August 20, 1955 Stadium; Attendance: 4.000; Referee: Belkacem, assisté de M.Deffar et M.Ouaddah
Note: Lineup for USM Blida - Samadi - Krebaza, Belouahem, Diss, Galoul S. - Harkas, Badache (Bakir, 65'), Aoun Seghir (Galoul A., 80'), De Oliviera (Aït Mokhtar, 70') - Kherkhache, Zouani B. – Coach: Said Hadj Mansour

14 December 2001 Round 12	USM Blida	2–1	MO Constantine	Blida
15:00	Badache 46'; Kherkhache 60'; Krebaza (yellow card) 27'; Diss (yellow card) 50'; Aoun Seghir (yellow card) 69'	Report	Azzizene 57'; Khenouf (yellow card) 12'; Bensahnoune (yellow card) 31'; Bouaza (yellow card) 51'	Stadium: Mustapha Tchaker Stadium; Attendance: 10.000; Referee: Djaballah, Koubakir, Ghazli.
Note: Lineup for USM Blida - Samadi - Krebaza (Drali), Belouahem, Diss, (Khazrouni), Galoul S. - Badèche (Aït Mokhtar), Harkas, Aoun Seghir, De Olivera - Kherkhache, Zouani B. – Coach: Said Hadj Mansour

20 December 2001 Round 13	ES Sétif	1–1	USM Blida	Sétif
15:00	Guenifi N. 20'; Fellahi (yellow card) 62'	Report	Aït Mokhtar 84'; Drali (yellow card) 72'	Stadium: Stade 8 Mai 1945; Attendance: 8.000; Referee: Badache, Mahmoud, Sakker.
Note: Lineup for USM Blida - Samadi - Krebaza, Belouahem, Drali, Galoul S. - Badache (Djeddou, 85'), Harkas, Aoun Seghir, De Oliviera - Kherkhache (Aït Mokhtar, 57'), Zouani (cap) (Baïd, 73'). – Coach: Said Hadj Mansour

3 January 2002 Round 14	ASM Oran	1–0	USM Blida	Oran
15:00	Deham 32'; Mekki (yellow card) 81'	Report	Krebaza (yellow card) 11'; Drali (yellow card) 70'; Samadi (yellow card) 70'	Stadium: Habib Bouakeul Stadium; Attendance: 12.000; Referee: Lazzoun, Belatrèche, Haïmoudi.
Note: Lineup for USM Blida - Samadi - Krebaza (Khazrouni, 85'), Belouahem, Diss (Drali 22'), Galoul S. - Badache, (Aït Mokhtar 51'), Harkas, Bakir, De Oliveira - Kherkhache, Zouani – Coach: Said Hadj Mansour

7 January 2002 Round 15	USM Blida	5–1	USM Annaba	Blida
15:00	Bakir 2'; Kherkhache 31', 85', 90+3'; Aït Mokhtar 86'; Zouani (yellow card) 34'; Drali (yellow card) 45'	Report	Amrane 81'; Ouichaoui M. (yellow card) 78'; Junior (yellow card) 52'	Stadium: Mustapha Tchaker Stadium; Attendance: 12.000; Referee: Boubakeur, Mezouar, Zinet.
Note: Lineup for USM Blida - Samadi - Krebaza, Belouahem (Khazrouni, 54'), Drali, Galoul - Aoun Segheir (Badache, 58'), Harkas, Bakir (Aït Mokhtar, 63'), De Oliveira - Kherkhache, Zouani. – Coach: Said Hadj Mansour

7 February 2002 Round 16	USM Alger	1–0	USM Blida	Algiers
15:00	Benchergui 74'; Zeghdoud (yellow card) 35'; Hadj Adlene (yellow card) 47'; Achiou (yellow card) 67'	Report	Belouahem (yellow card) 17'; Harkas (yellow card) 26'; Drali (yellow card) 55'	Stadium: Omar Hamadi Stadium; Attendance: 12.000; Referee: Djabbalah, Lounés, Kourdbakir.
Note: Lineup for USM Blida - Samadi - Krebaza, Belouahem, Diss, Amrouche (Drali, 46'), Galoul - Harkas, Aoune, De Oliveira - Zouani (Domingos, 60'), Kherkhache (Aït Mokhtar, 70'). – Coach: Said Hadj Mansour

14 February 2002 Round 17	USM Blida	2–4	CR Belouizdad	Blida
15:00	Badache 40'; Aït Mokhtar 92'; Krebaza (yellow card) 15' (yellow-red card) 22'; Galloul S. (yellow card) 61'; Badache (yellow card) 63'	Report	Mezouar 16'; Ali Moussa 21', 75'; Bakhti 31'; Bakhti (yellow card) 58'; Bakhti (yellow card) 70'	Stadium: Mustapha Tchaker Stadium; Attendance: 20.000; Referee: Moualeff, Sedrati, Chadli.
Note: Lineup for USM Blida - Samadi - Krebaza, Belouahem, Diss, Galloul - Harkas, Bakir (Aït Mokhtar, 46'), Aoun Segheir, Badache (Domingos, 78'), Di Oliveira - Kherkhache (Baïd, 78'). – Coach: Said Hadj Mansour

18 February 2002 Round 18	JSM Béjaïa	0–0	USM Blida	Béjaïa
15:00	Y. Amaouche (yellow card) 45'; Boudehouche (yellow card) 62'; Bouaoun (yellow card) 83'	Report	Aït Mokhtar (yellow card) 4'; Aoun Seghir (yellow card) 60'; Galoul S. (yellow card) 68'	Stadium: Maghrebi Unity Stadium; Attendance: 5.000; Referee: Benchana, Bourayou, Khelifatni
Note: Lineup for USM Blida - Messaï - Aït Mokhtar (Belouahem, 61'), Drali, Amrouche R., Galoul S. (cap) - Harkas, Bakir, Aoun Seghir, De Oliveira - Badache (Djeddou, 81'), Zouani. – Coach: Said Hadj Mansour

25 February 2002 Round 19	USM Blida	4–0	CA Batna	Blida
15:00	Kherkhache 1'; Zouani 60'; De Oliveira 75'; Badache 85' (yellow card) 32'	Report		Stadium: Mustapha Tchaker Stadium; Attendance: 10.000; Referee: Sebbagh, Zinet, Seghir
Note: Lineup for USM Blida - Messaï - Badache, Drali (Khanfsi, 84'), Amrouche R., Diss - Harkas (Baïd, 80'), Bakir (Khazrouni, 11'), Aoun Segheir, De Oliveira - Kherkhache, Zouani. – Coach: Said Hadj Mansour

7 March 2002 Round 20	JS Kabylie	0–0	USM Blida	Tizi Ouzou
15:00	Bendahmane (yellow card) 52'; Maghraoui (yellow card) 60'; Bezzaz (yellow card) 64'	Report	Belouahem (yellow card) 12'	Stadium: November 1, 1954 Stadium; Attendance: 30.000; Referee: Belkacem, Daouadji, Ouafed.
Note: Lineup for USM Blida - Messaï - Galoul S., Belouahem, (Khazrouni, 86'), Amrouche R., Diss - Harkas, Aït Mokhtar (Bakir, 61'), Aoun Seghir, De Oliveira - Kherkhache (Baïd, 86'), Zouani B.(cap.) – Coach: Said Hadj Mansour

22 March 2002 Round 21	AS Ain M'lila	1–0	USM Blida	Chelghoum Laïd
15:00	Izzaoui F. 51' (pen.); Bacha (yellow card) 23' (yellow-red card) 61'; Izzaoui F. (yellow card) 29'; Bentouil (yellow card) 74'	Report	Aït Mokhtar (yellow card) 30'; Belouahem (yellow card) 50'	Stadium: Stade du 11 Décembre 1981; Attendance: 4.000; Referee: Hirèche assisté de MM. Zeid et Souffi.
Note: Lineup for USM Blida - Samadi - Belouahem (Krebaza, 66'), Khazrouni, Amrouche R., Diss - Harkas, Badache (Baïd, 74'), Aït Mokhtar, De Oliveira - Kherkhache, Zouani. – Coach: Said Hadj Mansour

11 April 2002 Round 22	USM Blida	2–1	MC Oran	Blida
15:00	Galloul S. (yellow card) 26'; Kherkhache (yellow card) 42'; Diss 51'; Djeddou (yellow card) 65'; Zouani B. 90'	Report	Haddou (yellow card) 26'; Benzerga 55'; Moumène (yellow card) 87'	Stadium: Mustapha Tchaker Stadium; Attendance: 15.000; Referee: Boubakeur, Tahir, Lamini.
Note: Lineup for USM Blida - Samadi - Krebaza, Khazrouni, Diss, Amrouche R. - Aoun Séghir, Badache (Djeddou, 80'), Galoul S., De Oliveira (Aït Mokhtar, 60') - Kherkhache (Bakir, 64'), Zouani B. – Coach: Said Hadj Mansour

25 April 2002 Round 23	WA Tlemcen	0–0	USM Blida	Tlemcen
15:00	Daoud (yellow card) 14'; Belgherri (yellow card) 55'; Yadel (yellow card) 63'	Report	Badache (yellow card) 44'; Aoun Seghir (yellow card) 48'	Stadium: Stade Akid Lotfi; Attendance: 5.000; Referee: Benouza, Belfekroun, Ghanem.
Note: Lineup for USM Blida - Samadi - Krebaza, Drali (De Oliveira, 68'), Amrouche R., Diss - Harkas, Badache (Aït Mokhtar, 56'), Galoul S., Aoun Seghir - Kherkhache, Zouani B. – Coach: Said Hadj Mansour

2 May 2002 Round 24	USM Blida	3–0	MC Alger	Blida
15:00	Kherkhache 8'; Diss 12'; Zouani B. 60'	Report		Stadium: Mustapha Tchaker Stadium; Attendance: 25.000; Referee: Lahmar, Sedrati, Talbi.
Note: Lineup for USM Blida - Samadi - Krebaza, Khazrouni, Diss, Galoul S. - Harkas, Aoun Segheir (Aït Mokhtar, 26'), Bakir (Djeddou, 78'), De Oliveira - Kherkhache (Badache, 31'), Zouani B. – Coach: Said Hadj Mansour

20 May 2002 Round 25	RC Kouba	1–1	USM Blida	Kouba
15:00	Zmit 2'; Liade (yellow card) 65'	Report	Harkas 81'; Harkas (yellow card) 85'; Badache (yellow card) 89'; Diss (yellow card) 90'	Stadium: Omar Benhaddad Stadium; Attendance: 7.000; Referee: Ouchène, Haouni, Miloud
Note: Lineup for USM Blida - Samadi - Krebaza, Drali, Amrouche, Diss - Harkas, Aït Mokhtar (Baïd, 74'), Galoul S. (cap.), De Olivera (Djeddou, 85') - Bakir (Khanfsi, 90'), Badache – Coach: Said Hadj Mansour

3 June 2002 Round 26	USM Blida	3–0	CA Bordj Bou Arreridj	Blida
15:00	Drali 8'; Zouani B. 60'; Aouameur 86' (o.g.); Djeddou (yellow card) 75'	Report		Stadium: Mustapha Tchaker Stadium; Attendance: 5.000; Referee: Benouza, Ouaddah, Aïssani.
Note: Lineup for USM Blida - Samadi - Krebaza (Khnifssi, 78'), Drali, Amrouche R., Diss - Akli (Aït Mokhtar, 47'), Bakir, Galoul S., De Oliveira - Badache (Djeddou, 70'), Zouani B. (cap). – Coach: Said Hadj Mansour

13 June 2002 Round 27	MO Constantine	2–1	USM Blida	Constantine
15:00	Redjal 37', 53'; Mehri (yellow card); Dergal (yellow card); Loué (yellow card)	Report	Bakir 14'; Drali (yellow card); Khezrouni (yellow card); Amrouche R (yellow card)	Stadium: Mohamed Hamlaoui Stadium; Attendance: 3.000; Referee: Khelifi, Khelifatniet, Oudjani.
Note: Lineup for USM Blida - Samadi - Drali, Khazrouni, Amrouche R., Diss - Harkas, Bakir (Kherkhache, '), Galoul S. (Aït Mokhtar, '), De Oliveira - Badache (Aoun Seghir, '), Zouani. – Coach: Said Hadj Mansour

17 June 2002 Round 28	USM Blida	2–0	ES Sétif	Blida
15:00	Galoul S. 10', Bakir 47'; De Oliveîra (yellow card) 13'; Diss (yellow card) 69'; Galoul S. (yellow card) 75'; Drali (yellow card) 87'	Report	Guenifi N. (yellow card) 66'	Stadium: Mustapha Tchaker Stadium; Attendance: 5.000; Referee: Djaballah, MM. Oukil, Kaïd.
Note: Lineup for USM Blida - Samadi - Krebaza, Drali, Amrouche R., Diss (Aoun Seghir, 70') - Harkas, Bakir (Kherkhache, 77'), Galoul S., De Oliveira - Badache (Aït Mokhtar, 80'), Zouani B. – Coach: Said Hadj Mansour

24 June 2002 Round 29	USM Annaba	1–0	USM Blida	Annaba
15:00	Zouaghi 47'	Report	Baïd (yellow card) 22'	Stadium: 19 May 1956 Stadium; Attendance: 3.000; Referee: Amari, Chaoudi, Djahnine.
Note: Lineup for USM Blida - Messaï - Khenfsi, Messaoudi, Aoun Seghir, Khazrouni - Aït Mokhtar, Akli (Gherzou, 72'), Tababouchet (Habachi, 58'), Djeddou - Kherkhache, Baïd – Coach: Said Hadj Mansour

1 July 2002 Round 30	USM Blida	1–3	ASM Oran	Blida
15:00	Amrouche 63'	Report	Khettab 13'; Ferradji (yellow card) 32'; Merrane 34'; Amour 87'	Stadium: Mustapha Tchaker Stadium; Referee: Amalou, Ben Ali, Zinet
Note: Lineup for USM Blida - Samadi (Messai 32'), Krebaza, Drali, Amrouche, Diss, Harkas, Badache (Ait Mokhtar 54'), Aoun Seghir, Kherkhache, De Oliveira, Zouani (Kebbachi 74') – Coach: Said Hadj Mansour

== Algerian Cup ==
14 March 2002 Round of 64	RC Kouba	0–0 (a.e.t.) (3–4 p)	USM Blida	Kouba (Algiers)
15:00	Liadé (yellow card) 97'; Slatni (yellow card) 80'	Report		Stadium: Omar Benhaddad Stadium; Attendance: 10.000; Referee: Benchenaâ (Athmania, Oudjani)
Note: Lineup for USM Blida - Samadi - Khazrouni, Amrouche, Diss, Harkas, Galoul, Aoun Sghir (Krebaza, 102'), Kherkhache (Aït Mokhtar, 69'), De Oliveira (Bakir, 94'), Badache, Zouani – Coach: Hadj Mansour

28 March 2002 Round of 32	CR Beni Thour	1–2 (a.e.t.)	USM Blida	Ouargla
15:00	Berka (yellow card) 7'; Boudaoui 55'	Report	Kherkhache 25'; Harkas 105'	Stadium: Olympic Ouargla Stadium; Attendance: 10.000; Referee: Ouchène, Zaid, Ouifi
Note: Lineup for USM Blida - Samadi, Krebaza, Khazrouni, Amrouche, Diss, Harkas, Badache (Djeddou 47'), Aoun Seghir (Aït Mokhtar, Kherkhache, De Oliveira, Galoul – Coach: Hadj Mansour

10 May 2002 Round of 16	USM Blida	2–0	HB Chelghoum Laïd	Blida
15:00	Baïd 82'; Aït Mokhtar 90+1'; (yellow card) 30' Diss	Report	Ounouri (yellow card) 30'; Azioun (yellow card) 59'	Stadium: Mustapha Tchaker Stadium; Attendance: 10.000; Referee: Hirèche (Belbcir, Lahneche)
Note: Lineup for USM Blida - Samadi - Krebaza, Khazrouni, Diss, Amrouche, Harkas, Bakir (Aït Mokhtar, 57'), Galoul, De Oliveira, Badache, Zouani (Baïd, 81') – Coach: Hadj Mansour

24 May 2002 Quarter-finals	USM Blida	2–0	MC Alger	Blida
15:00	Diss 6'; Zouani 90+4'; Galoul (yellow card) 41'; Harkas (yellow card) 79'	Report	(yellow card) 10' Bouacida; (yellow card) 13' Faisca; (yellow card) 41' Ouahid; (yellow card) 67' Slatni	Stadium: Mustapha Tchaker Stadium; Attendance: 30.000; Referee: Benchenaa (Belbcir et Danni)
Note: Lineup for USM Blida - Samadi - Krebaza, Drali, Amrouche, Diss - Aoun Segheir (Bakir, 46'), Harkas, Galoul, De Oliveira (Aït Mokhtar, 82')- Badache, Zouani – Coach: Hadj Mansour

10 June 2002 Semi-finals	MC Oran	1–0* (89')	USM Blida	Oran
15:00	Daoud B. 16' (yellow card) 29'	Report	(yellow card) 36' Krebaza	Stadium: Ahmed Zabana Stadium; Attendance: 35.000; Referee: Lahmar (Djezzar-Talbi)
Note: Lineup for USM Blida - Samadi - Krebaza, Drali, Diss, Amrouche, Harkas, Bakir (Kherkhache 69'), Galoul, De Oliveira (Aït Mokhtar, 45') - Badache, Zouani – Coach: Hadj Mansour

27 June 2002 Semi-finals	MC Oran	3–1	USM Blida	Oran
15:00	Haddou 39'; Daoud B. 52', 60'	Report	Galoul (red card) 20'; Badache 36'; Diss (yellow card) 60'	Stadium: Ahmed Zabana Stadium; Attendance: 0 Referee: Mouallef
Note: Lineup for USM Blida - Samadi, Khazrouni (Krebazza 63'), Drali, Amrouche, Diss, Harkas, Bakir (Kebbachi 62'), Galoul, Badache (Kherkhache 75'), Aoun Seghir, Zouani– Coach: Hadj Mansour

== Squad information ==
=== Playing statistics ===
No.	Pos	Nat	Player	Total		Ligue 1		Algerian Cup	
No.	Pos	Nat	Player	Apps	Goals	Apps	Goals	Apps	Goals
Goalkeepers
1	GK	(Algeria) ALG	Salah Samadi	30	0	25	0	5	0
	GK	(Algeria) ALG	Messai	5	0	5	0	0	0
Defenders
4	DF	(Algeria) ALG	Samir Galoul	31	1	26	1	5	0
5	DF	(Algeria) ALG	Smaïl Diss	30	4	25	3	5	1
2	DF	(Algeria) ALG	Abdennour Krebazza	26	0	21	0	5	0
	DF	(Algeria) ALG	Salim Drali	24	1	22	1	2	0
	MF	(Algeria) ALG	Rezki Amrouche	17	1	12	1	5	0
	DF	(Algeria) ALG	Sid Ahmed Belouahem	16	0	16	0	0	0
3	MF	(Algeria) ALG	Mohamed Khazrouni	18	0	14	0	4	0
	MF	(Algeria) ALG	Sid Ali Khenifsi	5	0	4	0	1	0
	DF	(Algeria) ALG	Reda Benhadj	4	0	4	0	0	0
	MF	(Algeria) ALG	Ahmed Amrouche	1	0	1	0	0	0
Midfielders
6	MF	(Algeria) ALG	Bilal Harkas	32	1	27	0	5	1
	MF	(Algeria) ALG	Hakim Aït Mokhtar	29	4	25	3	4	1
10	MF	(Brazil) BRA	de Oliveira	29	1	24	1	5	0
8	MF	(Algeria) ALG	Mohamed Aoun Seghir	27	0	23	0	4	0
	MF	(Algeria) ALG	Mohamed Bakir	24	3	20	3	4	0
	MF	(Algeria) ALG	Mahfoud Djeddou	12	0	11	0	1	0
	MF	(Algeria) ALG	Bilal Baïd	8	2	7	1	1	1
	MF	(Brazil) BRA	Domingos	2	0	2	0	0	0
	MF	(Brazil) BRA	Da Silva	1	0	1	0	0	0
	MF	(Algeria) ALG	Messaoudi	1	0	1	0	0	0
	MF	(Algeria) ALG	Gherzou	1	0	1	0	0	0
	MF	(Algeria) ALG	Tababouchet	1	0	1	0	0	0
Forwards
	FW	(Algeria) ALG	Mohamed Badache	32	4	27	3	5	1
11	FW	(Algeria) ALG	Billal Zouani	31	7	27	6	4	1
9	FW	(Algeria) ALG	Kamel Kherkhache	26	14	23	13	3	1
	DF	(Algeria) ALG	Amar Galoul	9	0	8	0	1	0
	DF	(Algeria) ALG	Kebbachi	2	0	1	0	1	0
Players transferred out during the season

Last updated: 1 July 2002
Source: Competitions

=== Goalscorers ===
Includes all competitive matches. The list is sorted alphabetically by surname when total goals are equal.

No.	Nat.	Player	Pos.	L 1	AC	TOTAL
-	(Algeria)	Kamel Kherkhache	FW	13	1	14
-	(Algeria)	Billal Zouani	FW	6	1	7
-	(Algeria)	Mohamed Badache	FW	3	2	5
-	(Algeria)	Smail Diss	DF	3	1	4
-	(Algeria)	Hakim Aït Mokhtar	MF	3	1	4
-	(Algeria)	Mohamed Bakir	DF	3	0	3
-	(Algeria)	Billel Harkas	MF	1	0	1
-	(Algeria)	Salim Drali	DF	1	0	1
-	(Algeria)	Rezki Amrouche	DF	1	0	1
-	(Algeria)	Samir Galoul	DF	1	0	1
-	(Brazil)	de Oliveira	MF	1	0	1
-	(Algeria)	Bilal Baïd	MF	0	1	1
Own Goals				1	0	1
Totals				37	7	44

=== Assists ===
No.	Nat.	Player	Pos.	L 1	AC	TOTAL
-	(Brazil)	de Oliveira	MF	13	2	15
-	(Algeria)	Billal Zouani	FW	4	0	4
-	(Algeria)	Hakim Aït Mokhtar	MF	3	0	3
-	(Algeria)	Abdennour Krebaza	DF	2	1	3
-	(Algeria)	Sid Ahmed Belouahem	DF	2	0	2
-	(Algeria)	Kamel Kherkhache	FW	2	0	2
-	(Algeria)	Bakir	DF	2	0	2
-	(Algeria)	Samir Galoul	DF	1	0	1
-	(Algeria)	Mohamed Badache	FW	1	0	1

=== Clean sheets ===
Includes all competitive matches.

No.	Nat	Name	L 1	AC	TOTAL
	(Algeria)	Salah Samadi	8	3	11
	(Algeria)	Messaï	3	0	3

=== Hat-tricks ===
Player	Against	Result	Date	Competition	Ref
(Algeria) Kamel Kherkhache^{4}	CA Bordj Bou Arreridj	2–4 (A)	29 November 2001	Super Division	
(Algeria) Kamel Kherkhache	USM Annaba	5–1 (H)	7 January 2002	Super Division	

(H) – Home; (A) – Away

== Transfers ==
=== In ===
Date	Pos	Player	To club	Transfer fee	Source
August 2001	DF	(Algeria) Smaïl Diss	ES Mostaganem		
August 2001	MF	(Algeria) Mahfoud Djeddou			
August 2001	FW	(Algeria) Amar Galoul			
August 2001	DF	(Algeria) Sid Ahmed Belouahem	NA Hussein Dey		
December 2001	DF	(Algeria) Rezki Amrouche	(France) Stade Brest	Free	

=== Out ===
Date	Pos	Player	To club	Transfer fee	Source
2001	GK	(Algeria) Farid Belmellat	JSM Béjaïa		
2001		(Algeria) Briki	?		
2001		(Algeria) Harnane	?		
2001		(Algeria) Zafour	?		
2001		(Algeria) Djender	?		
December 2001		(Algeria) Ahmed Amrouche	?		
December 2001		(Algeria) Amar Galoul	?		
