= Ilta-Sanomat Player of the Year Award =

Ilta-Sanomat Player of the Year Award (Finnish: IS-tähtikisa) is an annual award given by the Finnish evening paper Ilta-Sanomat for the best individual players of Finnish top leagues in ice hockey (SM-liiga), basketball (Korisliiga), volleyball (Mestaruusliiga) and floorball (Salibandyliiga). Due to sponsorship reasons the award has not been given in football Veikkausliiga since 2009.

The award is based on post-match ratings made in every single match by a sport journalist and two local sportspersons or celebrities. Best player of the match is awarded with three points ("stars"), second best with two and third best with one. The player collecting most "stars" during the season wins the award.

== Winners ==
=== Football ===
Season	Player	Club
1983	(Finland) Mika Lipponen	TPS Turku
1984	(Finland) Heikki Suhonen	TPS Turku
1985	(Finland) Jukka Ikäläinen	KePS Kemi
1986	(Finland) Ismo Lius	FC Kuusysi
1987	(Finland) Jarmo Alatensiö	PPT Pori
1988	(Finland) Ismo Lius	FC Kuusysi
1989	(Finland) Jari Litmanen	Reipas Lahti
1990	(Finland) Jari Litmanen	Reipas Lahti
1991	(Finland) Jari Litmanen	HJK Helsinki
1992	(Russia) Vasili Karatayev	RoPS Rovaniemi
1993	(Brazil) Piracaia	FC Jazz
1994	(Russia) Alexei Eremenko Sr.	FF Jaro
1995	(Russia) Valeri Popovitch	FC Haka
1996	(Brazil) Luiz Antônio	FC Jazz
1997	(Russia) Alexei Eremenko Sr.	FF Jaro
1998	(Zambia) Zeddy Saileti	RoPS Rovaniemi
1999	(Russia) Valeri Popovitch	FC Haka
2000	(Finland) Shefki Kuqi	FC Jokerit
2001	(Finland) Antti Pohja	Tampere United
2002	(Finland) Jari Niemi	Tampere United
2003	(Russia) Valeri Popovitch	FC Haka
2004	(Finland) Fredrik Svanbäck	FF Jaro
2005	(Russia) Valeri Popovitch	FC Haka
2006	(Algeria) Farid Ghazi	HJK Helsinki
2007	(Russia) Valeri Popovitch	FC Haka
2008	(Finland) Mikko Hyyrynen	FF Jaro

== See also ==
- Finnish Footballer of the Year
