= Kamel Kherkhache =

Algerian footballer

Personal information
- Full name: Kamel Kherkhache
- Date of birth: March 21, 1973 (age 53)
- Place of birth: Algeria
- Position: Striker

Team information
- Current team: AB Mérouana

Senior career*
Years	Team	Apps	(Gls)
1993–1999	USM Aïn Beïda		
1999–2002	USM Blida	74	(31)
2002–2004	MO Constantine		
2004–2006	USM Aïn Beïda		
2008–2013	AB Mérouana		

International career
2000–2003	Algeria	10	(2)
- * Club domestic league appearances and goals

Kamel Kherkhache born December 2, 1976, in Mostaganem is an Algerian football player currently playing for AB Mérouana.

== Career statistics ==
=== Club ===
Club	Season	League			Cup		Total	
Club	Season	Division	Apps	Goals	Apps	Goals	Apps	Goals
USM Blida	1999–00	Division 1	19	6	4	0	23	6
USM Blida	2000–01	Division 1	26	12	2	1	27	13
USM Blida	2001–02	Division 1	22	13	3	1	23	14
Total			67	31	8	2	76	33
Career total			0	0	0	0	0	0

=== International ===
Appearances and goals by national team and year
National team	Year	Apps	Goals
Algeria	2000	3	1
Algeria	2001	4	1
Algeria	2002	3	0
Total		10	2

Scores and results list Algeria's goal tally first, score column indicates score after each Kherkhache goal.

List of international goals scored by Kamel Kherkhache
No.	Date	Venue	Opponent	Score	Result	Competition	Ref.
1	8 December 2000	19 May 1956 Stadium, Annaba, Algeria	Romania	2–3	2–3	Friendly	
2	1 June 2001	19 May 1956 Stadium, Annaba, Algeria	Angola	3–2	3–2	2002 African Cup of Nations qualification	
