= Farid Ghazi =

Algerian footballer (born 1974)

Personal information
- Full name: Farid Ghazi
- Date of birth: 16 March 1974 (age 52)
- Place of birth: Guelma, Algeria
- Height: 1.85 m (6 ft 1 in)
- Position: Forward

Senior career*
Years	Team	Apps	(Gls)
1994–1995	ES Guelma		
1995–1996	US Chaouia		
1996–1997	ES Guelma		
1997–1999	JS Kabylie	24	(19)
1999–2001	Troyes	39	(8)
2001–2002	Baniyas SC	7	(4)
2002–2003	Troyes	3	(0)
2003	JS Kabylie	13	(6)
2004–2005	Olympique Béja	11	(3)
2005–2005	ES Guelma		
2006–2007	HJK Helsinki	29	(14)
2007–2009	JSM Béjaïa	40	(10)

International career
1999–2002	Algeria	22	(5)
- * Club domestic league appearances and goals

Farid Ghazi (born 16 March 1974) is an Algerian former professional footballer who played as a forward. He made 22 appearances for the Algeria national team scoring five goals.

== Honours ==
Troyes

- UEFA Intertoto Cup: 2001

HJK Helsinki

- Finnish Cup: 2006

JSM Béjaïa

- Algerian Cup: 2008

Individual

- Topscorer of the Algerian League with JS Kabylie in 1998–99 season with 19 goals
- Ilta-Sanomat Player of the Year Award 2006
