= 1999–2000 USM Blida season =

USM Blida
1999–2000 season
- Chairman: Mohamed Zaïm
- Head coach: Nasreddine Akli (until Mars 2000); Kamel Mouassa (from Mars 2000)
- Stadium: Brakni Brothers Stadium
- National 1: 7th
- Algerian Cup: Round of 32
- Top goalscorer: League: Billal Zouani (9 goals); All: Billal Zouani (8 goals)
Home colours	Away colours

In the 1999–2000 season, USM Blida is competing in the National 1 for the 15th season, as well as the Algerian Cup. They will be competing in Ligue 1, and the Algerian Cup.

== Competitions ==
=== Overview ===
Competition	Record								Started round	Final position / round	First match	Last match
Competition	G	W	D	L	GF	GA	GD	Win %	Started round	Final position / round	First match	Last match
National 1	22	6	8	8	26	29	−3	27.27	—N/a	4th	14 October 1999	29 June 2000
Algerian Cup	5	1	3	1	5	5	+0	20.00	Round of 64	Round of 8	3 March 2000	8 June 2000
League Cup	9	2	4	3	10	14	−4	22.22	Group stage	Group stage	23 December 1999	3 February 2000
Total	36	9	15	12	41	48	−7	25.00				

Updated to match played April 2020
Source: Competitions

=== National ===
==== League table ====
Pos	Team	Pld	W	D	L	GF	GA	GD	Pts	Qualification
5	ES Sétif	22	8	6	8	31	34	−3	30	
6	JS Kabylie	22	7	8	7	21	24	−3	29	2001 CAF Cup
7	USM Blida	22	6	8	8	26	29	−3	26	
8	CA Batna	22	7	5	10	23	33	−10	26	
9	USM Annaba	22	6	6	10	22	36	−14	24	

Source: rsssf
Rules for classification: 1) points; 2) head to head ; 3)goal difference; 4) number of goals scored.

=== Results summary ===
Overall								Home						Away					
Pld	W	D	L	GF	GA	GD	Pts	W	D	L	GF	GA	GD	W	D	L	GF	GA	GD
22	6	8	8	26	29	−3	26	6	4	1	17	11	+6	0	4	7	9	18	−9

Last updated: April 2020.
Source: Competitive matches

=== Results by round ===
Round	1	2	3	4	5	6	7	8	9	10	11	12	13	14	15	16	17	18	19	20	21	22
Ground	H	A	H	A	H	A	H	A	H	A	H	A	H	A	H	A	H	A	H	A	H	A
Result	W	L	L	L	W	L	D	D	D	L	W	L	W	L	W	L	D	D	D	D	W	D
Position	4	7	8	9	7	7	9	9	9	11	8	9	8	10	9	10	8	8	9	8	7	7

Updated to match(es) played on July 1999. Source: Competitive matches
A = Away; H = Home; W = Win; D = Draw; L = Loss

=== Matches ===
Win Draw Loss

14 October 1999 Round 1	USM Blida	1–0	CA Batna	Blida
14:00	Bilal Harkes 23'	Report		Stadium: Brakni Brothers Stadium
Note: Lineup for USM Blida – – Coach: Nasreddine Akli

21 October 1999 Round 2	USM Annaba	2–1	USM Blida	Annaba
14:00	Abaci 50'; Fnidés 60'	Report	Aït Tahar 83'	Stadium: May 19, 1956 Stadium
Note: Lineup for USM Blida – – Coach: Nasreddine Akli

28 October 1999 Round 3	USM Blida	0–1	MO Constantine	Blida
14:00	Ahmed Amrouche (yellow card); Zouani (yellow card)	Report	Benrabah 40' (pen.)	Stadium: Brakni Brothers Stadium; Referee: Djamel Haimoudi
Note: Lineup for USM Blida – Benrabah, Krebaza, Mammeri (Dagno), Ahmed Amrouche, Galoul, Tizarouine, Derriche, Aït Tahar (Cap), Harkas, Hamid Aït Belkacem (Kherkhache), Zouani – Coach: Nasreddine Akli, Mehdi Cerbah

1 November 1999 Round 4	CR Belouizdad	2–0	USM Blida	Algiers
14:00	Ali Moussa 6'; Boutaleb 40'	Report		Stadium: August 20, 1955 Stadium (Algiers)
Note: Lineup for USM Blida – – Coach: Nasreddine Akli

4 November 1999 Round 5	USM Blida	2–0	JS Kabylie	Blida
14:00	Zouani 10'; Kherkhache 63'	Report		Stadium: Brakni Brothers Stadium
Note: Lineup for USM Blida – – Coach: Nasreddine Akli

18 November 1999 Round 6	MC Alger	2–1	USM Blida	Algiers
14:00	Dob 41', 80'; Khenouf (yellow card)	Report	Djeddou 3'; Benrabah (yellow card); Djeddou (yellow card); Kherkhache (yellow card)	Stadium: Stade du 5 Juillet; Referee: Benchenâa, Chadli, Bourayou
Note: Lineup for USM Blida – Benrabah, Krebaza, Mammeri, Ahmed Amrouche, Fatahine Lyès, Derriche (Drali), Dagno, Harkas, Zouani, Djeddou (Kherkhache), Aït Tahar – Coach: Nasreddine Akli

25 November 1999 Round 7	USM Blida	3–3	ES Sétif	Blida
14:00	Aït Tahar 50' (pen.); Zouani 57', 75'	Report	Bourahli 17'; Kamli 74'; Tizarouine 79' (o.g.)	Stadium: Brakni Brothers Stadium
Note: Lineup for USM Blida – – Coach: Nasreddine Akli

2 December 1999 Round 8	WA Tlemcen	2–2	USM Blida	Tlemcen
14:00	Hachemi 66' (pen.); Yadel 73'; Ali Dahleb (red card) 36'; Kherris (yellow card); Loukili (yellow card)	Report	Zouani 45'; Sloukia 78'; Mammeri (yellow card); Fatahine (yellow card); Amrouch (yellow card)	Stadium: Stade Akid Lotfi; Referee: Benaïssi, Belebcir, Maouni
Note: Lineup for USM Blida – Haniched, Krebaza, Mammeri, Tizarouine, Fatahine, Ahmed Amrouche, Harkas, Derriche (Sloukia), Kherkhache, Aït Tahar, Zouani – Coach: Nasreddine Akli

6 December 1999 Round 9	USM Blida	1–1	MC Oran	Blida
14:00	Kherkhache 7'	Report	Belatoui	Stadium: Brakni Brothers Stadium
Note: Lineup for USM Blida – – Coach:

9 December 1999 Round 10	USM Alger	2–1	USM Blida	Algiers
14:00	Meftah 50' (pen.); Rahim 80'; Yacef (yellow card)	Report	Zouani 84'; Ahmed Amrouche (yellow card); Galoul (yellow card)	Stadium: Omar Hamadi Stadium
Note: Lineup for USM Blida – Haniched, Krebaza, Mammeri, Ahmed Amrouche (Tizarouine 46e), Galoul, Derriche (Mehdaoui 77e), Harkas, Sloukia, Kherkhache, Djeddou (Aït Belkacem 46e), Zouani B – Coach: Nasreddine Akli

16 December 1999 Round 11	USM Blida	1–0	JSM Béjaïa	Blida
14:00	Sloukia 25'	Report		Stadium: Brakni Brothers Stadium
Note: Lineup for USM Blida – – Coach:

9 March 2000 Round 12	CA Batna	1–0	USM Blida	Batna
14:00	Benhassene 51'			Stadium: Mustapha Seffouhi Stadium
Note: Lineup for USM Blida – – Coach: Kamel Mouassa

23 March 2000 Round 13	USM Blida	1–0	USM Annaba	Blida
14:00	Kherkhache 71'; Krebaza (yellow card); Tizarouine (yellow card); Fatahine (yellow card)	Report	Khalfa (red card) 75'; Bouacida (yellow card); Ouichaoui F. (yellow card); Djebali (yellow card); Chaïb (yellow card)	Stadium: Brakni Brothers Stadium; Referee: Lezzouni, Zerguenif, Ghanem
Note: Lineup for USM Blida – Haniched, Krebaza, Drali, Ahmed Amrouche, Galoul, Tizarouine (Fatahine), Aït Tahar, Harkas, Kherkhache, Hamid Aït Belkacem, Zouani – Coach: Kamel Mouassa

27 March 2000 Round 14	MO Constantine	1–0	USM Blida	Constantine
14:00	Mechehoud 64'			Stadium: Mohamed Hamlaoui Stadium
Note: Lineup for USM Blida – – Coach: Kamel Mouassa

24 April 2000 Round	USM Blida	2–1	CR Belouizdad	Blida
14:00	Aït Tahar 48'; Kherkhache 72'	Report	Talis 50'	Stadium: Brakni Brothers Stadium
Note: Lineup for USM Blida – Haniched, Krebaza, Drali, Ahmed Amrouche, Galoul, Aoun Seghir, (Tizarouine 54'), Aït Tahar, Harkas, Kherkhache, (Zane 85'), Aït Belkacem, Zouani – Coach: Kamel Mouassa

27 April 2000 Round 16	JS Kabylie	2–0	USM Blida	Tizi Ouzou
14:00	Gasmi 18'; Benhamlat 72'	Report		Stadium: November 1, 1954 Stadium; Referee: Mouelef, Belbordj, Aribi
Note: Lineup for USM Blida – Haniched, Aoun Seghir, Zane, Ahmed Amrouche, Galoul, Tizarouine, Aït Tahar, Drali, Djeddou, Aït Belkacem, Zouani – Coach: Kamel Mouassa

11 May 2000 Round 17	USM Blida	3–3	MC Alger	Blida
14:00	Zouani 21', 39'; Ahmed Amrouche 89'	Report	Boutine 5', 72'; Kaci-Saïd 27'	Stadium: Brakni Brothers Stadium; Attendance: 7.000; Referee: Abdi, Lellouchi, Zinet
Note: Lineup for USM Blida – Benrabah, Krebaza (Baid 75e), Drali, Ahmed Amrouche, Galoul, Tizarouine, Djeddou, Mehdaoui (Sloukia 65e), Kherkhache, Aït Belkacem, Zouani – Coach: Kamel Mouassa

18 May 2000 Round 18	ES Sétif	1–1	USM Blida	Sétif
14:00	Bourahli 14'	Report	Zouani 70'	Stadium: Stade 8 Mai 1945; Referee: Lazouni, Zerguenif, Ghanem
Note: Lineup for USM Blida – Haniched (Benrabah), Krebaza, Aoun Seghir (Aït Tahar), Tizarouine, Galoul, Drali, Djeddou, Mehdaoui, Kherkhache, Aït Belkacem, Zouani – Coach: Kamel Mouassa

29 May 2000 Round 19	USM Blida	1–1	WA Tlemcen	Blida
14:00	Hakim Zane	Report		Stadium: Brakni Brothers Stadium
Note: Lineup for USM Blida – – Coach: Kamel Mouassa

1 June 2000 Round 20	MC Oran	1–1	USM Blida	Oran
14:00	Gaïd 83'	Report	Tababouchet 42'	Stadium: Ahmed Zabana Stadium; Referee: Ouchène, Debiche, Boukadjar
Note: Lineup for USM Blida – Benrabah, Aoun Seghir, Tizarouine, Ahmed Amrouche, Tababouchet, Harkas, Mehdaoui, (Djeddou 90e), Baid, Aït Tahar, Sloukia. – Coach: Kamel Mouassa

12 June 2000 Round 21	USM Blida	2–1	USM Alger	Blida
14:00	Djeddou 30'; Kherkhache 64'	Report	Manga 59'	Stadium: Brakni Brothers Stadium; Referee: Boubakeur, Menana, Lamini
Note: Lineup for USM Blida – Haniched, Krebaza, Zane, Tizarouine, Galoul, Harkas, Aït Tahar, Aït Belkacem, Kherkhache, Djeddou, Zouani – Coach: Kamel Mouassa

29 June 2000 Round 22	JSM Béjaïa	2–2	USM Blida	Béjaïa
14:00		Report	Hamid Aït Belkacem; Kherkhache	Stadium: Maghrebi Unity Stadium
Note: Lineup for USM Blida – – Coach: Kamel Mouassa

== Algerian Cup ==
3 March 2000 Round of 64	USM Blida	1–0	MSP Batna	Sour El-Ghozlane
15:00	Zane			Stadium: Stade communal de Sour El-Ghozlane; Referee: Lazoun, Zerguenif, Ghanem
Note: Lineup for USM Blida – Coach: Kamel Mouassa

1 May 2000 Round of 32	USM Blida	1–1 (a.e.t.) (3–0 p)	USM Annaba	Béjaïa
15:00	Galoul 75'		Ouichaoui 5'	Stadium: Maghrebi Unity Stadium
Note: Lineup for USM Blida – Coach: Kamel Mouassa

16 May 2000 Round of 16	USM Alger	1–1 (a.e.t.) (2–4 p)	USM Blida	Algiers
15:00	Meftah 44'		Zouani 27'	Stadium: Stade du 5 Juillet
Note: Lineup for USM Blida – Haniched (Benrabah), Krebaza, Galoul, Drali,... Mehdaoui, Djeddou, Zouani, Kherkhache – Coach: Kamel Mouassa

5 June 2000 Quarter-final first leg	USM Blida	1–2	WA Tlemcen	Blida
15:00	Galoul 79' (f.k); Drali (yellow card) 75' (yellow-red card) 84'	Report	Boudjakdji 74' (yellow card); Dahleb 89'	Stadium: Brakni Brothers Stadium; Attendance: 10.000; Referee: Moualleuf, Belbordj, Laribi.
Note: Lineup for USM Blida – Hanniched - Krebaza - Drali - Amrouche - Galoul - Tizarouine - Aït Tahar (Baïd 76’) - Harkas (Sloukia 76’) - Kherkhache - Aït Belkacem (Djeddou 64’) - Zouani Billal – Coach: Kamel Mouassa and Aït Mouloud

8 June 2000 Quarter-final Second leg	WA Tlemcen	1–1 (34')	USM Blida	Tlemcen
15:00	Amrouche (yellow card) 17' (yellow-red card) 34'; Galoul 30' (f.k)	Report	Daoud 12'; Boudjakdji (yellow card) 17'; Dahleb (yellow card) 29'	Stadium: Stade Akid Lotfi; Attendance: 16.000; Referee: Benaïssa, Belbecir, Maouni.
Note: The match stopped at the 34th minute; Lineup for USM Blida – Haniched, Krebaza, Tizarouine, Galoul, Amrouche, Harkas, Mehdaoui, Kherkhache, Aït Belkacem, Zane, Aït Tahar – Coach: Kamel Mouassa and Aït Mouloud

== Algerian League Cup ==
=== Group stage ===
Team	Pld	W	D	L	GF	GA	GD	Pts
MC Alger	9	3	4	2	11	10	+1	13
USM Alger	8	3	3	2	11	9	+2	12
USM Blida	9	2	4	3	10	14	−4	10
JS Kabylie	9	1	5	3	6	8	−2	8
NA Hussein Dey	9	2	0	7	8	14	−6	6

23 December 1999 1	USM Alger	2–2	USM Blida	Algiers
16:00	Ghazi 38' (yellow card) 38'; Yacef 62'	Report	Mehdaoui 23'; Zouani 56'	Stadium: Stade Omar Hammadi; Attendance: 8.000; Referee: Abdi, Zine, Guemaz
Note: Lineup for USM Alger - Haniched, Galoul (Harkas (substituted off) (substituted in) 60'), Mameri, Tizarouine, Fatahine, Derriche, Mehdaoui, Sloukia, Aït Tahar (Kherkhache (substituted off) (substituted in) 59'), Aït Belkacecm (Djeddou (substituted off) (substituted in) 86'), Zouani – Coach: Nasreddine Akli

30 December 1999 2	JS Kabylie	1–1	USM Blida	Blida
	Meftah
Note: Lineup for USM Blida – – Coach:

3 January 2000 3	MC Alger	2–3	USM Blida	Algiers
				Stadium: Stade 5 juillet 1962; Referee: Bounaâdja, Akrour, Afroun
Note: Lineup for USM Blida – – Coach:

13 January 2000 4	NA Hussein Dey	2–0	USM Blida	Hussein Dey
Note: Lineup for USM Blida – – Coach:

20 January 200 5	USM Blida	0–0	USM El Harrach	Blida
Note: Lineup for USM Blida – – Coach:

24 January 2000 6	CR Belouizdad	3–0	USM Blida	Algiers
Note: Lineup for USM Blida – – Coach:

27 January 2000 7	USM Blida	1–2	JSM Béjaïa	Blida
Note: Lineup for USM Blida – – Coach:

31 January 2000 8	RC Kouba	2–2	USM Blida	Kouba
Note: Lineup for USM Blida – – Coach:

3 February 2000 9	USM Blida	1–0	JS Bordj Ménaïel	Blida
Note: Lineup for USM Blida – – Coach:

== Squad information ==
=== Playing statistics ===
Only 11 games from 22 in National appearances

No.	Pos	Nat	Player	Total		Ligue 1		Algerian Cup	
No.	Pos	Nat	Player	Apps	Goals	Apps	Goals	Apps	Goals
Goalkeepers
	GK	(Algeria) ALG	Mohamed Haniched	7	0	7	0		
	GK	(Algeria) ALG	Mahfoud Benrabah	5	0	5	0		
Defenders
	DF	(Algeria) ALG	Abdelouahab Tizarouine	10	0	10			
	DF	(Algeria) ALG	Abdennour Krebaza	9	0	9			
	DF	(Algeria) ALG	Ahmed Amrouche	9	0	9			
	DF	(Algeria) ALG	Samir Galloul	7	0	7			
	DF	(Algeria) ALG	Salim Drali	6	0	6			
	DF	(Algeria) ALG	Hacène Mammeri	4	0	4			
	MF	(Algeria) ALG	Abdeltif Derriche	4	0	4			
	DF	(Algeria) ALG	Lyès Fetahine	3	0	3			
	DF	(Algeria) ALG	Zane	3	0	3			
Midfielders
	MF	(Algeria) ALG	Billel Harkas	8	0	8			
	MF	(Algeria) ALG	Hamid Aït Belkacem	8	0	8			
	MF	(Algeria) ALG	Mahfoud Djeddou	6	0	6			
	DF	(Algeria) ALG	Mohamed Aoun Seghir	4	0	4			
	MF	(Algeria) ALG	Salah Eddine Mehdaoui	4	0	4			
	MF	(Burkina Faso) BFA	Moussa Dagno	2	0	2			
	MF	(Algeria) ALG	Tababouchet	1	0	1			
Forwards
	FW	(Algeria) ALG	Billal Zouani	10	0	10			
	FW	(Algeria) ALG	Kamel Kherkhache	9	0	9			
	FW	(Algeria) ALG	Mourad Aït Tahar	9	0	9			
	FW	(Algeria) ALG	Samir Sloukia	4	0	4			
	FW	(Algeria) ALG	Billal Baid	2	0	2			
Players transferred out during the season

Last updated: July 2000
Source: Competitions

=== Goalscorers ===
Includes all competitive matches. The list is sorted alphabetically by surname when total goals are equal.

No.	Nat.	Player	Pos.	L 1	AC	TOTAL
-	(Algeria)	Billal Zouani	FW	8	1	9
-	(Algeria)	Kamel Kherkhache	FW	6	0	6
-	(Algeria)	Mourad Aït Tahar	FW	3	0	3
-	(Algeria)	Samir Galoul	DF	0	3	3
-	(Algeria)	Samir Sloukia	FW	2	0	2
-	(Algeria)	Mahfoud Djeddou	MF	2	0	2
-	(Algeria)	Billel Harkas	MF	1	0	1
-	(Algeria)	Ahmed Amrouche	MF	1	0	1
-	(Algeria)	Tababouchet	MF	1	0	1
-	(Algeria)	Hakim Zane	DF	1	1	2
Own Goals				1	0	1
Totals				26	5	31

=== [Assists] ===
No.	Nat.	Player	Pos.	L 1	AC	TOTAL
-	(Algeria)		FW			

=== Clean sheets ===
Includes all competitive matches.

No.	Nat	Name	L 1	AC	TOTAL
	(Algeria)	Mohamed Haniched	4	1	5

== Transfers ==
=== In ===
Date	Pos	Player	From club	Transfer fee	Source
1999	FW	(Algeria) Kamel Kherkhache	USM Aïn Beïda		
1999	FW	(Algeria) Mourad Aït Tahar	JS Kabylie		
1999	DF	(Algeria) Lyès Fatahine	MC Alger	Free transfer	
1999	MF	(Algeria) Abdellatif Derriche	MC Alger	Free transfer	
1999	DF	(Algeria) Abdelouahab Tizarouine	US Chaouia		
1999	DF	(Algeria) Salim Drali	JS Bordj Ménaïel		
1999	MF	(Algeria) Mahfoud Djeddou			
1999	MF	(Algeria) Samir Sloukia	USM Alger		
1999	MF	(Algeria) Hamid Aït Belkacem	USM Alger		
1999	MF	(Algeria) Salah Eddine Mehdaoui	NCB El Affroun		
2000	DF	(Algeria) Hakim Zane			

=== Out ===
Date	Pos	Player	From club	Transfer fee	Source
1999	DF	(Algeria) Boughrab			
1999	MF	(Algeria) Mohamed Khazrouni	USM Alger	Free transfer	
1999	MF	(Algeria) Benamour			
1999	MF	(Algeria) Sahraoui			
1999	FW	(Algeria) Halim Belaiter	ES Guelma		
1999	FW	(Algeria) Youcef Lassakeur			
1999	FW	(Algeria) Fawzi Moussouni	JS Kabylie	Loan Return	
