= Valeri Popovitch =

Russian footballer (born 1970)

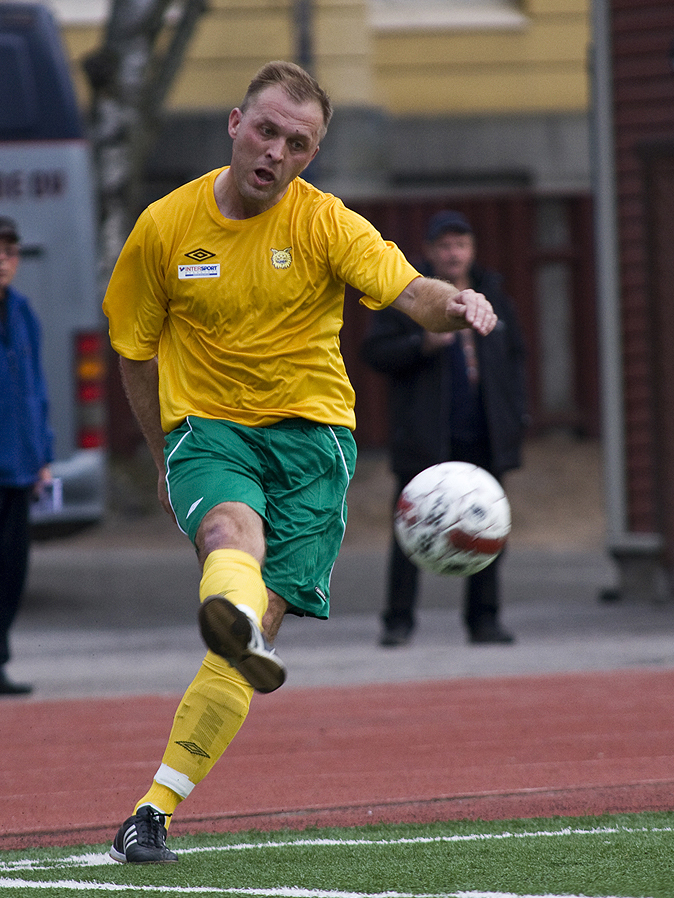
- Popovitch with Ilves in a charity match in 2010

Personal information
- Full name: Valeri Aleksandrovich Popovitch
- Date of birth: 18 May 1970 (age 56)
- Place of birth: Gorky, Soviet Union
- Height: 1.85 m (6 ft 1 in)
- Positions: Striker; attacking midfielder

Senior career*
| Years | Team | Apps | (Gls) |
| 1986 | Khimik Dzerzhinsk | 3 | (1) |
| 1987 | Lokomotiv Gorky | 3 | (0) |
| 1988–1989 | CSKA Moscow | 25 | (0) |
| 1990–1991 | Spartak Moscow | 10 | (0) |
| 1992–1993 | TPV | 48 | (26) |
| 1994 | Ilves | 12 | (3) |
| 1994–2008 | Haka | 323 | (170) |
| 1995–1996 | → Ikast (loan) | 6 | (3) |
| 1999–2000 | → Heerenveen (loan) | 18 | (6) |
| 2009 | HJK | 16 | (3) |
| 2010–2012 | Ilves | ? | (?) |
| Total | | 464 | (212) |

International career
- USSR U-17
- USSR U-19

Managerial career
- 2010–2012: Ilves (player-coach)
- 2012: Haka (youth coach)
- * Club domestic league appearances and goals

Valeri Aleksandrovich Popovitch (Russian: Валерий Александрович Попович; born 18 May 1970) is a Russian former football forward. Popovitch is the all-time scoring leader of FC Haka. After his contract ended with HJK in 2010, he joined Ilves Tampere playing in Kakkonen, as a player-coach, signing a two-year contract. Currently he is a youth coach at FC Haka. Popovitch also holds Finnish citizenship.

He has also capped several times for Soviet U-17 and U-19 National football teams. U-17 finished third in the 1986 UEFA European Under-17 Football Championship, and U-19 won the UEFA European Under-19 Football Championship in 1988. Popovitch played in both tournaments.

Popovitch played for FC CSKA Moscow in Soviet First League and FC Spartak Moscow in the Soviet Top League.

He has a fear of flying which often meant he was unable to appear in away matches in European competitions.

== Legacy ==
Popovitch holds a legendary status in Finland and especially in Valkeakoski, where he is regarded as one of the best players ever to play for FC Haka. FC Haka retired his number, 14. During his career, he made 395 appearances and scored 166 goals in Finnish top-tier, making him the top scorer in the Veikkausliiga history.

His son Anton Popovitch is also a professional footballer, currently playing for Ilves.
