= Said Hadj Mansour =

Mansour Al Haj Saeed
Personal information
- Full name: Mansour Al Haj Saeed
- Date of birth: 1 January 1948 (age 78)
- Place of birth: Palestine
- Position: Midfielder

Youth career
- 1970's: Al Wahda Club
- 1977–1978: Al-Ittihad Kalba SC

International career
Years	Team	Apps	(Gls)
–	Palestine		
–	Syria		

Managerial career
- 1992–1993: ES Sétif
- 1993–1994: US Chaouia
- 1998–1999: USM Alger
- 2001–2002: USM Blida
- 2003: JSM Béjaïa
- 2008: ASO Chlef
- 2009: MC Oran
- 2011: ES Sétif
- 2011: MC Oran
- 2016–2017: USM Blida
- 2018: USM Blida

Mansour Al Haj Saeed is a Palestinian football manager and former player. He is currently unattached, after last managing MC Oran in the Algerian Ligue Professionnelle 1.

== Managerial career ==
On October 2, 2011, Hadj Mansour was terminated from his role as head coach of MC Oran after leading the club to the bottom of the table and managing just 2 points from the club's first 4 games of the 2011–12 season.

== Honours ==
- Won the Algerian Ligue Professionnelle 1 with US Chaouia in 1994
