= Piracaia (footballer) =

Brazilian footballer

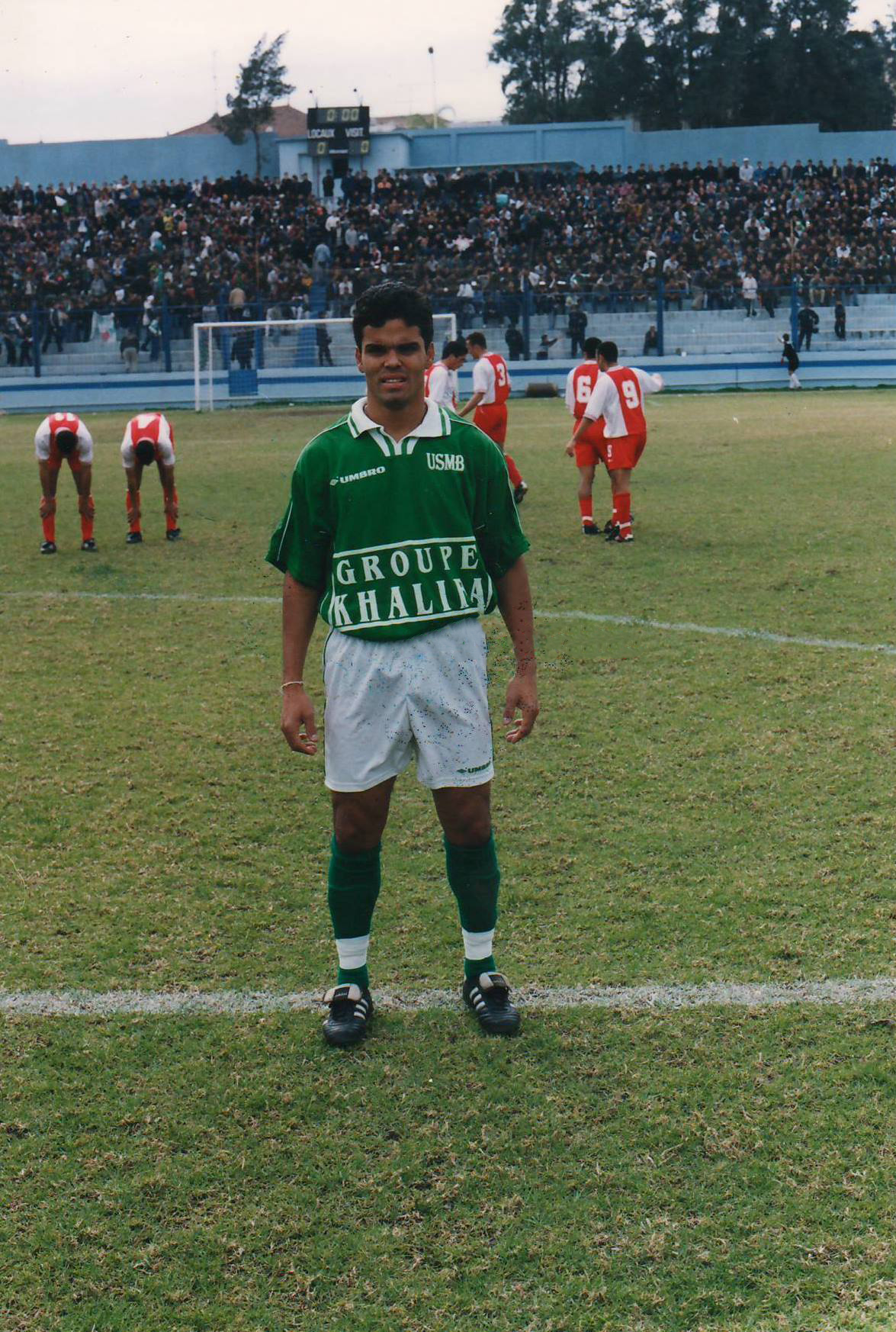
- Piracaia in Algerian club (USM Blida 2000)

Personal information
- Full name: Marcelo Gonçalves de Oliveira
- Date of birth: April 17, 1971 (age 55)
- Place of birth: São Paulo, Brazil
- Height: 1.71 m (5 ft 7 1/2 in)
- Position: Midfielder

Team information
- Current team: Musan Salama

Youth career
- 1985–1987: Piracaia FC

Senior career*
Years	Team	Apps	(Gls)
1988–1991	C.A. Bragantino	–	(–)
1992–1997	FC Jazz	145	(27)
1997	AIK	13	(1)
1998–2000	HJK	47	(4)
2000	→ Kotkan TP	13	(0)
2000–2002	USM Blida	50	(4)
2001	→ Atlantis	11	(1)
2002	FC Hämeenlinna	1	(0)
2003–2004	FC Jazz	50	(7)
2004–2005	US Monastir	–	(–)
2005–2007	FF Jaro	57	(1)
2008–2010	FC PoPa	54	(5)
2010–2014	MuSa	95	(12)
- * Club domestic league appearances and goals

Marcelo Gonçalves de Oliveira (born April 17, 1971 in São Paulo), known as Piracaia, is a Brazilian football player. He currently plays and works as an assistant coach for the Finnish second-tier club Musan Salama.

Piracaia has played 17 seasons and 324 matches in Finnish Veikkausliiga. In the six games of the 1998–99 UEFA Champions League group stage he was in the opening line-up of HJK Helsinki. Piracaia has also played in the top divisions of Sweden, Algeria and Tunisia.

== Honours ==
Club:

- Finnish championship: 1993, 1996
- Swedish championship: 1998
- Finnish Cup winner: 1998

Personal:

- Ilta-Sanomat Player of the Year Award: 1993

== statistics ==
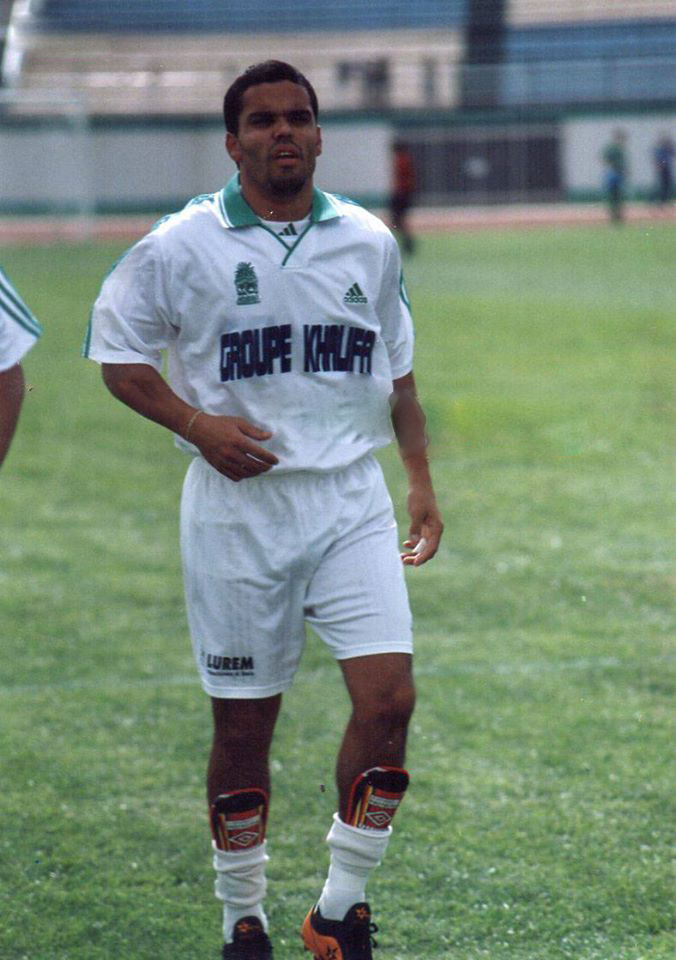
de Oliveira (USM Blida)

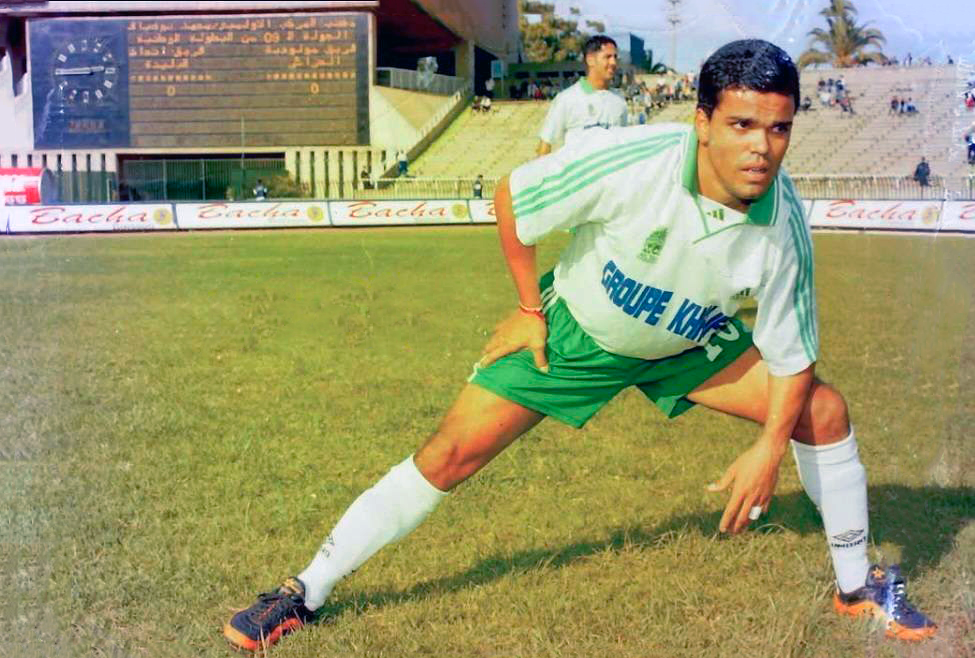
Piracaia (USM Blida 2001-02)

with USM Blida

- 2000-2001 : (22 matches, 3 goals, 6 assists)
- 2001-2002 : (28 matches, 1 goal, 15 assists)
