= Jardin d'essai Station =

Station of the Algiers Metro

Jardin d'essai
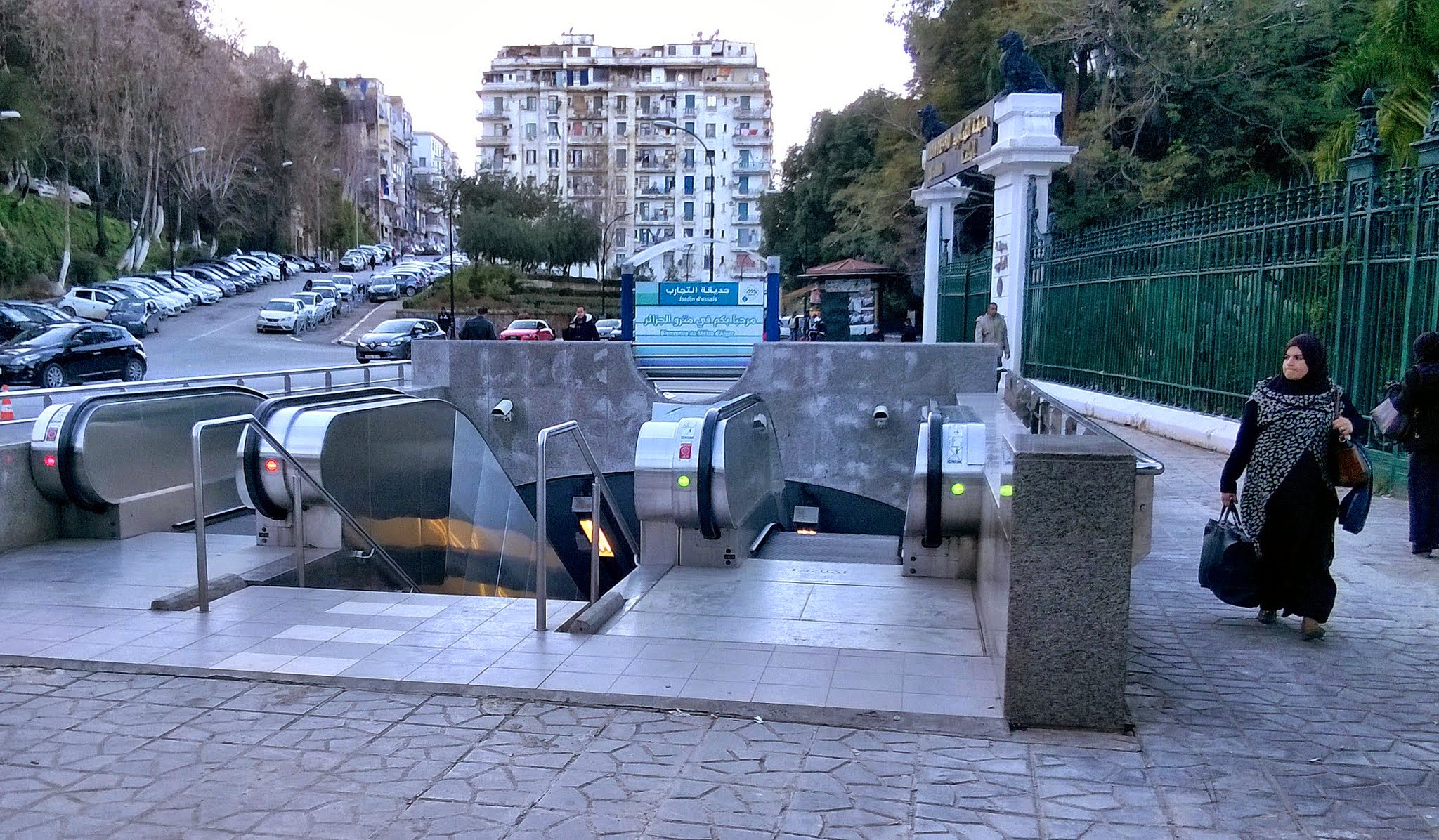
- El Anasser, Belouizdad, Algeria

General information
- Location: Belouizdad
- Coordinates: 36°44′49″N 3°04′20″E
- Line: Line 1
- Platforms: 2 side platforms at each line
- Tracks: 2 per line

Construction
- Accessible: yes

Other information
- Station code: JES

History
- Opened: November 1, 2011 (Line 1)

Services
Preceding station	Algiers Metro	Following station
Hamma towards Place des Martyrs	Line 1	Les Fusillés towards El Harrach Centre
Location

Jardin d'essai (Arabic: حديقة التجارب) is a transfer station serving the Line 1 of the Algiers Metro. It is located in Belouizdad, in the capital of Algeria, Algiers. It is a busy station on the Algiers Metro, especially on weekends and public holidays as it serves the Botanical Garden Hamma, the National Museum of Fine Arts of Algiers, and the Martyr's Memorial.

== History ==
Construction of the Jardin d'essai station of the Algiers metro was completed in 2009. It was however inaugurated 2 years later on 31 October 2011, and put into service on 1 November 2011 when 10 km of the first section of line 1, which only had ten stations, was opened.

== Interchange ==
Interchange is available at the station with the Téléphérique du Mémorial (Memorial Cable Car), connecting to the Martyr's Memorial and El Madania.
