= Statue of Wincenty Witos =

Monument in Warsaw, Poland

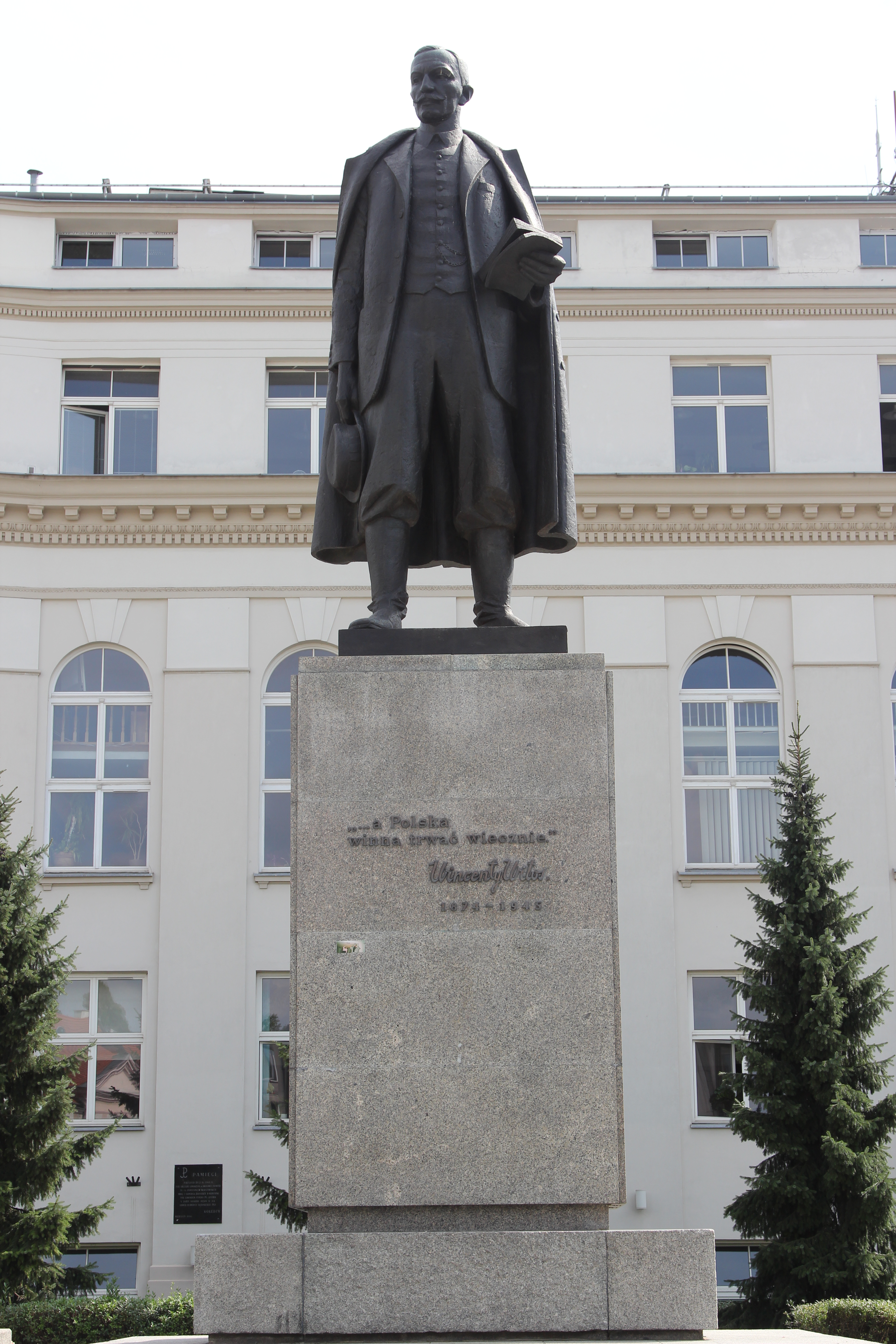
- The monument in 2019.
- Interactive map of Statue of Wincenty Witos
- Location: Three Crosses Square, Downtown, Warsaw, Poland
- Coordinates: 52.227698°N 21.023611°E
- Designer: Marian Konieczny
- Type: Statue
- Material: bronze (statue); granite (pedestal)
- Height: 6 m (total); 3 m (statue)
- Opening date: 22 September 1985
- Dedicated to: Wincenty Witos

The statue of Wincenty Witos (Polish: Pomnik Wincentego Witosa) is a monument in Warsaw, Poland, placed at the Three Crosses Square, within the Downtown district. It consists of a bronze statue of Wincenty Witos, a statesman and politician, who was the Prime Minister of Poland from 1920 to 1921, in 1923, and in 1926. It was designed by Marian Konieczny, and unveiled on 22 September 1985.

== History ==
The monument was designed by Marian Konieczny, and unveiled on 22 September 1985.

== Characteristics ==
The monument is placed at the Three Crosses Square, within the Downtown district. It consists of a bronze statue of Wincenty Witos, a statesman and politician, who was the Prime Minister of Poland from 1920 to 1921, in 1923, and in 1926. The figure wears a suit and a winter coat, and holds a book in the left hand, and a hat, in the right hand. It is placed on a large granite pedestal. Its front features a Polish inscription that reads "…a Polska winna trwać wiecznie" (transaction: and Poland should last forever), a Witos's quote, while the back, "Wielkiemu synowi polskiej wsi – Naród" (translation: To the great son of Polish countryside, the Nation). It has the total height of 6 m, with the statue being half of that.
