= Monument to the Heroes of Warsaw =

Monument in Warsaw, Poland

- Pomnik Bohaterów Warszawy (Warszawska Nike)
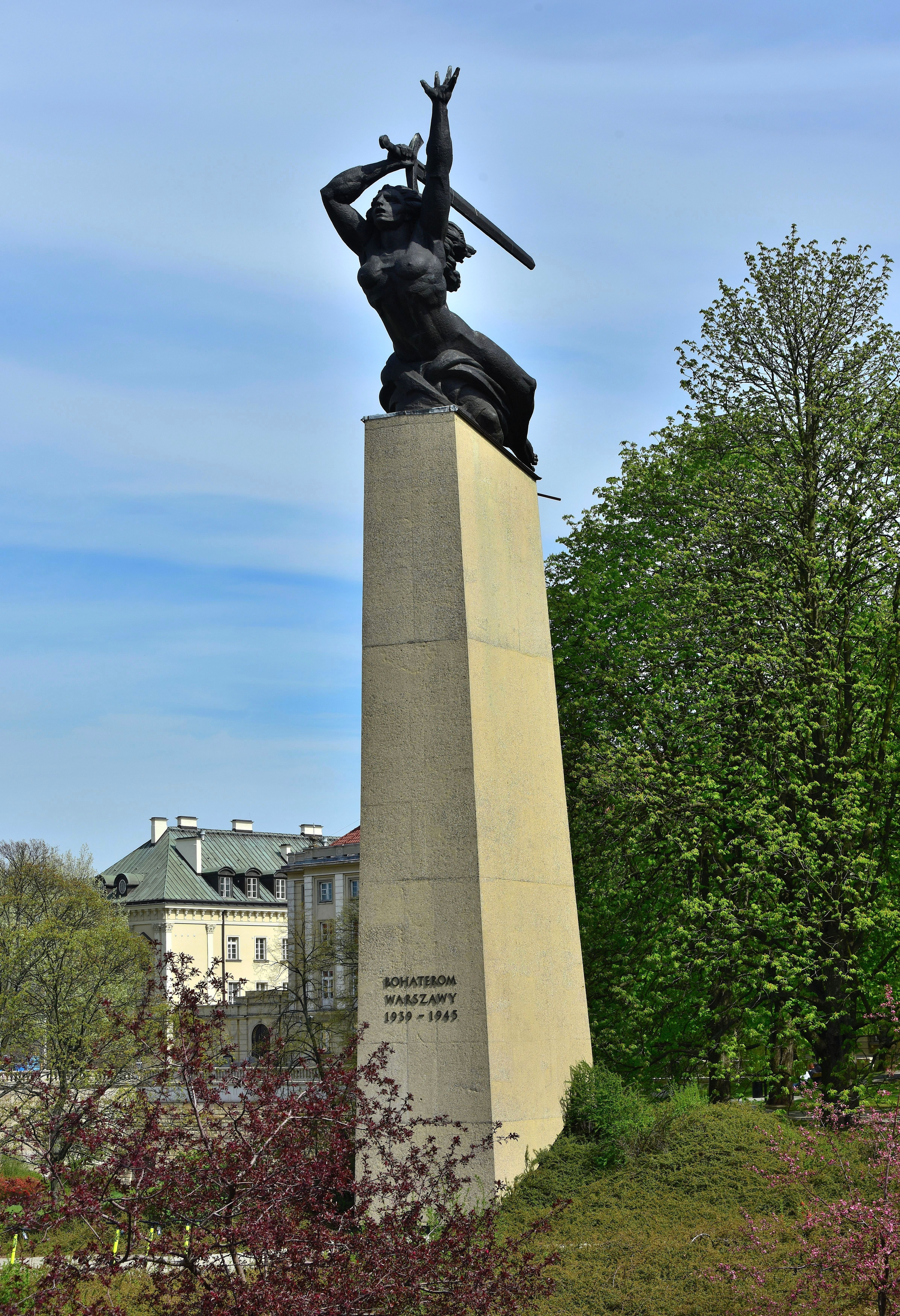
- Interactive map of Monument to the Heroes of Warsaw
- Coordinates: 52°14′45″N 21°00′33″E
- Designer: Marian Konieczny
- Length: 6 m (20 ft)
- Height: 7 m (23 ft)
- Opening date: 20 July 1964 (at the Theatre Square), 15 December 1997 (the current location)

The Monument to the Heroes of Warsaw, also known as the Warsaw Nike, is a statue located at the intersection of Nowy Przejazd (the New By-pass) and Aleja Solidarności (Solidarity Avenue) in Warsaw. The monument commemorates all those who died in the city in 1939 to 1945, including participants in the defense of Warsaw in September 1939, the participants of the Warsaw Ghetto Uprising and the Warsaw Uprising, and the victims of German terror in the occupied capital.

== History ==
The decision to erect the monument was taken on July 30, 1956 by the Metropolitan National Council (National Council of the City of Warsaw). The first competition announced in February 1957 had received 196 entries from home and abroad, but it was inconclusive. In January 1959 there was a second contest, with the participation of the laureates and recipients of honorable mentions in the first contest. Of the 106 entries, the Warsaw's Nike by the sculptor Marian Konieczny and architects Zagremma and Adam Konieczny has won.

The statue shows a reclining woman rising up with a sword raised above her head in her right hand and her left hand also raised. The 10-ton sculpture is seven meters tall and six meters long. On the granite pedestal is the inscription: To the heroes of Warsaw from 1939 to 1945 (Bohaterom Warszawy 1939−1945).

The sculpture was cast at the Gliwice Technical Equipment Plant (Gliwickie Zakłady Urządzeń Technicznych S.A.). The biggest challenge was casting the sword weighing about 1000 kg. The special design of steel bars embedded inside it makes it very strong, as, in the wind, the sword can deviate from its position by up to 15 cm. The monument was transported in two parts from Silesia to Warszawa Gdańska station, north of the site.

The monument was unveiled on July 20, 1964 in Theatre Square, in front of the Grand Theatre (where the reconstructed Jabłonowski Palace now stands).

The construction of the monument was financed by social contributions and the Social Capital Reconstruction Fund.

== Relocation ==
In the early 1990s, in connection with the restoration project north of the Theatre Square, it was necessary to move the monument to a new location.

On November 14, 1995 the monument was taken down from its pedestal and placed temporarily behind the reconstruction of the Jabłonowski Palace. An adaptation of the monument in its new location was commissioned from its designer, Marian Konieczny. During this work there was a disagreement about the height of the plinth. Marian Konieczny imagined Nike soaring into the clouds, and planned to place the monument on a very high 20-meter pedestal. The authorities disagreed, proposing a pedestal 6.5 meters high. Eventually, a compromise was reached with a plinth height of 14 meters.

The new base was designed by Marta Pinkiewicz-Woźniakowska. Since the monument was to be erected on the slope of an embankment made of rubble, it was necessary to create a deep foundation. The base is made of reinforced concrete imitating natural stone.

On December 15, 1997 the sculpture was placed on the new pedestal at its new location.

== See also ==
- Warsaw Mermaid
- Warsaw Unicorn

== Bibliography ==
- Lech Chmielewski Przewodnik warszawski: gawęda o nowej Warszawie, "Omnipress" Warszawa 1987 ISBN 8385028560
- Wiesław Głębocki: Warszawskie pomniki. Warszawa: Wydawnictwo PTTK "Kraj", s. 42-44. ISBN 83-7005-211-8.
- Irena Grzesiuk-Olszewska: Warszawska rzeźba pomnikowa. Warszawa: Wydawnictwo Neriton, 2003, s. 121-123. ISBN 83-88973-59-2.
