= Marian Konieczny =

Polish sculptor (1930–2017)

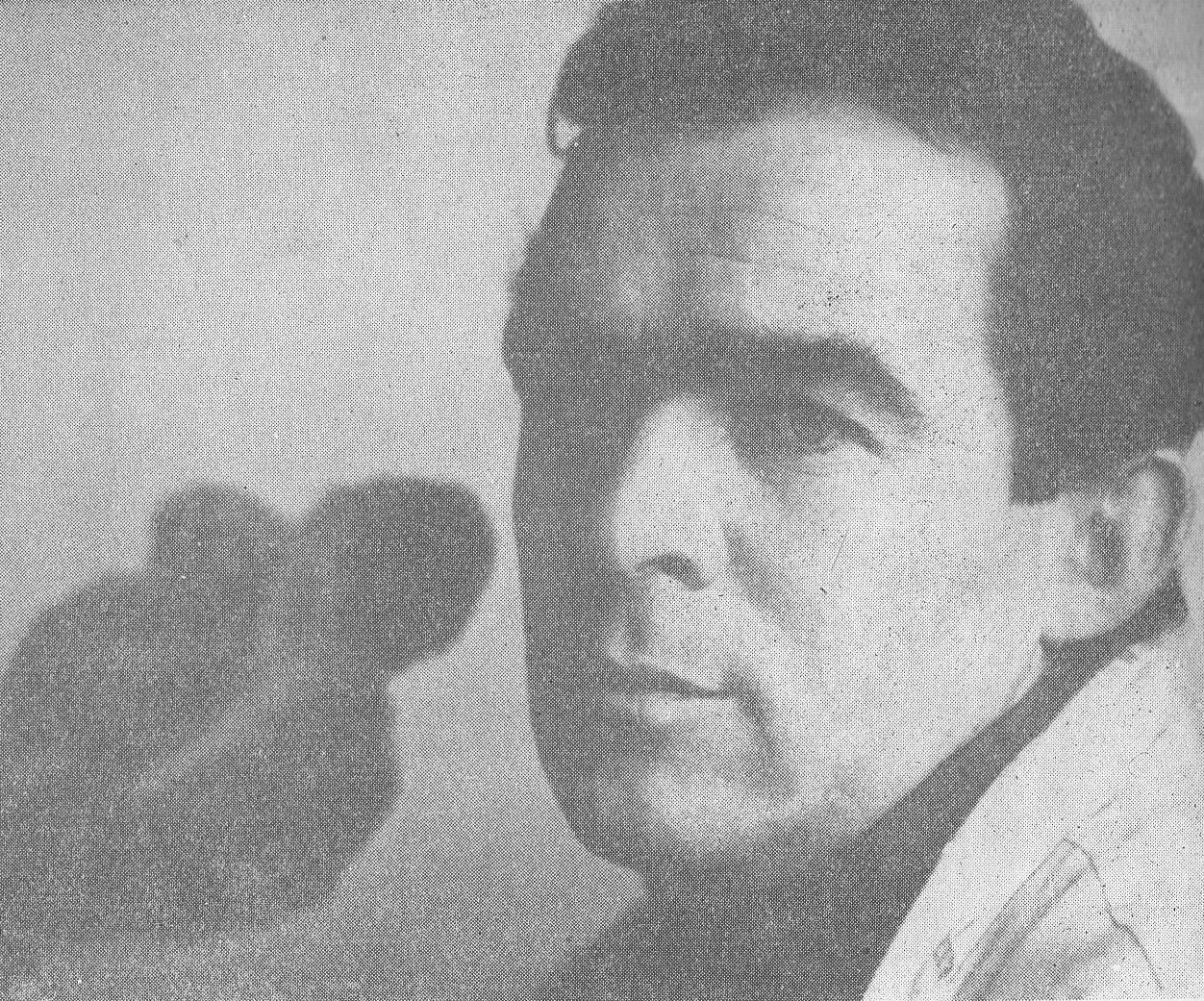
- Marian Konieczny in 1960s
- Born: 13 January 1930; Jasionów, Second Polish Republic
- Died: 25 July 2017 (aged 87); Jaroszowiec, Poland
- Education: Jan Matejko Academy of Fine Arts
- Known for: sculpture
- Notable work: Grunwald Monument in Kraków; Monument to the Heroes of Warsaw, Warsaw; Revolution Monument in Rzeszów; Martyrs' Memorial in Algiers Apollo's Fountain in Poznań; Jan Zamoyski Statue in Zamość

Marian Adam Konieczny (13 January 1930 – 25 July 2017) was a Polish sculptor and politician, Professor and Dean at the Faculty of Sculpture of the Jan Matejko Academy of Fine Arts in Kraków.

== Life ==
A 1954 graduate of the Akademia Sztuk Pięknych w Krakowie (Jan Matejko Academy of Fine Arts) in Kraków, Konieczny was a student of Xawery Dunikowski. He was a professor and rector of the Academy from 1972 to 1981. Konieczny sculpted many notable monuments, such as the Warsaw Nike, Martyrs Memorial in Algiers, General Tadeusz Kosciuszko in Philadelphia and Pope John Paul II in Leżajsk. His monument of Vladimir Lenin in Nowa Huta was the biggest Lenin's monument in Poland, removed in 1989. Lenin's heel was damaged in 1979 as the result of a weak explosion.

Konieczny died in Jasionów, Podkarpackie Voivodeship, on 25 July 2017 at the age of 87.

== Gallery ==
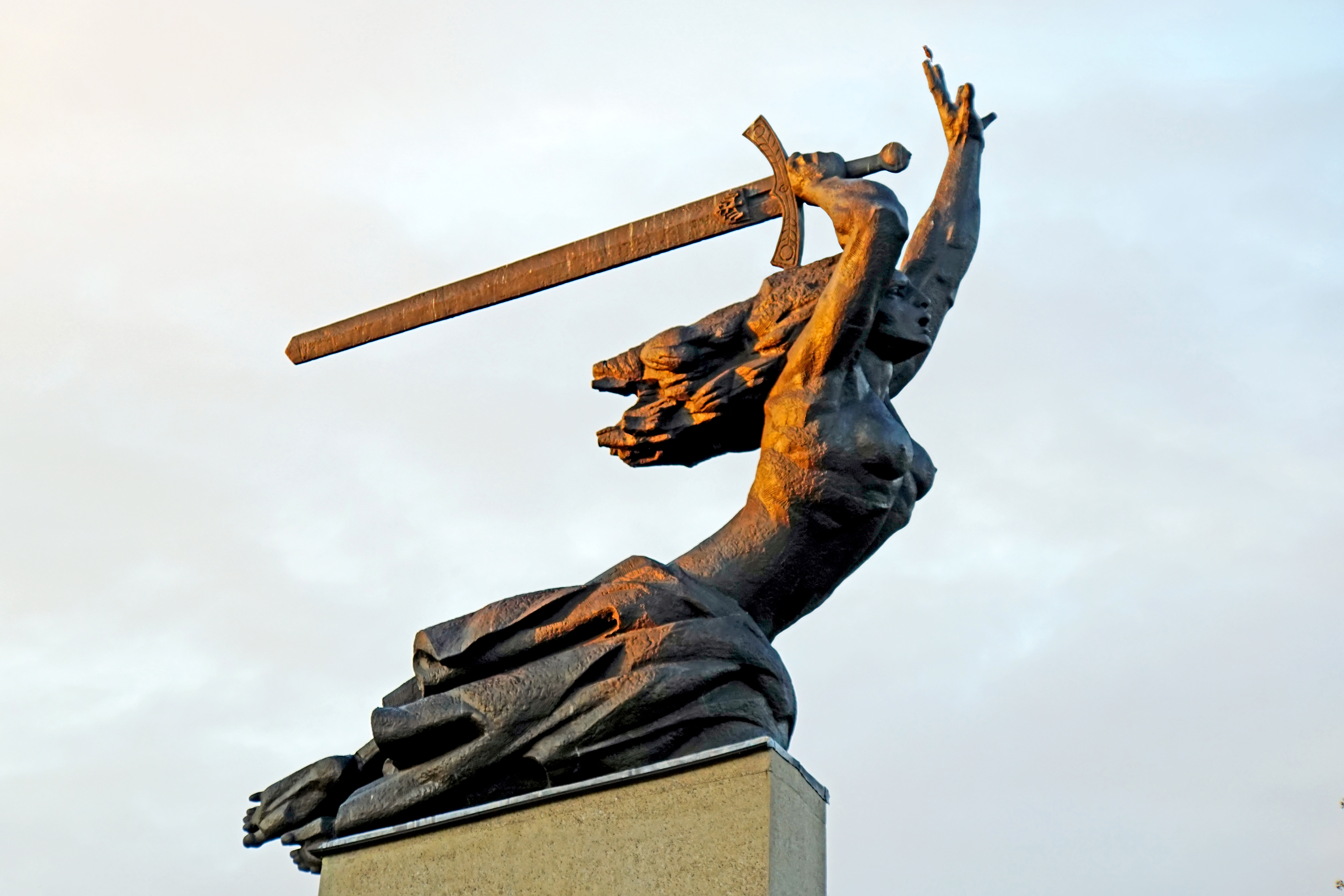
Monument to the Heroes of Warsaw, also known as the Warsaw Nike

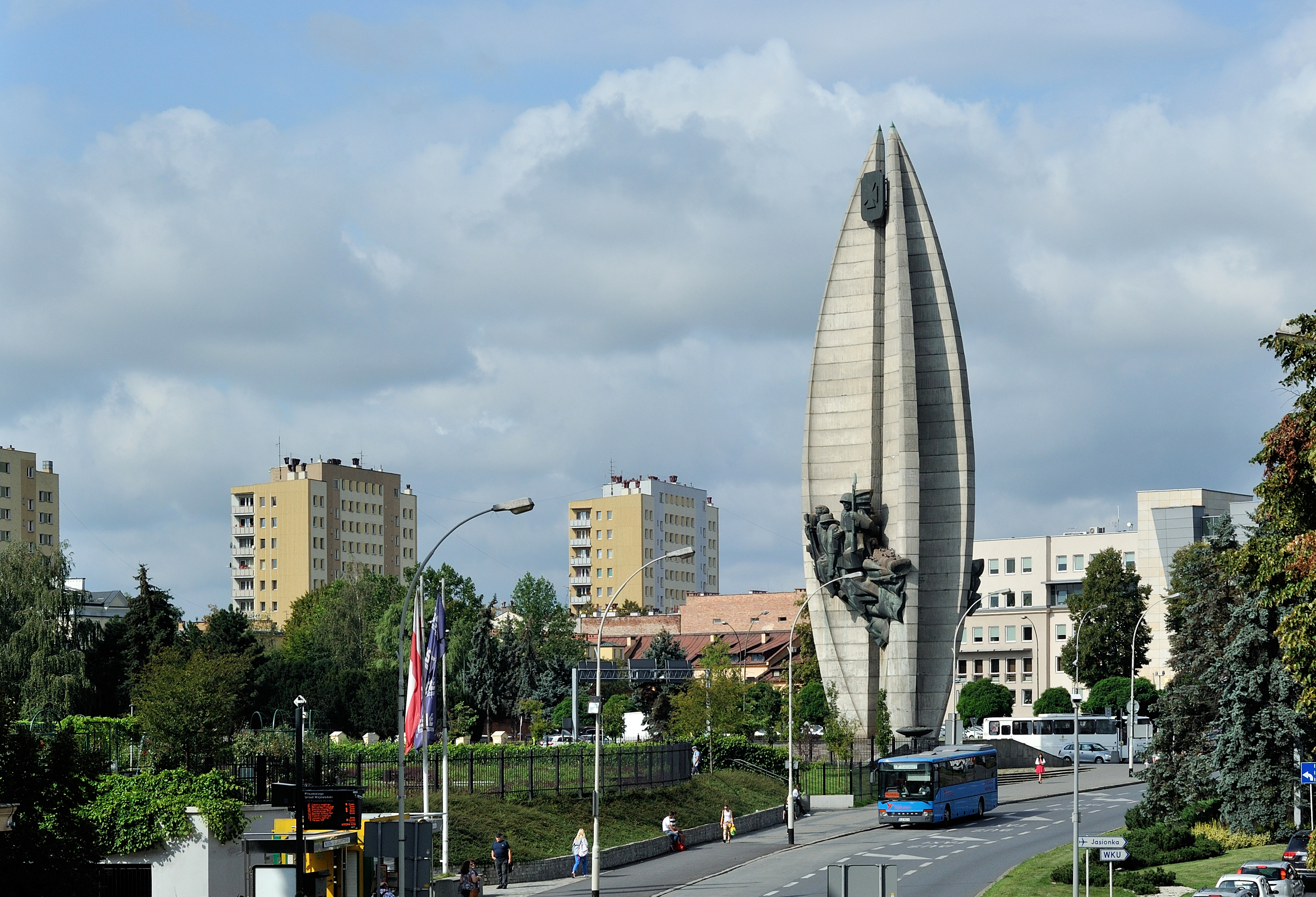
Revolution Monument in Rzeszów

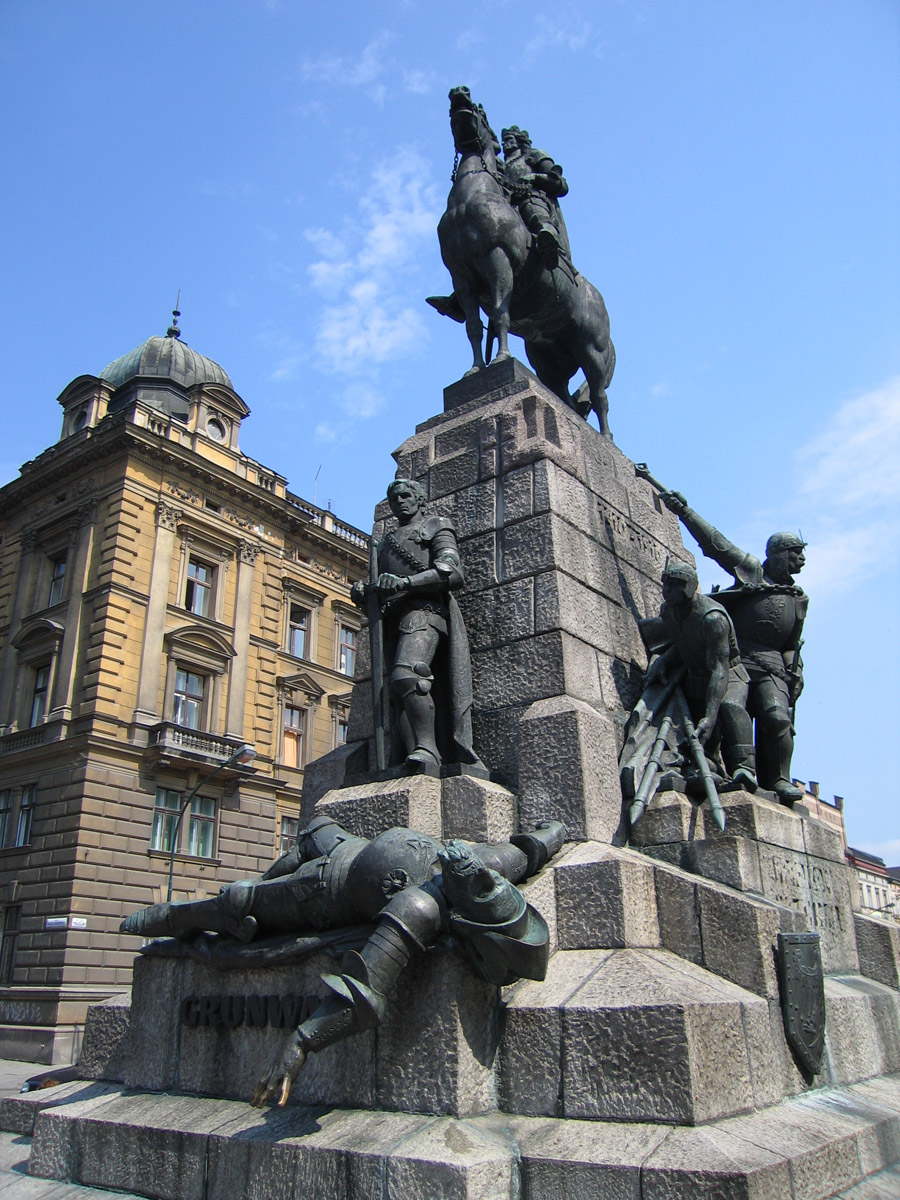
Grunwald Monument in Kraków (reconstruction)

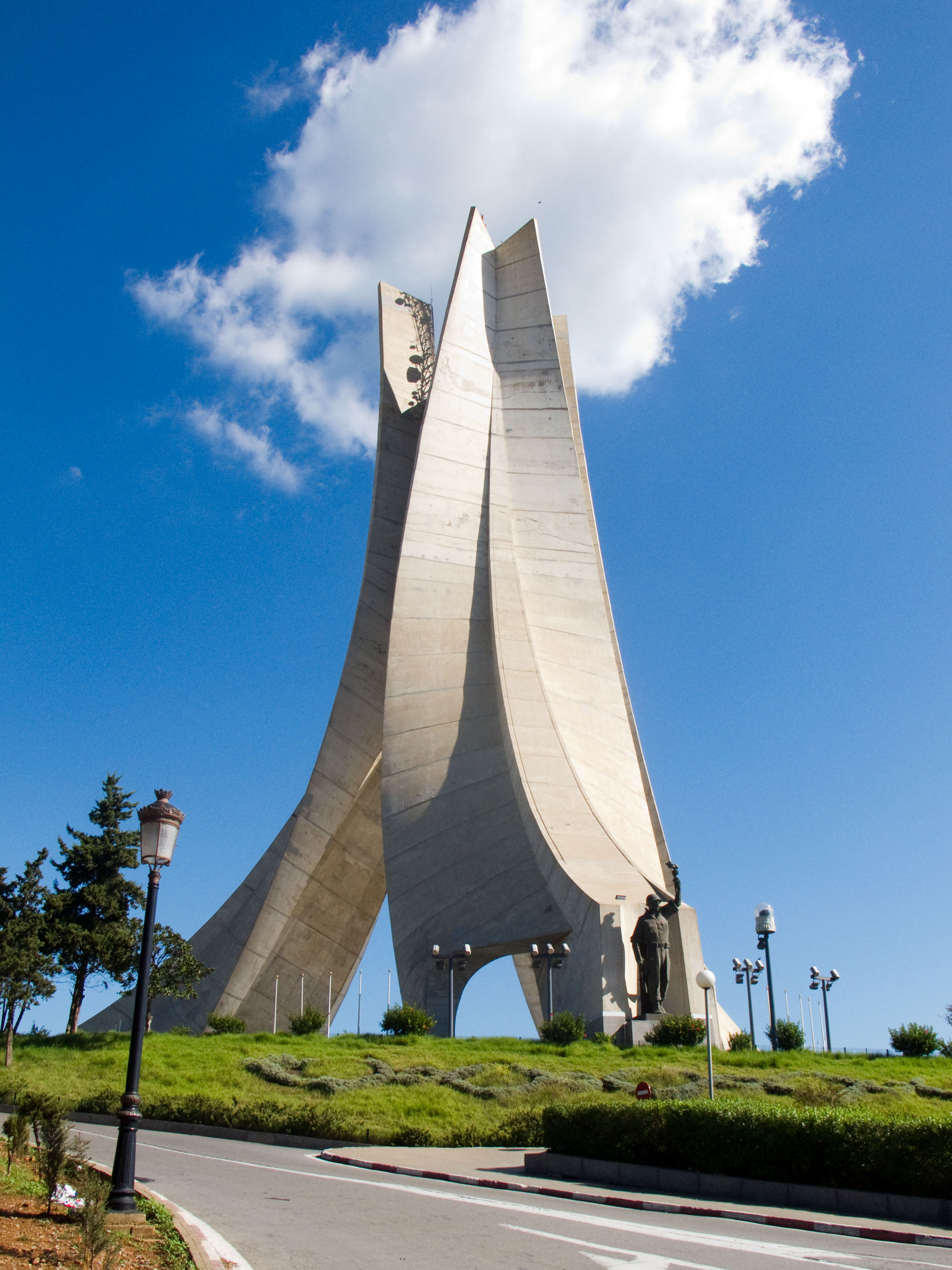
Martyrs' Memorial in Algiers

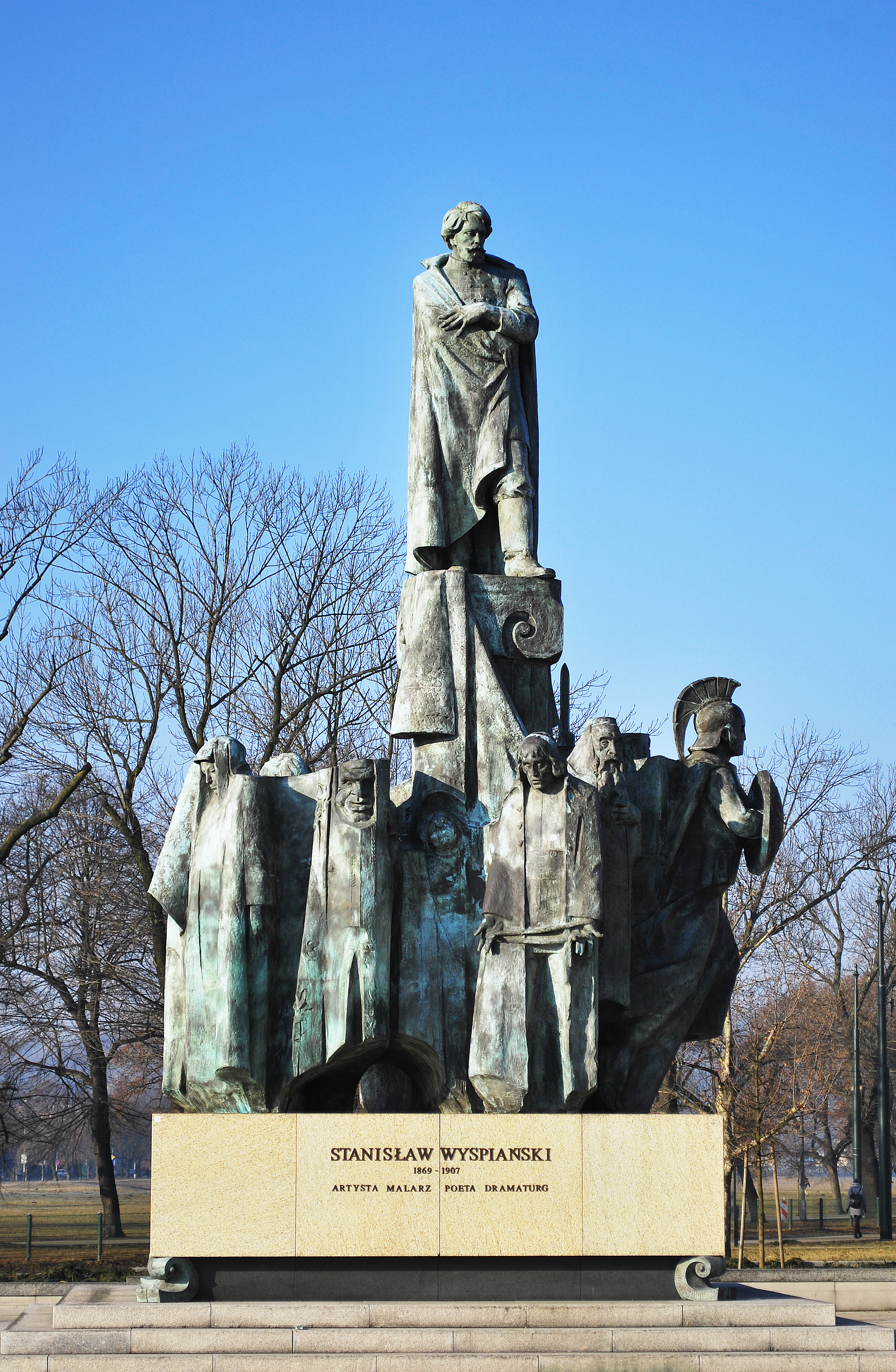
The Stanisław Wyspiański Monument in Kraków

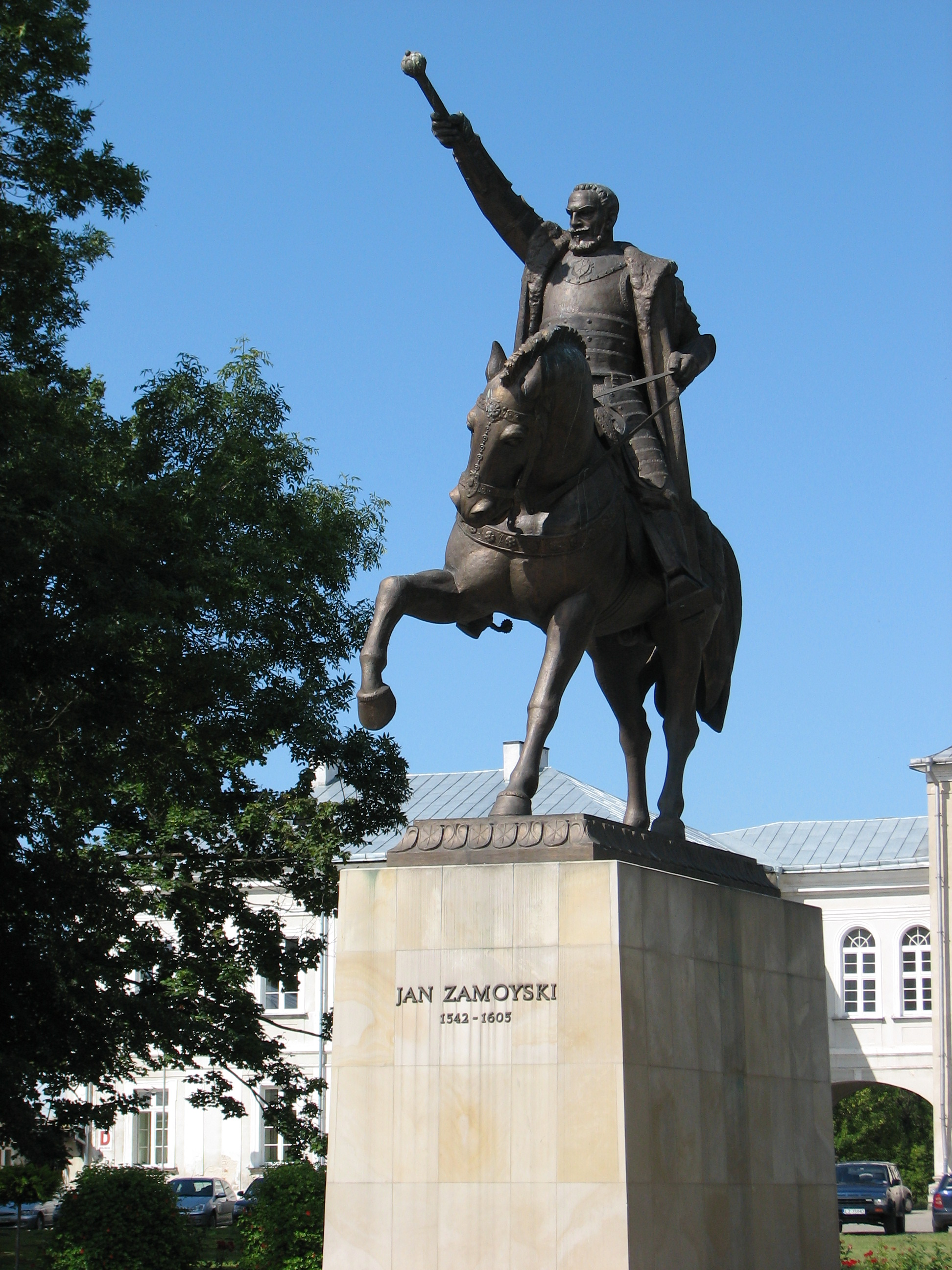
The equestrian statue of Jan Zamoyski in Zamość

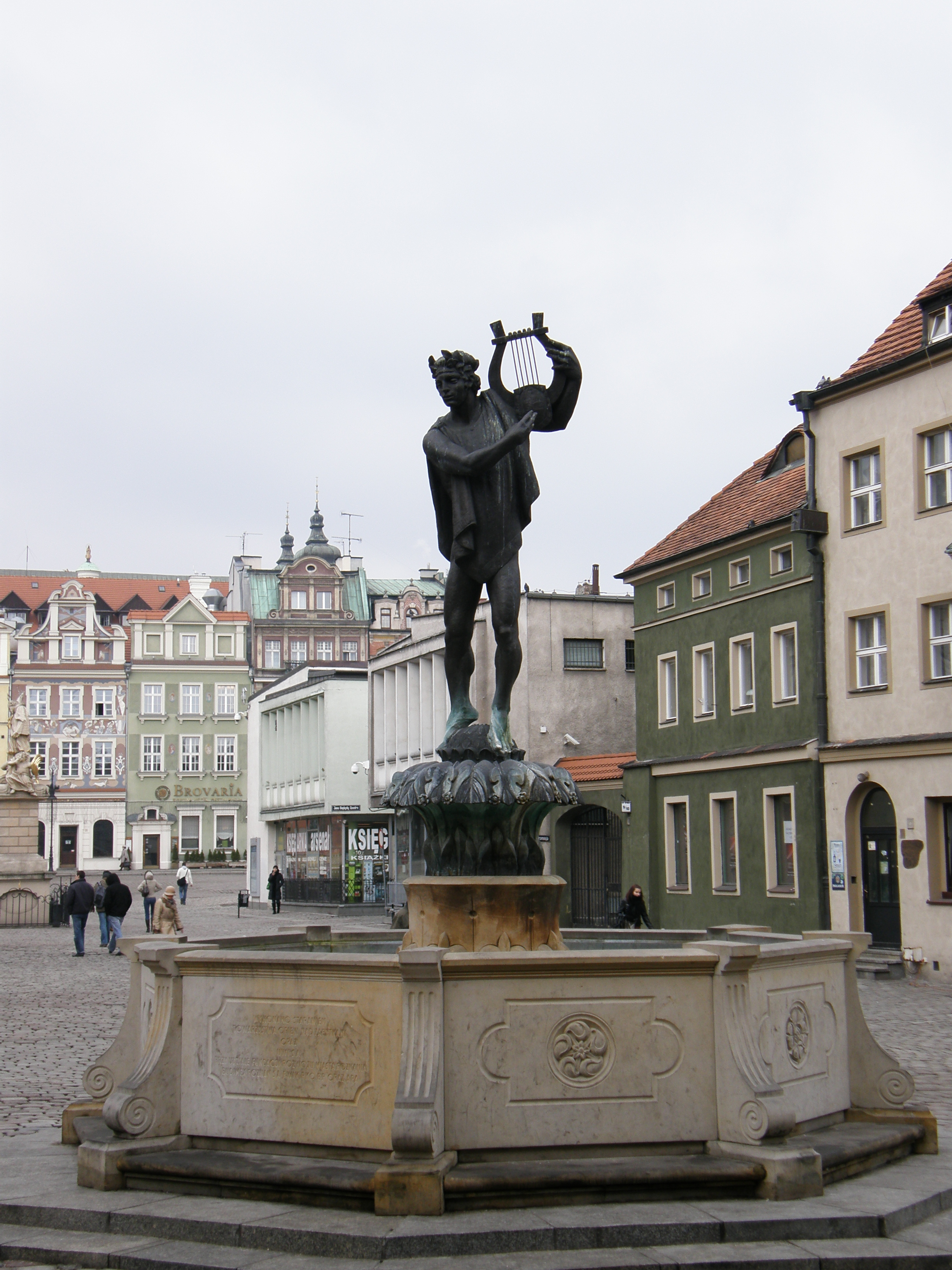
Apollo's Fountain at Poznań Market Square

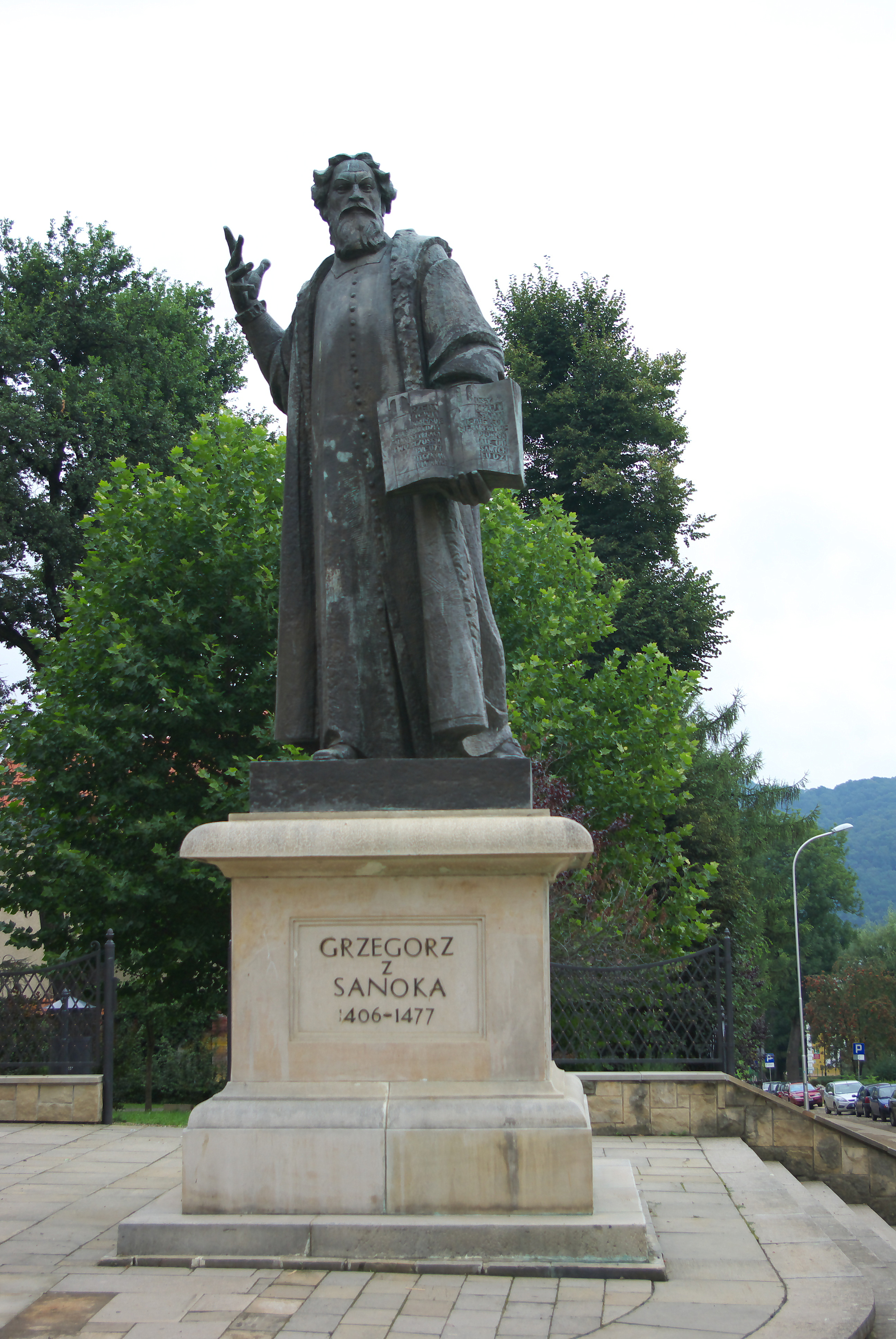
Grzegorz of Sanok Monument in Sanok

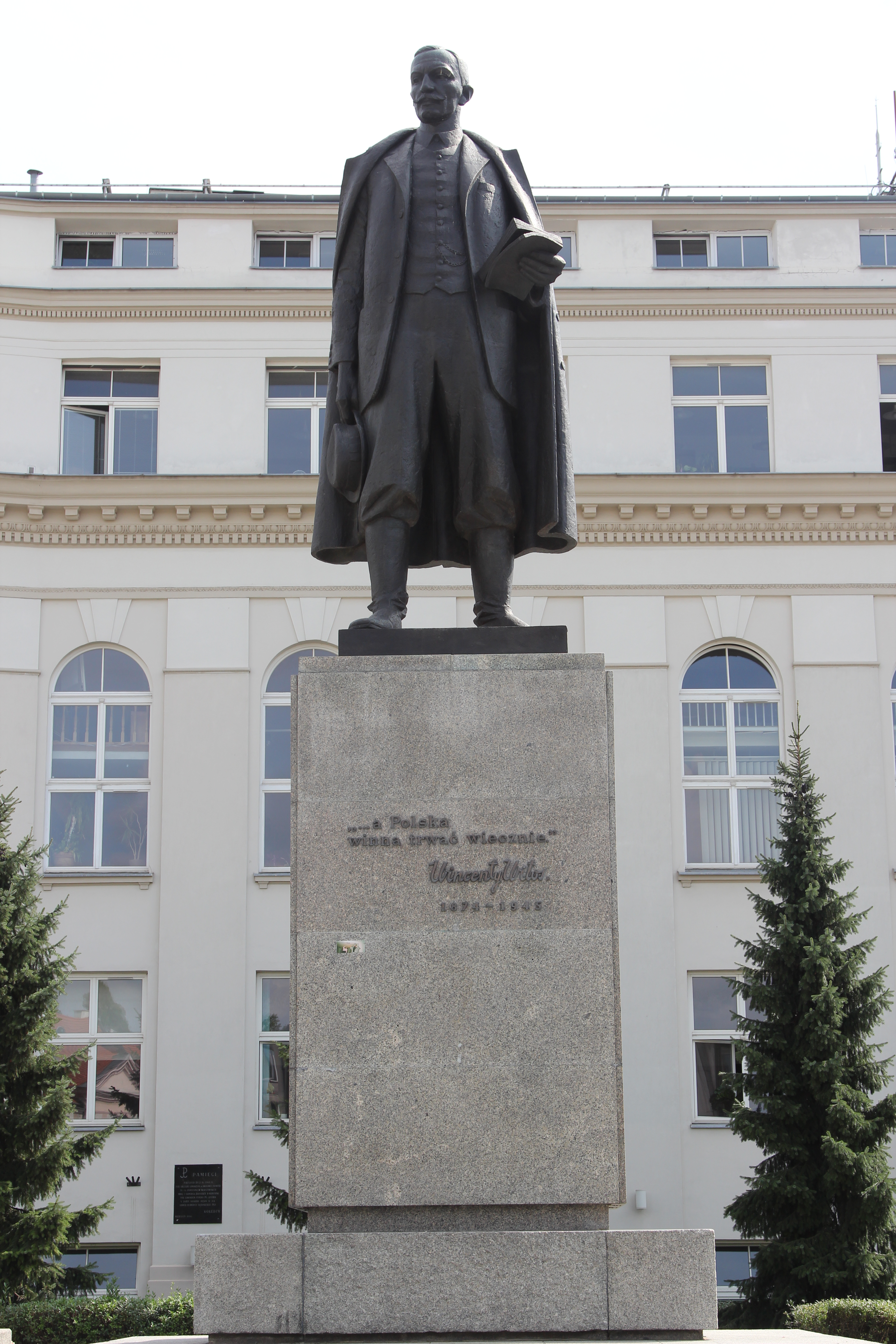
Wincenty Witos Monument in Warsaw

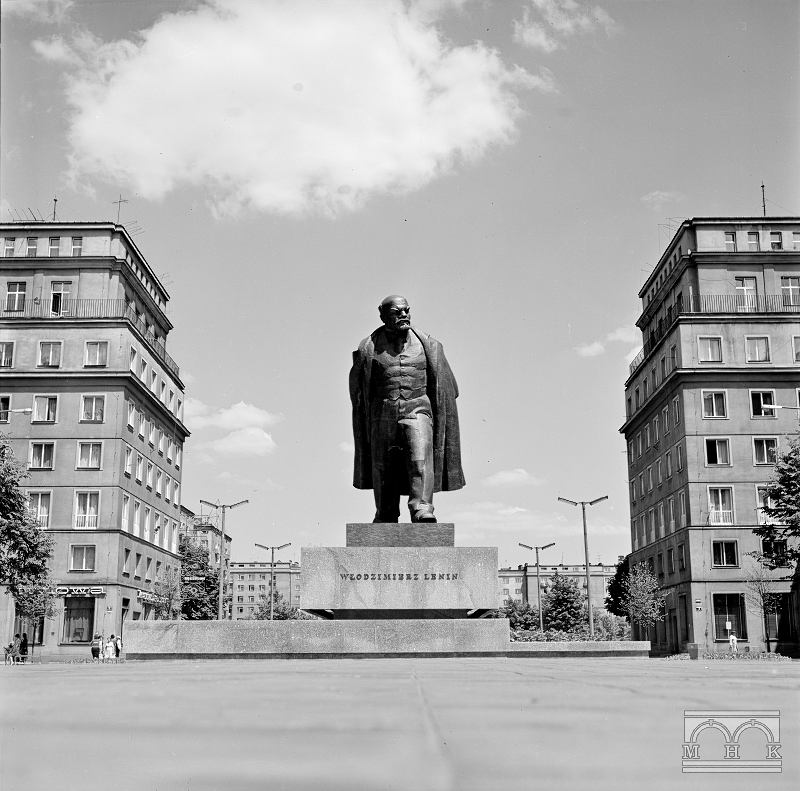
Vladimir I. Lenin monument in Nowa Huta, Kraków

== Awards ==
In 1999, he was awarded Commander's Cross with Star of the Order of Polonia Restituta by President Aleksander Kwaśniewski. In 2009, he was awarded the Gold Medal for Merit to Culture – Gloria Artis.

== See also ==
- Art of Poland

== Bibliography ==
- Loranc, Władysław (1967). Marian Konieczny. Biografia rzeźbiarza. Kraków: Wydawnictwo Literackie.
- Marian Konieczny. Katalog rzeźb. Kraków: Unidruk. 2003. ISBN 8387550086.
- Skrobot, Jerzy (2009). Kształty pamięci. Rzecz o Marianie Koniecznym. Kraków: Promotor. ISBN 9788392725237.
