= Maqam Echahid =

Monument in Algiers, Algeria

Martyrs Memorial
- مقام الشهيد
- Algeria
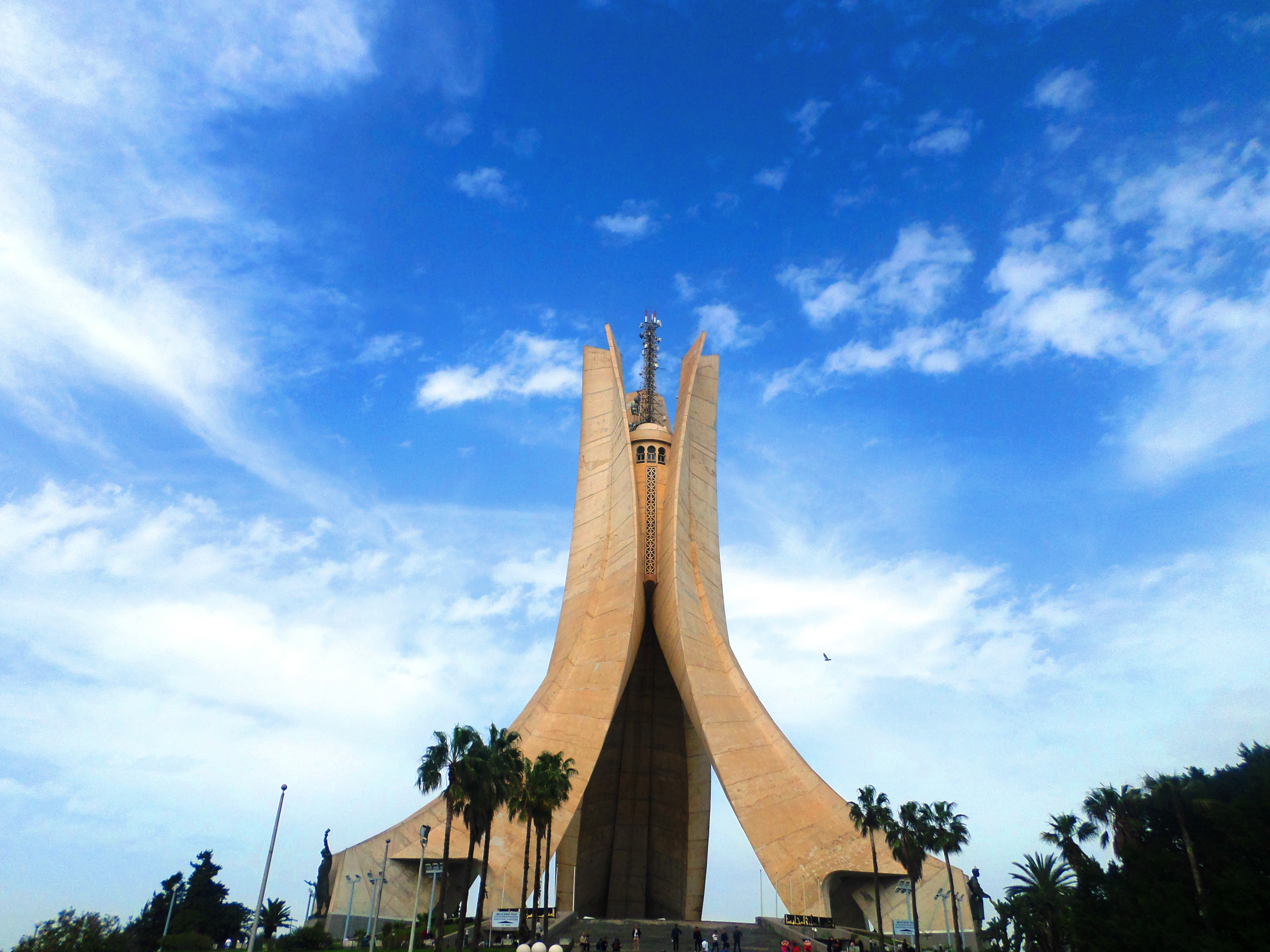
- For Heroes killed in action during the Algerian war of independence
- Unveiled: 1982
- Location: 36°44′45″N 3°4′11″E in Algiers, Algeria
- Designed by: Bachir Yelles, Marian Konieczny

The Maqam Echahid (Arabic: مقام الشهيد, Maqāmu š-šahīd, Arabic pronunciation: [maqaːmu ʃːahiːd], Kabyle: Asmektay n umeɣras/ⴰⵙⵎⴽⵜⴰⵢ ⵏ ⵓⵎⴻⵖⵔⴰⵙ, English: Martyr's Memorial) is a concrete monument commemorating the Algerian War. The monument was opened on July 5, 1982, on the 20th anniversary of Algeria's independence. It is fashioned in the shape of three standing palm leaves, which shelter the "Eternal Flame" under it. At the edge of each palm leaf is a statue of a soldier representing a stage of Algeria's struggle for independence.

== Location ==
The Martyrs Memorial is located on the heights of Algiers, in the municipality of El Madania, west of the Bois des arcades, east of Diar el Mahçoul and north of the plaza shopping center Riadh El Feth. It overlooks the neighborhood of Hamma (commune of Belouizdad) and Botanical Garden Hamma (known as Jardin d'essai) in the north. The monument has been erected on the site of an ancient military fort.

== Description ==
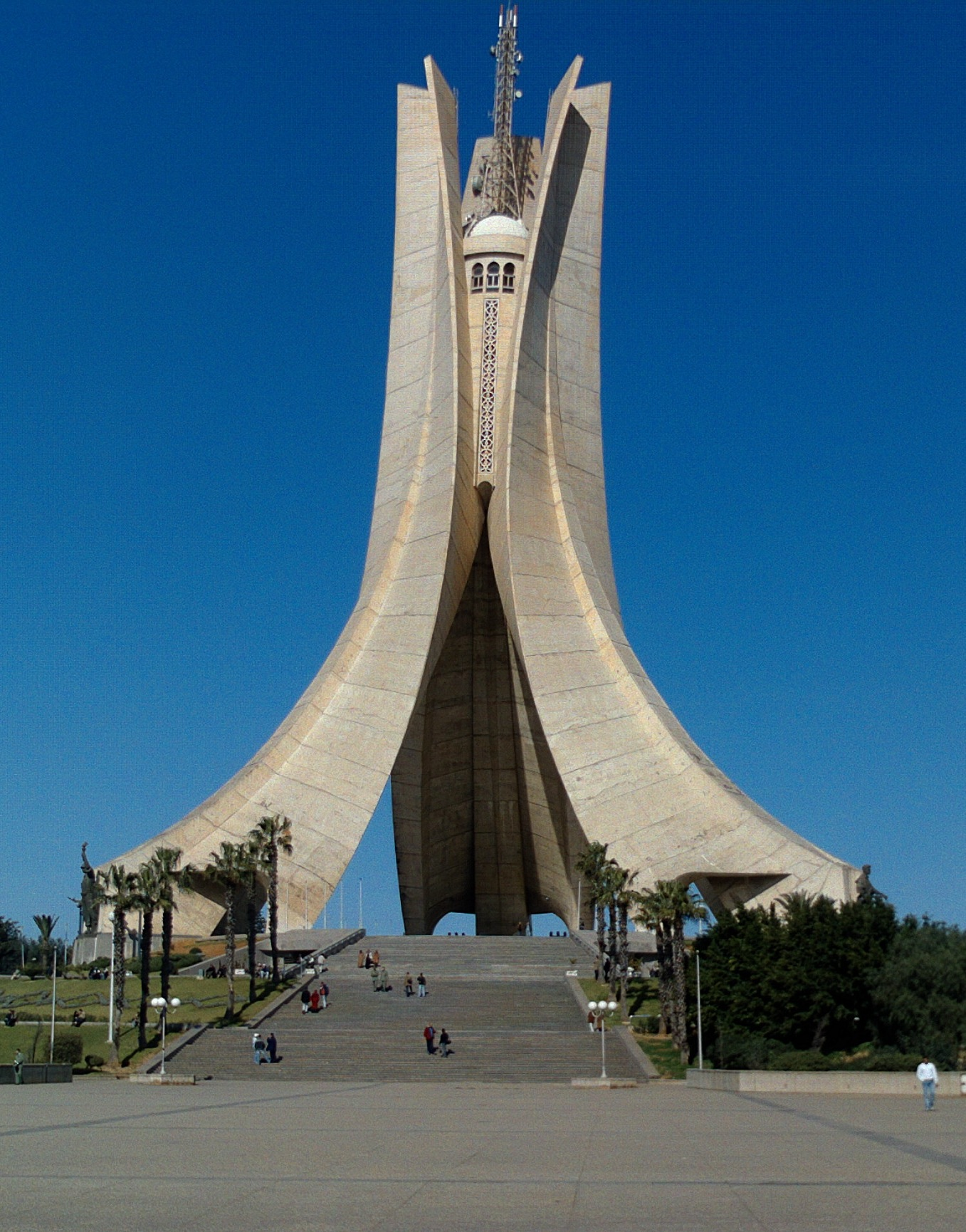
Martyrs Memorial

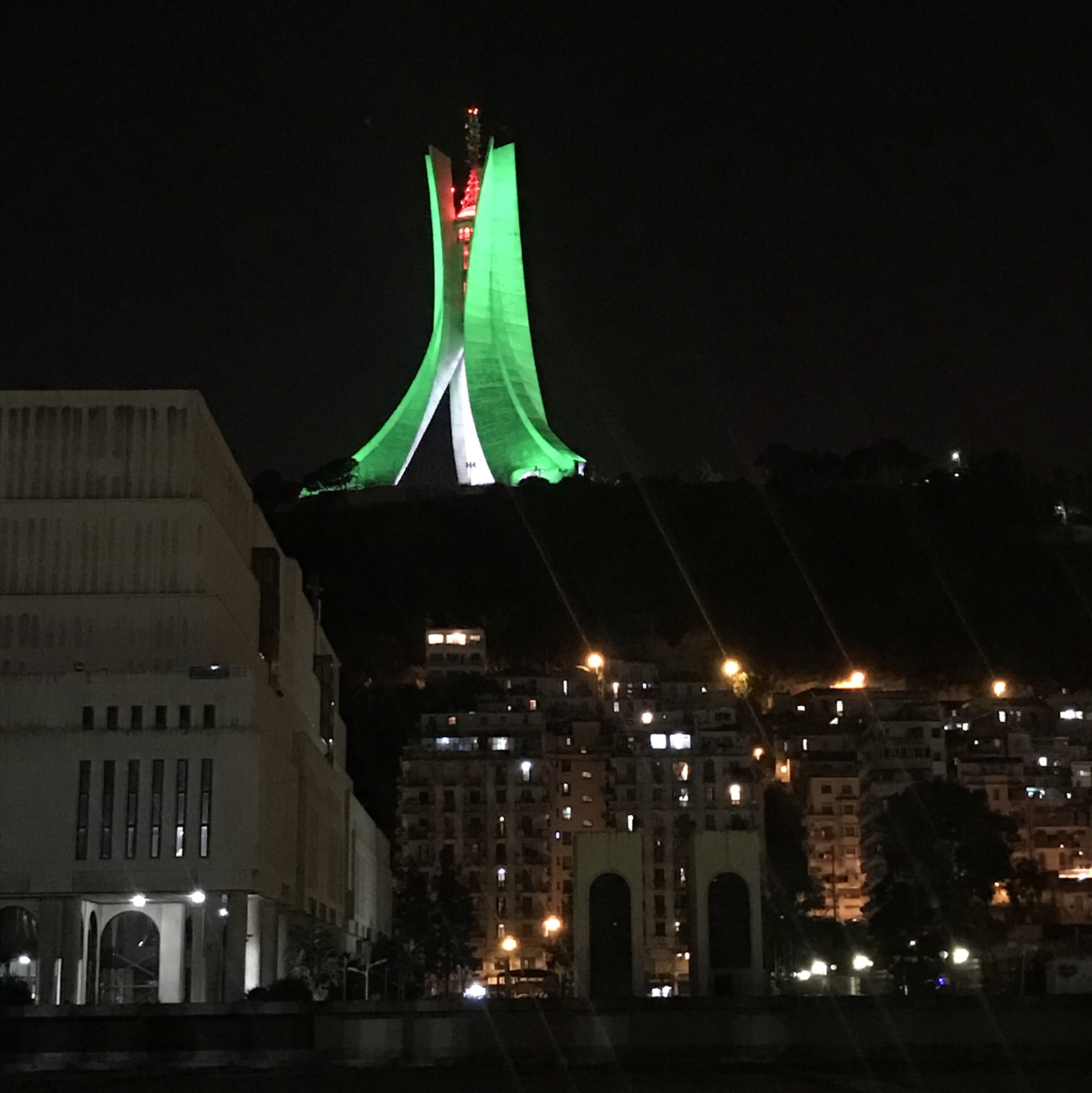
The monument illuminated by its dynamic LED system, which was upgraded in 2017 to enhance visibility across Algiers.

Consisting of three stylized fins that join mid-height, the concrete monument built by the Canadian company Lavalin, based on a model produced in the Fine Art Institute of Algiers, under the leadership of Bashir Yelles, reaches a height of 96 metres (315 ft). Above the three supporting fins, at 14 metres (45 ft) from the ground, is an Islamic style turret with a diameter of 10 metres (33 ft) and a height of 7.6 metres (25 ft), topped by a dome of 6 metres (20 ft). It rests on an esplanade that burns an "eternal flame" and includes a crypt, an amphitheater and the National Museum of El Mujahid (underground). In 2017, the monument's lighting system was modernized with a dynamic LED scheme comprising 40 floodlights, making the structure visible from up to 35 km away across the Bay of Algiers.

== Construction ==
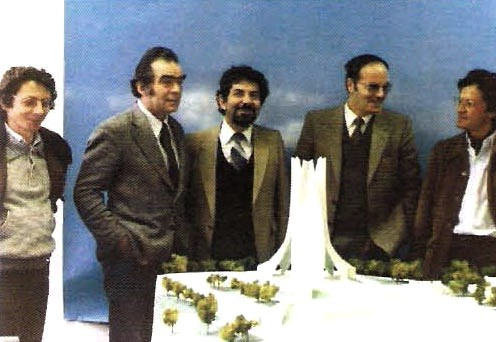
Bachir Yelles the architect at the middle

The project to build a memorial in memory of the dead from the War of Independence is the brainchild of President Houari Boumedienne. Its implementation was, however, completed under the presidency of his successor Chadli Bendjedid.

The company Lavalin was responsible for the studies and construction of the monument. Several Algerian artists were involved, like the painter Bashir Yelles, the calligrapher Abdelhamid Skander and the Polish sculptor Marian Konieczny.

The completion of the work was a real technological challenge because of the constraints inherent to the geometry of the assembly, especially the curvature of the fins, the situation of the site at the edge of a steep cliff and high seismicity of the region. Pierre Lamarre, director of engineering and structural design, Claude Naud, expert planning and construction methods, along with Bashir Yelles, imagined a solution that proved itself decisive and innovative.

Seven months (7 months and 20 days) (November 15, 1981 to July 5, 1982) were necessary to build this architectural work. The monument was inaugurated by the then President Chadli Bendjedid.

== Gallery ==
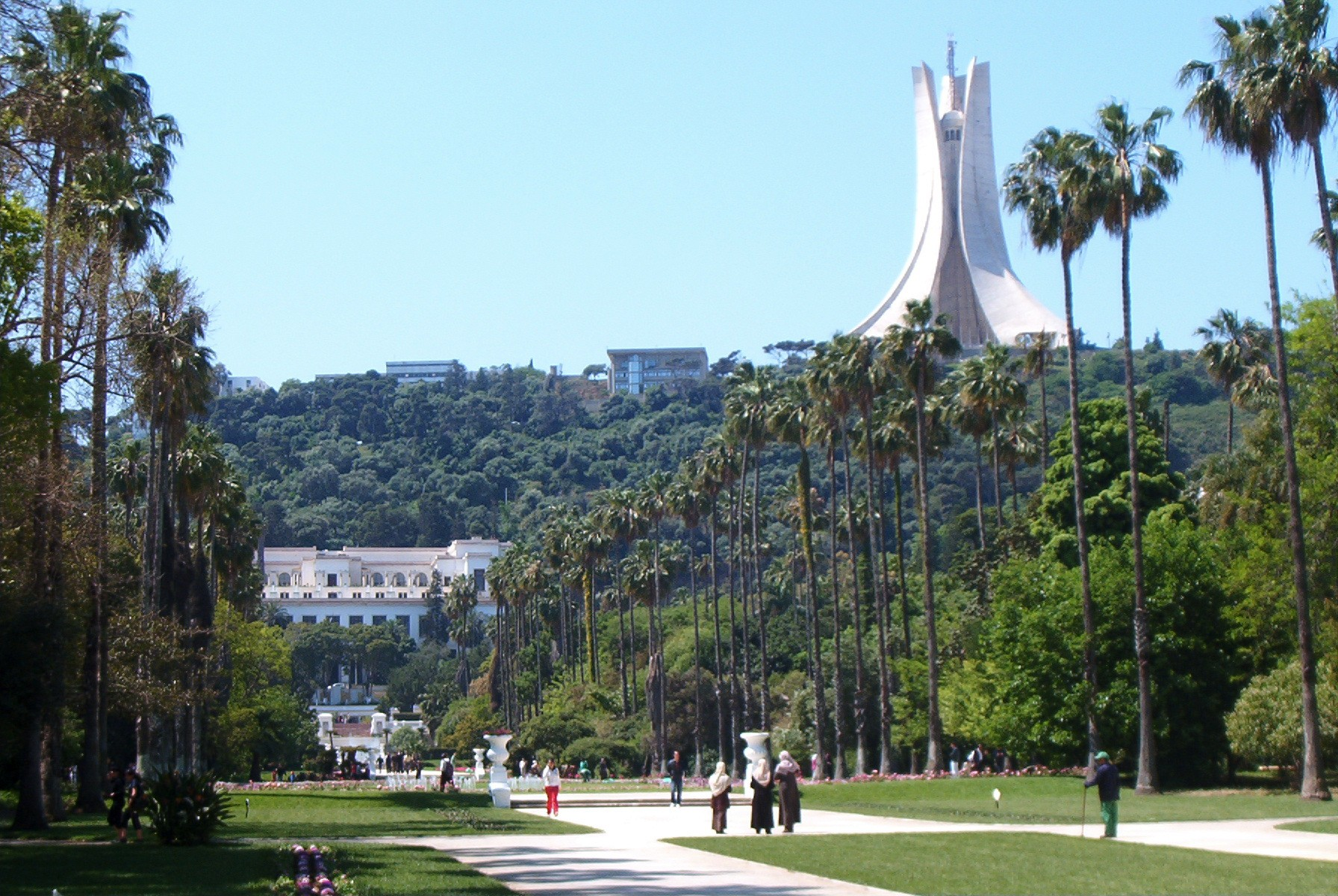
A panoramic view of Maqam Echahid as seen from the Botanical Garden Hamma in Algiers, Algeria.

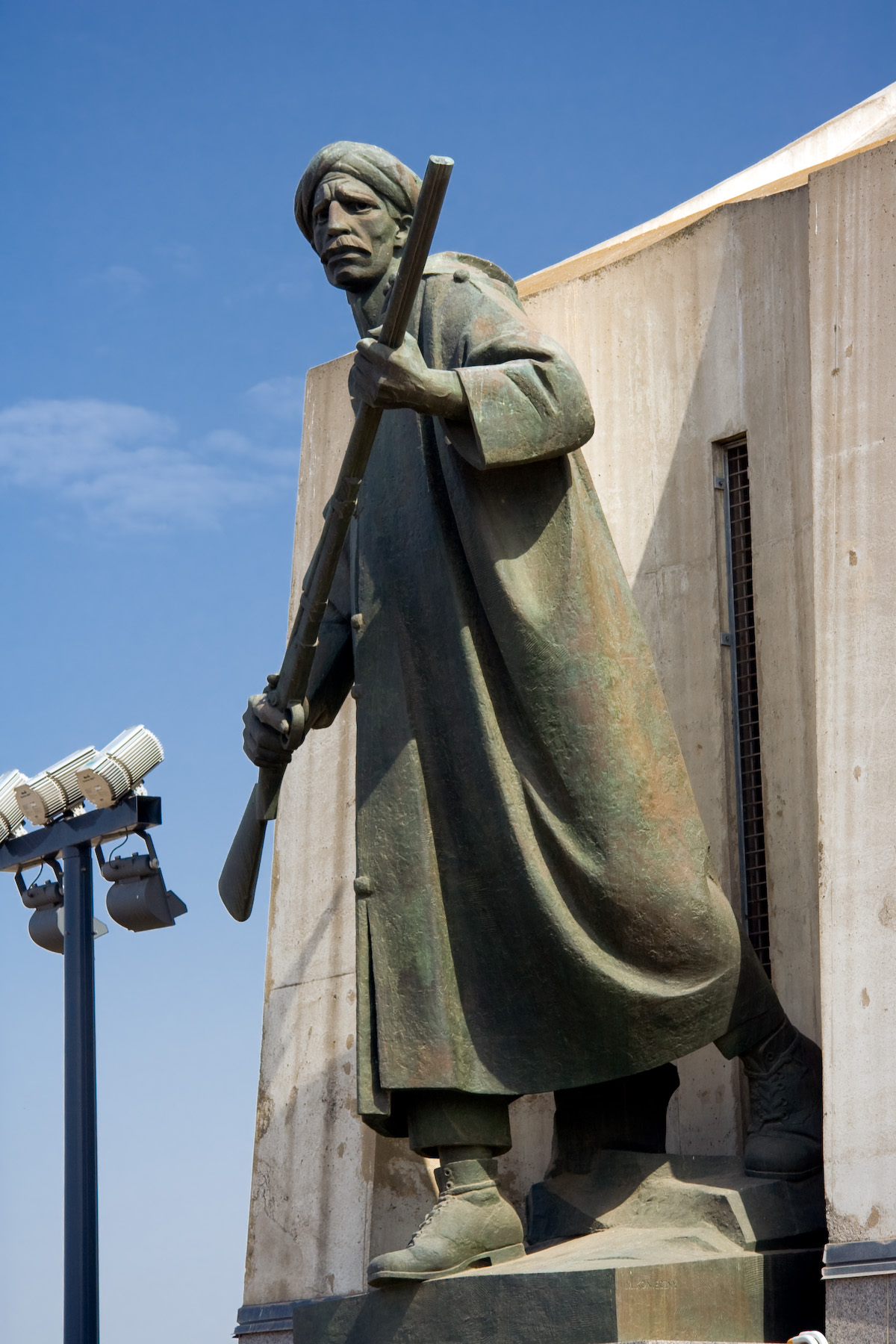
Bronze statue symbolizing the Popular Resistance (1830-1954)

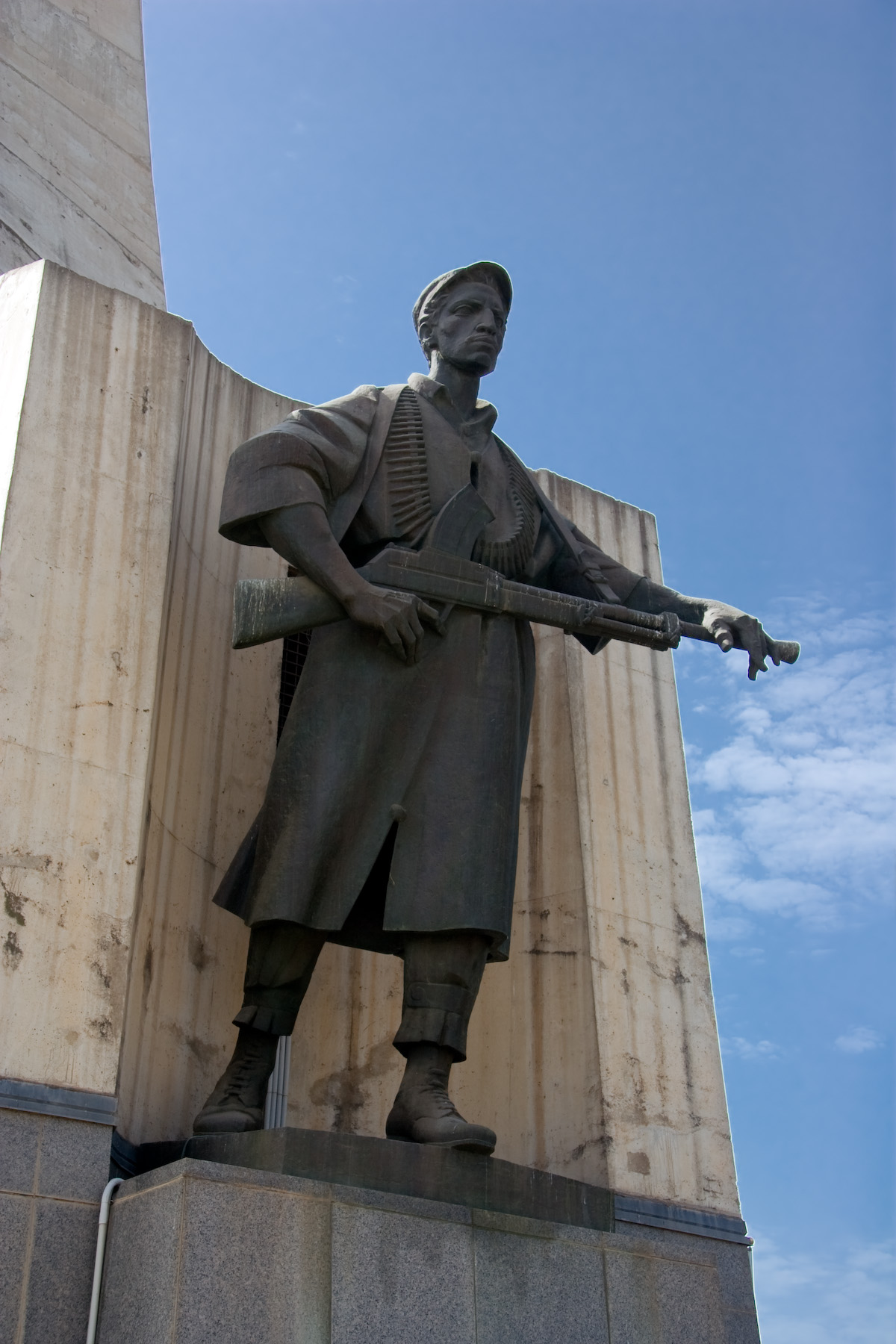
Bronze statue symbolizing the National Liberation Army (1954-1962)

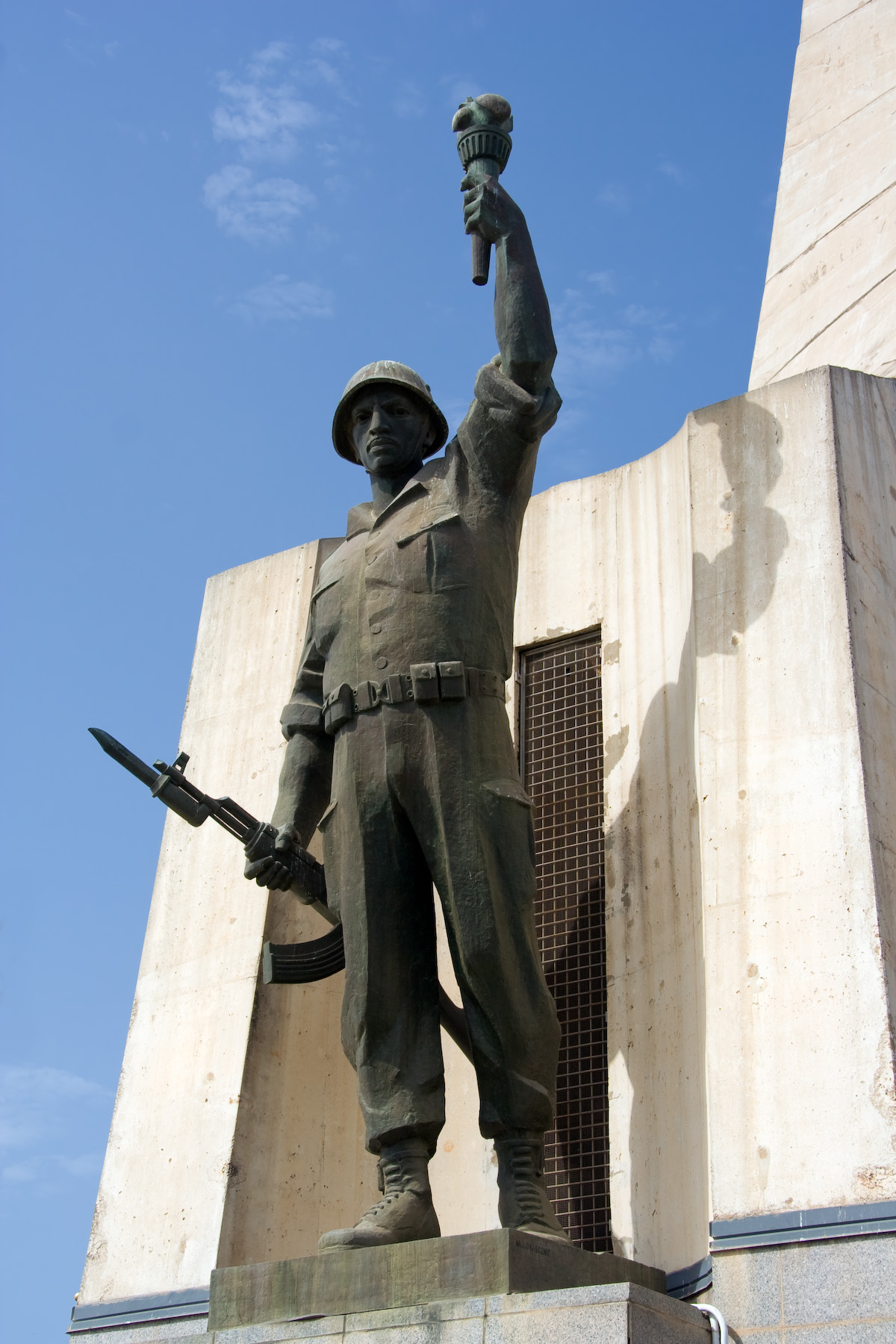
Bronze statue symbolizing the People's National Army (post-independence)

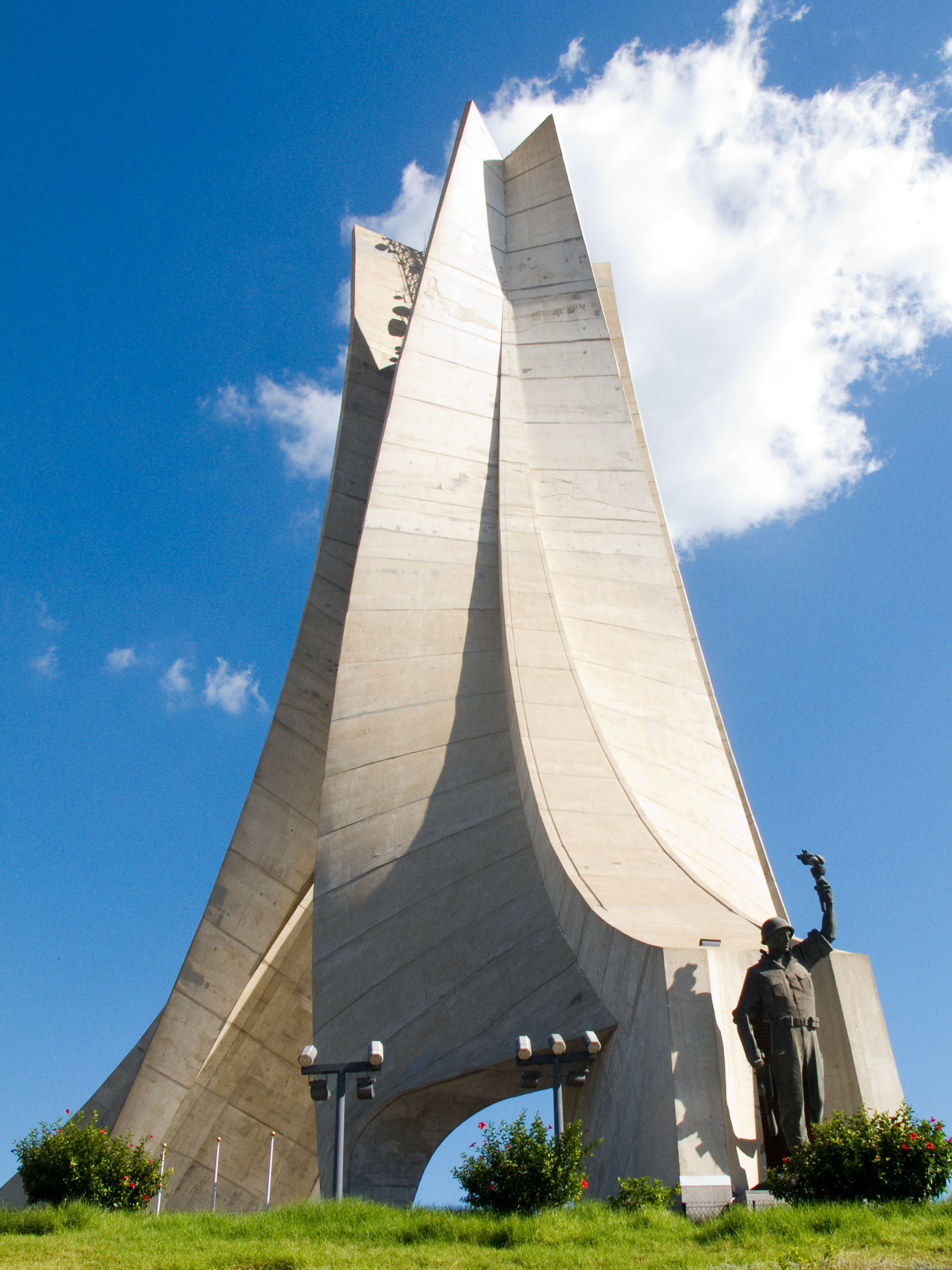

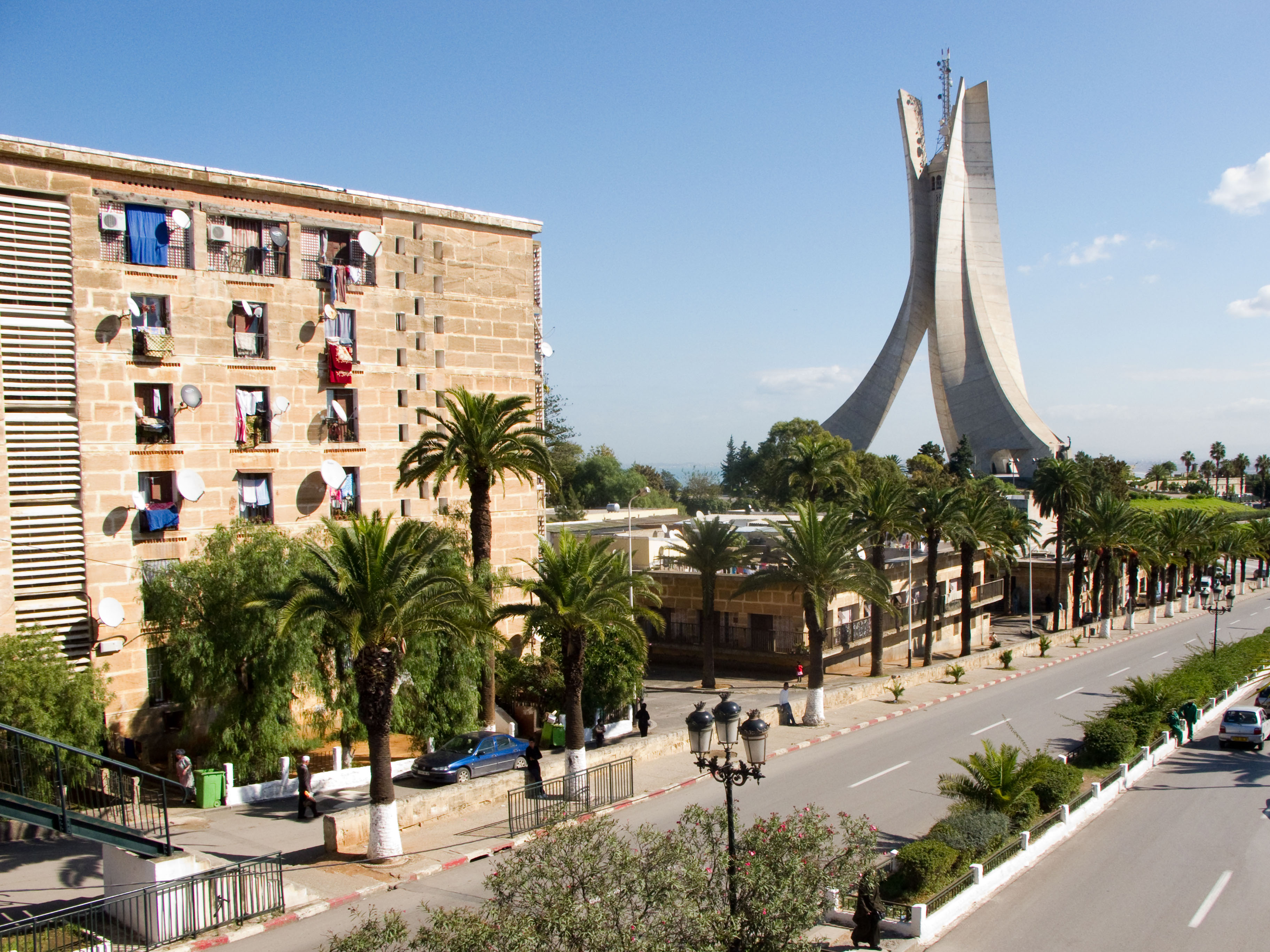

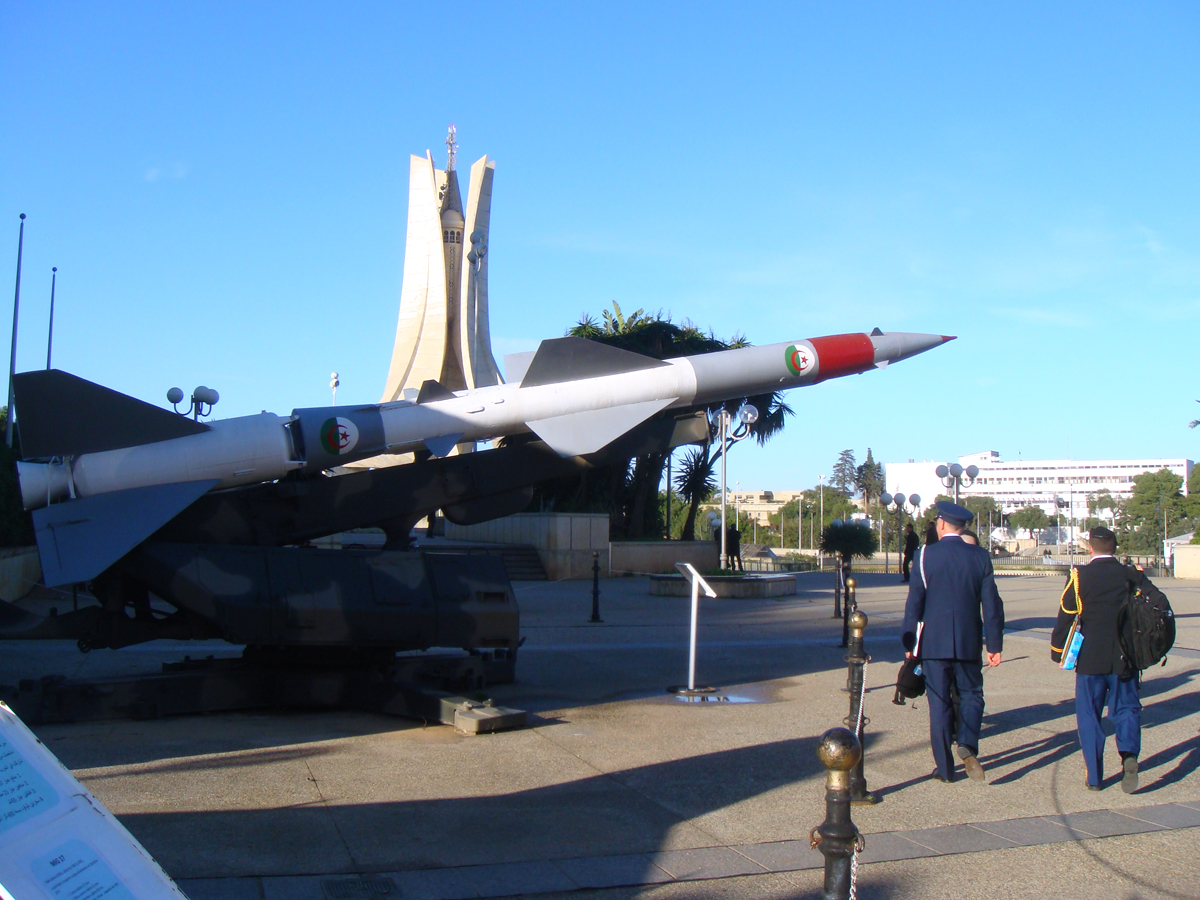

== See also ==
- Algerian War
- Azadi Tower
- Pearl square
- Memorial to the Liberation of Algeria
