= Gué de Constantine Metro Station =

Station of the Algiers Metro

Gué de Constantine
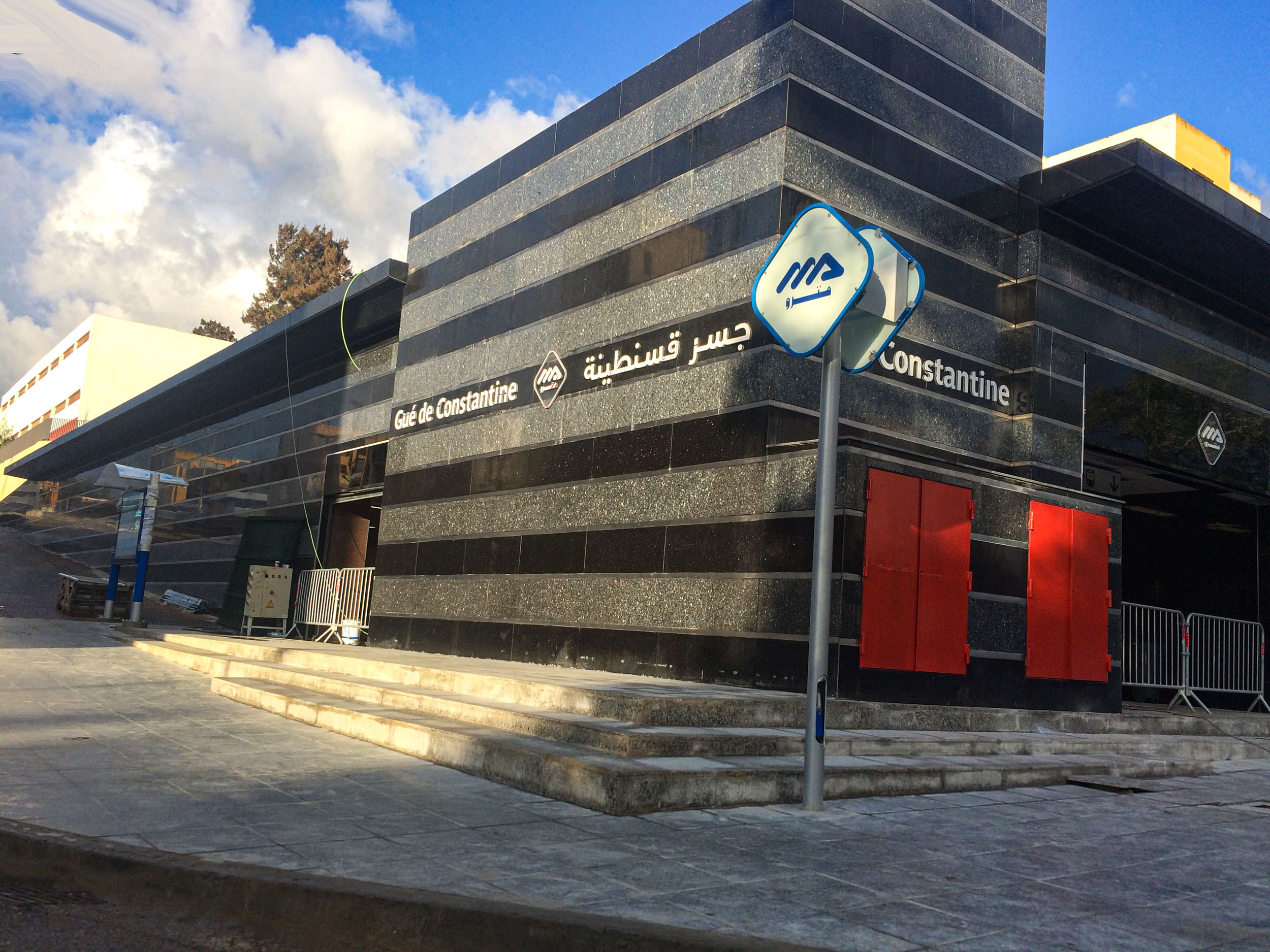

General information
- Location: Djasr Kasentina; Algeria
- Coordinates: 36°42′38″N 3°05′34″E
- Line: Line 1
- Platforms: 2 side platforms at each line
- Tracks: 2 per line
- Connections: ETUSA 79, 81, 82

Construction
- Accessible: yes

Other information
- Station code: AN1

History
- Opened: April 9, 2018 (Line 1)

Services
| Preceding station | Algiers Metro | Following station |
|---|---|---|
| Les Ateliers towards Place des Martyrs | Line 1 | Ain Naadja towards El Harrach Centre |
Location

Gué de Constantine is a transfer station serving the Line 1 of the Algiers Metro it was inaugurated on 9 April 2018 by President Abdelaziz Bouteflika.
