= Haï El Badr Station =

Station of the Algiers Metro

Haï El Badr
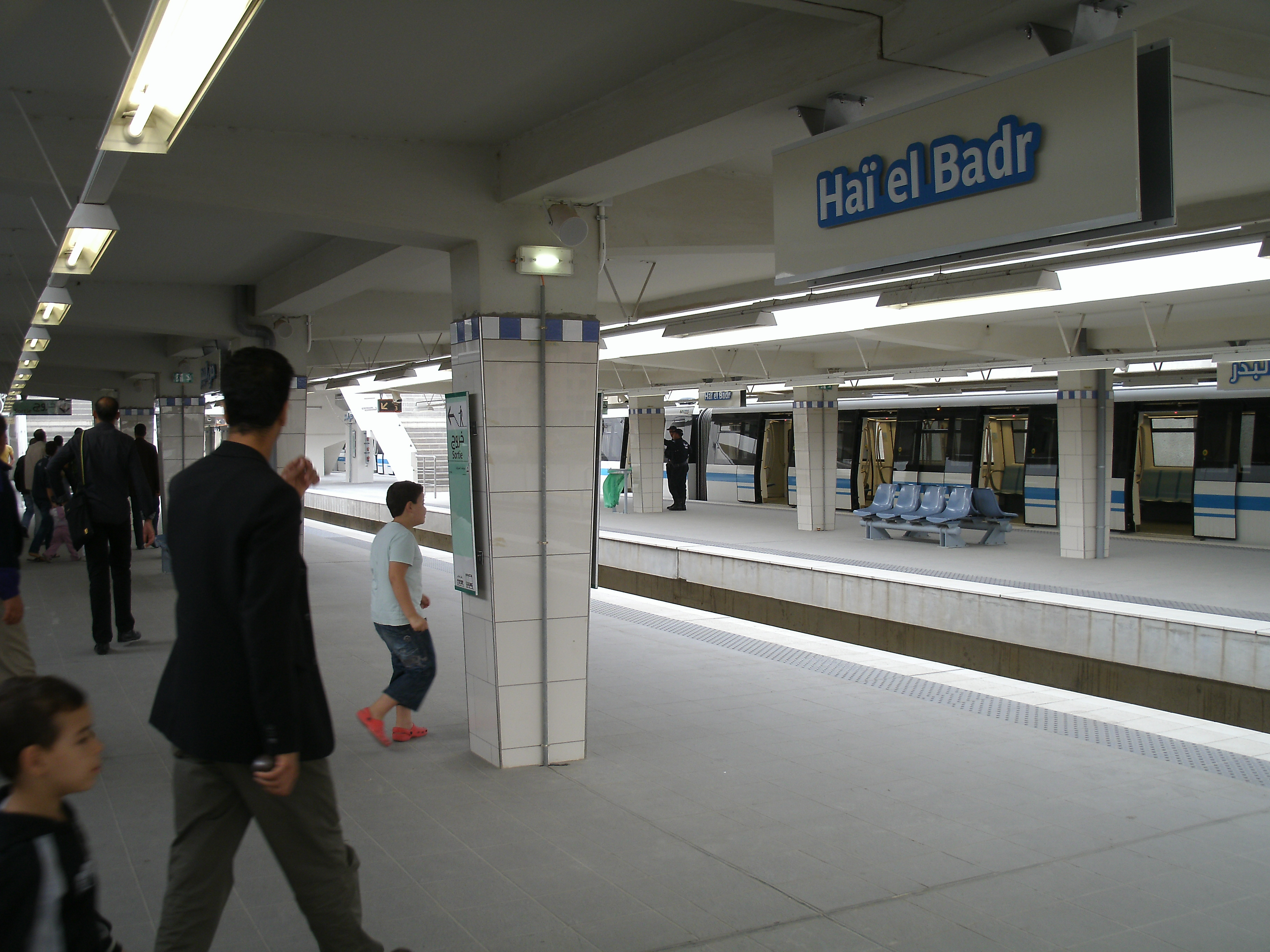
- Haï El Badr Station.

General information
- Location: El Magharia
- Coordinates: 36°43′31″N 3°06′08″E
- Line: Line 1
- Platforms: 2 side platforms at each line
- Tracks: 2 per line
- Connections: ETUSA line 18, 45, 47, 66, 67, 74, 81, 96.

Construction
- Accessible: yes

Other information
- Station code: HEB

History
- Opened: 1 November 2011 (Line 1)

Services
Preceding station	Algiers Metro	Following station
Cite Mer et Soleil towards Place des Martyrs	Line 1	Bachdjarah - Tennis towards El Harrach Centre
Location

Haï El Badr is a transfer station serving the Line 1 of the Algiers Metro.

== Etymology ==
This is one of the only two ground level

metro stations of Algiers (the other one is Les Ateliers Metro Station) and it constituted until 2015 the eastern terminus of the line. It is located in the district of the same name, Hai El Badr (ex-Allotment Michel) in the town of Kouba, although administratively the station is located in the territory of the municipality of El Magharia.

Its construction was completed in 2001, it was then composed of two docks. A third platform was built between 2009 and 2012 and equipped 2015 to accommodate the extension to El Harrach Centre.
