= Algiers Metro =

Rapid transit system in Algiers, Algeria

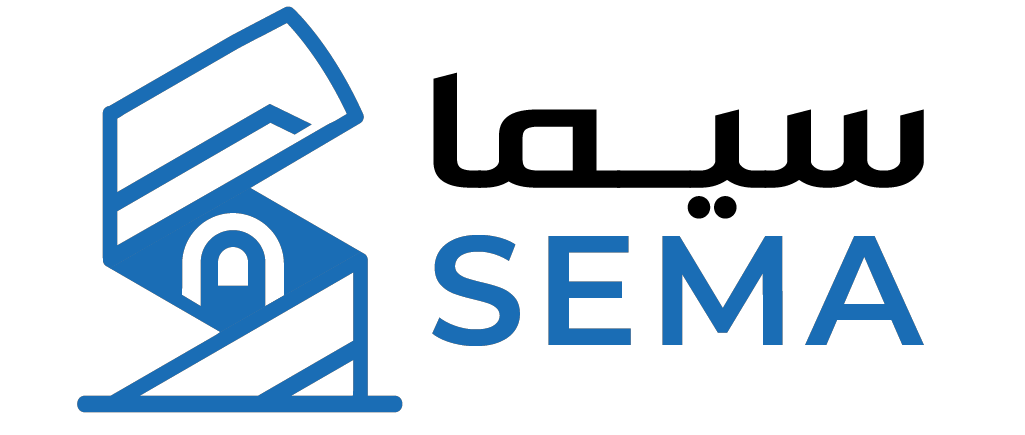

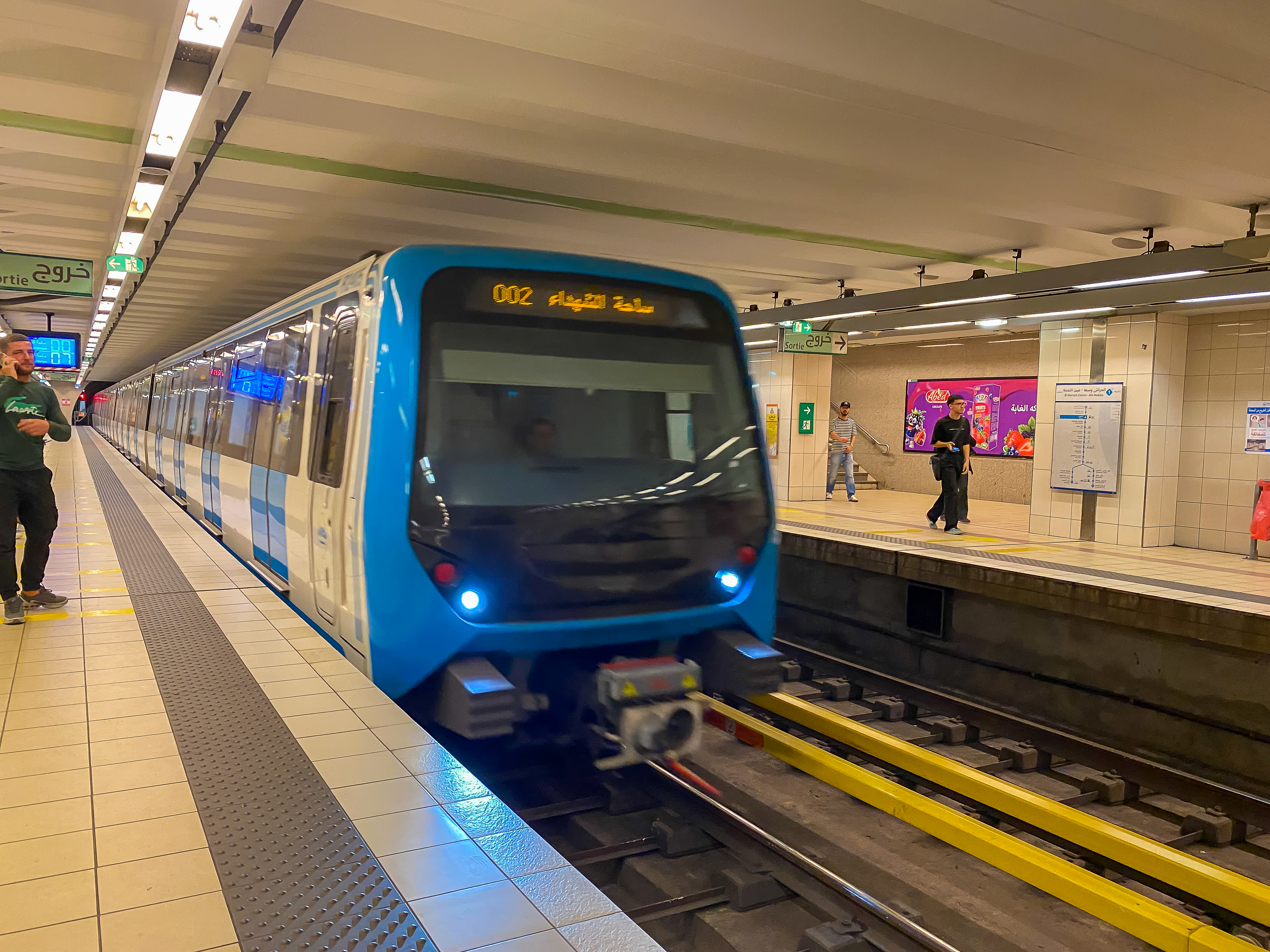
- Tafourah Station

Overview
- Native name: مترو الجزائر العاصمة; Adubrid en Dzayer
- Locale: Algiers, Algeria
- Transit type: Rapid transit
- Number of lines: 1 (2 planned)
- Number of stations: 19
- Annual ridership: 46,000,000 (2023)
- Website: www.metro-eldjazair.dz

Operation
- Began operation: 1 November 2011; 15 years ago
- Operator: SEMA (Société d'Exploitation de Métro d'Alger)

Technical
- System length: 18.5 km (11.5 mi)
- Track gauge: 1,435 mm (4 ft 8 1/2 in) standard gauge
- Electrification: 750 V DC third rail
System map

The Algiers Metro (Arabic: مترو الجزائر العاصمة; Berber languages: ⴰⵎⵉⵜⵔⵓ ⵏ ⵍⴷⵣⴰⵢⴻⵔ ⵜⴰⵎⴰⵏⴰⵖⵜ) ( Mītrū al-Jazā’ir al-‘Āṣimah ) is a rapid transit system that serves Algiers, the capital of Algeria. Originally designed in the 1970s, it opened in 2011 after decades of delays due to financial difficulties and security issues. The Algiers Metro was the second metro system to open in Africa, after the Cairo Metro.

The first phase of Line 1, "Haï el Badr"–"Tafourah-Central Post Office", which had a length of 9.2 kilometres (5.7 mi) and comprised 10 stations, opened for public service on 1 November 2011. A 4-kilometre (2.5 mi) extension from "Haï el Badr" to "El Harrach Centre" opened for commercial service on 4 July 2015 after test runs in June.

== History ==
During the 1970s, the promoters of the Algiers rapid transit subway project envisioned a 64 km (40 mi) network. The project was officially inaugurated in 1982, with technical studies completed in 1985. Authorities retained a German company and a Japanese specialist for building the network. The collapse of oil prices in the 1980s considerably affected the Algerian state's ability to continue funding the project. Authorities discussed the possibility of folding the subway development programme into other mass-transit projects but eventually decided to continue with the original Metro program, albeit slowly.

In 1988–89, Algeria awarded construction contracts to two national companies: COSIDER and GENISIDER. Neither was experienced in running large urban transit development projects. Construction encountered financial and political difficulties, with only four stations being constructed in 15 years. Moreover, the Algiers soil is difficult to dig in, and the city's topography is irregular. Work did not advance significantly for many years.

In 1994, the first 450 m (1,476 ft) long section, called Emir-Abdelkader, was completed. Another 650 m (2,133 ft) section, connecting the Central Post Office to Khélifa-Boukhalfa, was completed soon after. In 1999, the Metro of Algiers Company (EMA) invited international companies to participate in a tender offering, resulting in two new contractors being added to the project: French Systra-Sgte for project management, and Agéro-German GAAMA for construction and completion, within 38 months, of the civil engineering tasks and earthworks.

In 2003, benefiting from the return of economic stability and improved security, the government increased funding and introduced a new organisational and operational structure.

In January 2006, further changes were introduced to the project, with integrated systems development handed to Siemens Transportation Systems. This included the installation of fixed material, signals and electrification. Vinci was responsible for civil engineering, and the Spanish company Construcciones y Auxiliar de Ferrocarriles (CAF) was to deliver a new set of rolling stock, including 14 trains of 6 cars each. The network would use the Trainguard MT CBTC technology, which had already been implemented on line 1 and line 14 of the Paris Métro.

== System ==
With a length of 9.2 kilometres (5.7 mi), the first section of Line 1 to open included ten stations, connecting Tafourah–Grande Poste to Haï El Badr. Nine of the ten stations are underground with two central tracks flanked by two 115 metres (377 ft) long side platforms. Only the Haï El Badr terminus station is on the surface and it has three tracks and two island platforms.

- The El Hamma - Haï El Badr section, with its 4 stations and 17 other works for ventilation and cables was carried out within 38 months. Civil engineering work and rail laying were officially completed on 30 June 2007.
- The installation and the welding of 23 kilometres (14 mi) of tracks were started in April 2007 by the French company South-western Travaux France (TSO) with the first metro car to be delivered to Algiers by December 2007.

In July 2015, this was supplemented by the opening of the 4-kilometre (2.5 mi), four-station expansion from "Haï el Badr" to "El Harrach Centre". The system now serves 14 stations, over a total route length of approximately 13.5 kilometres (8.4 mi).

Central Control Station

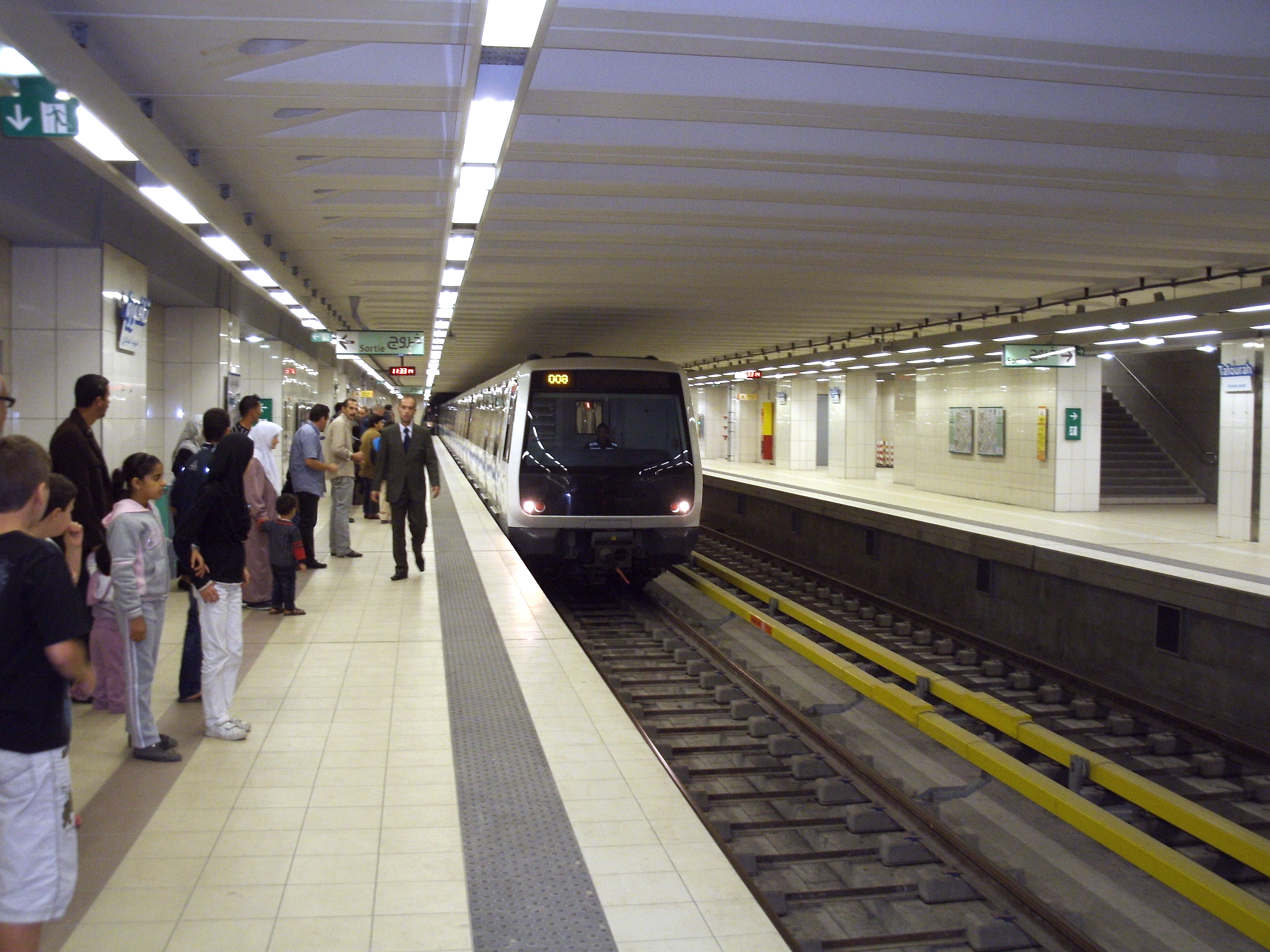
Tafourah Station ( 2011 )

=== Stations ===
Aïn Naâdja Station

Ali boumendjel Station

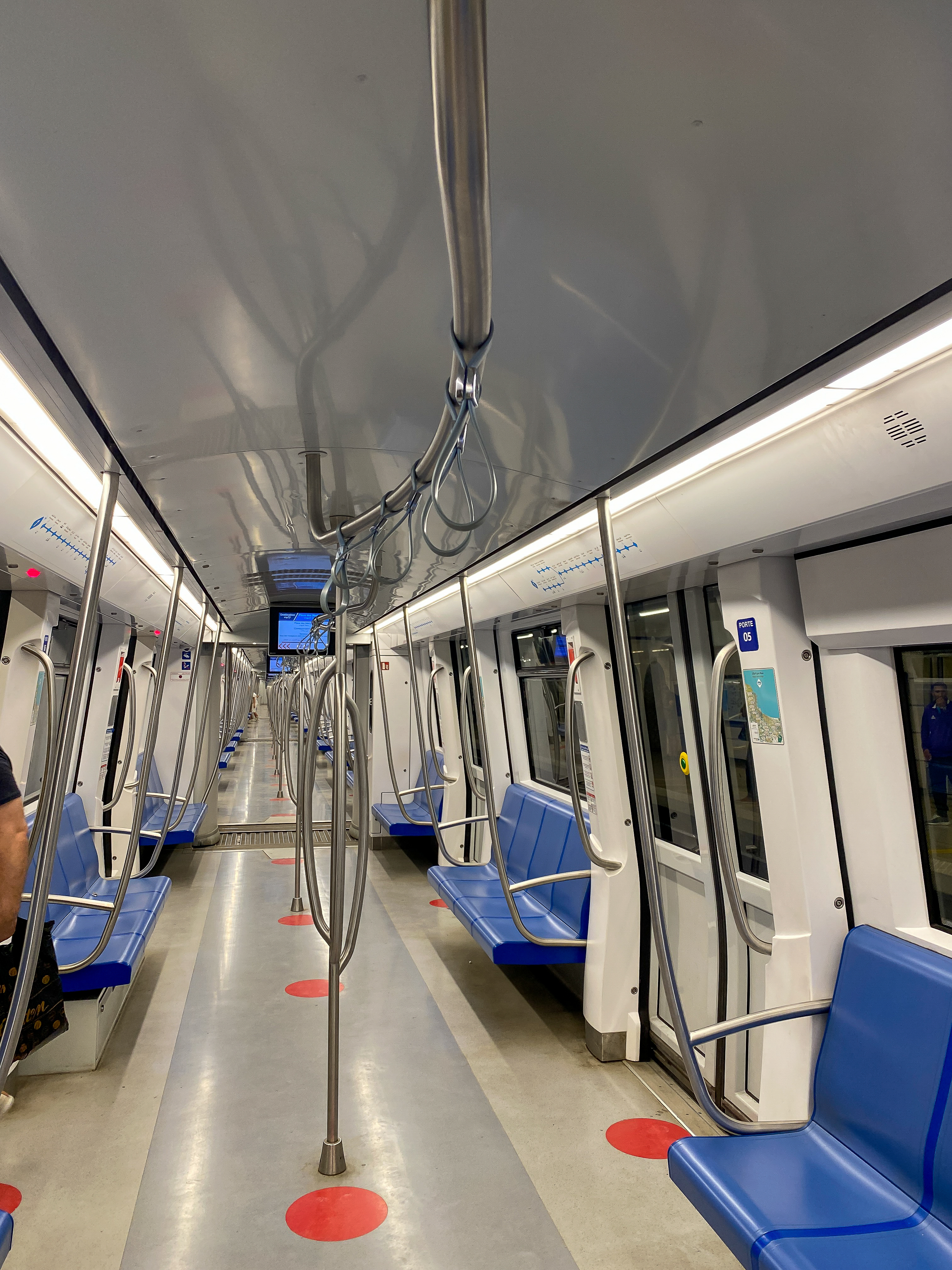
Inside the train

Name	Community	Establishment year
Place des Martyrs	Casbah of Algiers	2018
Ali Boumendjel	Alger Centre	2018
Tafourah - Grande Poste	Alger Centre	2011
Khelifa Boukhalfa	Sidi M'Hamed	2011
1er Mai	Sidi M'Hamed	2011
Aïssat Idir	Sidi M'Hamed	2011
Hamma	Belouizdad	2011
Jardin d'essai	Belouizdad	2011
Les Fusillés	Kouba	2011
Cité Amirouche	Hussein Dey	2011
Cité Mer et Soleil	Hussein Dey	2011
Haï El Badr	El Magharia	2011
El Harrach Gare	Bourouba	2015
El Harrach Centre	El Harrach	2015
Bachdjarah - Tennis	Bachdjerrah	2015
Bachdjarah	Bachdjerrah / Bourouba	2015
Les Ateliers	Bachdjerrah	2018
Gué de Constantine	Djasr Kasentina	2018
Ain Naadja	Djasr Kasentina	2018

== Operations ==
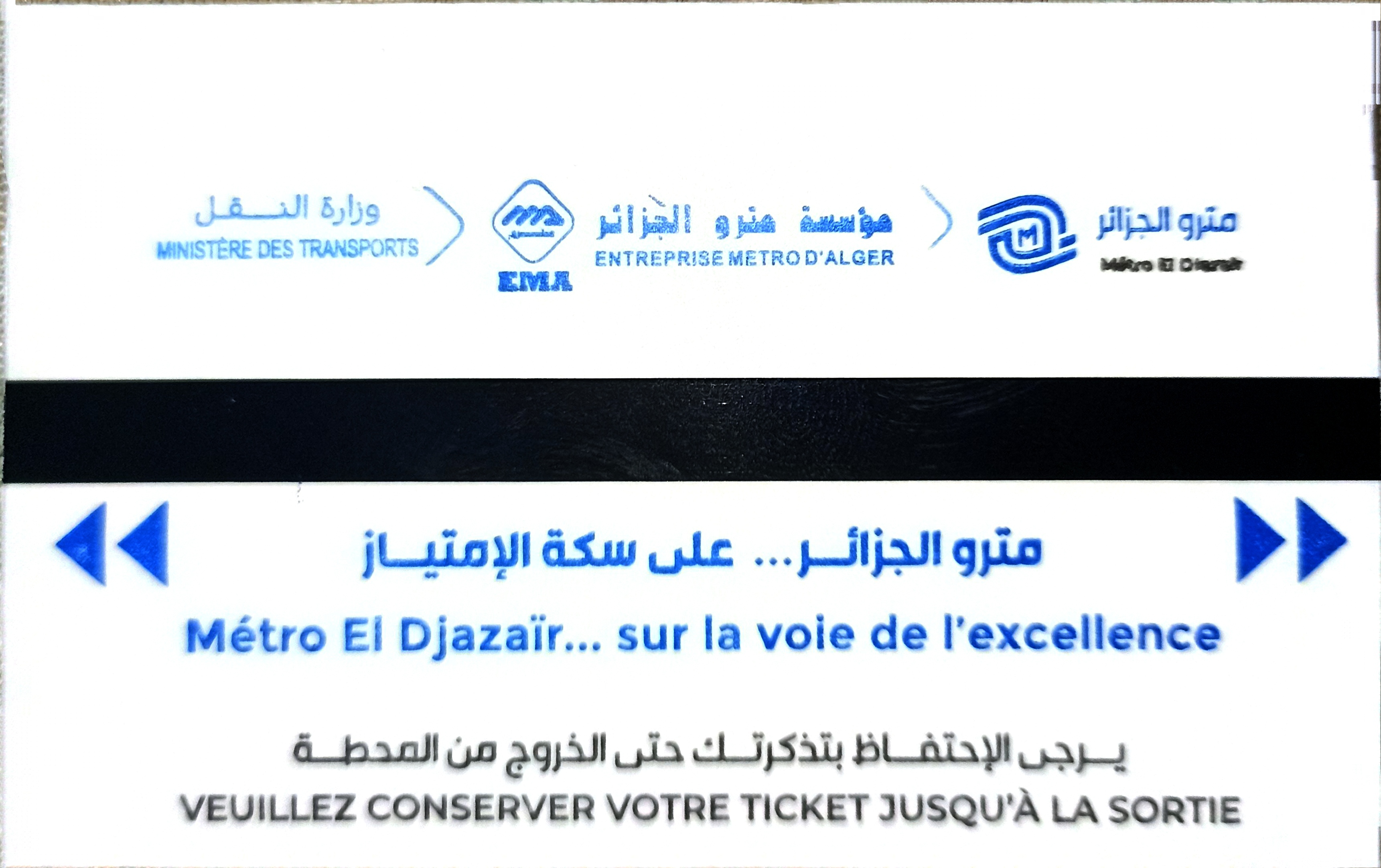
Ticket

The total cost of the first phase of line 1 rose to 77 billion DZD (900 million euros), consisting of DZD 30 billion for civil engineering and DZD 47 billion for the equipment.

- 14 six-car trains are being used. Each train is 108m in length with 208 seats and can transport 1,216 people.
- The metro line can move 41,000 passengers per hour, the equivalent of 150 million passengers per year, with a headway of under 2 minutes. Trains can travel at speeds of up to 70 km/h (43 mph), and the line is open from 5 a.m. to 11 p.m.
- The metro's daily operation is the responsibility of the RATP Group, which was awarded the contract in August 2007.

== Extensions ==
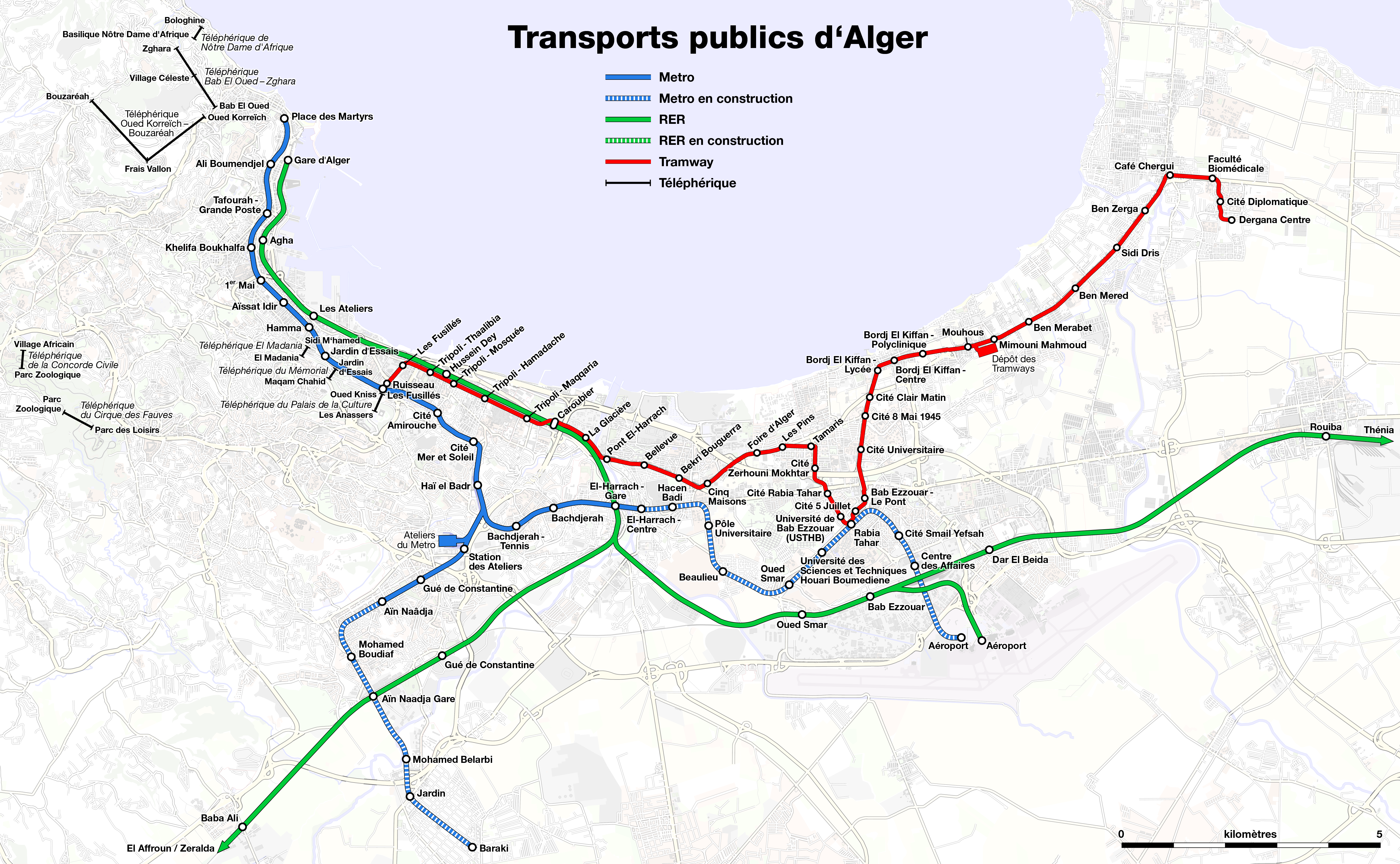
Public transport of Algiers with planned Metro extensions

Invitations to tender were launched for the construction of a 4 km (2.5 mi) section between Bachdjarrah and El Harrach composed of 4 stations and one viaduct 250 m (820 ft) long, across the access road to the Ouchaïah Wadi motorway. It opened for public service on 4 July 2015.

- The Gaama group which carried out the first section quoted 250 million euros including the construction of a multimodal station (subway/train/taxis) at the El Harrach railway station.

Two other extensions to Line 1 had a planned public opening in 2017:

- a branch line from Haï El Badr to Aïn Naâdja.
- an extension north from Tafourah Grande Poste to Place des Martyrs
- Extensions

Line 1 is undergoing 3 extension plans:

1/"El Harrach Centre" - "Aéroport International d'Alger (Houari Boumediene International Airport)", this western extension is 9.5 km long with 9 stations and will provide service to Dar El Beïda District and Houari Boumediene International Airport.

2/"Ain Naadja" - "Cité 2004 logements (2004 Housing Units Neighbourhood)", this western extension is 6 km long with 6 stations and will provide service to Baraki District.

3/"Place des Martyrs (Martyrs' Square)" - "Triolet", this eastern extension is 1.8 km long with 3 stations and will provide access to Bab El Oued Municipality.

- Planned extensions

A/Line 1:

1/"Triolet" - "Chevalley", this eastern extension is 7.5 km long with 5 stations and will provide access to Bouzaréah District (Final design study (APD) finalised).

2/"Chevalley" - "Rostomia - Complexe Olympic Mohamed Boudiaf (Mohamed Boudiaf Olympic Complex)", this extension is 1.5 km long with 1 station and will provide access to Dely Brahim Municipality (Final design study (APD) finalised).

3/"Rostomia - Complexe Olympic Mohamed Boudiaf (Mohamed Boudiaf Olympic Complex)" - "Ouled Fayet", this south-eastern extension is 8.8 km long with 8 stations and will provide access to Cheraga District (Final design study (APD) finalised).

4/"Rostomia - Complexe Olympic Mohamed Boudiaf (Mohamed Boudiaf Olympic Complex)" - "Draria", this southern extension is 5.5 km long with 7 stations and will provide access to Draria District (Final design study (APD) finalised).

5/"Aéroport International d'Alger (Houari Boumediene International Airport)" - "Pole Hammadi (Hammadi Transfer Station)", this western extension is 6.1 km long with 3 stations and will provide access to Rouiba District, a suburb of Algiers city rather than a part of the city itself.

6/"Cité 2004 logements (2004 Housing Units Neighbourhood)" - "Eucalyptus Gare (Eucalyptus Bus Station)", this western extension is 6 km long with 5 stations and will provide access to Eucalytus Municipality.

7/"Draria" - "Douira", this southern extension is 7.4 km long with 6 stations and will provide access to Douera Municipality.

8/"Ouled Fayet" - "Dzair Media City", this western extension is 3.1 km long with 2 stations and will provide access to "Dzair Media City".

B/Line 2: 1/

== See also ==
- Algeria
- Algiers Tram
- List of metro systems
- Transport in Algeria
