= Bachdjarah Station =

Station of the Algiers Metro

Bachdjarah
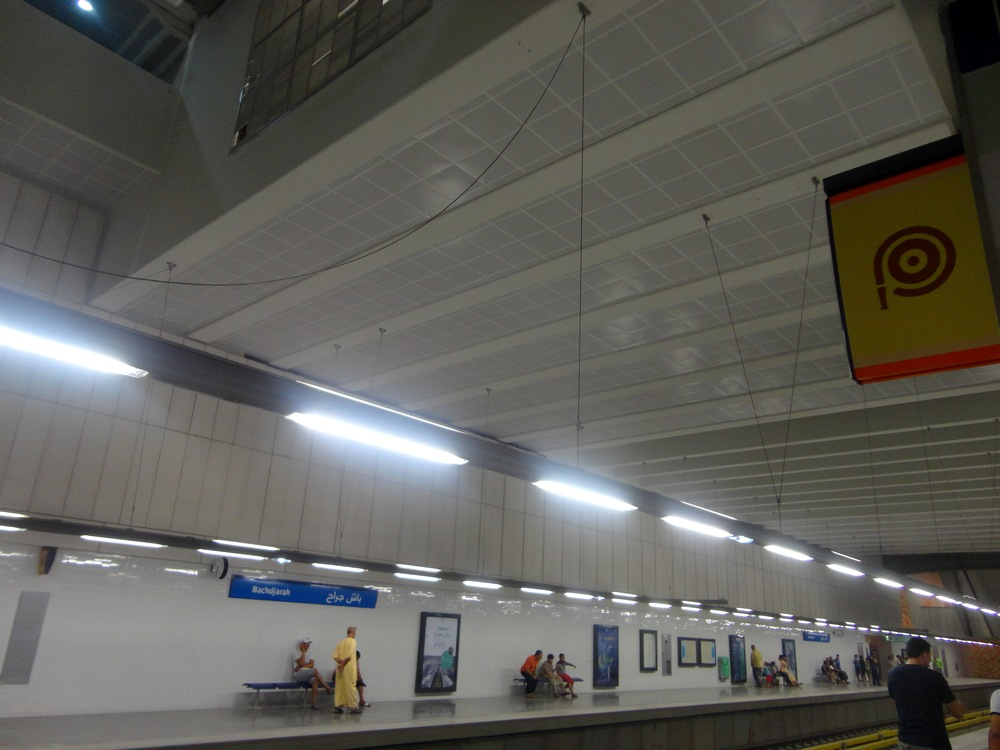

General information
- Location: Bachdjerrah / Bourouba
- Coordinates: 36°43′19″N 3°07′05″E
- Line: Line 1
- Platforms: 2 side platforms at each line
- Tracks: 2 per line
- Connections: ETUSA line 28, 66.

Construction
- Accessible: yes

History
- Opened: July 5, 2015 (Line 1)

Services
Preceding station	Algiers Metro	Following station
Bachdjarah - Tennis towards Place des Martyrs	Line 1	El Harrach Gare towards El Harrach Centre
Location

Bachdjarah is a transfer station serving the Line 1 of the Algiers Metro.

== Gallery ==
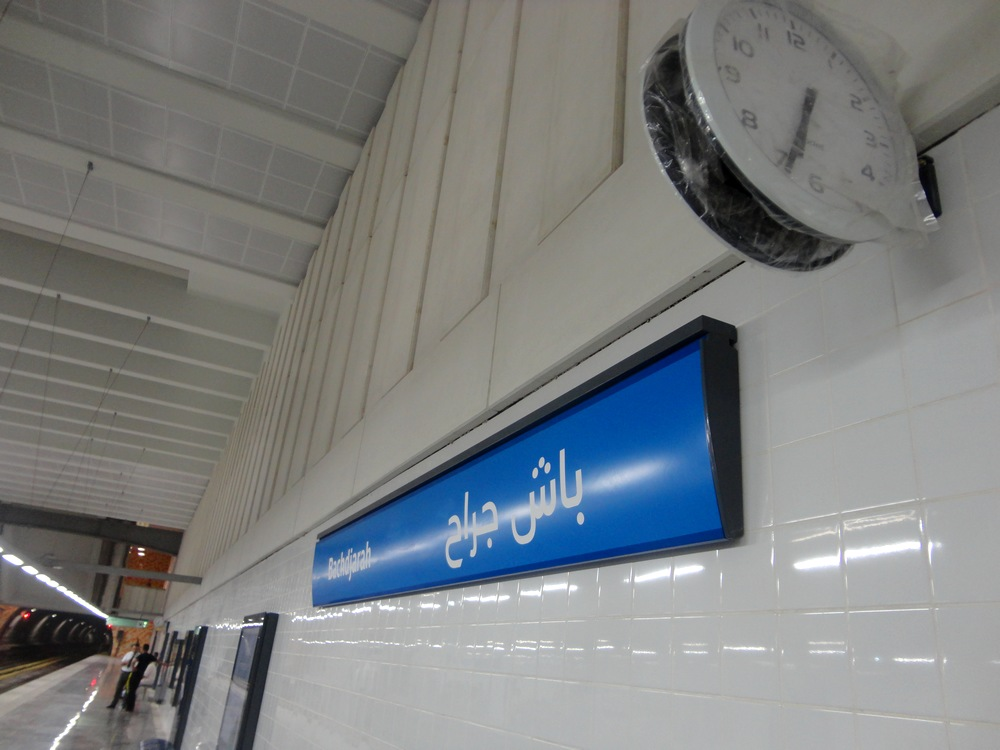
Station name.

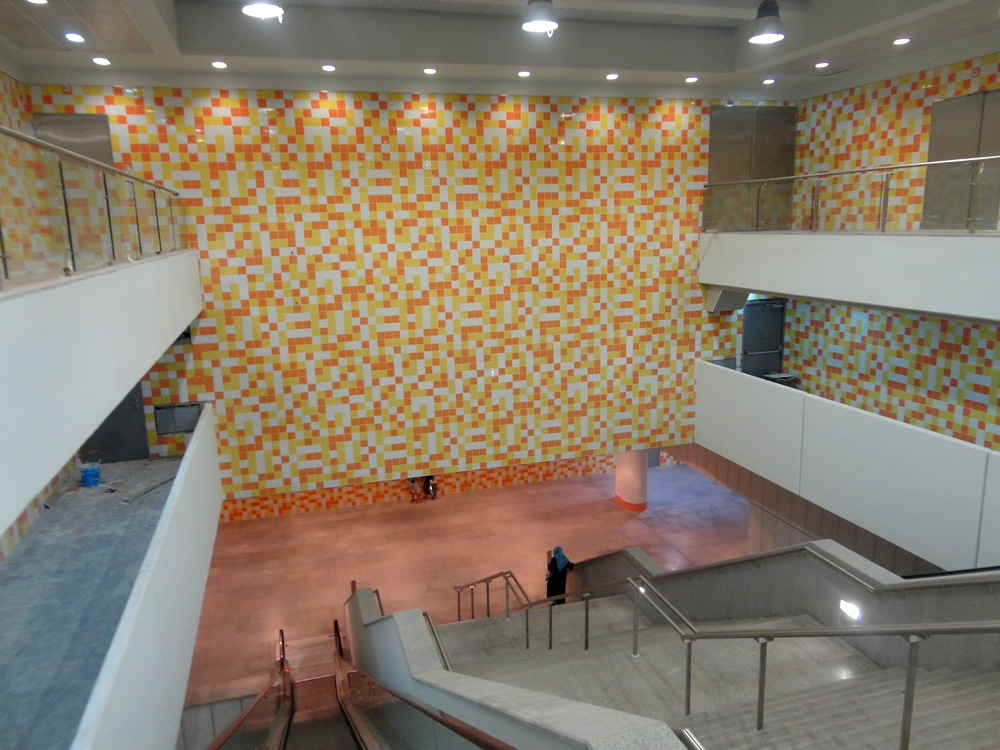
Descent to the ticket hall.

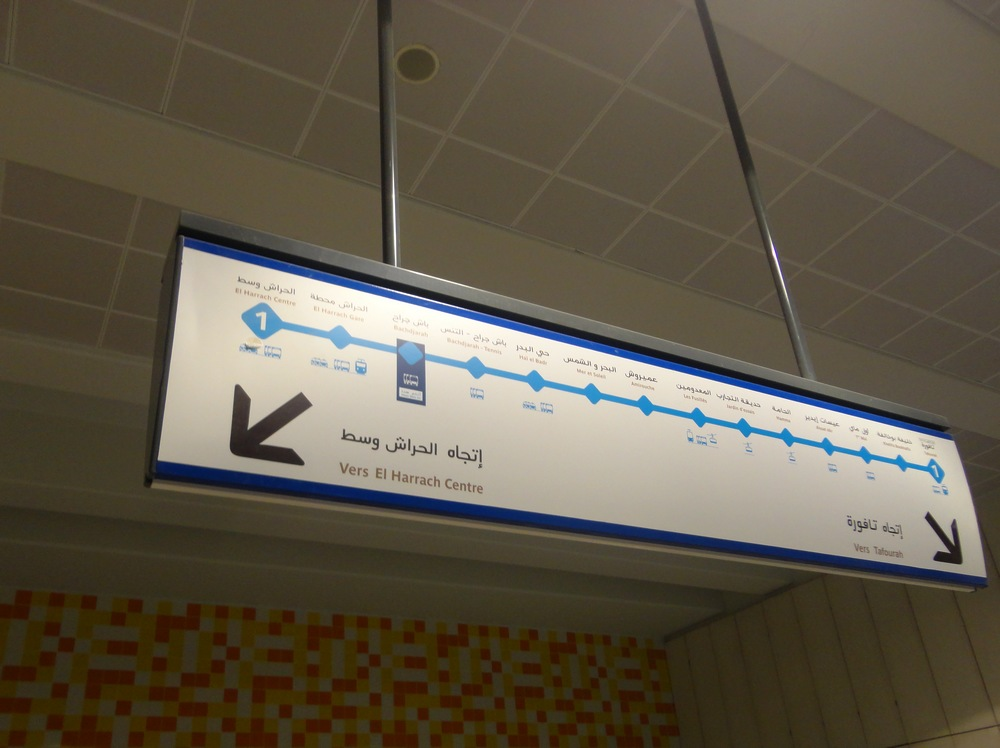
Indication of the direction of the quay.

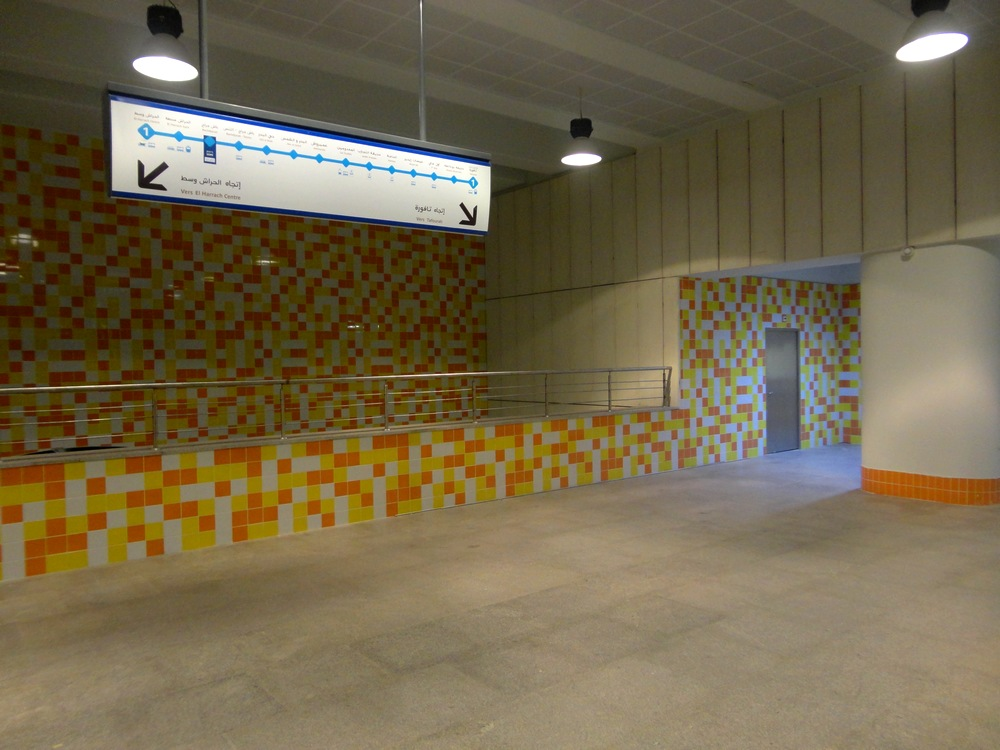
Towards the dock from the ticket hall.

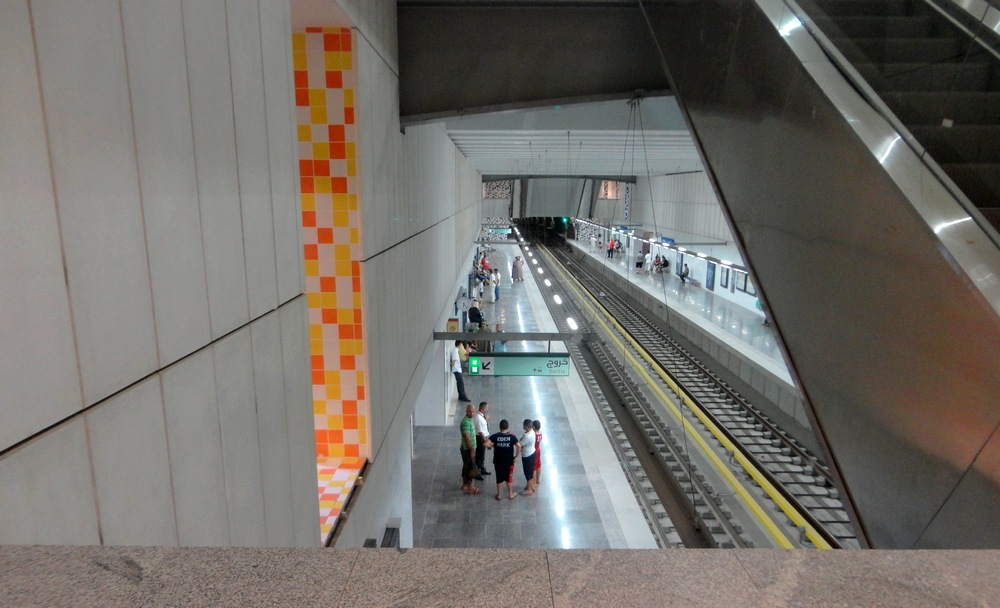
Given the dock from the mezzanine.

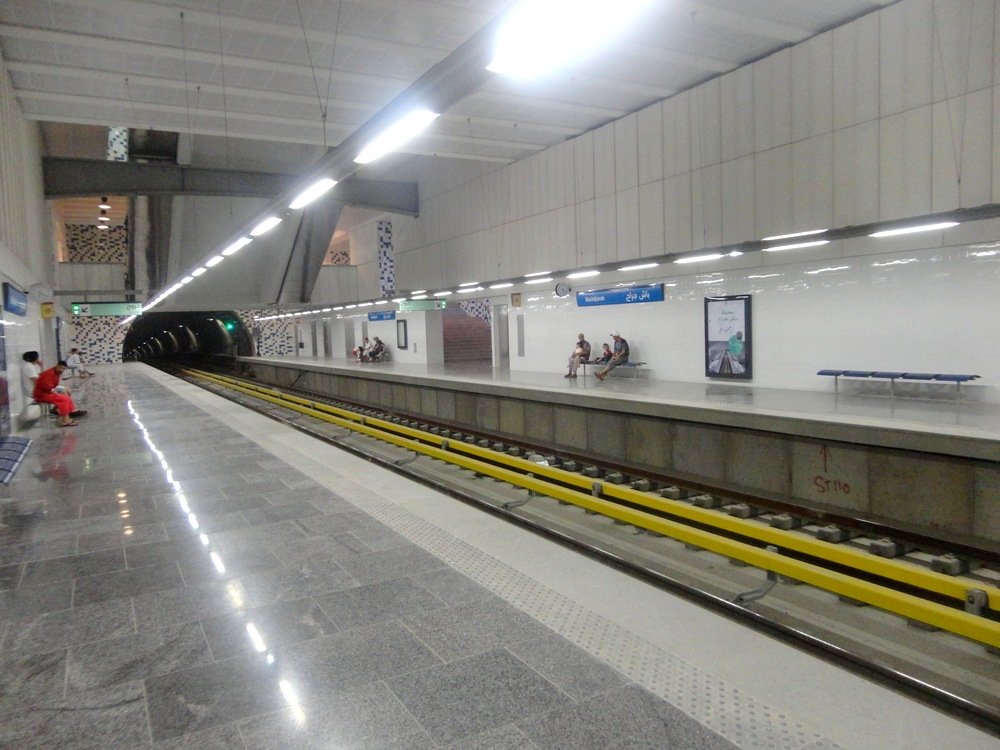
Quay of the Bachdjarah station.

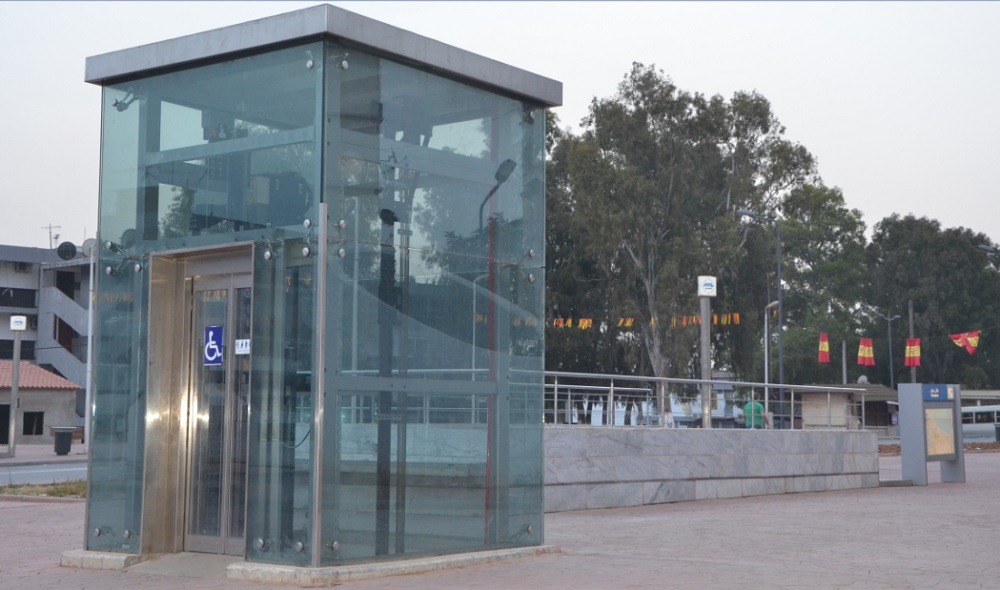
Access to the station Bachdjarah.
