= List of Algiers Metro stations =

A map of Algiers metro lines currently in operation including stations under construction

The Algiers Metro is a rapid transit system serving Algiers, the capital of Algeria. The metro has 19 stations and spanning 18.5 km (11.5 mi) and moved 28.4 million passengers in 2016.

The first phase of Line 1, "Haï El Badr"–"Tafourah-Central Post Office", which spanned 9.2 kilometres (5.7 mi) and 10 stations, opened for public service on 1 November 2011. A 4-kilometre (2.5 mi) extension from "Haï El Badr" to "El Harrach Centre" opened for commercial service on 4 July 2015 after test runs in June. the last expansion was on April 10, 2018 after test runs in January.

== Stations ==
Station name	Opened	Community	Coordinates	Station character
Place des Martyrs	April 10, 2018	Kasbah	36°47′8″N 3°03′44″E	Underground
Ali Boumendjel	November 13, 2018	Alger Centre	36°46′45″N 3°03′29″E	Underground
Tafourah - Grande Poste	November 1, 2011	Alger Centre	36°46′19″N 3°03′29″E	Underground
Khelifa Boukhalfa	November 1, 2011	Alger Centre	36°45′59″N 3°03′13″E	Underground
1er Mai	November 1, 2011	Sidi M'Hamed	36°45′38″N 3°03′19″E	Underground
Aïssat Idir	November 1, 2011	Sidi M'Hamed	36°45′24″N 3°03′31″E	Underground
Hamma	November 1, 2011	Belouizdad	36°45′11″N 3°03′59″E	Underground
Jardin d'essai	November 1, 2011	Belouizdad	36°44′49″N 3°04′20″E	Underground
Les Fusillés	November 1, 2011	Hussein Dey	36°44′32″N 3°04′59″E	Underground
Amirouche	November 1, 2011	Hussein Dey	36°44′16″N 3°05′39″E	Underground
Mer et Soleil	November 1, 2011	Hussein Dey	36°44′00″N 3°06′04″E	Underground
Haï El Badr	November 1, 2011	El Magharia	36°43′31″N 3°06′08″E	At-grade
Halte des Ateliers	September 7, 2018	Bachdjerrah	36°43′00″N 3°05′53″E	At-grade
Gué de Constantine	November 13, 2018	Djasr Kasentina	36°42′38″N 3°05′34″E	Underground
Ain Naadja	April 10, 2018	Djasr Kasentina	36°42′22″N 3°05′02″E	Underground
Bachdjarah Tennis	July 4, 2015	Bachdjerrah	36°43′06″N 3°06′38″E	Underground
Bachdjarah	July 4, 2015	Bachdjerrah / Bourouba	36°43′19″N 3°07′05″E	Underground
El Harrach Gare	July 4, 2015	Bourouba	36°43′19″N 3°07′51″E	Underground
El Harrach Centre	July 4, 2015	El Harrach	36°43′19″N 3°08′16″E	Underground

== Stations Under Construction ==
There are 15 stations currently under construction in the Algiers Metro.

Station name	Planned	Community	Coordinates	Station character
Mohamed Boudiaf	2025	Djasr Kasentina		Underground
Ain Naadja Gare	2025	Djasr Kasentina		Underground
Urban Park	2025	Djasr Kasentina		Underground
Mohamed Belarbi	2025	Baraki		Underground
Garden	2025	Baraki		Underground
City 2004	2025	Baraki		Underground
Hacen Badi	2026	El Harrach		Underground
Bouraoui University Center	2026	Oued Smar		Underground
Beaulieu	2026	Oued Smar		Underground
Oued Smar	2026	Oued Smar / Bab Ezzouar		Underground
Houari Boumediene University	2026	Bab Ezzouar		Underground
Rabia Tahar	2026	Bab Ezzouar		Underground
Smail Yefsah	2026	Bab Ezzouar		Underground
Business center	2026	Bab Ezzouar		Underground
Algiers International Airport	2026	Dar El Beïda		Underground
