= Bachdjarah - Tennis Station =

Station of the Algiers Metro

Bachdjarah - Tennis
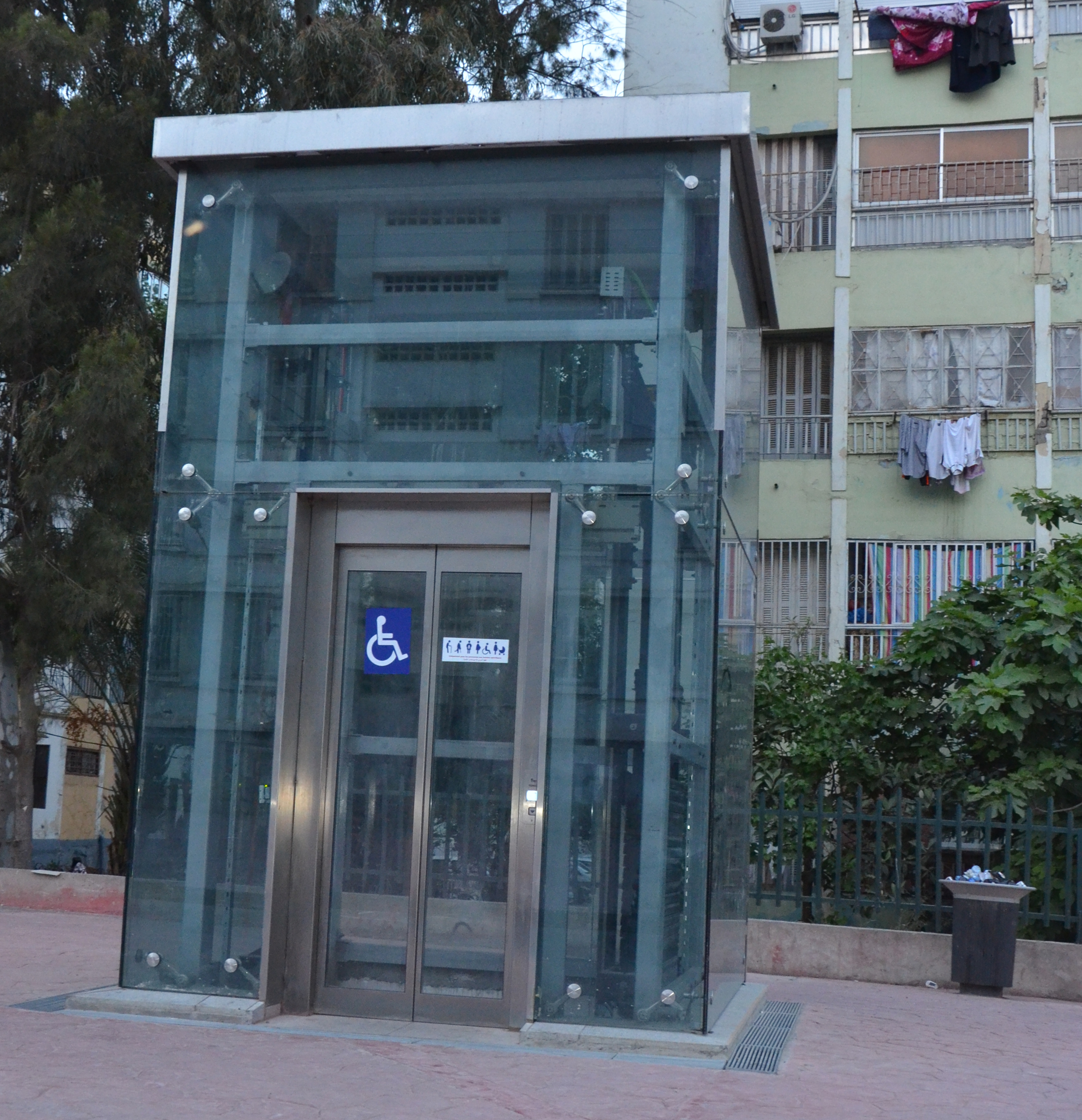
- Lift Station Algiers Metro Bachdjarah-Tennis

General information
- Location: Bachdjerrah
- Coordinates: 36°43′06″N 3°06′38″E
- Line: Line 1
- Platforms: 2 side platforms at each line
- Tracks: 2 per line
- Connections: ETUSA line 66.

Construction
- Accessible: yes

History
- Opened: July 5, 2015 (Line 1)

Services
Preceding station	Algiers Metro	Following station
Haï El Badr towards Place des Martyrs	Line 1	Bachdjarah towards El Harrach Centre
Location

Bachdjarah - Tennis is a transfer station serving the Line 1 of the Algiers Metro.

== Etymology ==
The Bachdjarah resort - Tennis is between the cities Maarifa Mohamed Lazhar (488 LGTS) and Bachdjarah 3 in the common eponym, approxilité Tennis Club Bachdjerrah.

The four outputs of the station are located on either side of the street between the two cities. One of them overlooks the large boulevard that separates the towns of Bachdjerrah and Bourouba.

It is equipped with a lift for disabled people.

During the construction of the extension line of the Algiers metro, the largest club of Algiers Tennis and nobr 16 courts, located within 200m station had been halved to dig a trench between 2009 and 2011 before being rebuilt.
