= 1er Mai Station =

Station of the Algiers Metro

1er Mai
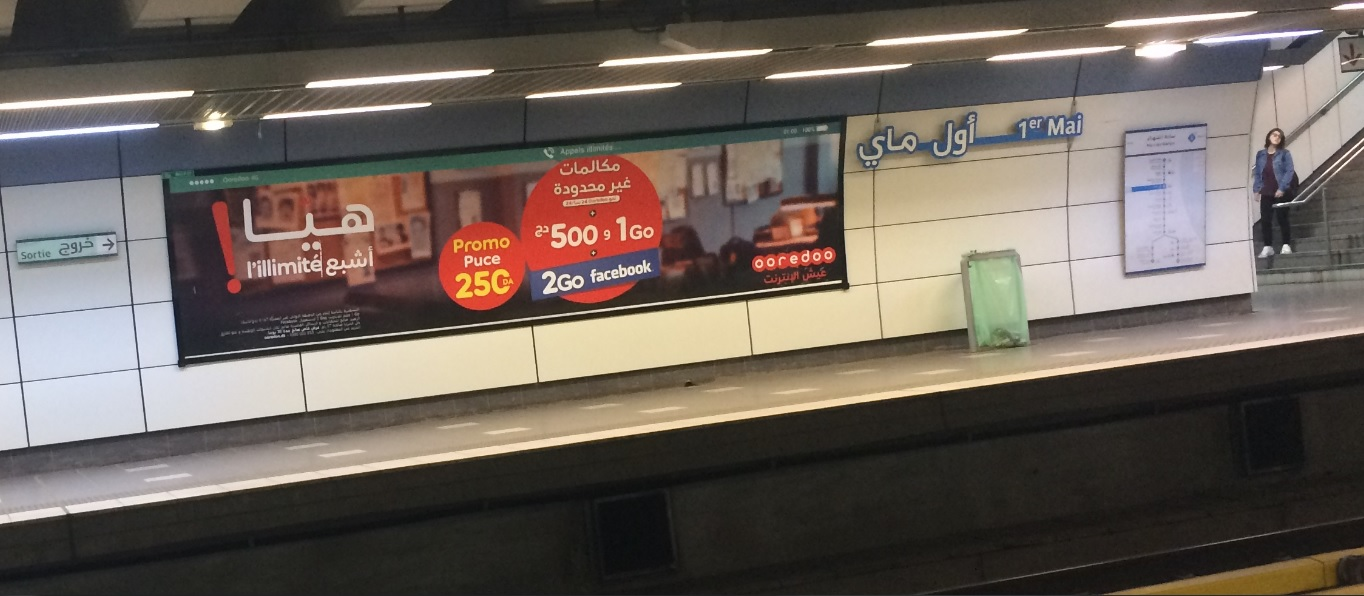

General information
- Location: Sidi M'Hamed
- Coordinates: 36°45′38″N 3°03′19″E
- Line: Line 1
- Platforms: 2 side platforms at each line
- Tracks: 2 per line
- Connections: ETUSA 07, 10, 14, 15, 16, 19, 48, 65, 79, 88, 89, 90, 99

Construction
- Accessible: yes

Other information
- Station code: MAY

History
- Opened: November 1, 2011 (Line 1)

Services
| Preceding station | Algiers Metro | Following station |
|---|---|---|
| Khelifa Boukhalfa towards Place des Martyrs | Line 1 | Aïssat Idir towards El Harrach Centre |
Location

1er Mai is a transfer station of Line 1 of the Algiers Metro, which serves Algiers, the capital of Algeria.
