= Hamma Station =

Station of the Algiers Metro

Hamma
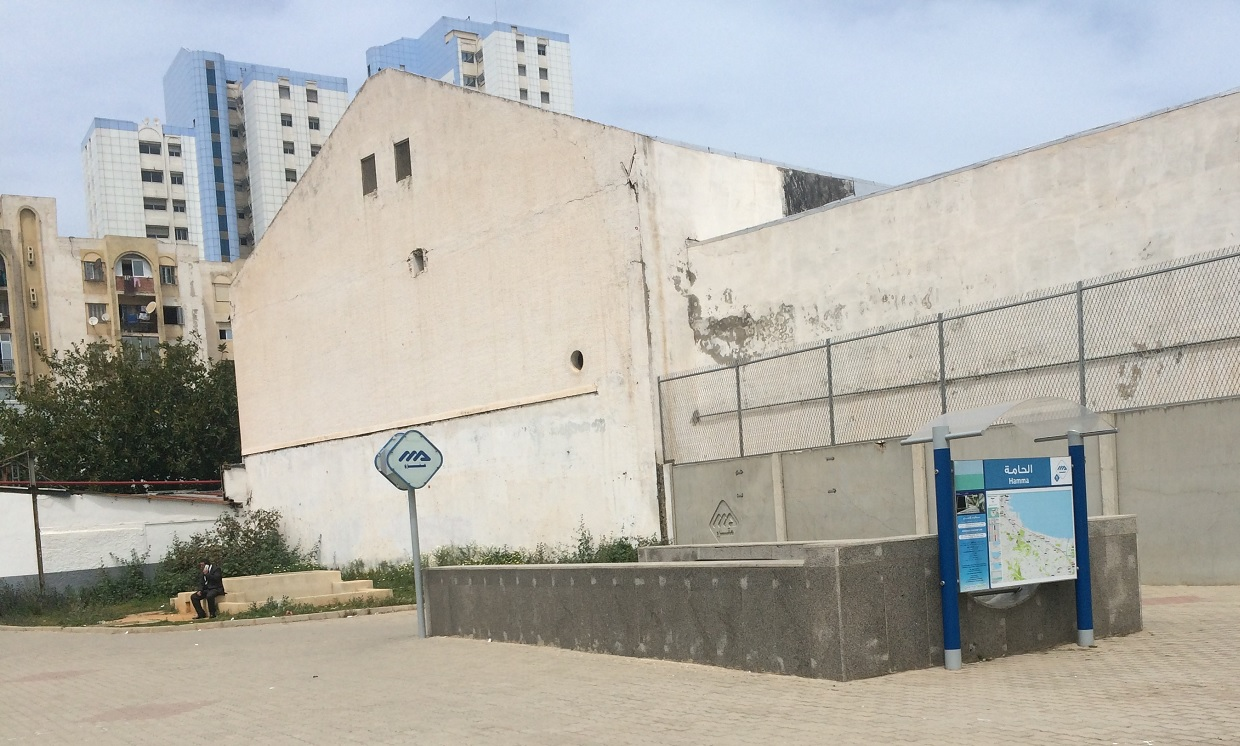
- View of the station

General information
- Location: Belouizdad
- Coordinates: 36°45′11″N 3°03′59″E
- Line: Line 1
- Platforms: 2 side platforms at each line
- Tracks: 2 per line

Construction
- Accessible: yes

Other information
- Station code: HAM

History
- Opened: November 1, 2011 (Line 1)

Services
Preceding station	Algiers Metro	Following station
Aïssat Idir towards Place des Martyrs	Line 1	Jardin d'essai towards El Harrach Centre
Location

Hamma is a transfer station serving the Line 1 of the Algiers Metro.
