= Les Fusillés Station =

Station of the Algiers Metro

Les Fusillés

General information
- Location: Hussein Dey
- Coordinates: 36°44′32″N 3°04′59″E
- Line: Line 1
- Platforms: 2 side platforms at each line
- Tracks: 2 per line
- Connections: Algiers tramway

Construction
- Accessible: yes

Other information
- Station code: UFA

History
- Opened: November 1, 2011 (Line 1)

Services
Preceding station	Algiers Metro	Following station
Jardin d'essai towards Place des Martyrs	Line 1	Cite Amirouche towards El Harrach Centre
Location

Les Fusillés is a transfer station serving the Line 1 of the Algiers Metro, and is the western terminus of the Algiers tramway.
