= Cité Mer et Soleil Station =

Station of the Algiers Metro

Cité Mer et Soleil
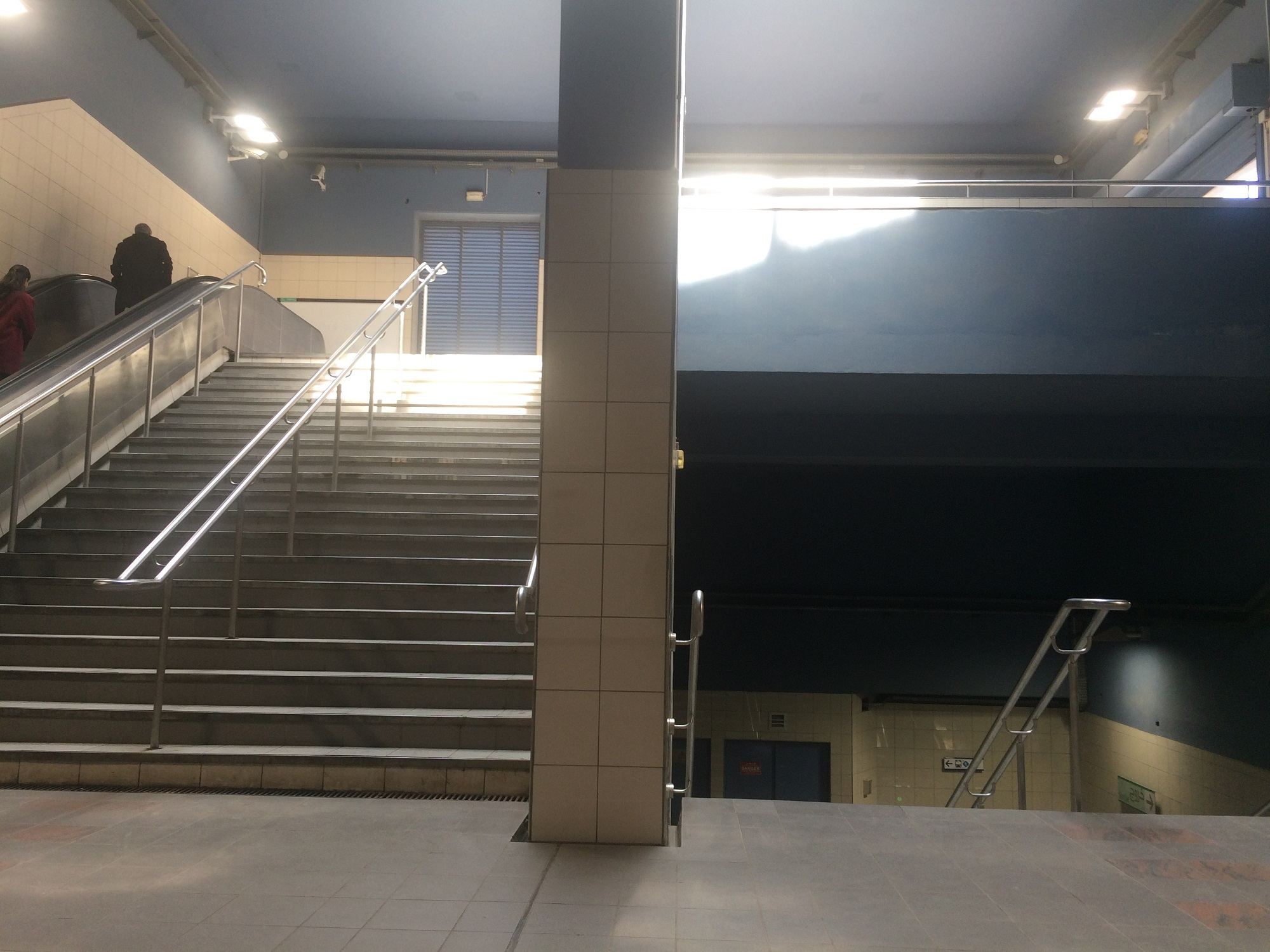

General information
- Location: Hussein Dey
- Coordinates: 36°44′00″N 3°06′04″E
- Line: Line 1
- Platforms: 2 side platforms at each line
- Tracks: 2 per line

Construction
- Accessible: yes

Other information
- Station code: CAM

History
- Opened: November 1, 2011 (Line 1)

Services
Preceding station	Algiers Metro	Following station
Cite Amirouche towards Place des Martyrs	Line 1	Hai El Badr towards El Harrach Centre
Location

Cité Mer et Soleil is a transfer station serving the Line 1 of the Algiers Metro.
