= Ain Naadja Metro Station =

Station of the Algiers Metro

Ain Naadja 2
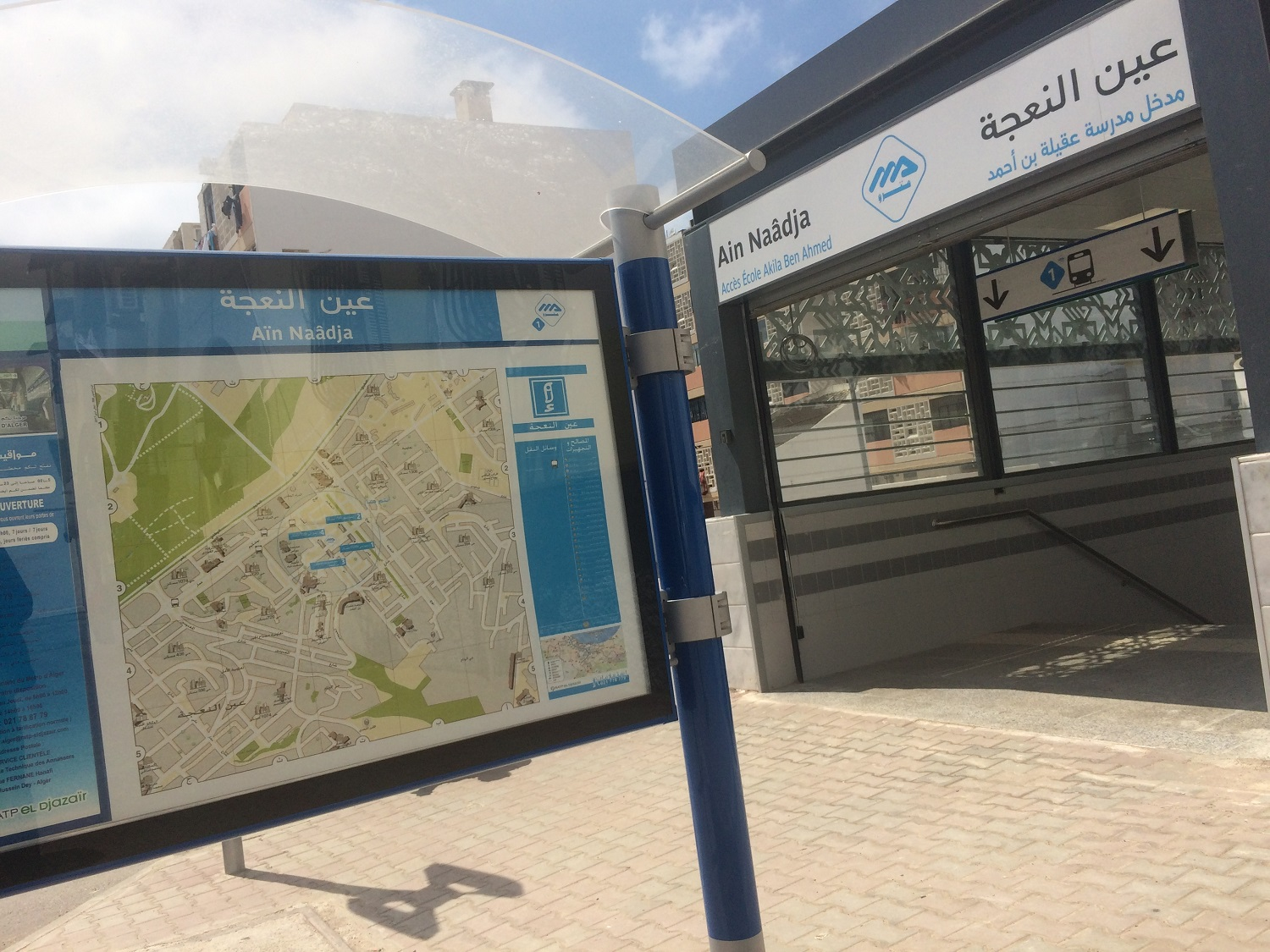

General information
- Location: Djasr Kasentina
- Coordinates: 36°42′22″N 3°05′02″E
- Line: Line 1
- Platforms: 2 side platforms at each line
- Tracks: 2 per line
- Connections: ETUSA 79, 81, 82

Construction
- Accessible: yes

Other information
- Station code: AN2

History
- Opened: April 9, 2018 (Line 1)

Services
Preceding station	Algiers Metro	Following station
Gué de Constantine towards Place des Martyrs	Line 1	Terminus
Location

Ain Naadja is a transfer station serving the Line 1 of the Algiers Metro, it was inaugurated on 9 April 2018 by President Abdelaziz Bouteflika.
