= Les Ateliers Metro Station =

Station of the Algiers Metro

Les Ateliers
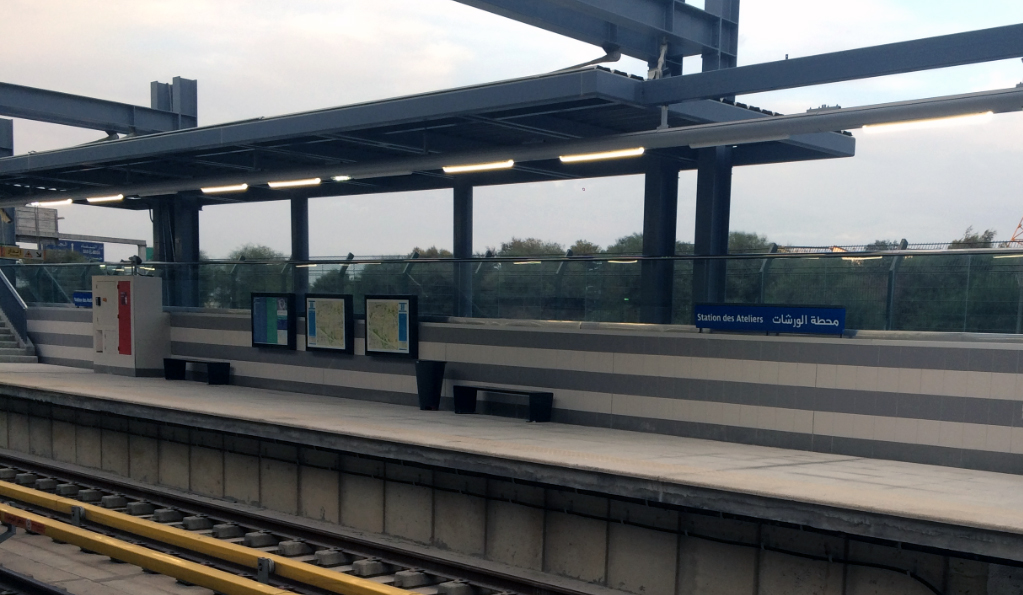

General information
- Location: Bachdjerrah
- Coordinates: 36°43′00″N 3°05′53″E
- Line: Line 2
- Platforms: 2 side platforms at each line
- Tracks: 2 per line
- Connections: ETUSA

Construction
- Accessible: yes

Other information
- Station code: LAT

History
- Opened: April 9, 2018 (Line 1)

Services
Preceding station	Algiers Metro	Following station
Haï El Badr towards Place des Martyrs	Line 1	Haï El Badr towards El Harrach Centre
Location

Les Ateliers is a transfer station serving the Line 1 of the Algiers Metro it was inaugurated on 9 April 2018 by President Abdelaziz Bouteflika.
