= Ali Boumendjel Metro Station =

Station of the Algiers Metro

Ali Boumendjel
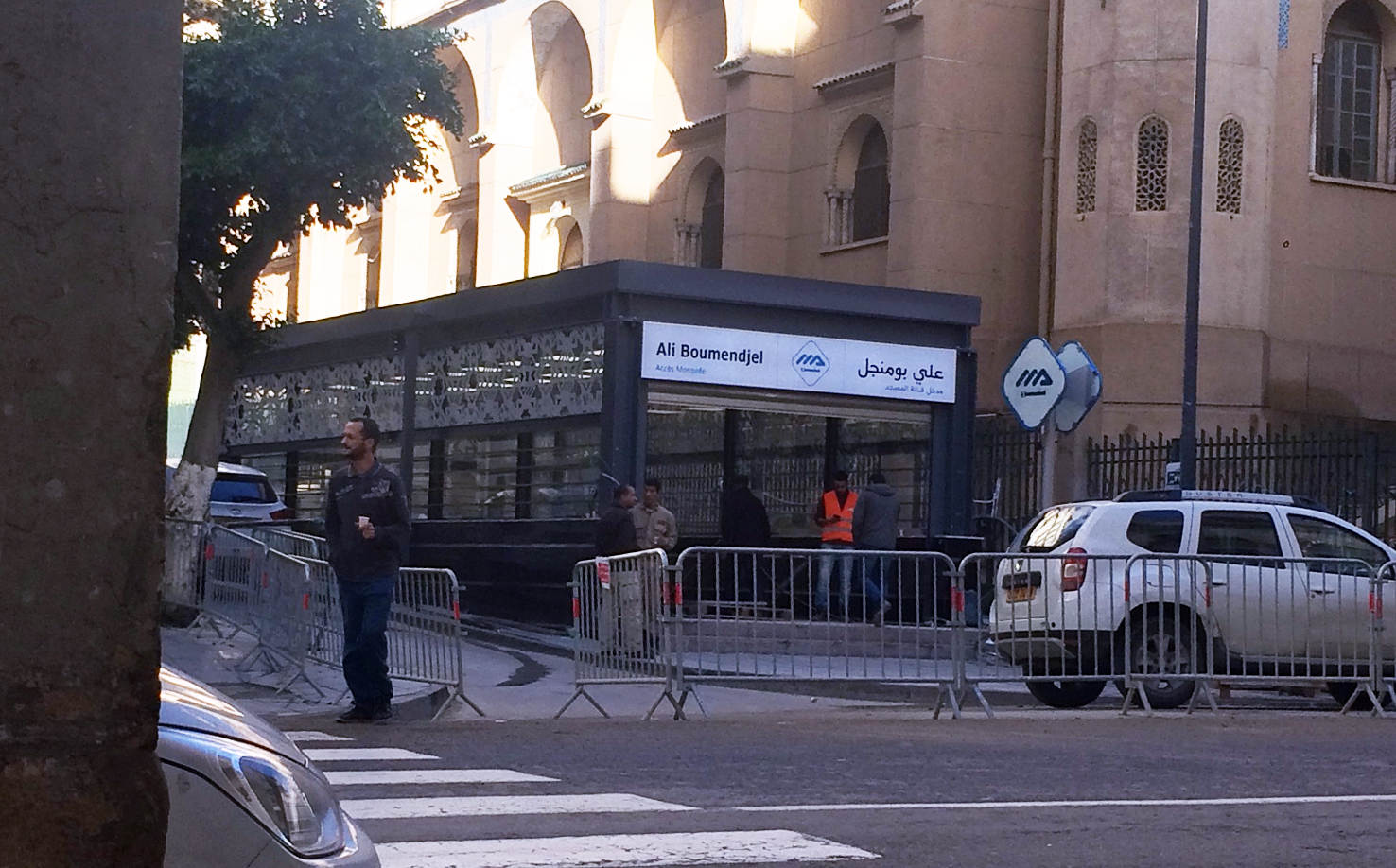

General information
- Location: Alger Centre
- Coordinates: 36°46′45″N 3°03′29″E
- Line: Line 1
- Platforms: 2 side platforms at each line
- Tracks: 2 per line
- Connections: ETUSA

Construction
- Accessible: yes

Other information
- Station code: ALB

History
- Opened: April 9, 2018 (Line 1)

Services
Preceding station	Algiers Metro	Following station
Place des Martyrs Terminus	Line 1	Tafourah - Grande Poste towards El Harrach Centre
Location

Ali Boumendjel is a transfer station serving the Line 1 of the Algiers Metro. It was inaugurated in November 2018.
