= El Magharia =

Coordinates: 36°43′N 3°06′E

El Magharia بلدية المقارية
- Interactive map of El Magharia
- Country: Algeria
- Province: Algiers
- Time zone: UTC+1 (West Africa Time)

El Magharia (Arabic: بلدية المقارية) is a suburb of the city of Algiers in northern Algeria.
