= Djasr Kasentina =

Gué de Constantine جسر قسنطينة

- Location within Algeria
- Coordinates: 36°41′49″N 3°05′43″E
- Country: Algeria
- Province: Algiers
- Daïra: Bir Mourad Raïs

Area
  - Total: 14 km^{2} (5.4 sq mi)
- Elevation: 60 m (200 ft)

Population (2020)
  - Total: 194,000
- Time zone: UTC+1 (West Africa Time)
- Postal code: 16048

Gué de Constantine (Arabic: جسر قسنطينة, romanized: Jisr Qusanṭīnah) is a suburb of the city of Algiers in northern Algeria. It has a population of 194,000 as of 2020. It sits at an altitude of 60 metres.
