= Bachdjerrah =

Coordinates: 36°43′18″N 3°07′06″E

Bachdjarah باش جراح
- Commune
- Interactive map of Bachdjarah
- Country: Algeria
- Province: Algiers

Area
  - Land: 3.32 km^{2} (1.28 sq mi)

Population (2008)
  - Total: 93,289
  - Density: 28,099.1/km^{2} (72,776/sq mi)
- Time zone: UTC+1 (West Africa Time)

Bachdjarah (Arabic: باش جراح) is a commune in Algiers Province and a suburb of the city of Algiers in northern Algeria. As of the 2008 census, the commune had a population of 93,289.

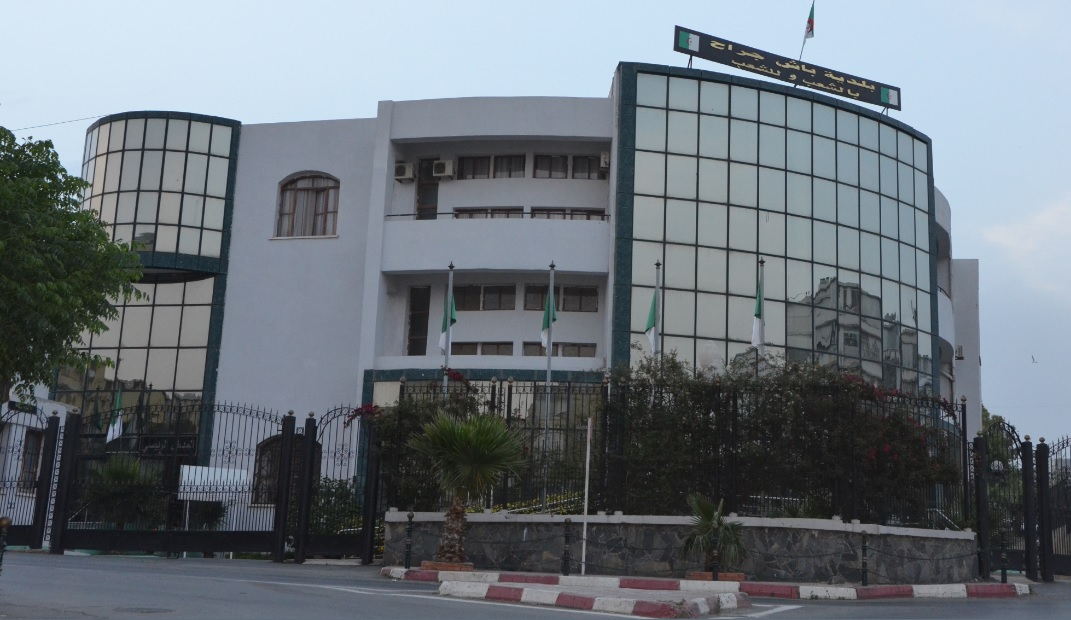
Bachdjarah
