= El Harrach Centre Station =

Station of the Algiers Metro

El Harrach Centre
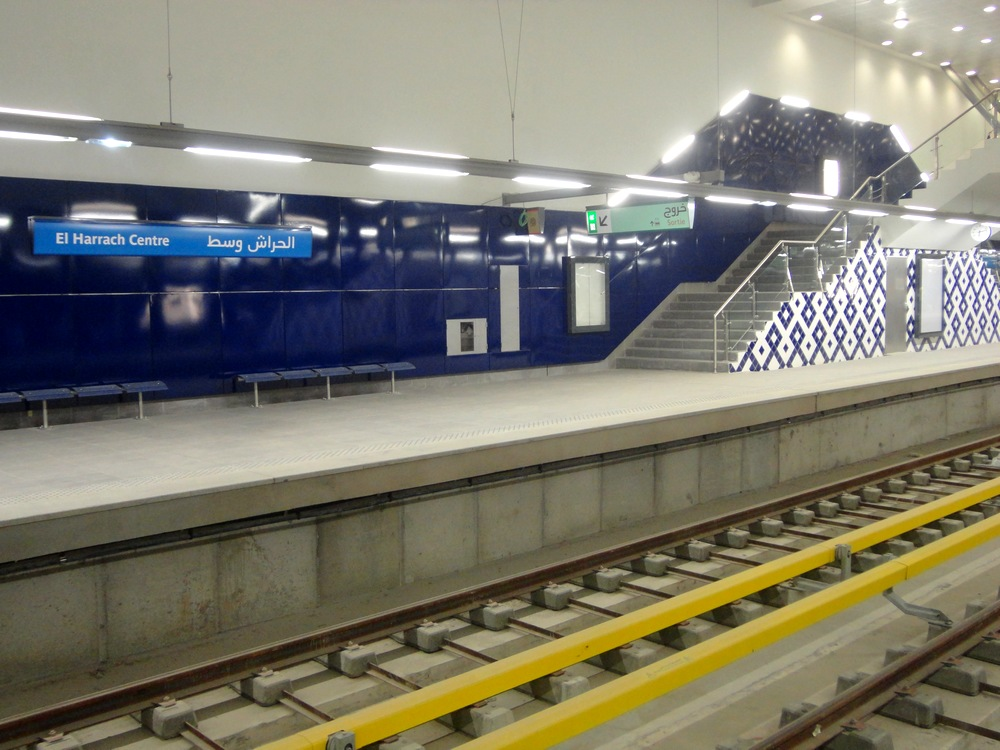
- El Harrach Centre Station

General information
- Location: El Harrach
- Coordinates: 36°43′19″N 3°08′16″E
- Line: Line 1
- Platforms: 2 side platforms at each line
- Tracks: 2 per line
- Connections: ETUSA line 1, 5, 28.

Construction
- Accessible: yes

History
- Opened: July 5, 2015 (Line 1)

Services
Preceding station	Algiers Metro	Following station
El Harrach Gare towards Place des Martyrs	Line 1	Terminus
Location

El Harrach Centre is a transfer station serving Line 1 of the Algiers Metro.

== Gallery ==
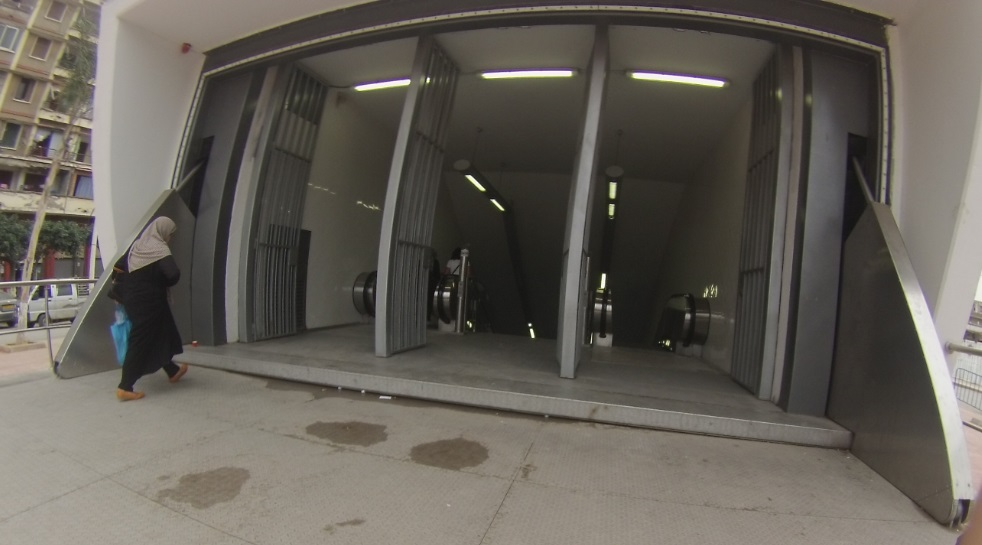
One of the entrances to the station

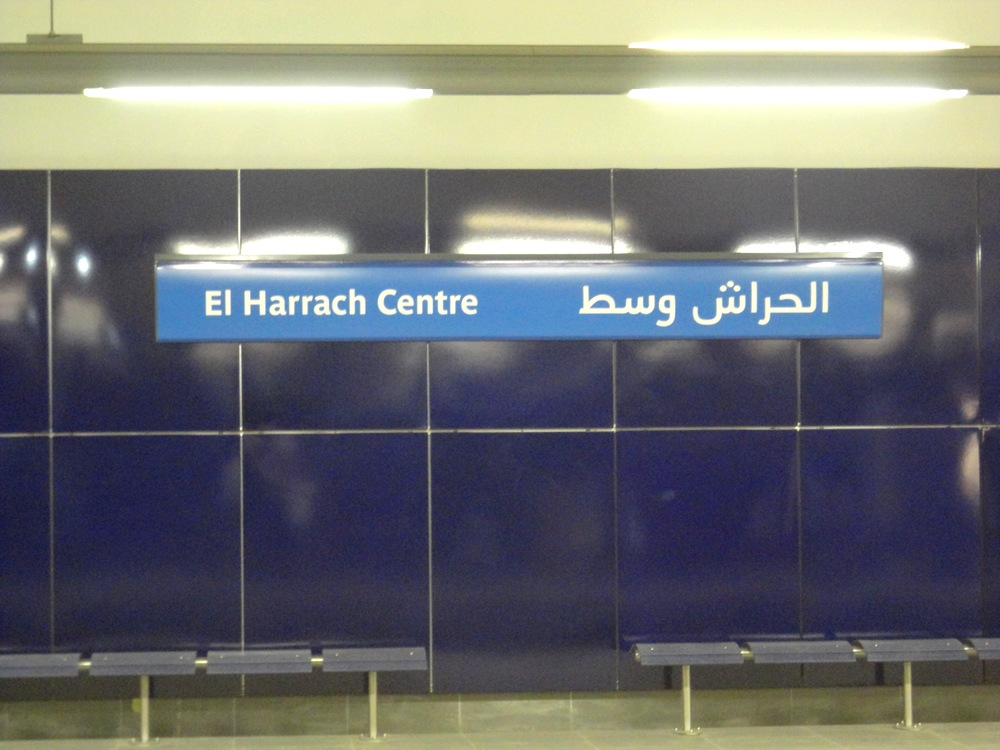
Display of station name.

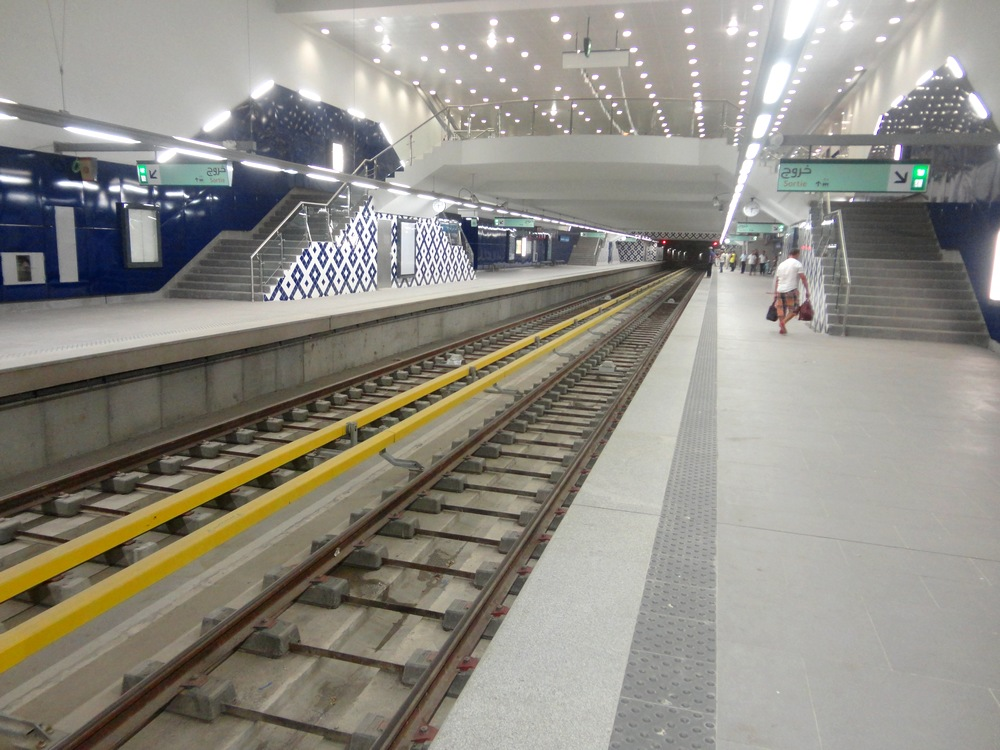
The dock station.

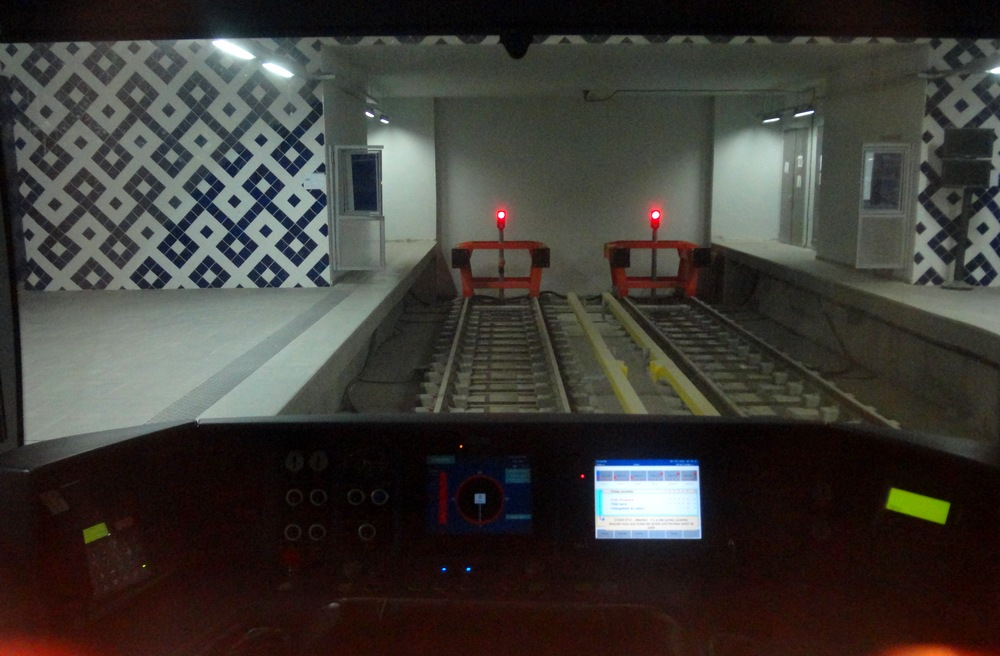
End of the current line.

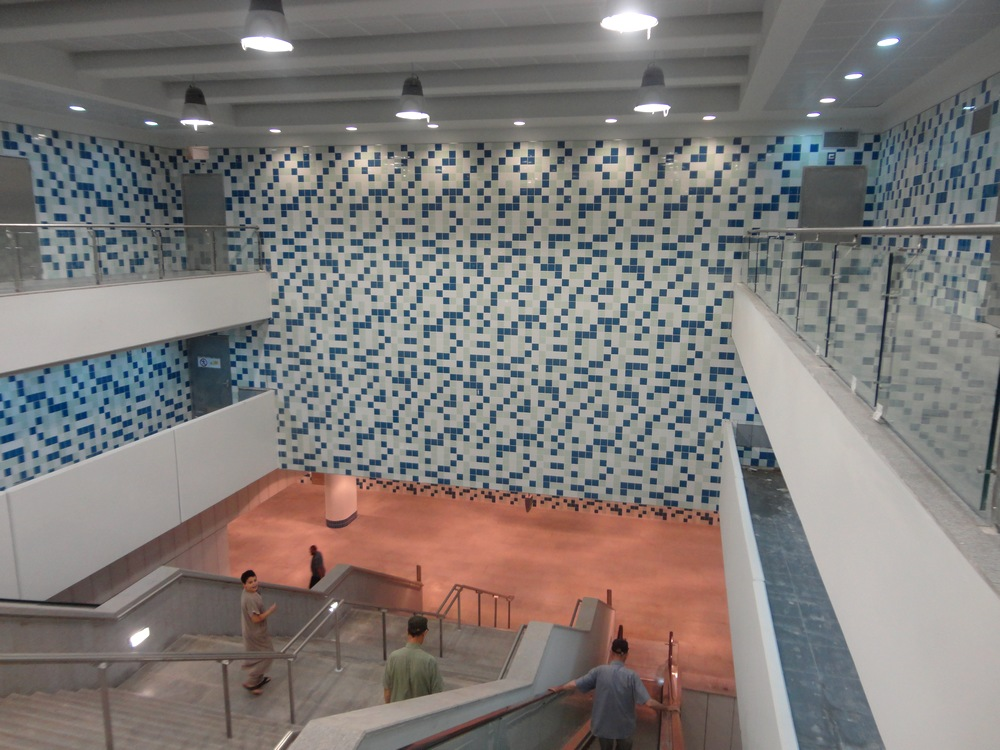
Descent to the ticketing hall.

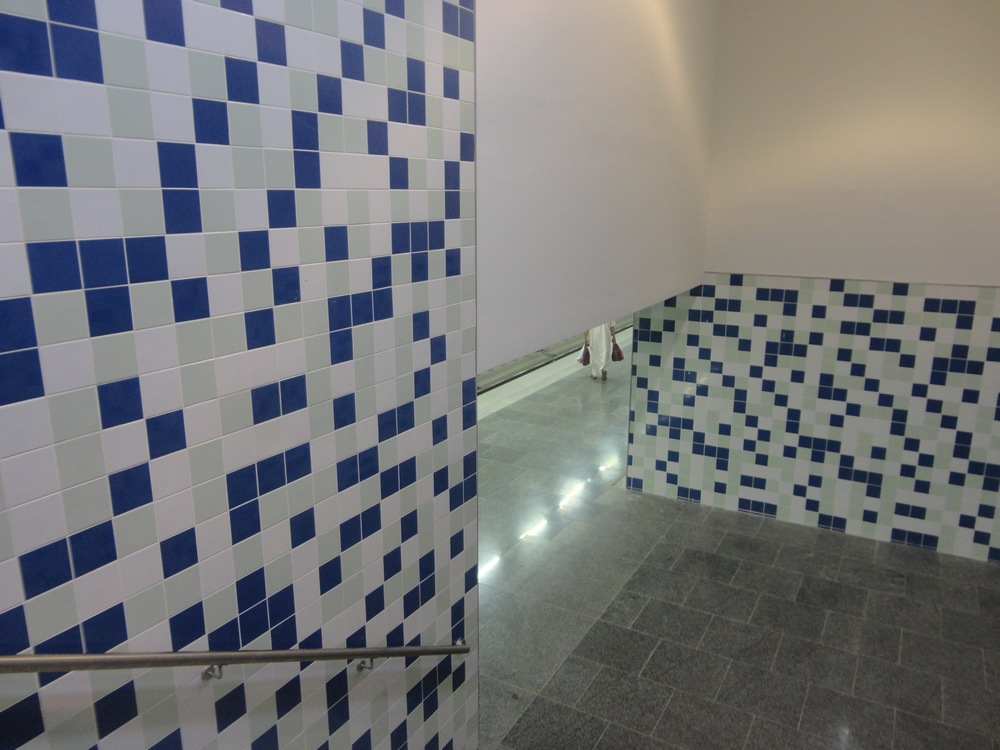
Stairs to the dock.
