= Place des Martyrs Metro Station =

Station of the Algiers Metro

Place des Martyrs
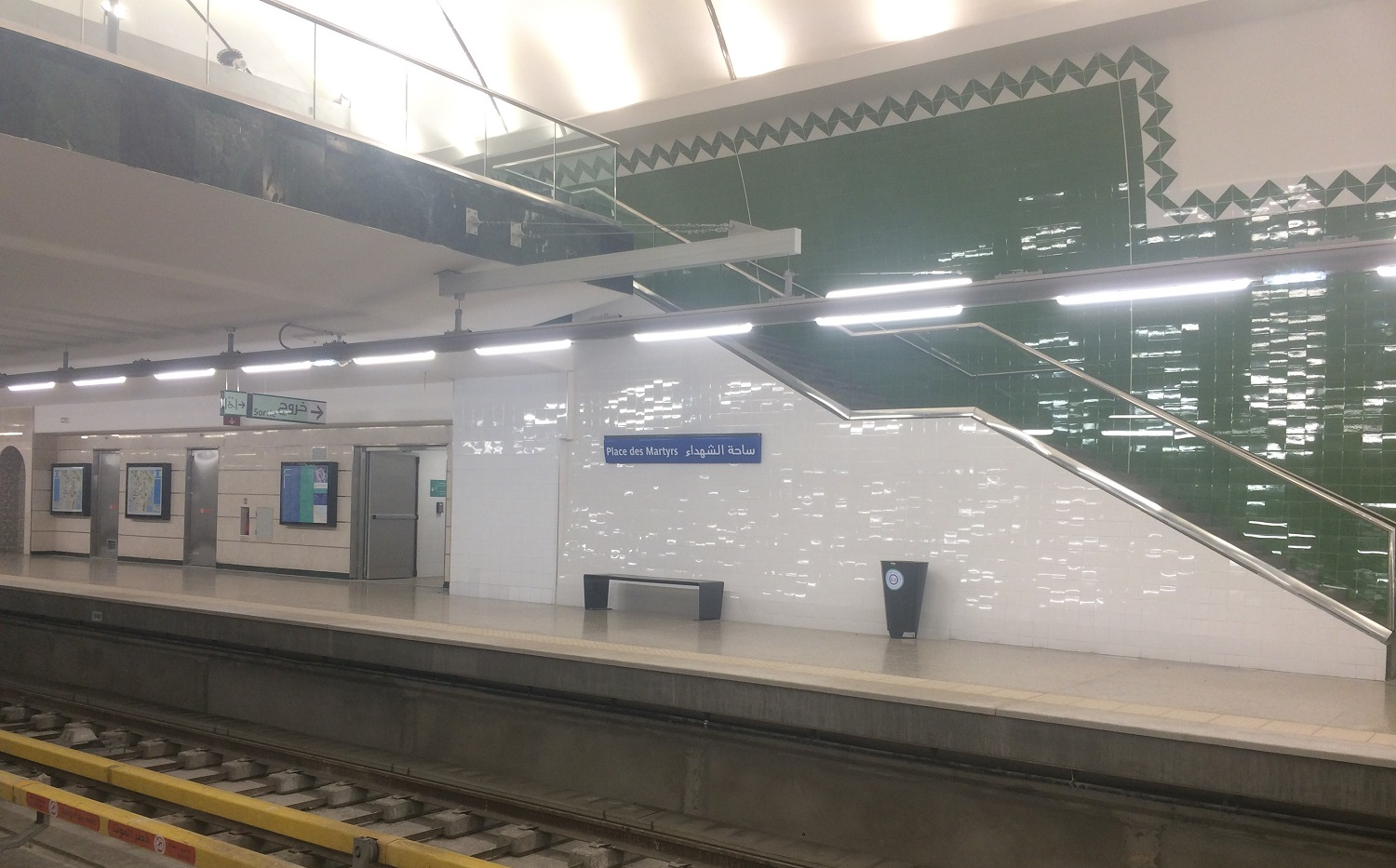

General information
- Location: Kasbah
- Coordinates: 36°47′8″N 3°03′44″E
- Line: Line 1
- Platforms: 2 side platforms at each line
- Tracks: 2 per line
- Connections: ETUSA 2, 5, 6, 8, 12, 36, 50, 58, 90, 98, 100, 101, 113, 121

Construction
- Accessible: yes

Other information
- Station code: SPM

History
- Opened: April 9, 2018 (Line 1)

Services
Preceding station	Algiers Metro	Following station
Terminus	Line 1	Ali Boumendjel towards El Harrach Centre
Location

Place des Martyrs is a transfer station serving the Line 1 of the Algiers Metro. It was inaugurated on 9 April 2018 by President Abdelaziz Bouteflika.

== Etymology ==
The Place des Martyrs metro station is also, in the opinion of specialists, an important step in the implementation of preventive archeology that has combined archaeological heritage and land use planning as part of the efforts to make from the capital a modern city. it is historic because of its location in the area of the ancient city of Ikosim which contains a rich archaeological heritage.

With an area of 8,000 m2, the Place des Martyrs was, before the advent of colonialism, a political and commercial center: hence the archaeological discoveries gradually brought to light. these are archaeological remains scattered over some 1,500 m2 and four (4) strata representing different periods of the history of the city of Algiers. the visitor can see today at the Place des Martyrs the emerging part of these excavations, in this case Roman, Byzantine and Ottoman era remains of the city on an area of 750 m^{2}, while other vestiges remain buried pending an appropriate development.

== Gallery ==
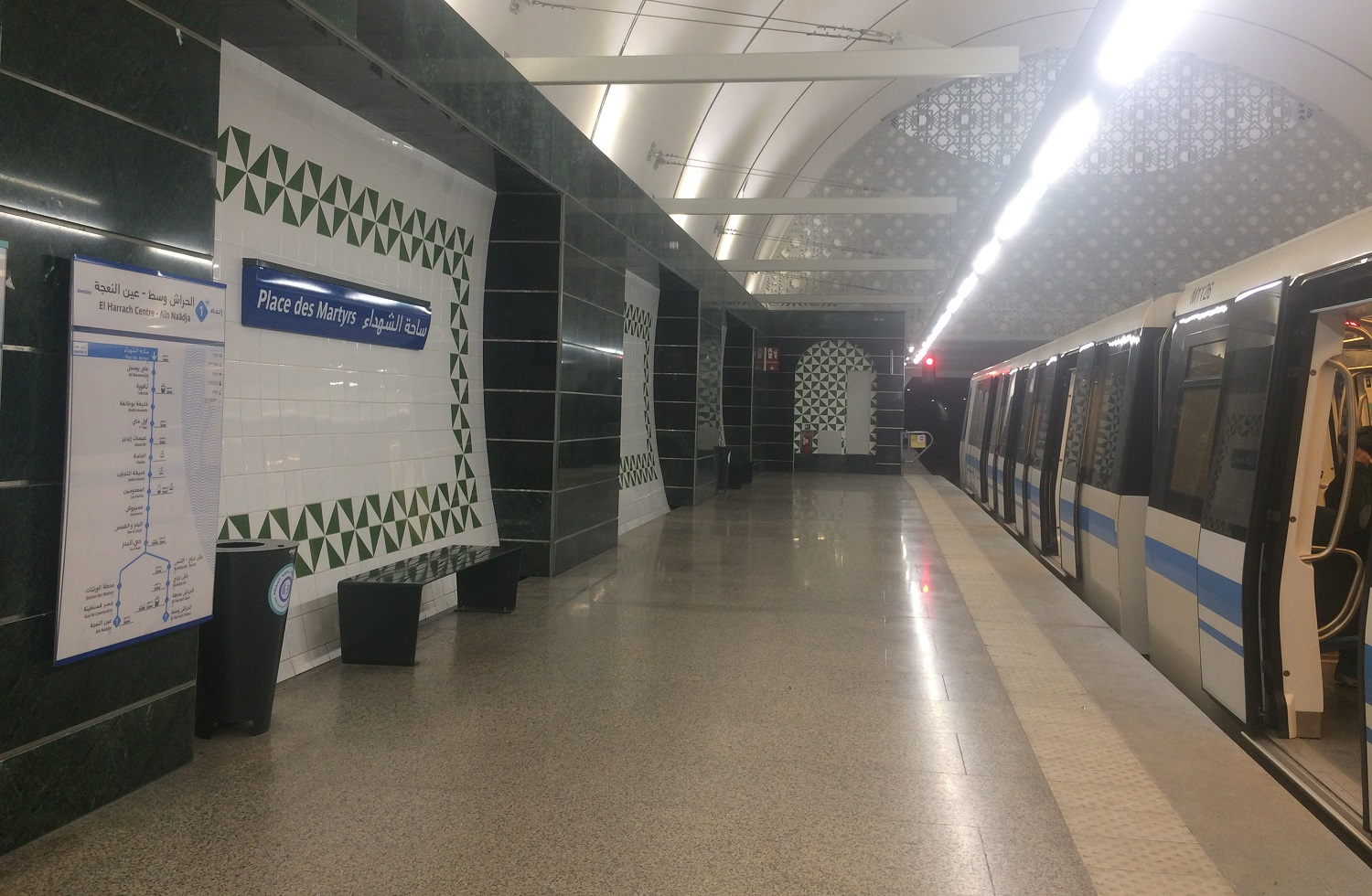
Platform of the metro station Place des Martyrs d'Alger.

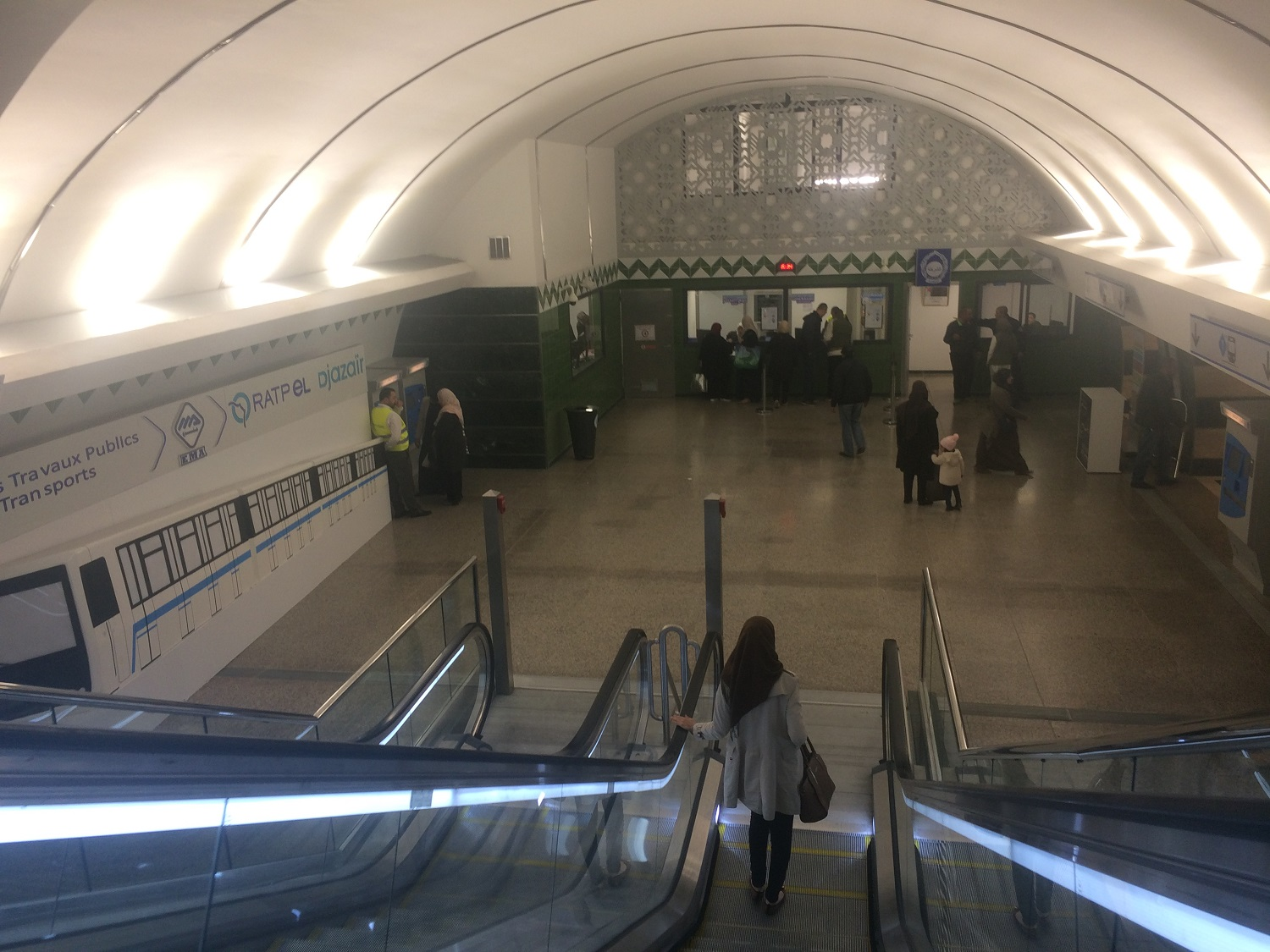
Hall ticketing station.

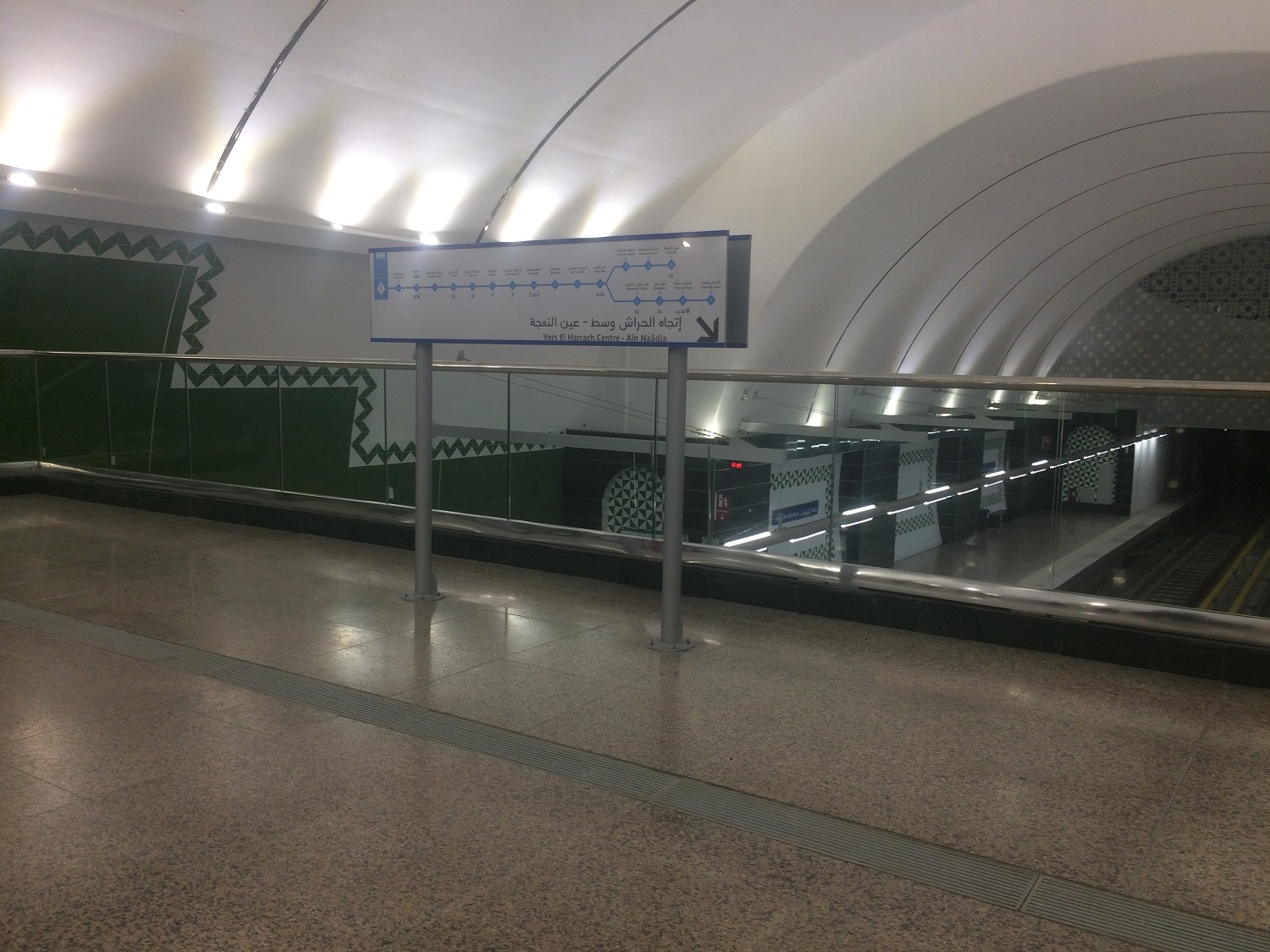
Platforms seen from the mezzanine.

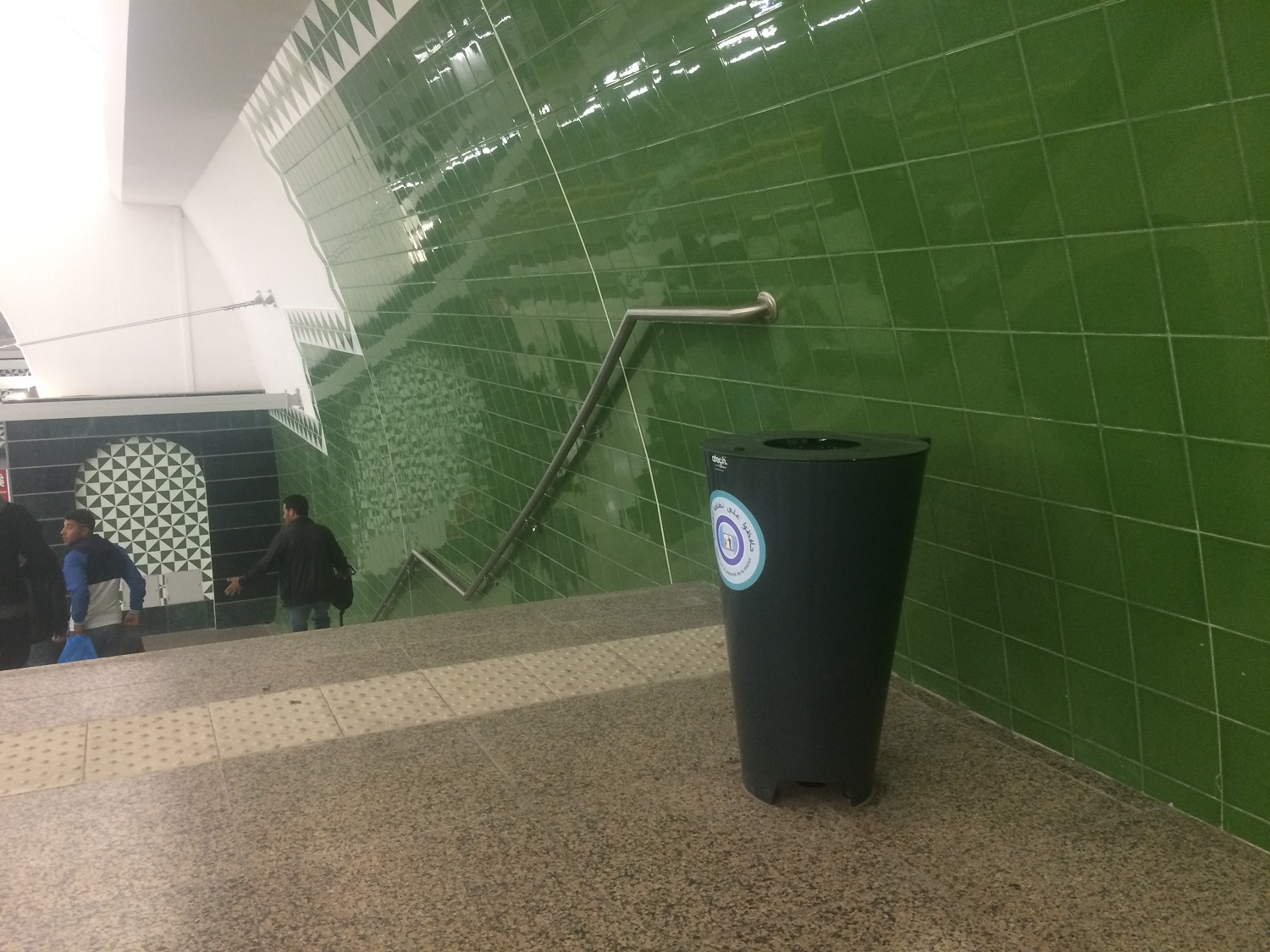
Station furniture.

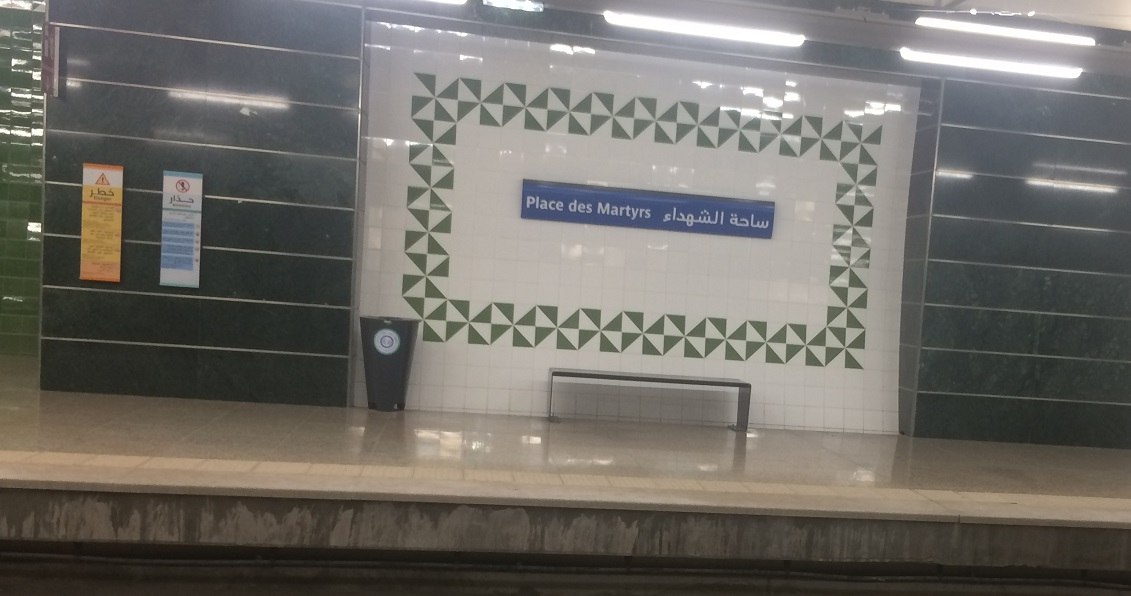
Station platform.

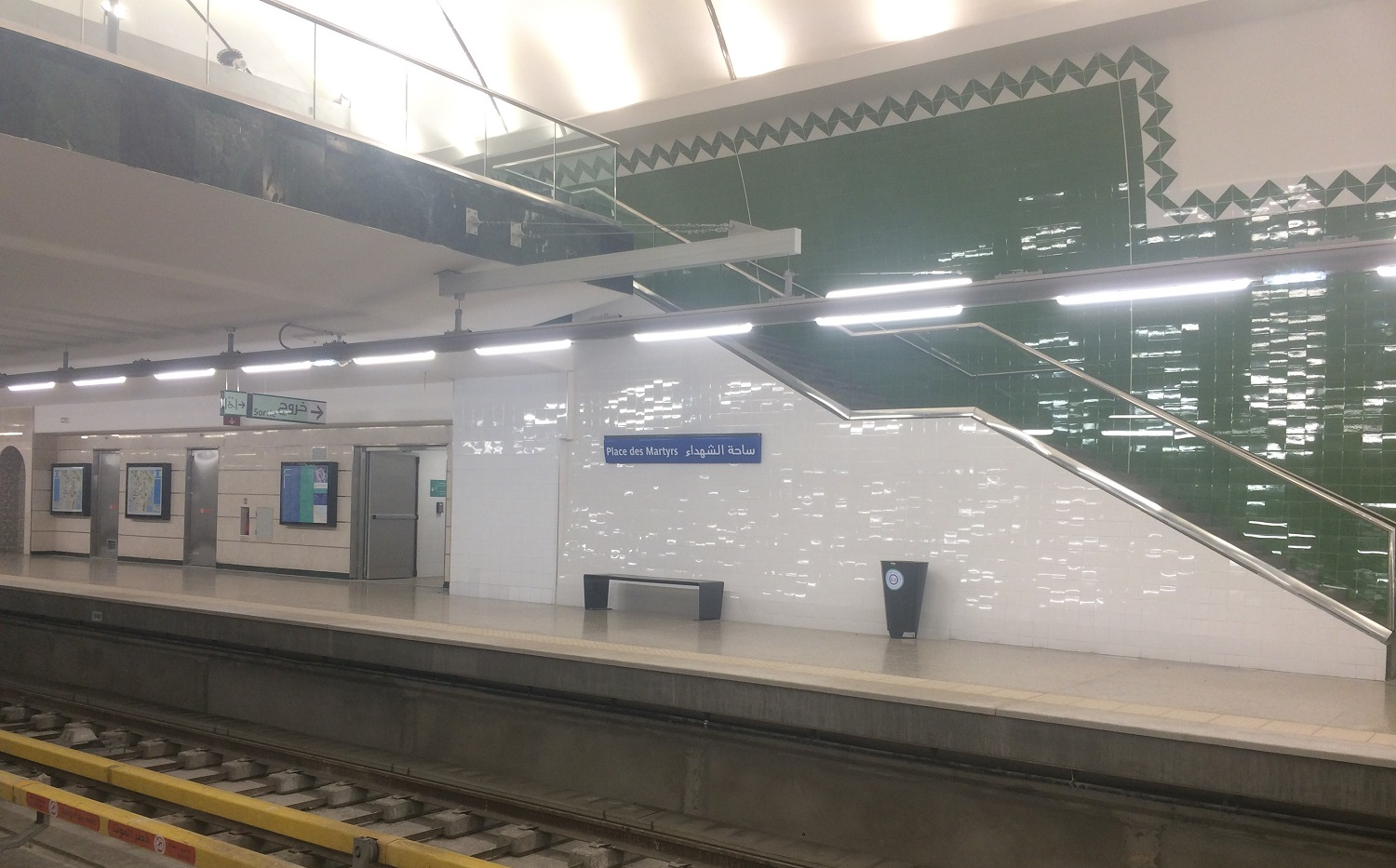
Station platform.

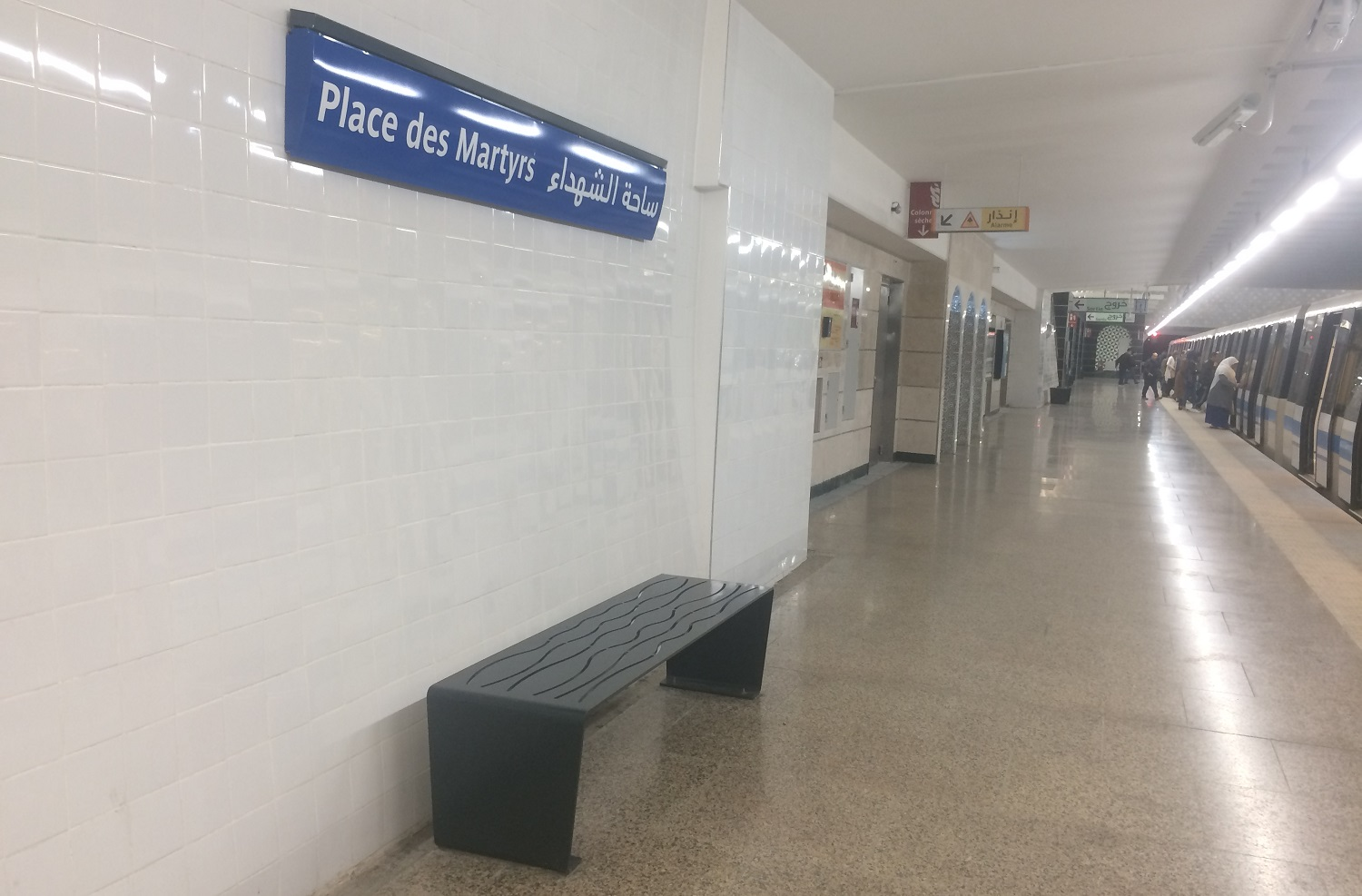
Station platform.

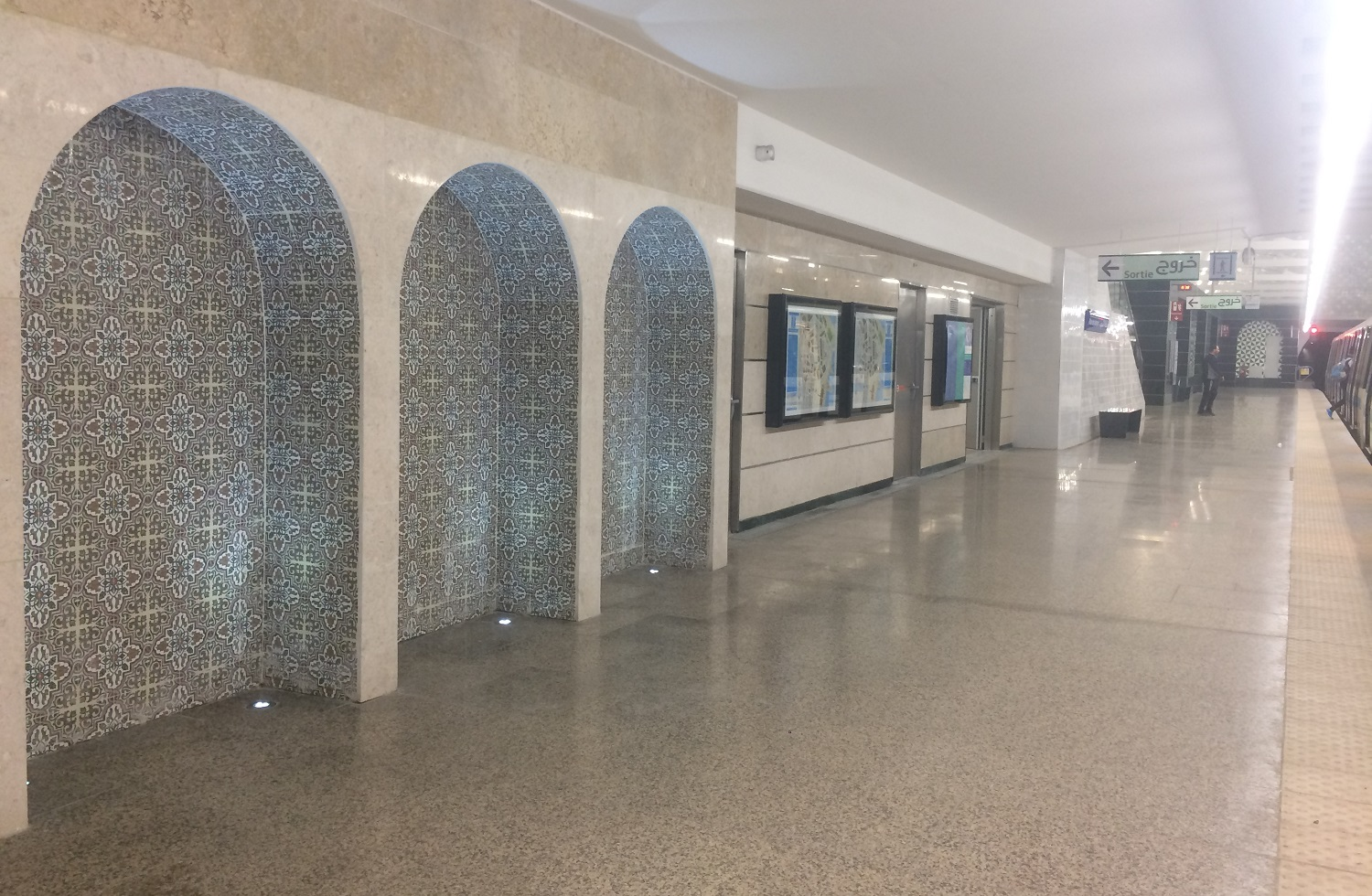
Station platform.

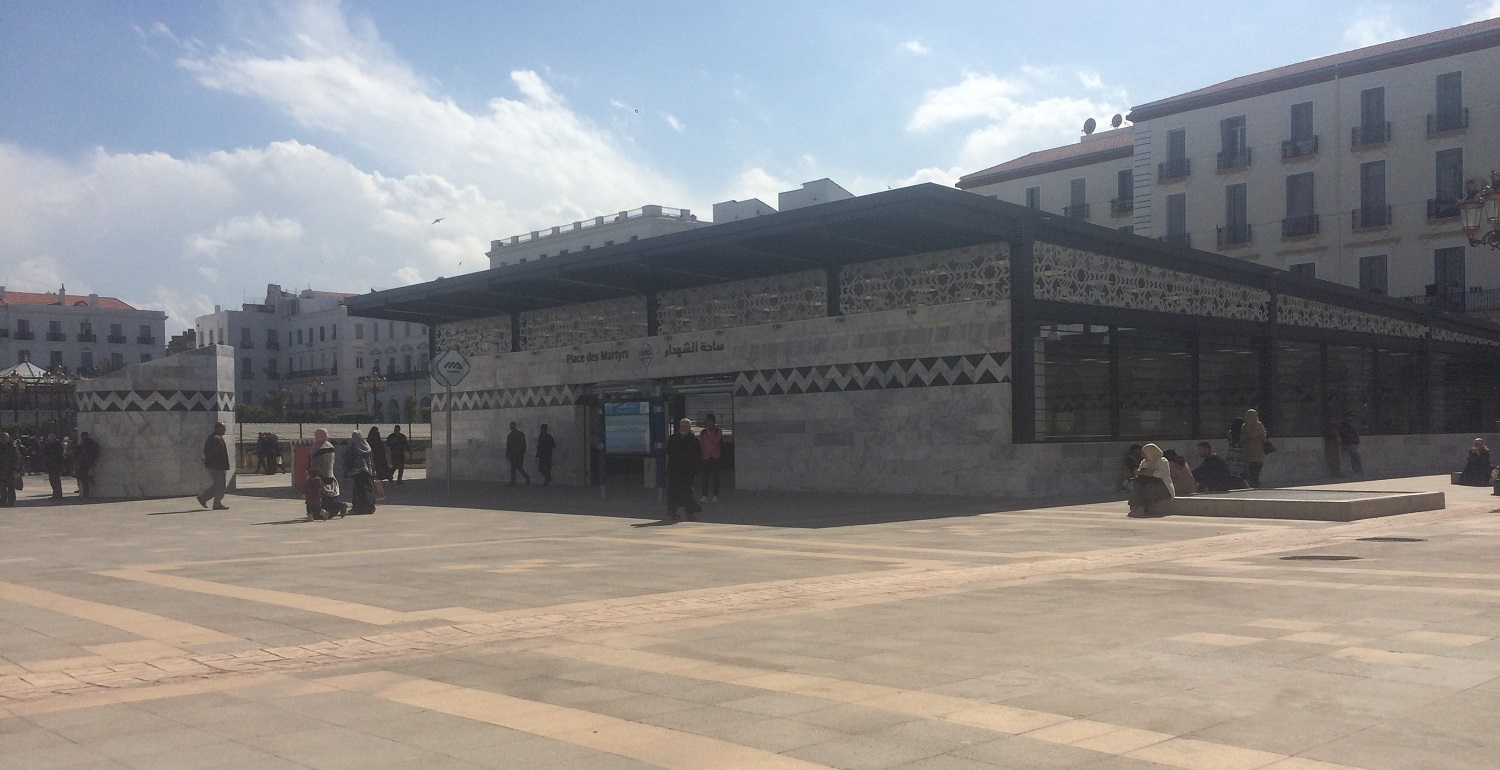
Main entrance of the station Place des Martyrs metro Algiers.

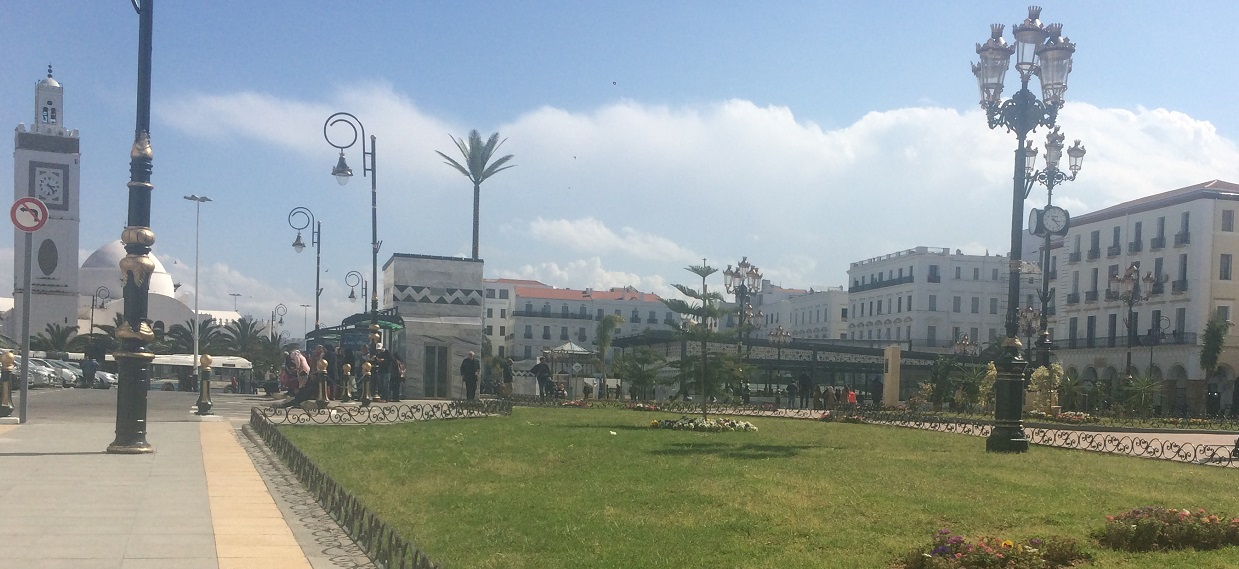
View of the main access of the station Place des Martyrs metro Algiers.
