= Sidi Abdellah =

Sidi Abdellah سيدي عبد الله
- Delegated Wilaya
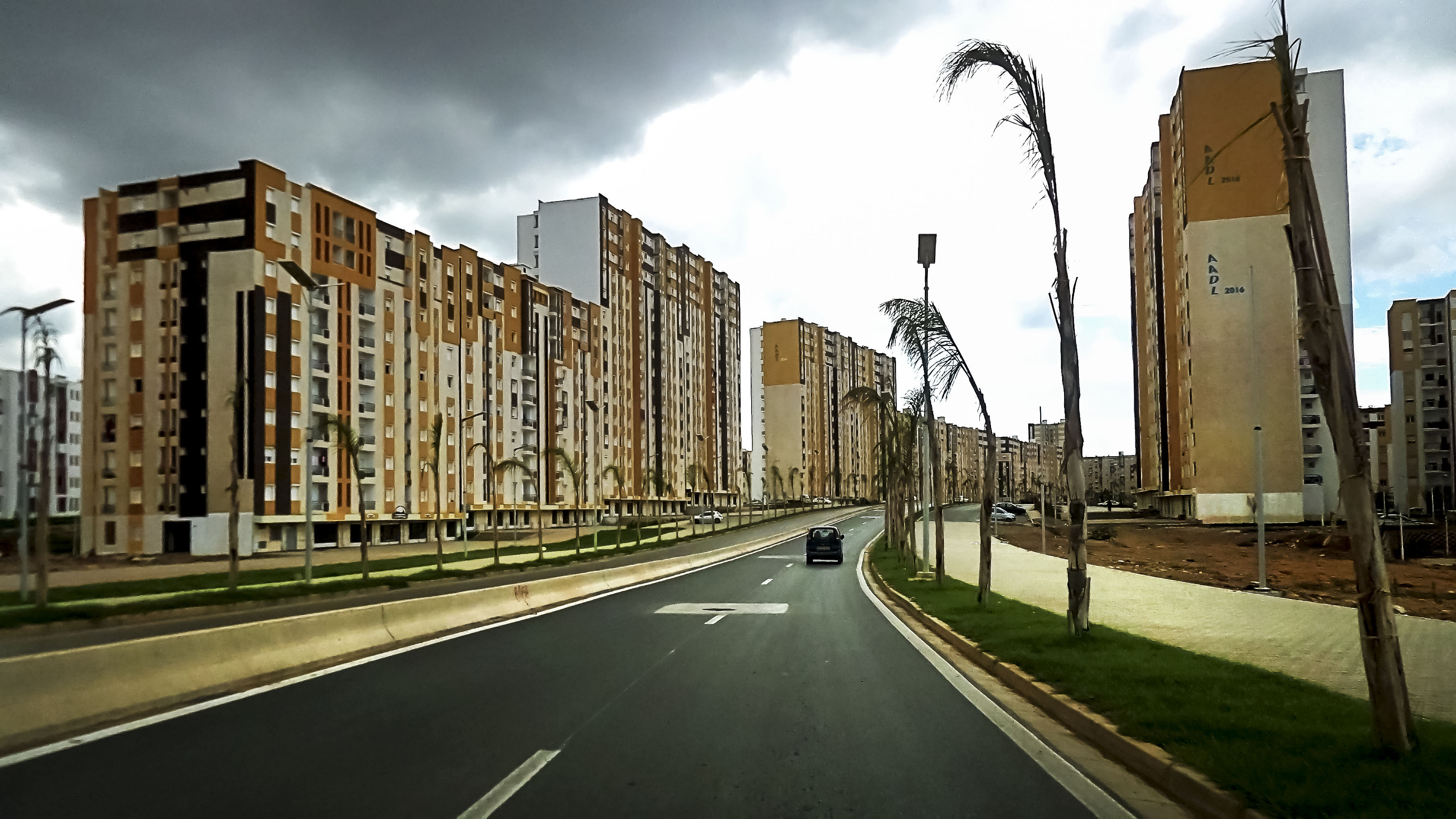
- Sidi Abdellah on 2 October 2017

- Location of Zéralda District, the site of Sidi Abdellah, within Algiers Province

- Location of Sidi Abdellah within Algeria
- Coordinates: 36°40′39″N 002°53′17″E
- Country: Algeria
- Province: Algiers
- District: Zéralda
- Municipalities: Douéra, Mahelma, Rahmania, and Zéralda
- Established: 5 September 2004

Area
  - Total: 70 km^{2} (27 sq mi)
- Time zone: UTC+01 (CET)
- Website: www.vnsa.dz

Sidi Abdellah is a planned community in Algeria in the southwestern suburbs of Algiers. It was created as a model of sustainable development by emphasizing an open urban fabric that does not suffer from the stifling overcrowding in the neighborhoods of Algiers.

== History ==
Sidi Abdellah was created by Executive Decree 04-275 of 5 September 2004, which was amended and supplemented by Executive Decree No. 20-29 of 12 October 2020. It was elevated to the rank of "delegated wilaya" in 2018.

== Location and area ==
Sidi Abdellah is 20 kilometres (12 mi) southwest of the Wilayah of Algiers. It lies in the Zéralda District on the territories of four municipalities: Douéra, Mahelma, Rahmania, and Zéralda.

The Sidi Abdellah city project has a total area of 7,000 hectares (17,297 acres), i.e.,70 square kilometres (27 sq mi), of which 45% — an area of 3,158 hectares (7,804 acres), i.e.,31.6 square kilometres (12.2 sq mi) — is urbanized.

== Transportation ==
Two railway stations lie within the boundaries of Sidi Abdellah, the Sidi Abdellah and the Université de Sidi Abdellah. They are located on the Birtouta–Zéralda line and are served by trains from the Algiers suburban rail network managed by the National Company for Rail Transport (SNTF).

== Future projections ==
When it was created in 2004, Sidi Abdellah was projected to include 54,000 dwellings and 270,000 inhabitants when completed. In 2020, this was revised to a projected 90,000 dwellings and 450,000 inhabitants when completed.

When completed, the community is planned to have eight districts: a city center; an information and communications technologies district; a pharmaceutical district; a commercial district; a university district; a security district; a health district; and a relaxation and leisure district.
