= Zéralda District =

Zéralda District دائرة زرالدة
- District
- Map of Algeria highlighting Algiers Province

- Map of Algiers Province highlighting Zéralda District
- Coordinates: 36°43′05″N 2°51′01″E
- Country: Algeria
- Province: Algiers
- District seat: Chéraga

Population (1998)
  - Total: 104,151
- Time zone: UTC+01 (CET)
- District code: 01
- Municipalities: 5

Zéralda is a district in Algiers Province, Algeria. It was named after its capital, Zéralda. It is the least populous district in the province, and used to be part of Tipaza Province.

== Municipalities ==
The district is further divided into five municipalities:

- Zéralda
- Staouéli
- Souidania
- Rahmania
- Mahelma

== Notable people ==
- Mohamed Belhocine, Algerian medical scientist, professor of internal medicine and epidemiology.
