= Zeralda Forest =

Forest in Algiers Province, Algeria

- Interactive map of Zeralda Forest

Geography
- Location: Zéralda, Algiers Province, Algeria
- Coordinates: 36°42′38″N 2°52′09″E
- Elevation: 50 m (160 ft)
- Area: 1,078 ha (2,660 acres)

Zeralda Forest is a forest located in Zeralda, in the Mitidja region of Algiers Province. It is managed by the Forest Conservation Authority of Algiers (CFA), which operates under the supervision of the General Directorate of Forests (DGF).

== History ==
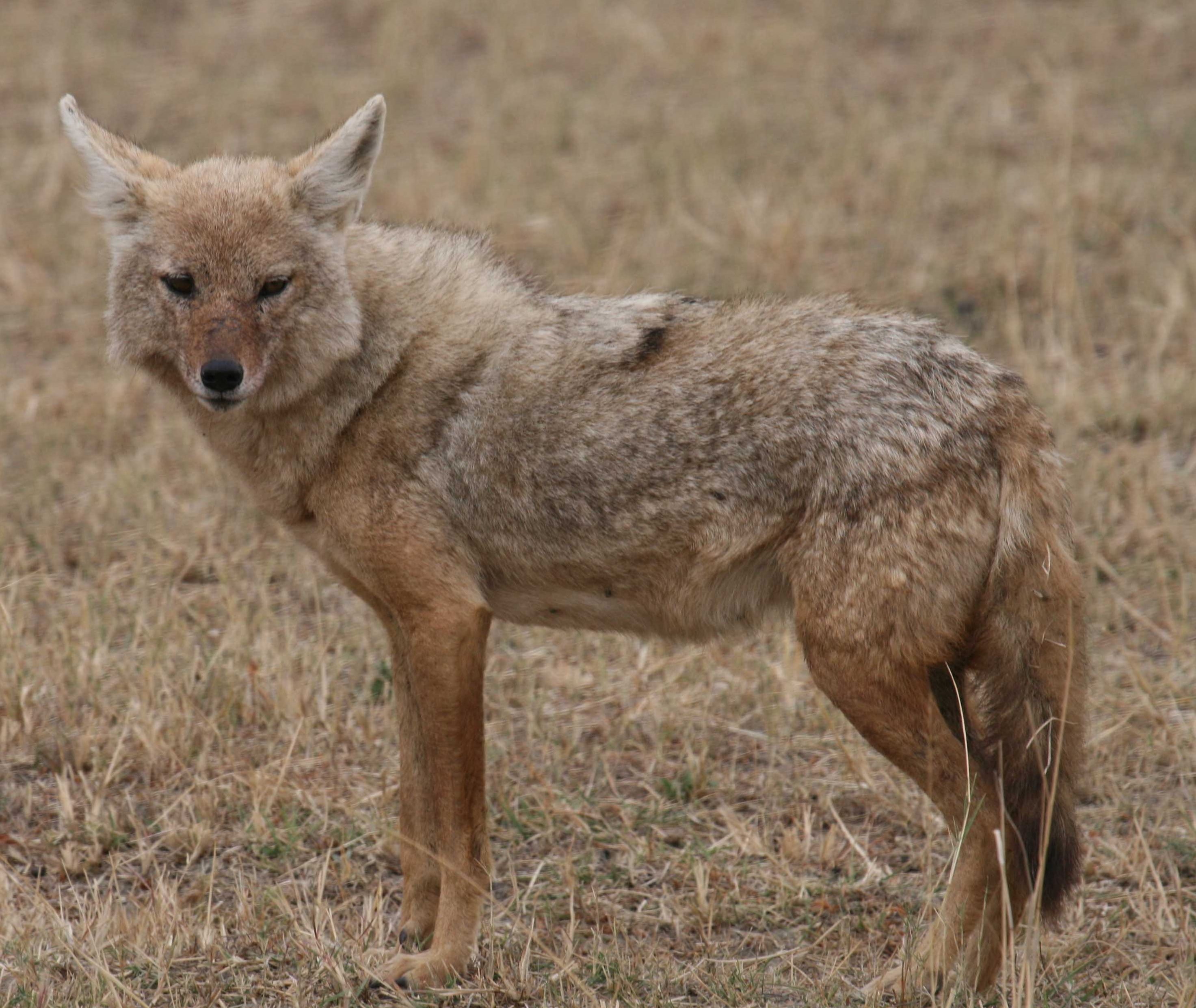
African wolf

The forest is subject to the provisions outlined in Decree 84-45 of February 18, 1984, as amended by Decree 07-09 of January 11, 2007.

On February 17, 2011, Decree 11-02 was issued regarding protected areas, which provided a new impetus to the protection of the forest. Previously classified as a Game reserve, the forest was now designated as a protected area along with the Oggaz reserve in the Mascara Province, Ain Ghoraba in the Tlemcen Province, Ain Maabed in the Djelfa Province, and the Biosphere Reserve in the municipality of Reghaia.

== Location ==
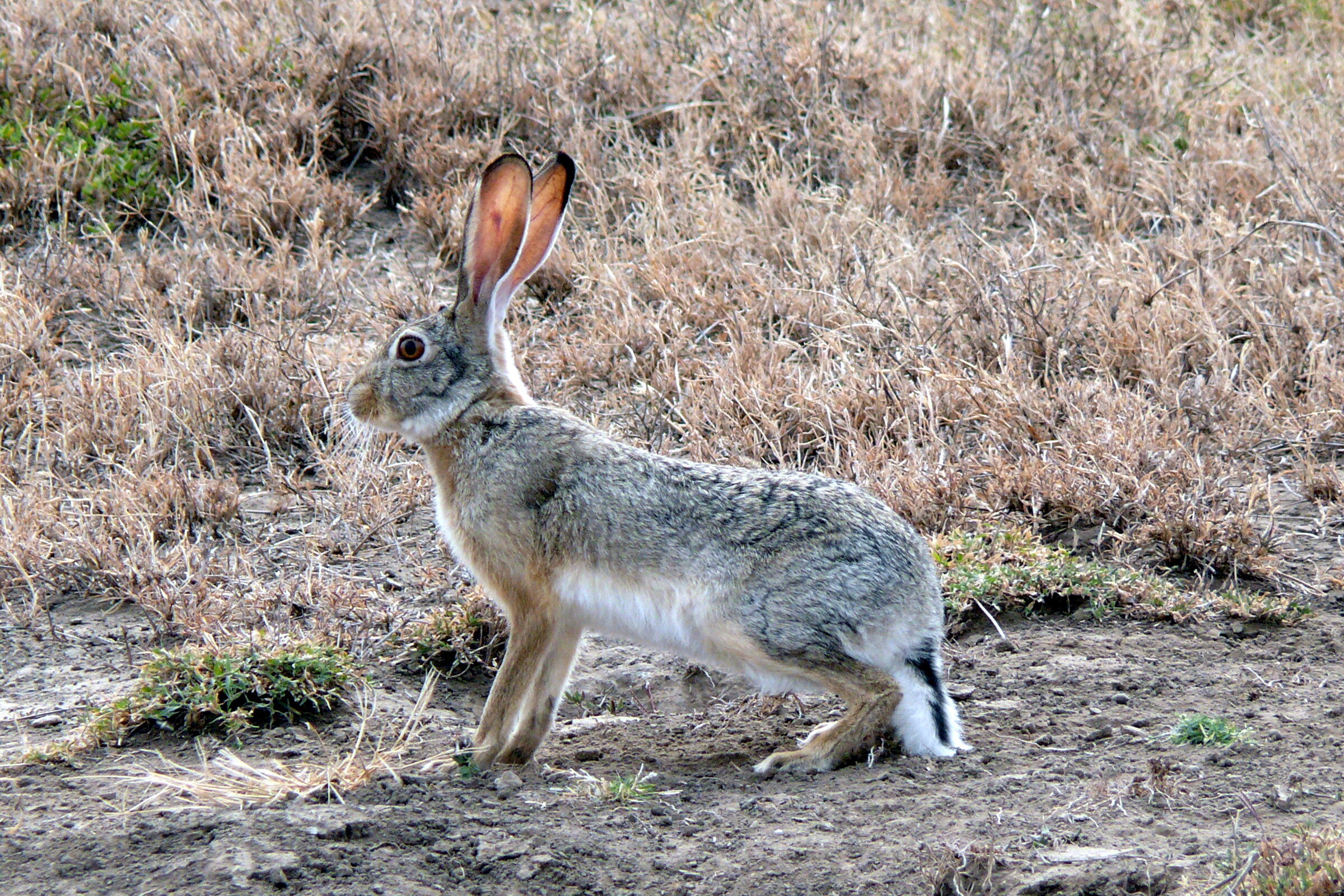
Cape hare

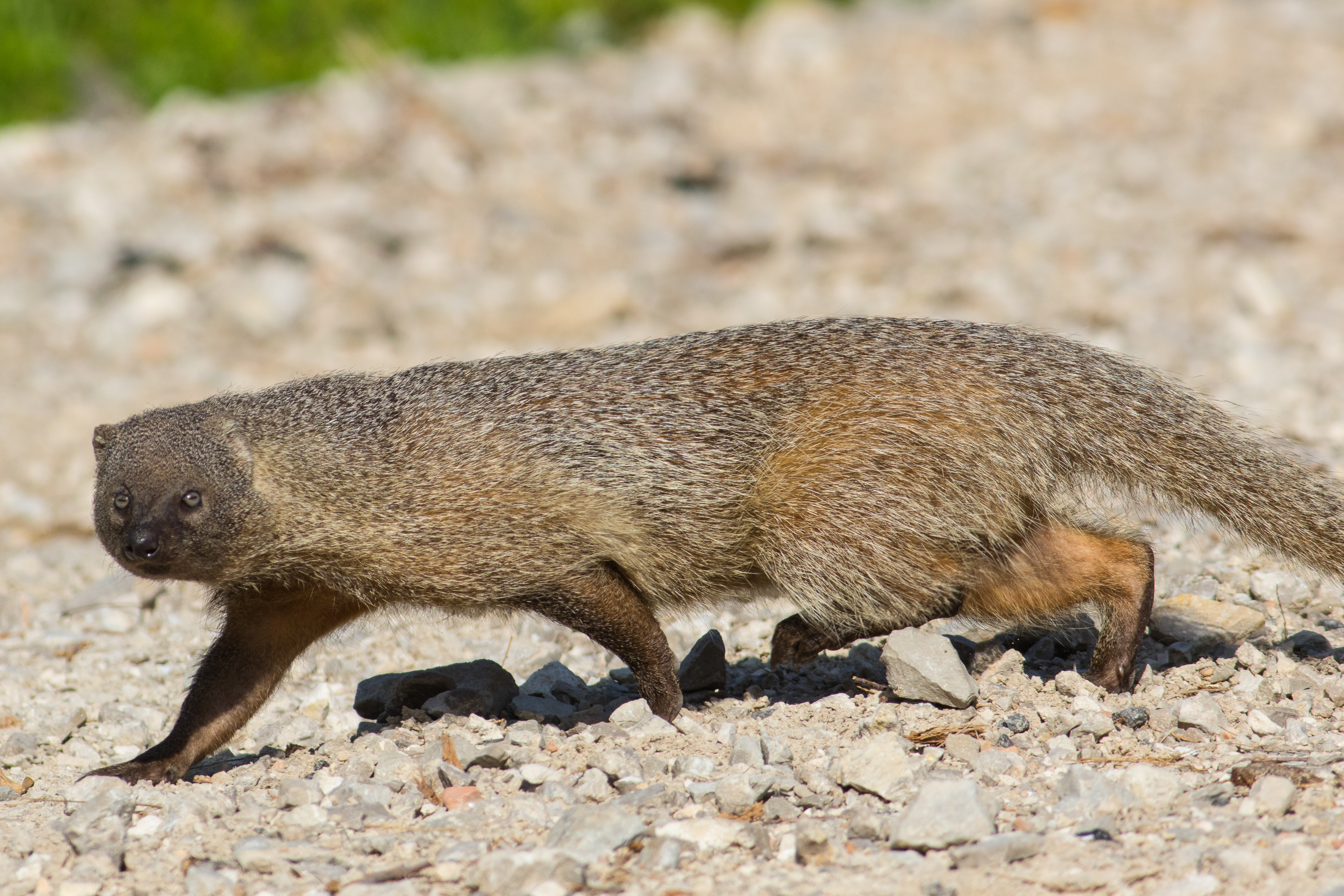
Egyptian mongoose

Zeralda Forest is situated at a distance of 30 km to the west of Algiers, 50 km to the east of Tipaza, and 2 km from the Mediterranean Sea. It is located between the municipalities of Zeralda, Mahelma, Souidania, Staoueli, and Rahmania in Mitidja.

== Animals ==
- African wolf (Binomial nomenclature: Canis lupaster)
- Crested porcupine (Binomial nomenclature: Hystrix cristata)
- North African hedgehog (Binomial nomenclature: Atelerix algirus)
- European rabbit (Binomial nomenclature: Oryctolagus cuniculus)
- Common genet (Binomial nomenclature: Genetta genetta afra)
- Egyptian mongoose (Binomial nomenclature: Herpestes ichneumon)
- Cape hare (Binomial nomenclature: Lepus capensis)
- Barbary stag (Binomial nomenclature: Cervus elaphus barbarus benetti)
- Wild boar (Binomial nomenclature: Sus scrofa)

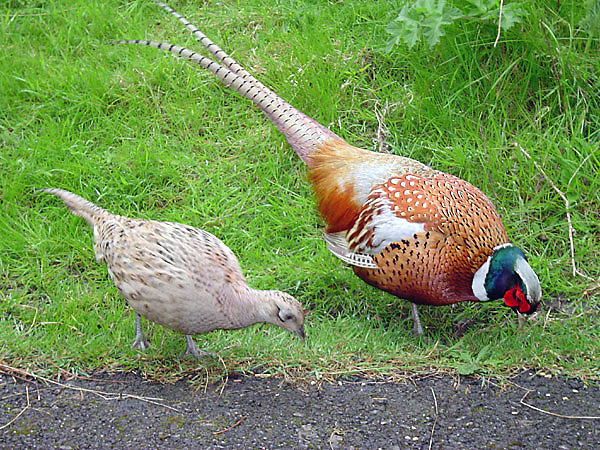
Pheasant

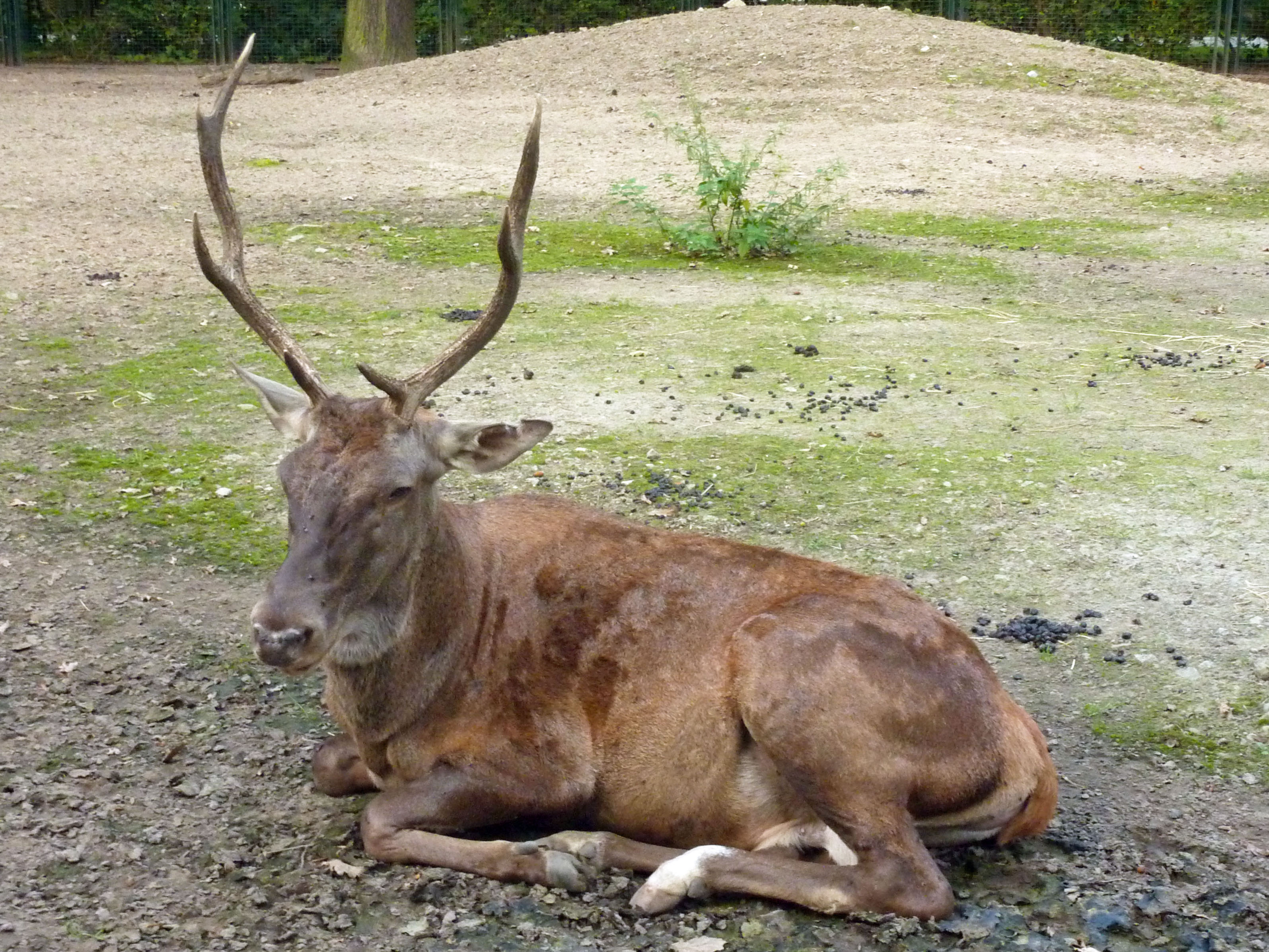
Barbary stag
