= Draria District =

Coordinates: 36.716234°N 2.997208°E

Draria District دائرة درارية
- District
- Map of Algeria highlighting Algiers Province

- Map of Algiers Province highlighting Draria District
- Country: Algeria
- Province: Algiers
- District seat: Draria

Population (1998)
  - Total: 115,895
- Time zone: UTC+01 (CET)
- District code: 03
- Municipalities: 5

Draria is a district in Algiers Province, Algeria. It was named after its capital, Draria.

== Municipalities ==
The district is further divided into 5 municipalities:

- Draria
- Baba Hecène
- Douéra
- Khraïcia
- El Achour
