= Chéraga District =

Coordinates: 36°46′N 2°57′E

Chéraga District دائرة شراقة
- District
- Map of Algeria highlighting Algiers Province

- Map of Algiers Province highlighting Chéraga District
- Country: Algeria
- Province: Algiers
- District seat: Chéraga

Population (1998)
  - Total: 178,153
- Time zone: UTC+01 (CET)
- District code: 02
- Municipalities: 5

Chéraga is a district in Algiers Province, Algeria. It was named after its capital, Chéraga.

== Municipalities ==
The district is further divided into 5 municipalities:

- Chéraga
- Hammamet
- Dély Ibrahim
- Aïn Bénian
- Ouled Fayet
