= Hussein Dey (disambiguation) =

Hussein Dey was the last ruler of Ottoman Algeria.

Hussein Dey may also refer to:

- Hussein Dey District, a district in Algeria
- Hussein Dey (commune), a suburb of Algiers
- NA Hussein Dey, a football club
