= List of metropolitan areas in Algeria =

Algeria has three major metropolitan areas that span multiple provinces.

== Algiers Metropolitan Area ==
The Algiers Metropolitan Area consists of four provinces: Tipaza, Blida, Algiers, and Boumerdès. It spans approximately 5,726 km^{2} and had a population of 5,384,175 as of the 2008 census. Projections estimate that the population may exceed 9 million.

The area is served by a modern railway system, the Algiers Tramway, and the Algiers Metro. There are plans to expand public transport to the surrounding provinces of Tipaza and Boumerdès.

Notable urban and suburban areas include Sidi Abdellah and Hydra. Major commercial and industrial zones are located in Reghaïa and Ouled Hedadj. The metropolitan area is also home to key maritime trade infrastructure, including the Port of Algiers and the planned Port of El Hamdania.

== Sétif–Constantine Metropolitan Area ==
The Sétif–Constantine Metropolitan Area includes seven provinces: Sétif, Béjaïa, Bordj Bou Arréridj, Mila, Constantine, Skikda, and Annaba. It covers an area of approximately 24,946 km^{2} and had a population of 6,238,698. Current estimates suggest the population may be closer to 8 million.

The region is connected by a national rail system, and major cities such as Constantine and Sétif have operational tramway networks. Tramway projects are also planned for Béjaïa and Annaba.

This metropolitan area hosts several of the largest commercial and industrial zones in North Africa, including El Eulma, Chelghoum Laïd, El Hadjar, and Akbou. Major urban centers include Sétif city, Constantine city, El Khroub, Béjaïa, and Annaba. The area also encompasses important agricultural zones, particularly in Béjaïa and Bordj Bou Arréridj.

Key maritime ports serving the region include the Port of Béjaïa, Port of Annaba, and Port of Skikda.

== Oran Metropolitan Area ==
The Oran Metropolitan Area comprises seven provinces: Oran, Aïn Témouchent, Mostaganem, Tlemcen, Sidi Bel Abbès, Mascara, and Relizane. It covers a total area of 35,643 km^{2} and had a population of approximately 5,757,096, with estimates indicating a population nearing 7 million.

The region is served by a high-speed rail line linking Oran, Sidi Bel Abbès, and Tlemcen, as well as modern rail connections between other provinces. Tramway systems are currently operational in Oran, Sidi Bel Abbès, and Mostaganem. Expansion projects are planned for Mascara, Relizane, and Tlemcen.

Notable urban and suburban centers include Oran city, Sidi Bel Abbès, Tlemcen, and Mostaganem. The area includes major industrial zones such as Es Sénia, Tafraoui, Hassi Mamèche, and Sig.

The region is also home to several key maritime ports, including the Port of Oran, Port of Mostaganem, Port of Ghazaouet, and Port of Béni Saf. Significant agricultural activity takes place in Mascara, Relizane, and the eastern parts of Mostaganem.

== See also ==
- Urbanization in Africa
