= Ain-bessem =

- Suburb
- Location within Algeria
- Coordinates: 36°24′14″N 3°43′33.1″E
- Country: Algeria
- Province: Algiers

Population (1998)
  - Total: 28,400
- Time zone: UTC+1 (West Africa Time)

Ain-bessem is a suburb of the city of Algiers in northern Algeria.
