= Bouzaréah District =

Coordinates: 36°47′41″N 3°02′06″E

Bouzaréah District دائرة بوزريعة
- District
- Map of Algeria highlighting Algiers Province

- Map of Algiers Province highlighting Bouzaréah District
- Country: Algeria
- Province: Algiers
- District seat: Bouzaréah

Population (1998)
  - Total: 158,629
- Time zone: UTC+01 (CET)
- District code: 06
- Municipalities: 4

Bouzaréah is a district in Algiers Province, Algeria. It was named after its capital, Bouzaréah.

== Municipalities ==
The district is further divided into 4 municipalities:

- Bouzaréah
- Béni Messous
- Ben Aknoun
- El Biar

== Buildings ==
- Villa Susini
