= Sidi M'Hamed District =

Sidi M'Hamed District دائرة سيدي أمحمد Daïra de Sidi M'Hamed
- District
- Map of Algeria highlighting Algiers Province

- Map of Algiers Province highlighting Sidi M'Hamed District
- Coordinates: 36°45′06″N 3°03′36″E
- Country: Algeria
- Province: Algiers
- District seat: Sidi M'Hamed

Population (1998)
  - Total: 267,691
- Time zone: UTC+01 (CET)
- District code: 09
- Municipalities: 4

Sidi M'Hamed is a district in Algiers Province, Algeria. It was named after its capital, Sidi M'Hamed.

== Municipalities ==
The district is further divided into four municipalities:

- Sidi M'Hamed
- El Madania
- El Mouradia
- Alger Centre

== Notable people ==
- Sidi M'hamed Bou Qobrine, Algerian berber theologian
- Lyès Deriche, 20th century leader of the Algerian national political movement against the French.
- Ahmed Mahsas, 20th century leader of the Algerian national political movement against the French.
