= Alger Centre =

Coordinates: 36°46′N 3°03′E

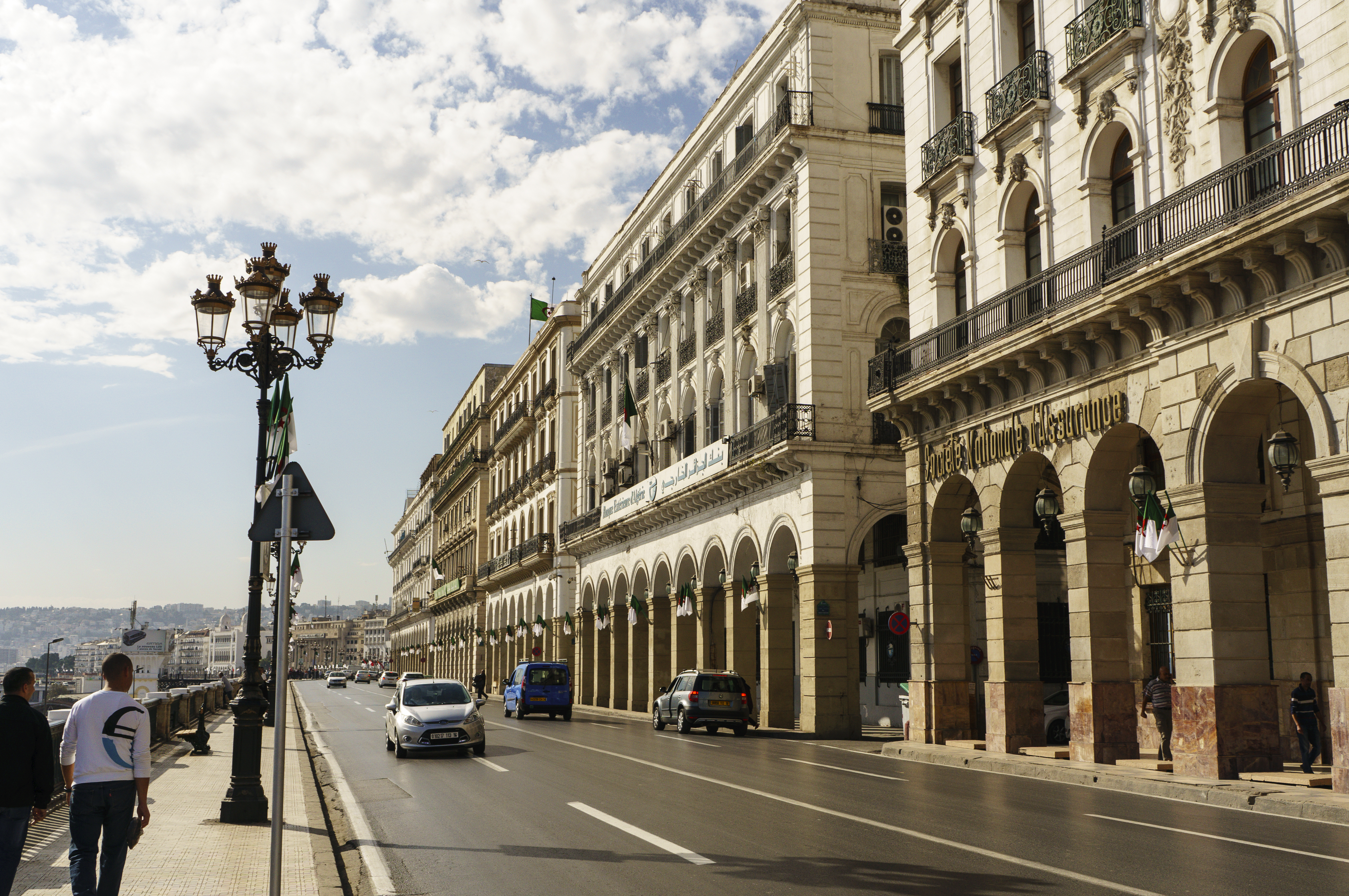
- Interactive map of Alger Centre
- Country: Algeria
- Province: Algiers

Population (2008)
  - Total: 75,541
- Time zone: UTC+1 (West Africa Time)

Alger Centre is a municipality in Algiers Province, Algeria. It is administratively part of Sidi M'Hamed district, and it has a population of 96,329 as of the 1998 census, which gives it 15 seats in the PMA.

Alger Centre joined the UNESCO Global Network of Learning Cities in 2024.

== Name ==
The name of the municipality is officially bilingual (French: Alger Centre, Arabic: الجزائر الوسطى or وسط الجزائر). The French name means "Algiers-Center" and the first version of the Arabic name means Central Algiers, and the later means "Center of Algiers". True to its name, this municipality forms the downtown of Algiers, and the port of Algiers is also located there.

== Notable people ==
- Ahmed Mahsas (1923–2013), Algerian nationalist militant and politician
