= Baraki District =

Coordinates: 36°24′N 3°06′E

Baraki District دائرة براقي
- District
- Map of Algeria highlighting Algiers Province

- Map of Algiers Province highlighting Baraki District
- Country: Algeria
- Province: Algiers
- District seat: Baraki

Population (1998)
  - Total: 219,445
- Time zone: UTC+01 (CET)
- District code: 11
- Municipalities: 3

Baraki is a district in Algiers Province, Algeria. It was named after its capital, Baraki. Baraki is located in the suburbs southeast of Algiers, and the capital of the Baraki district is situated about 14km southeast of Algiers and 35km northeast of Blida.

== Municipalities ==
The district is further divided into three municipalities, which is the lowest number in the province:

- Baraki
- Les Eucalyptus
- Sidi Moussa

== Location ==
Baraki is situated in the southeast of Algiers province, 10 km from the capital. It is bordered on the north by El-Harrach, Bourouba and Gue de Constantine; on the south by Sidi Moussa; on the east by L'Eucalyptus, and on the west by Ain-Naadja, Baba-Ali and S'haoula.
