= Baba Hassen =

Baba Hassen بابا حسن
- Commune
- Location within Algeria
- Coordinates: 36°42′N 2°58′E
- Country: Algeria
- Province: Algiers

Area
  - Land: 8.75 km^{2} (3.38 sq mi)

Population (2008)
  - Total: 60,000
  - Density: 2,715/km^{2} (7,030/sq mi)
- Time zone: UTC+1 (West Africa Time)

Baba Hassen (Arabic: بابا حسن) is a commune in Algiers Province and a suburb of the city of Algiers in northern Algeria. As of the 2008 census, the commune had a population of 23,756.
