= Birkhadem =

Coordinates: 36°43′N 3°03′E

Birkhadem بئر خادم
- Commune
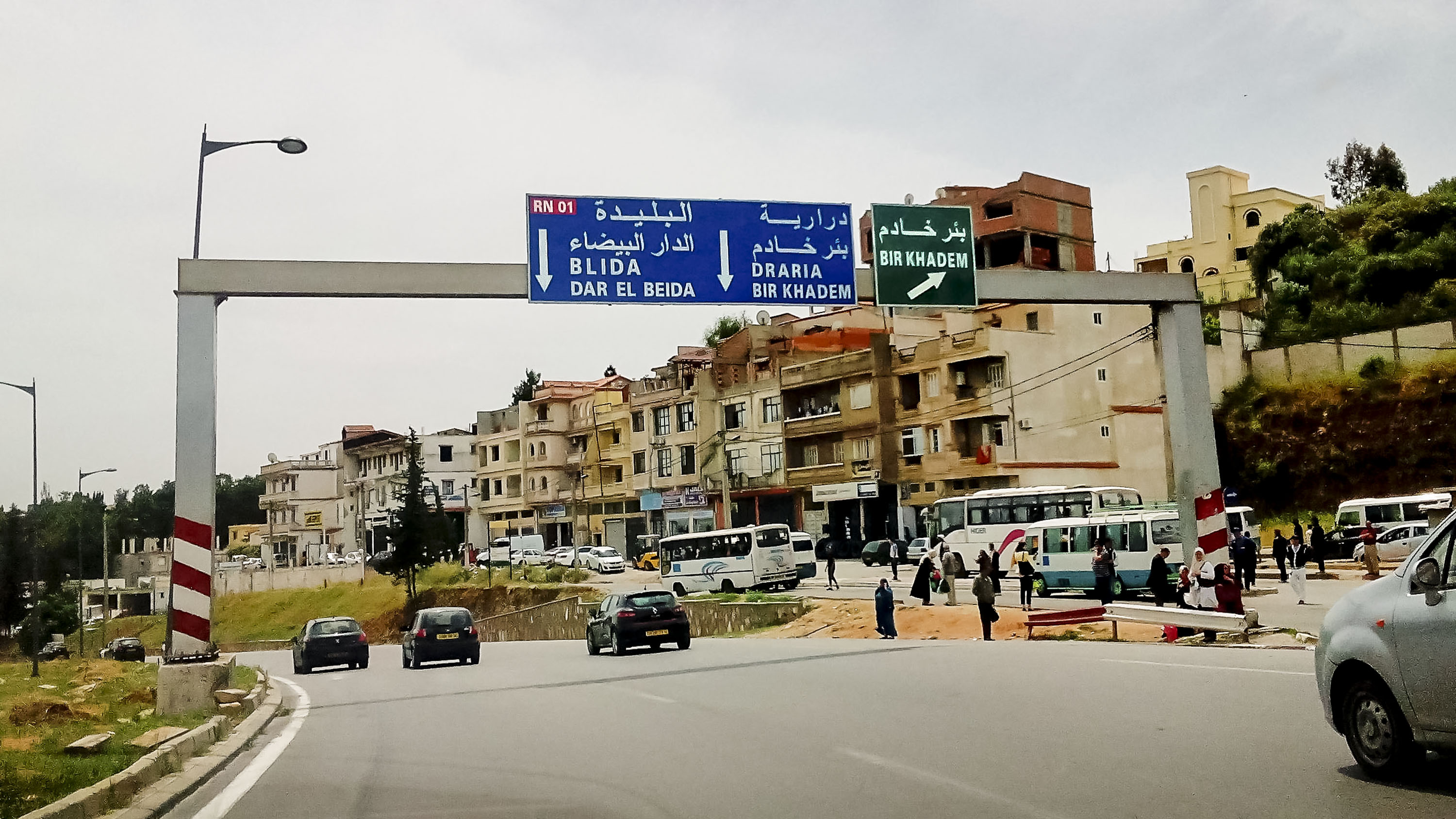
- Interactive map of Birkhadem
- Country: Algeria
- Province: Algiers

Area
  - Land: 8.92 km^{2} (3.44 sq mi)

Population (2008)
  - Total: 77,749
  - Density: 8,716.3/km^{2} (22,575/sq mi)
- Time zone: UTC+1 (CET)

Birkhadem or Bir Khadem (Arabic: بئر خادم) is a commune in Algiers Province and a suburb of the city of Algiers in northern Algeria. As of the 2008 census, it had a population of 77,749.

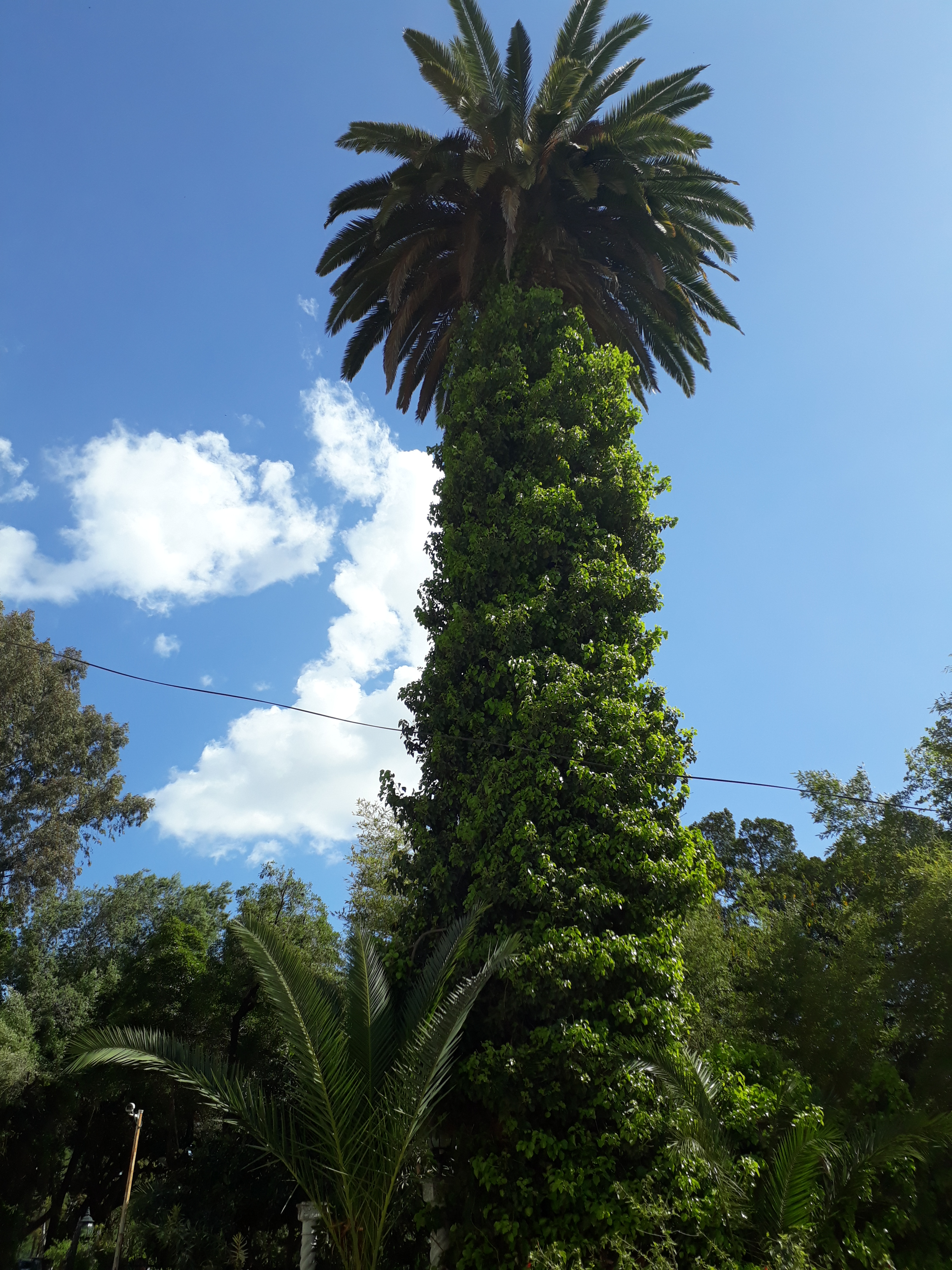
Birkhadem
