= Sidi Moussa, Algeria =

Sidi Moussa سيدي موسى
- Coordinates: 36°36′20″N 3°05′19″E
- Country: Algeria
- Province: Algiers
- District: Baraki

Area
  - Total: 39.56 km^{2} (15.27 sq mi)

Population (Average 1998-2008)
  - Total: 40,750
  - Density: 1,030/km^{2} (2,668/sq mi)
- Time zone: UTC+1 (CET)
- ONS-Code 1637

Sidi Moussa is a commune in the Baraki District of the Algiers Province and a suburb of the city of Algiers in northern Algeria. It is situated 15 km (9.3 mi) south of central Algiers.

== History ==
The commune was heavily struck by the Algerian Civil War: In 1993 and 1994 death squads conducted killings, in January 1997 there were further murders and in August 1997 the Rais massacre took place.
