= Baraki, Algiers =

Baraki براقي
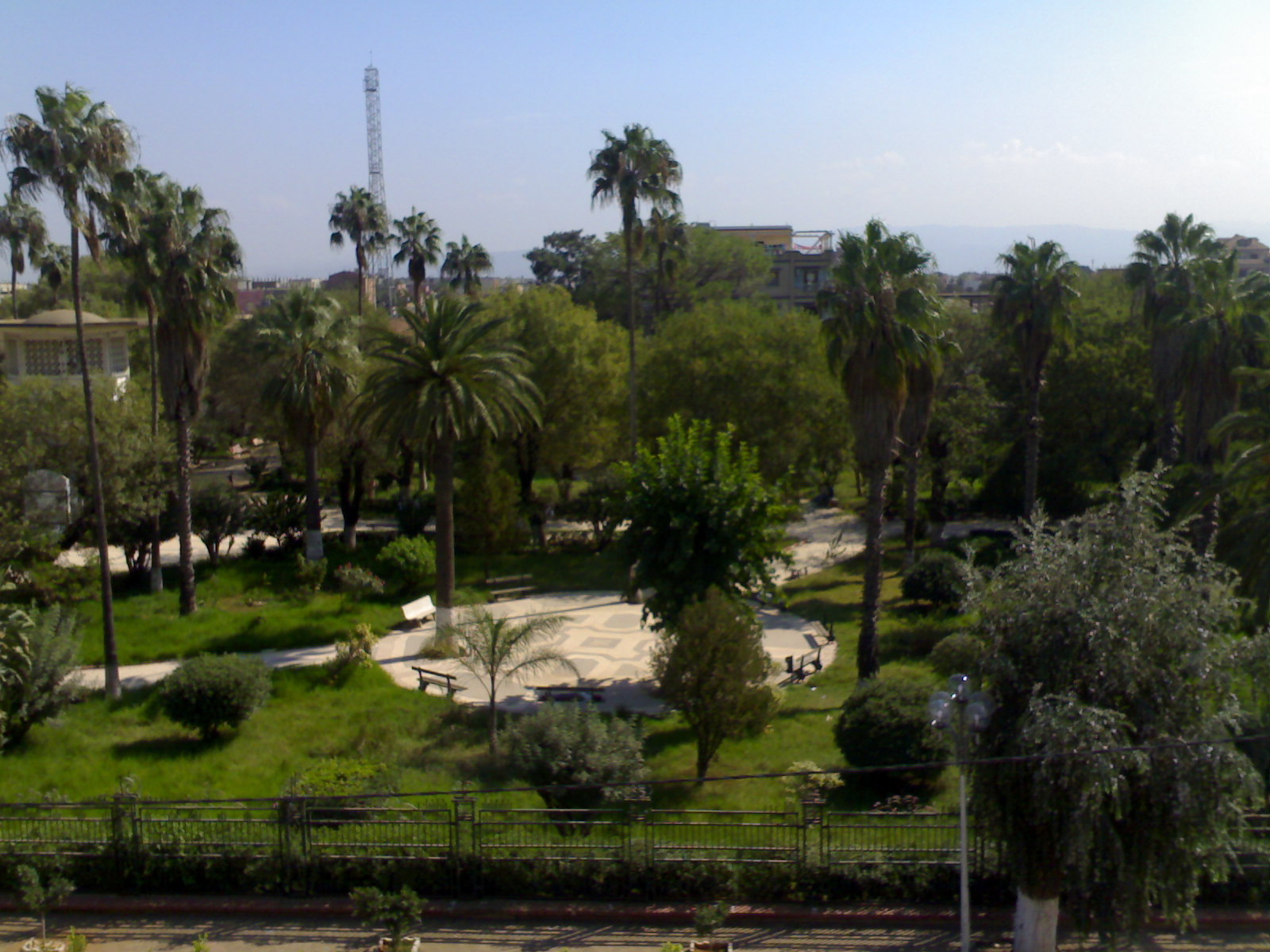
- Garden center of Baraki

- Location within Algeria
- Coordinates: 36°40′09″N 3°05′43″E
- Country: Algeria
- Province: Algiers
- District: Baraki District

Area
  - Total: 32 km^{2} (12 sq mi)
- Elevation: 33 m (108 ft)

Population (2012)
  - Total: 123,101
  - Density: 3,800/km^{2} (10,000/sq mi)
- Time zone: UTC+1 (CET)
- Postal code: 16027

Baraki (Arabic: براقي) is a commune belonging to Baraki District in Algiers Province in Northern Algeria.
