= Ouled Fayet =

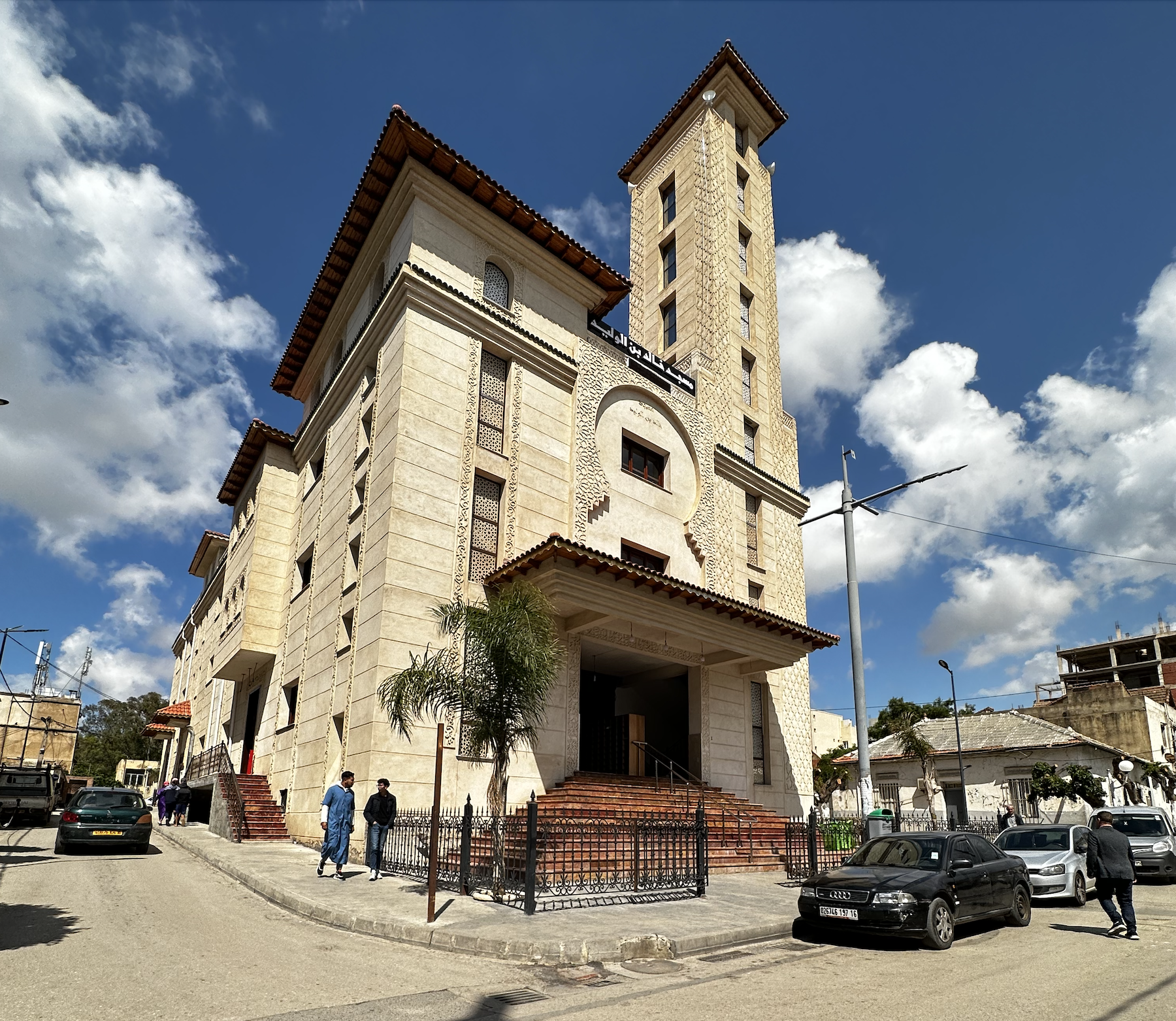
- New Khalid ibn al-Walid Mosque in Ouled Fayet.
- Nickname: أولاد فايت

- Location within Algeria
- Coordinates: 36°44′10.33″N 2°56′57.53″E
- Country: Algeria
- Province: Algiers

Population (2008)
  - Total: 27,593
- Time zone: UTC+1 (West Africa Time)

Ouled Fayet is a suburb of the city of Algiers in northern Algeria.

== History ==
The village of Ouled Fayet was created in 1842 on the site of a former farm; it was attached to the municipality of Dely Brahim. The village became a full-fledged municipality in 1888.

On May 31, 1963, the municipality was integrated into that of Draria, but by the ordinance of December 2, 1963, Ouled Fayet passed from the supervision of Draria to that of Cheraga. In 1984, Ouled Fayet was again an independent municipality, but it was integrated into the newly created wilaya (province) of Tipaza. In 1997, with the creation of the Governorate of Greater Algiers, the municipality was detached from the wilaya of Tipaza to rejoin that of Algiers.

== Notable people ==
- Lucien Auguste Camus, Father of Albert Camus. born the 28th November 1885.
