= Tessala El Merdja =

- Commune and town
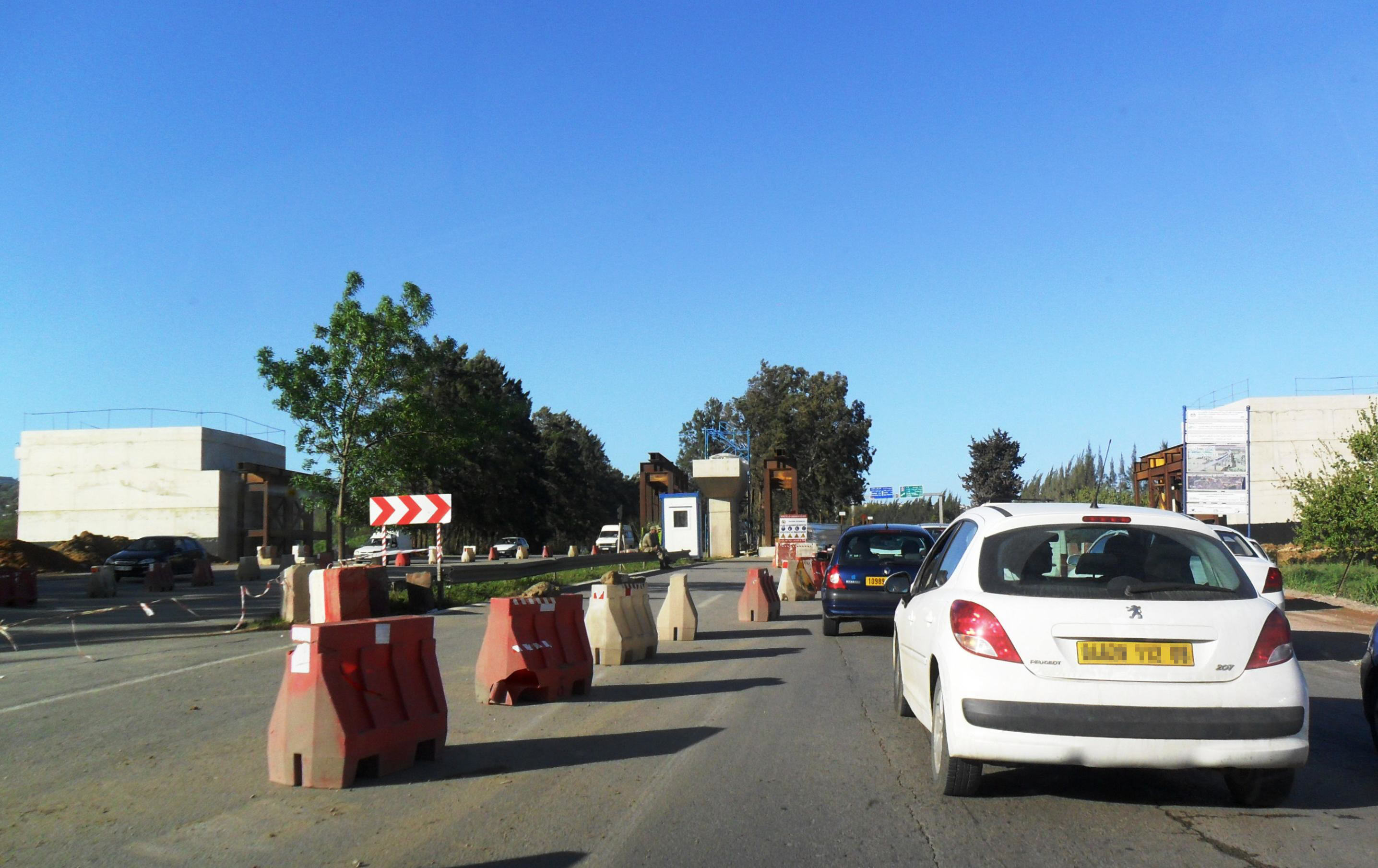
- Interactive map of Tessala El Merdja
- Coordinates: 36°38′07″N 2°56′49″E
- Country: Algeria
- Province: Algiers Province
- District: Birtouta District

Population (1998)
  - Total: 10,792
- Time zone: UTC+1 (CET)

Tessala El Merdja is a town and commune in Algiers Province, Algeria. As of 1998, the commune had a total population of 10,792.

== See also ==
- Communes of Algeria
