= Ouled Chebel =

Coordinates: 36°36′N 3°00′E

- Commune and town
- Interactive map of Ouled Chebel
- Country: Algeria
- Province: Algiers Province
- District: Birtouta District

Population (1998)
  - Total: 16,335
- Time zone: UTC+1 (CET)

Ouled Chebel is a town and commune in Algiers Province, Algeria. As of 2008, the commune had a total population of 20,006.

== See also ==
- Communes of Algeria
