= Sidi M'Hamed =

Sidi M'hamed
- Coordinates: 36°45′27″N 3°03′31″E
- Country: Algeria
- Province: Algiers
- Time zone: UTC+1 (West Africa Time)

Sidi M'Hamed (Arabic: سيدي أمحمد) is a municipality in Algiers Province, Algeria; formerly known as Mustapha. It is the seat of the district of the same name. Its municipal code is 1602 and postal code is 16014 and it has a population of 90,455 as of the 1998 census, which gives it 15 seats in the PMA.

The municipality is named after the founder of the Rahmaniyya Sufi order Sidi M'hamed Bou Qobrine.

== Notable people ==
- Paul Belmondo (1898–1982), French sculptor.
