= Liberté (Algeria) =

French language daily newspaper in Algeria (1992–2022)

- Type: Daily newspaper
- Format: Tabloid
- Owner: Issad Rebrab
- Founded: 1992
- Ceased publication: April 2022
- Language: French
- Headquarters: El Achour, Algeria

Liberté was a French-language newspaper published in Algeria from 1992 to 2022. Its head office was in El Achour, Algiers. The paper was privately owned and had an independent political stance. Its owner was an Algerian businessman Issad Rebrab. In August 2003 Liberté temporarily ceased publication due to its debt to state-run printing presses, but returned to availability shortly afterwards. The paper folded in April 2022.
