= Douéra =

Coordinates: 36°40′N 2°57′E

Douera
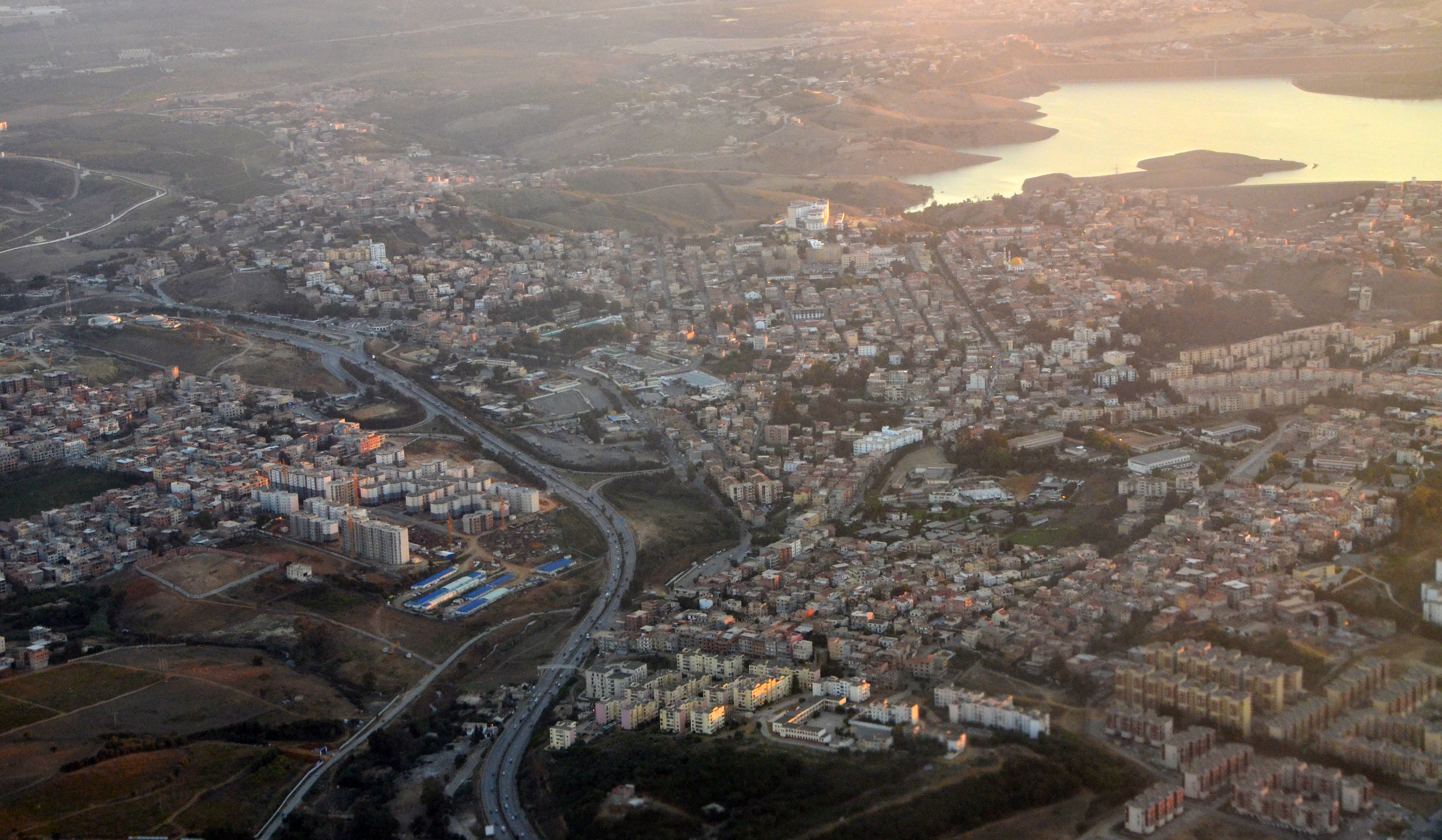
- Aerial photo of Douera
- Interactive map of Douera
- Country: Algeria
- Province: Algiers

Population (2008)
  - Total: 46,266
- Time zone: UTC+1 (West Africa Time)

Douéra is a suburb of the city of Algiers in northern Algeria.

== History ==
In 1830, Douéra was founded on a promontory overlooking the plain of Mitidja, particularly on the main road from Algiers to Blida. It was initially a camp and a military hospital established in place of a Turkish surveillance post called Bordj El Hamar. The rural commune of Douéra was officially established by decree on May 23, 1835. Spontaneous settlements began to form around the camp from that year onwards. Planned as a colonization village according to the Guyot plan, the village took time to populate and remained predominantly inhabited by military personnel tasked with protecting the colonization villages of Mitidja.

On November 30, 1843, a battle took place in Ouled Mendil between Arab troops and the 13th Infantry Regiment.

In 1850, Douéra became a municipality.

In 1894, Douéra lost more than a third of its territory with the creation of the commune of Saint Ferdinand (Souidania).

From 1923, Douéra became home to a major military transmission center, and was elevated to the status of a fully-fledged commune by decree on November 21, 1951. It became an important military center hosting two barracks (named Damrémont and Bugeaud) and regiments of the 19th Army Corps. In 1962, an important hospital-hospice with 2,000 beds was established there.

In 1984, a new territory was detached from Douéra to create the commune of Rahmania around the village formerly named Sainte Amélie.

== Sports ==
Currently under construction in Douéra is the Ali La Pointe Stadium, which will be the home stadium of the Ligue 1 football club MC Alger.
