= Birtouta District =

Coordinates: 36°38′59″N 2°59′56″E

Birtouta District دائرة بئر التوتة
- District
- Map of Algeria highlighting Algiers Province

- Map of Algiers Province highlighting Birtouta District
- Country: Algeria
- Province: Algiers
- District seat: Birtouta

Population (1998)
  - Total: 48,935
- Time zone: UTC+01 (CET)
- District code: 04
- Municipalities: 3

Birtouta is a district in Algiers Province, Algeria. It was named after its capital, Birtouta.

== Municipalities ==
The district is further divided into 3 municipalities:

- Birtouta
- Ouled Chebel
- Tessala El Merdja
