= Bab El Oued District =

Coordinates: 36.790703°N 3.049731°E

Bab El Oued District دائرة باب الوادي Daïra de Bab El Oued
- District
- Map of Algeria highlighting Algiers Province

- Map of Algiers Province highlighting Bab El Oued District
- Country: Algeria
- Province: Algiers
- District seat: Bab El Oued

Population (1998)
  - Total: 232,557
- Time zone: UTC+01 (CET)
- District code: 07
- Municipalities: 5

Bab El Oued is a district in Algiers Province, Algeria. It was named after its capital, Bab El Oued.

== Municipalities ==
The district is further divided into 4 municipalities:

- Bab El Oued
- Bologhine
- Casbah
- Oued Koriche
- Raïs Hamidou

== Notable people ==
- Rezki Zerarti, painter, artist
