= Algiers Province =

Province of Algeria

Algiers Province ولاية الجزائر ⵓⴳⴻⵣⴷⵓ ⵏ ⴷⵣⴰⵢⴻⵔ
- Province
- Map of Algeria highlighting Algiers
- Coordinates: 36°42′N 3°13′E
- Country: Algeria
- Capital: Algiers

Government
  - PPA president: Mohamed El-Habib Benboulaid (FLN)
  - Wāli: Mohamed Abdenour Rabehi

Area
  - Total: 1,190 km^{2} (460 sq mi)

Population (2023)
  - Total: 7,796,923
  - Density: 6,550/km^{2} (17,000/sq mi)
- Time zone: UTC+01 (CET)
- Postal code: 16000
- Area Code: +213 (0) 21
- ISO 3166 code: DZ-16
- Districts: 13
- Municipalities: 57

Algiers Province (Arabic: ولاية الجزائر, romanized: Wilāyat al-Jazāʾir, pronounced [wilaːjat ald͡ʒazaːʔir]; Berber languages: ⵓⴳⴻⵣⴷⵓ ⵏ ⴷⵣⴰⵢⴻⵔ, romanized: ugezdu n Dzayer, French: wilaya d'Alger) is a province (wilayah) in Algeria, named after its capital, Algiers, which is also the national capital. It is the most populated province of Algeria, and also the smallest by area.

In 1984, Boumerdès Province and Tipaza Province were carved out of its territory.

== Administrative divisions ==
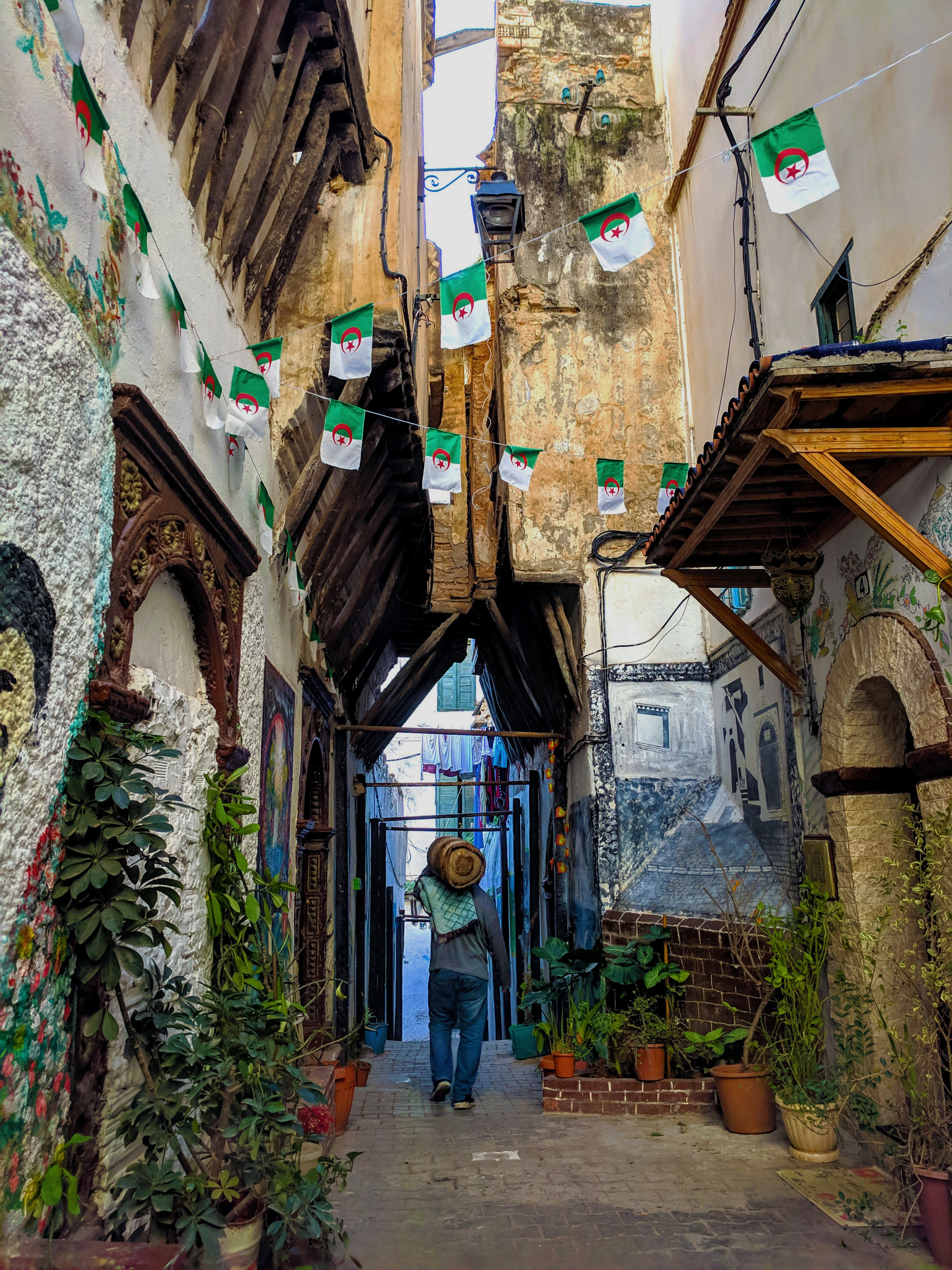
Casbah of Algiers

Algiers province is coincident with the city of Algiers, and is divided into 13 districts, in turn subdivided into 57 communes or municipalities.

=== Districts ===
The districts, listed according to official numbering (from west to east), are:

1. Zéralda
2. Chéraga
3. Draria
4. Bir Mourad Raïs
5. Birtouta
6. Bouzaréah
7. Bab El Oued

8. Sidi M'Hamed
9. Hussein Dey
10. El Harrach
11. Baraki
12. Dar El Beïda
13. Rouïba

The 13 districts of Algiers Province

=== Communes ===
The communes are:

District	Commune	Arabic
Bab El Oued District	Bab El Oued	باب الواد
Bab El Oued District	Bologhine	بولوغين
Bab El Oued District	Casbah	قصبة
Bab El Oued District	Oued Koreiche	واد قريش
Bab El Oued District	Rais Hamidou	الرايس حميدو
Baraki District	Baraki	براقي
Baraki District	Les Eucalyptus	کالیتوس
Baraki District	Sidi Moussa	سيدي موسى
Bir Mourad Raïs District	Bir Mourad Raïs	بير مراد رايس
Bir Mourad Raïs District	Birkhadem	بئر خادم
Bir Mourad Raïs District	Djasr Kasentina	جسر قسنطينة
Bir Mourad Raïs District	Hydra	حيدرة
Bir Mourad Raïs District	Saoula	السحاولة
Birtouta District	Birtouta	بئر توتة
Birtouta District	Ouled Chebel	أولاد شبل
Birtouta District	Tessala El Merdja	تسالة المرجة
Bouzaréah District	Ben Aknoun	بن عكنون
Bouzaréah District	Béni Messous	بني مسوس
Bouzaréah District	Bouzaréah	بوزريعة
Bouzaréah District	El Biar	الأبيار
Chéraga District	Aïn Bénian	عين البنيان
Chéraga District	Chéraga	الشراقة
Chéraga District	Dély Ibrahim	دالي إبراهيم
Chéraga District	Hammamet	الحمامات
Chéraga District	Ouled Fayet	أولاد فايت
Sidi M'Hamed District	Alger Centre	الجزائر الوسطى
Sidi M'Hamed District	El Madania	المدنية
Sidi M'Hamed District	El Mouradia	المرادية
Sidi M'Hamed District	Sidi M'Hamed	سيدي امحمد

1. Aïn Taya (Ain Taya Forest)
2. Bab El Oued
3. Bab Ezzouar
4. Baba Hassen
5. Bachdjerrah (Bach Djerrah)
6. Bologhine (Bouloghine)
7. Bordj El Bahri
8. Bordj El Kiffan (Bordj El Kifan)
9. Bourouba
10. Casbah
11. Dar El Beïda
12. Douéra
13. Draria
14. El Achour
15. El Harrach
16. El Magharia
17. El Marsa (El-Marsa Forest)
18. H'raoua
19. Hussein Dey
20. Khraïcia
21. Kouba
22. Mahelma
23. Mahelma Forest
24. Mohamed Belouizdad
25. Mohammedia
26. Oued Koriche
27. Oued Smar
28. Rahmania
29. Raïs Hamidou
30. Reghaïa
31. Rouïba
32. Souidania
33. Staouéli
34. Zéralda (Zeralda Forest)

== Neighbourhoods ==
The neighbourhoods, listed alphabetically, are:

1. Baba Ali
2. Beau-Fraisier
3. Casbah of Algiers
4. Chevalley
5. Cité 1er Novembre 1954
6. Cité Yahia Boushaki
7. Club des Pins
8. Diar el Mahçoul
9. El Annasser
10. El Hamiz
11. Hamma
12. La Glacière
13. Les Dunes
14. Les Fusillés
15. Moretti
16. Riadh El Feth
17. Saïd Hamdine
18. Sidi Abdellah
19. Sidi Yahia
20. Tamentfoust

== History ==
=== Ottoman Algeria ===
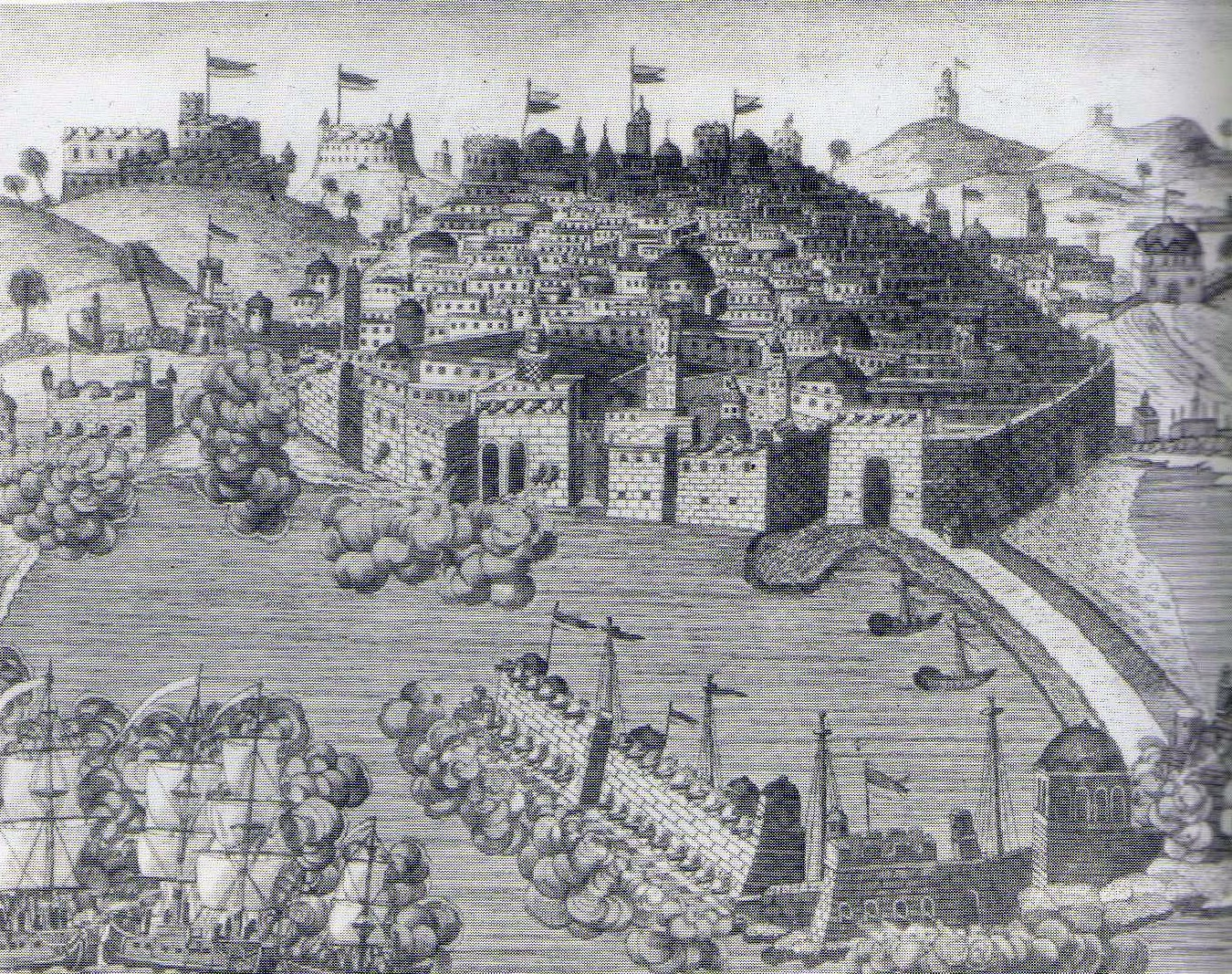
Bombardment of Algiers by the fleet of Admiral Duquesne in 1682

- Bombardment of Algiers (1682)
- Bombardment of Algiers (1683)

=== French conquest ===
- Invasion of Algiers (14 June 1830)
- Battle of Staouéli (18 June 1830)
- Massacre of El Ouffia (6 April 1832)
- First Raid on Reghaïa (8 May 1837)

=== Independence Revolution ===
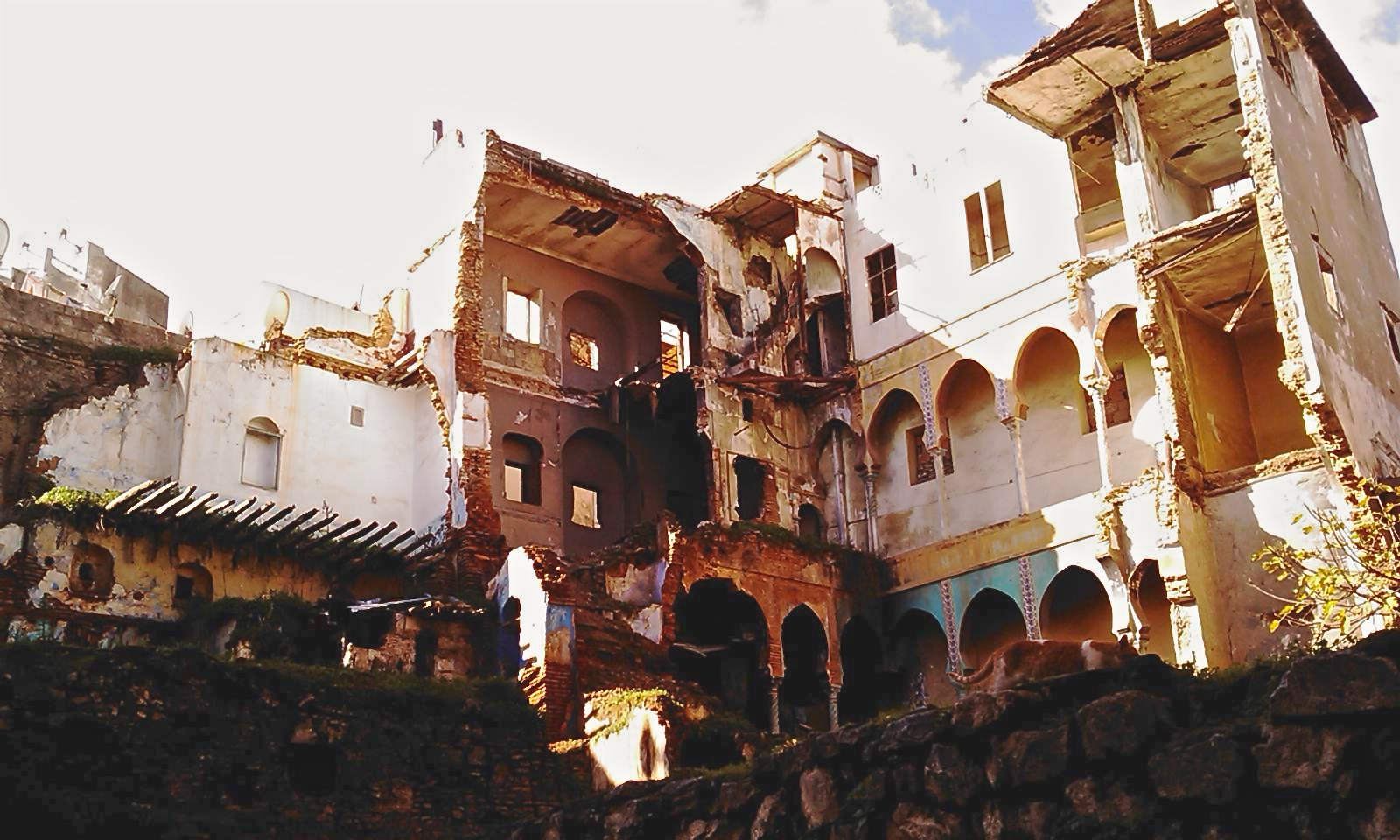
The remains during the Battle of Algiers of a house in the Casbah of Algiers destroyed in the explosion that killed Ali la Pointe.

- Battle of Algiers (1956–57)
- Battle of Bab El Oued (23 March 1962)
- Villa Susini

=== Salafist terrorism ===
- List of terrorist incidents in 2007
  - 2007 Algiers bombings (11 April 2007)
  - 2007 Algiers bombings (11 December 2007)

== Religion ==
=== Mosques ===
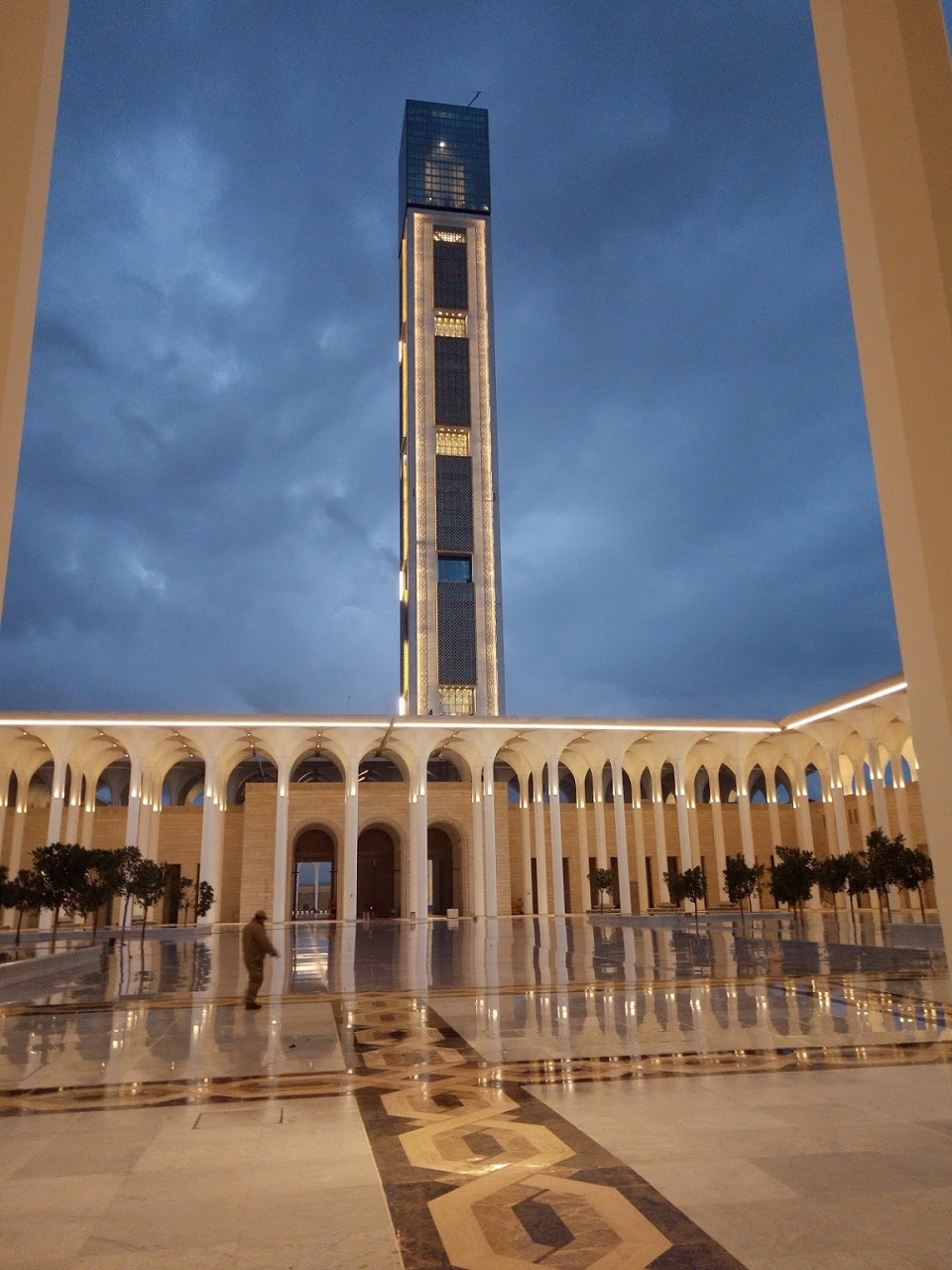
Djamaa el Djazaïr

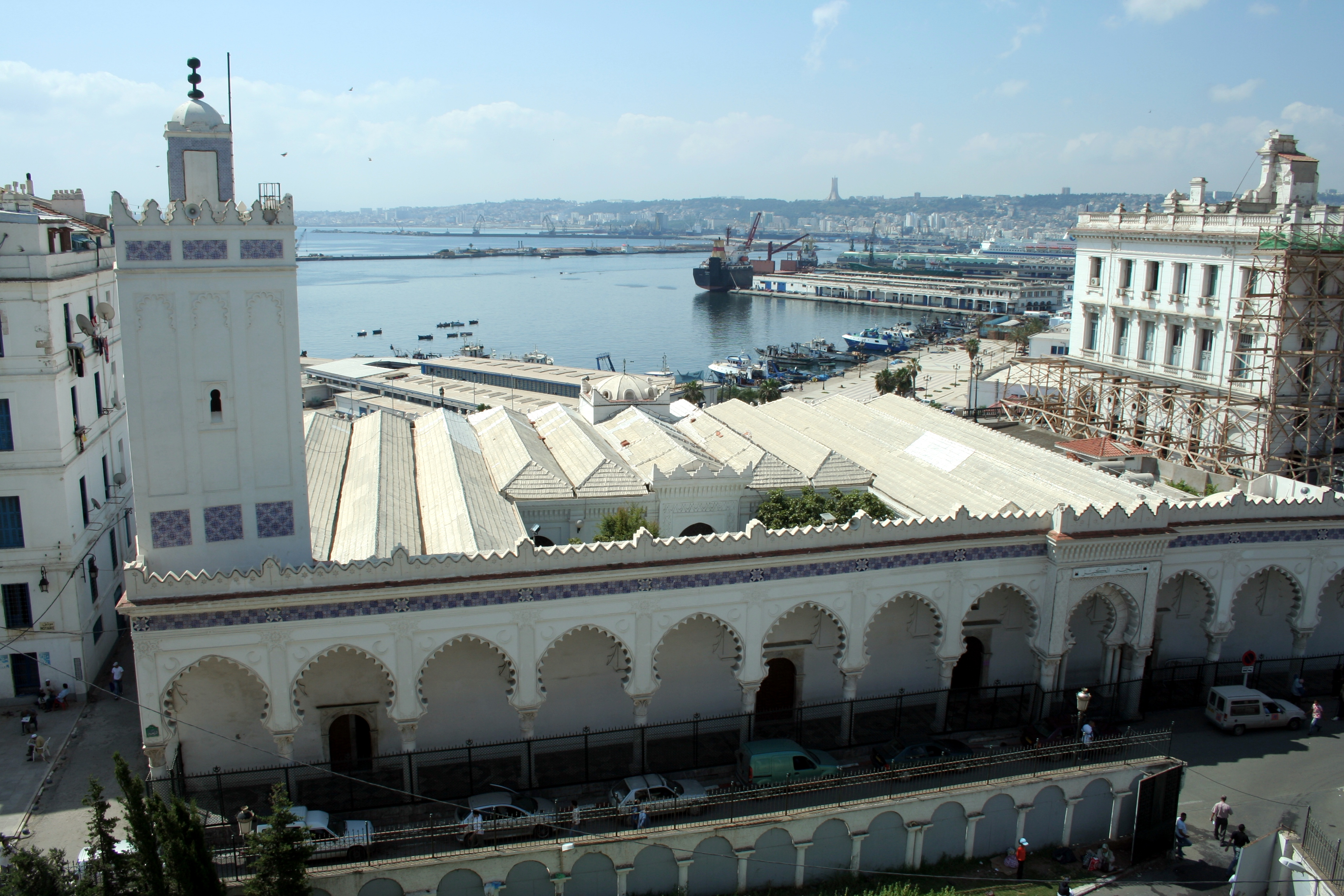
Djamaa el Kebir

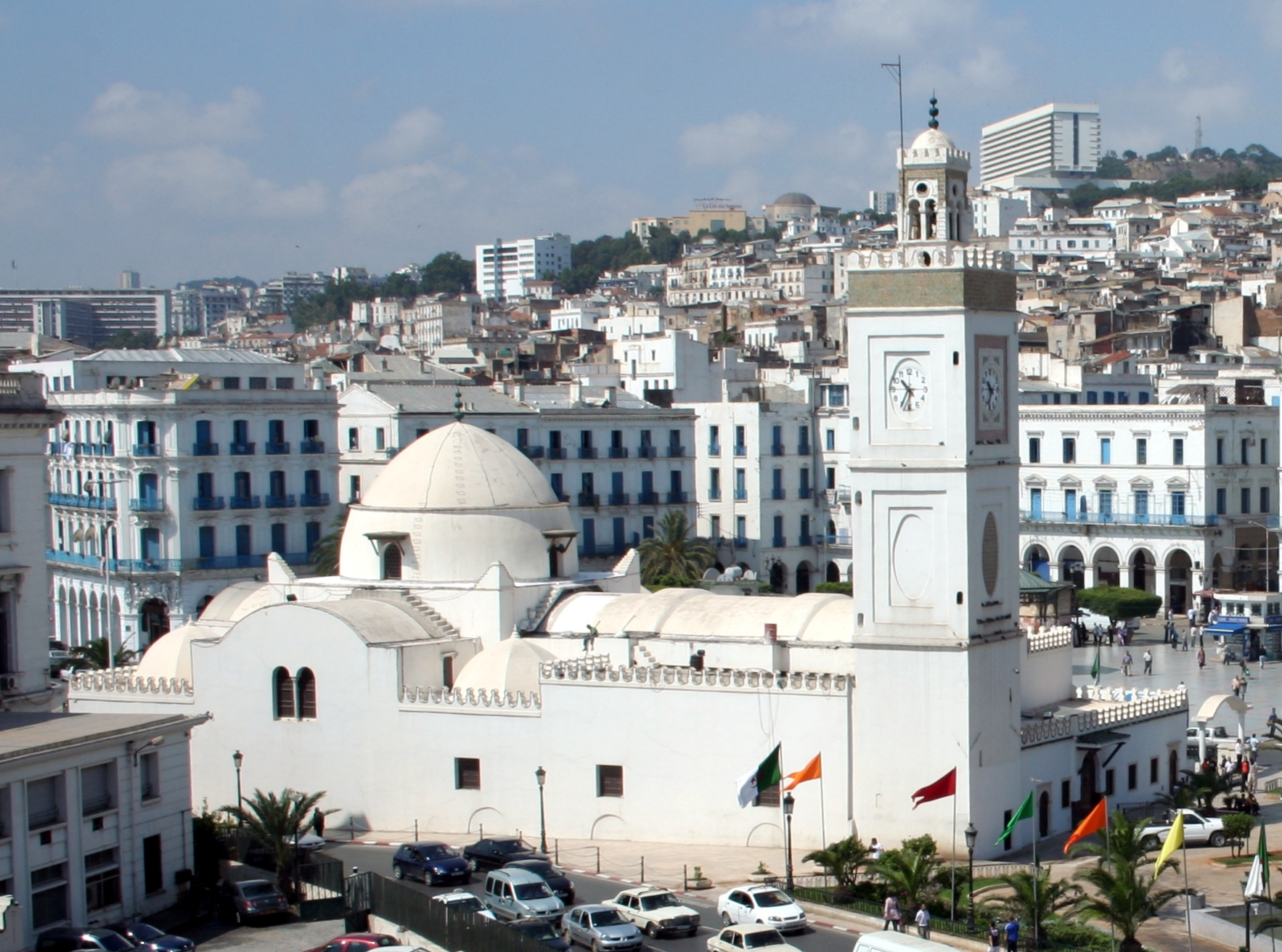
Djamaa el Djedid

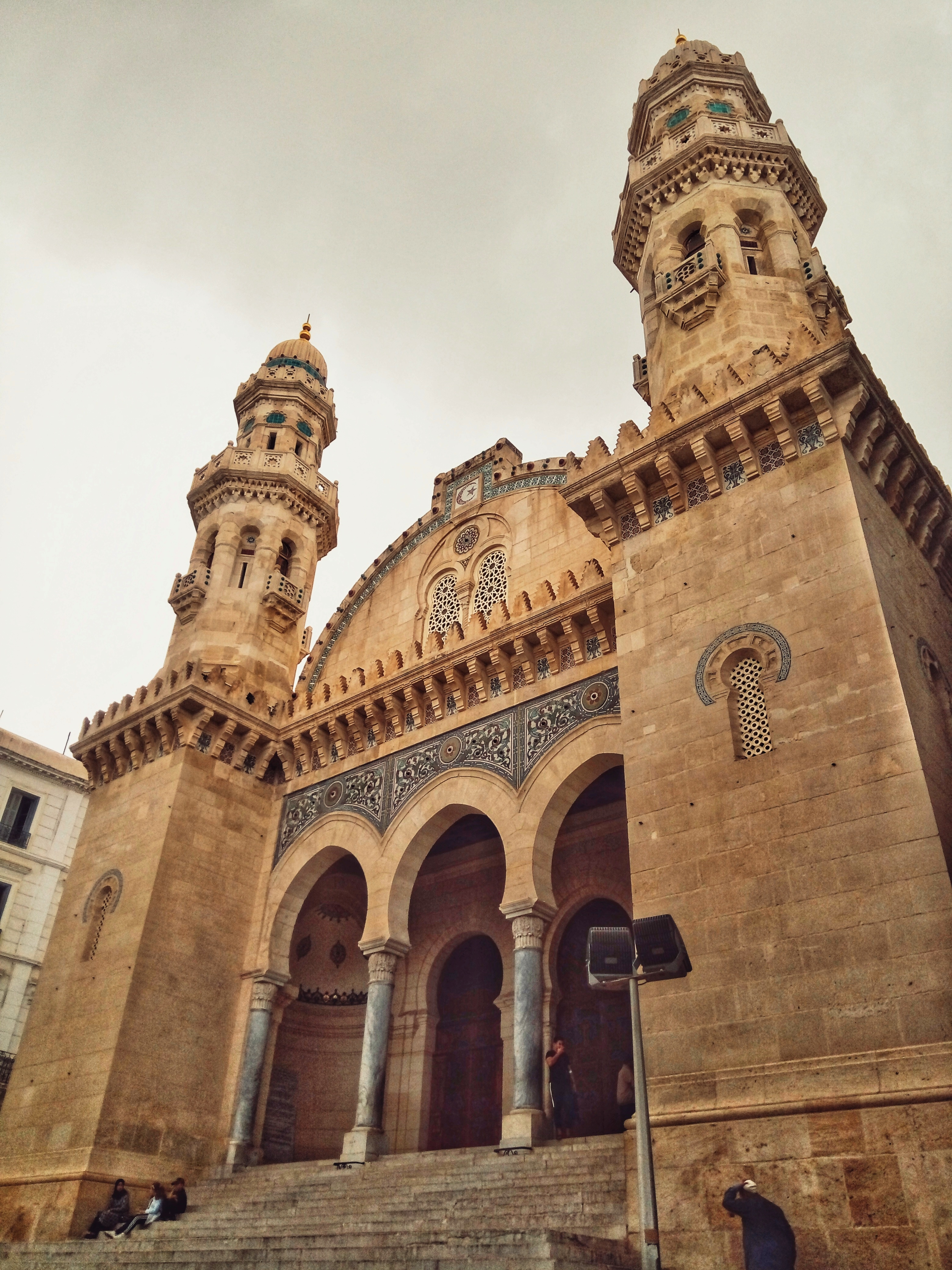
Ketchaoua Mosque

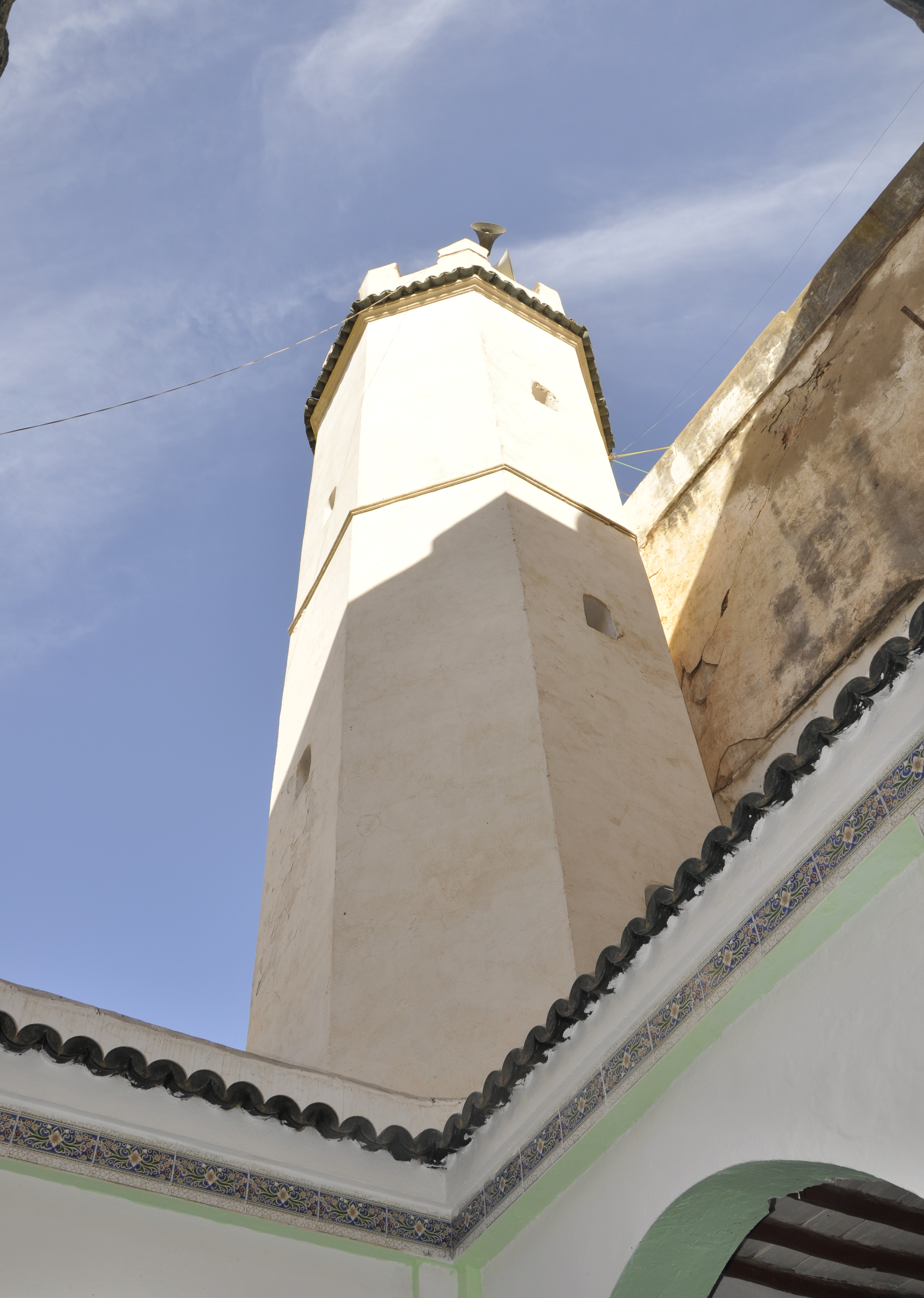
Safir Mosque

=== Cemeteries ===
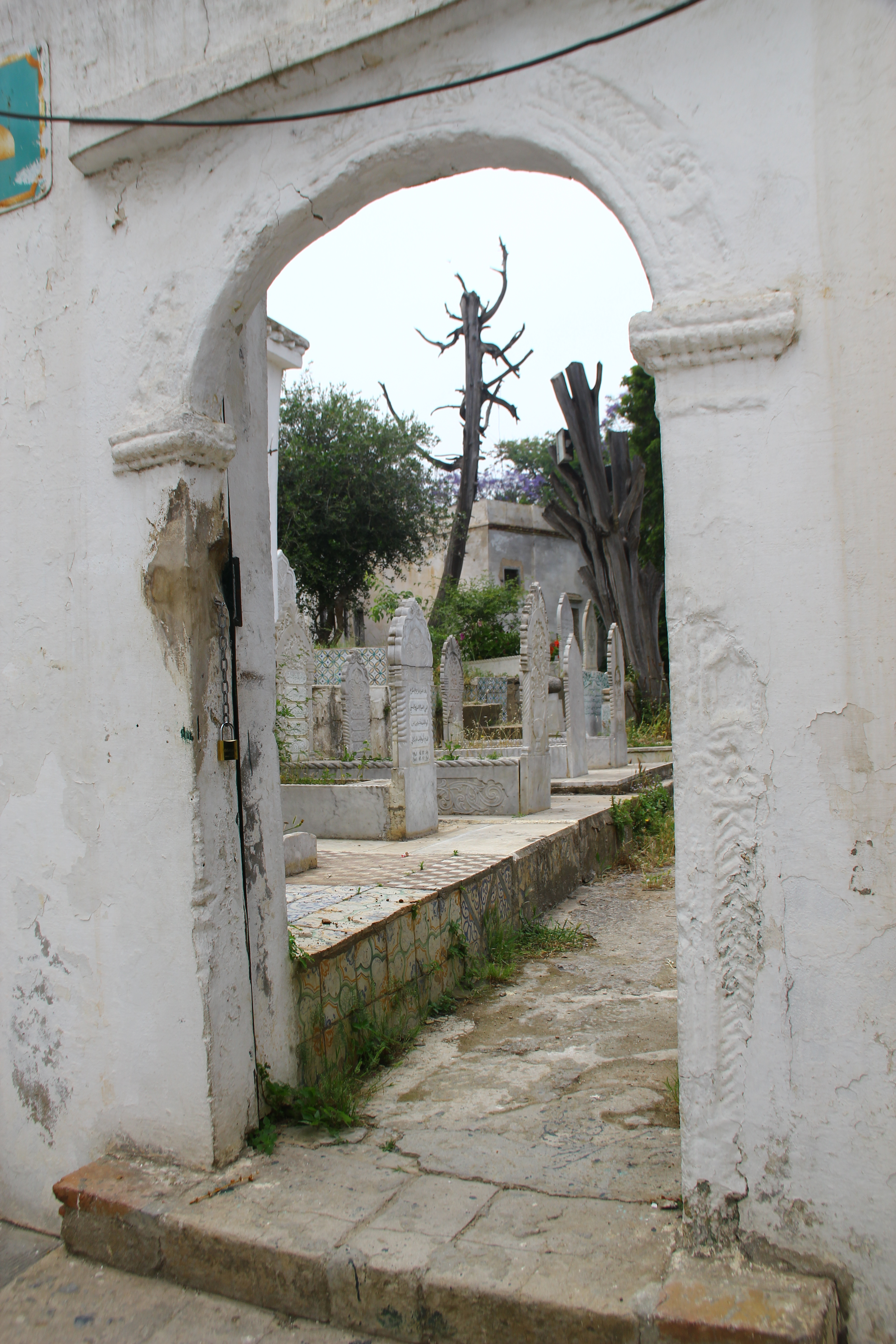
Thaalibia Cemetery

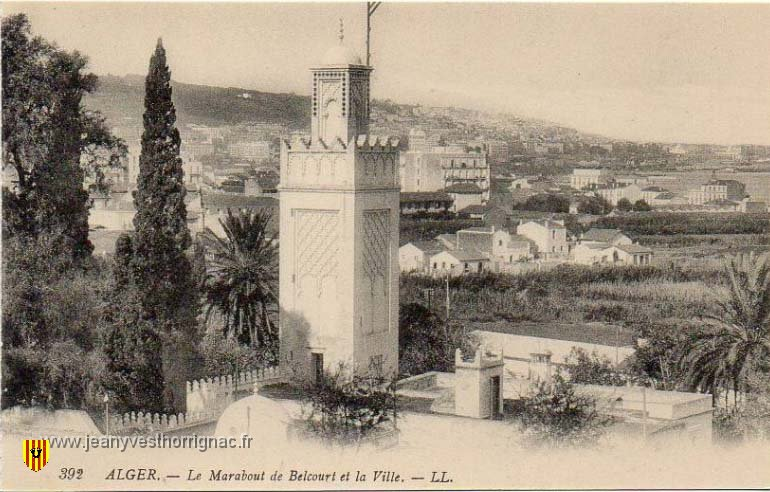
Sidi M'hamed Bou Qobrine Cemetery

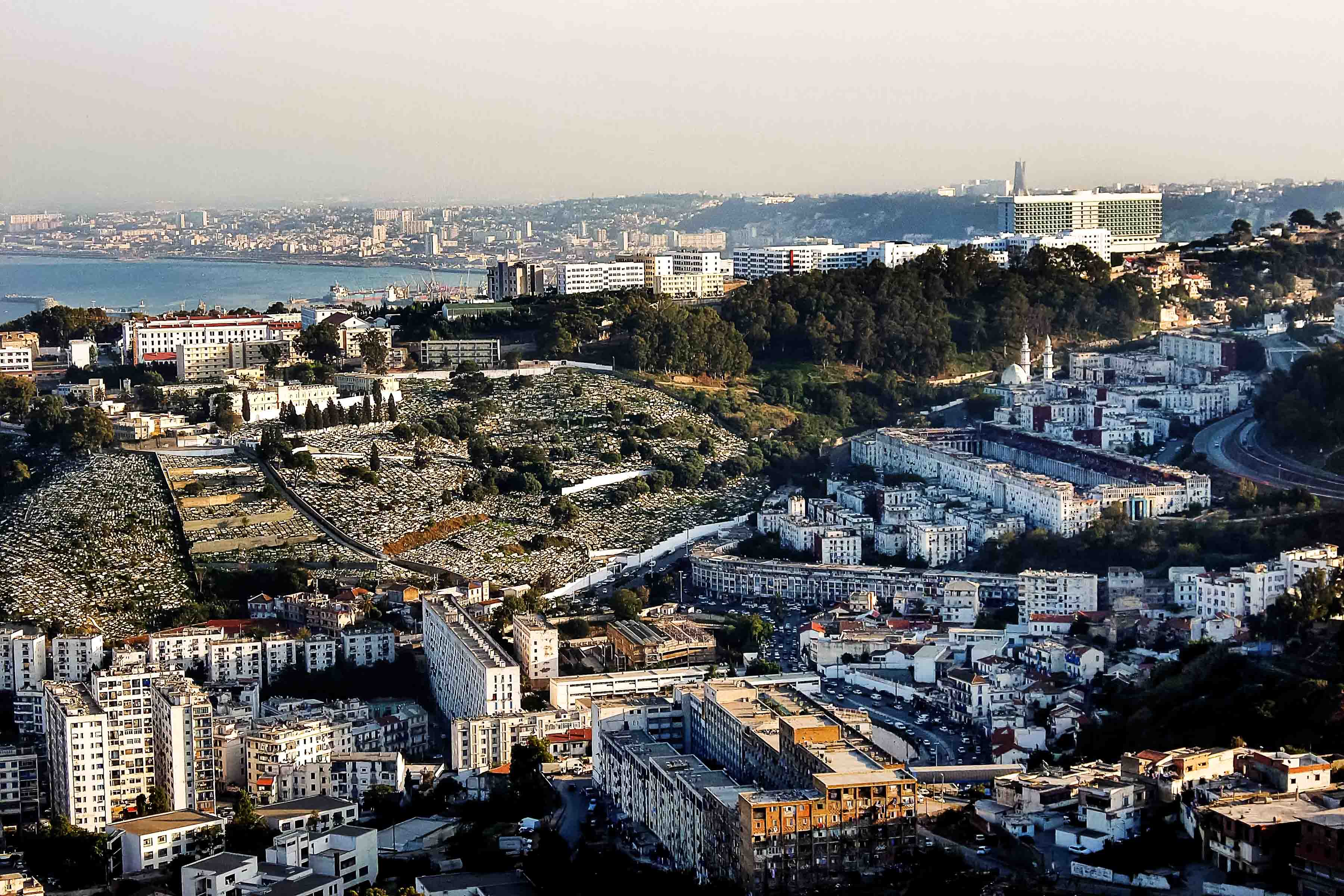
El Kettar Cemetery

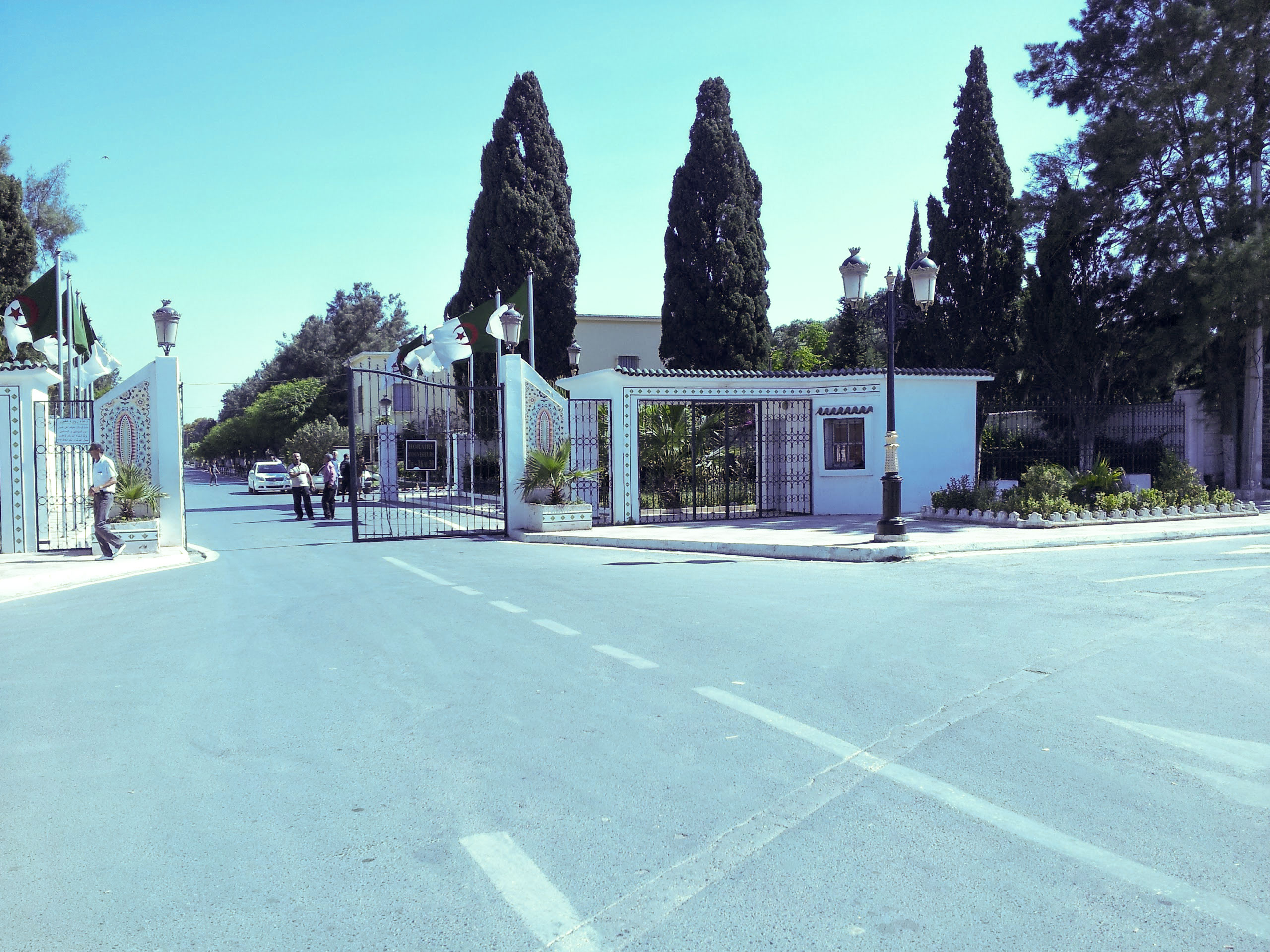
El Alia Cemetery

=== Zawiyas ===
- Zawiya Thaalibia in Algiers.
- Zawiya of Sidi M'hamed Bou Qobrine in Algiers.
- Zawiya of Sidi Saadi in Algiers.
- Zawiya of Sidi Amar in Algiers.
- Zawiya Belkaïdia in Algiers.

== Education ==
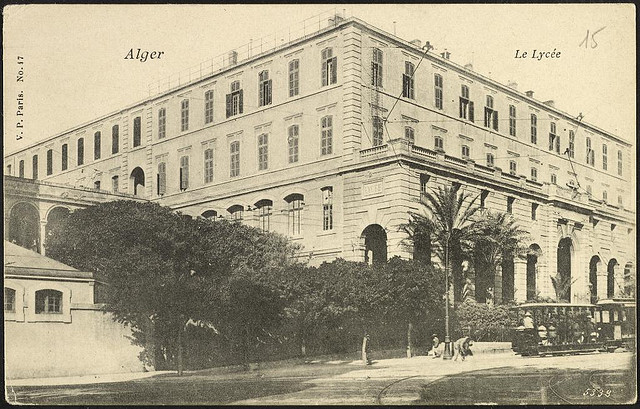
Emir Abdelkader Lyceum

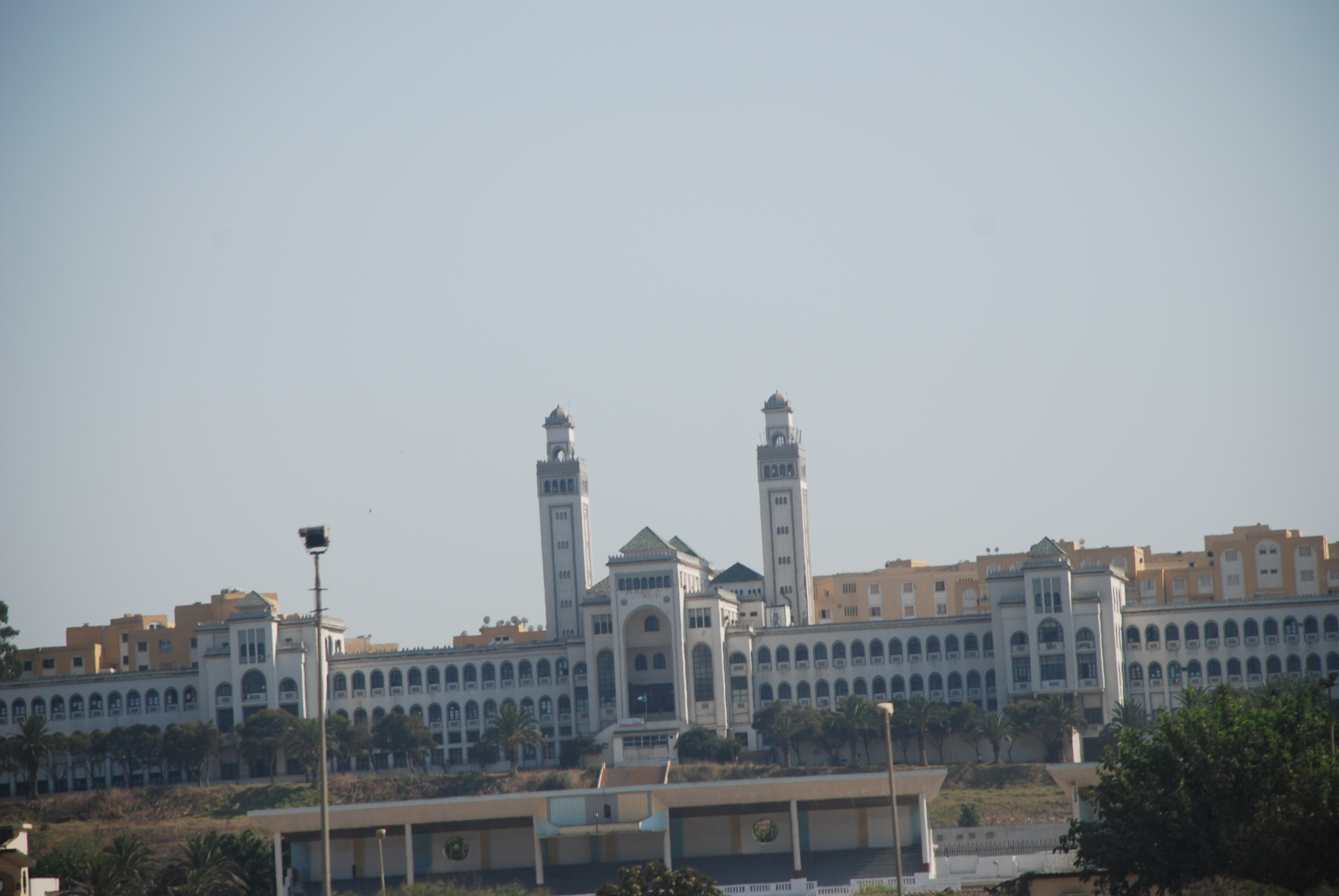
College of Islamic Sciences in Algiers

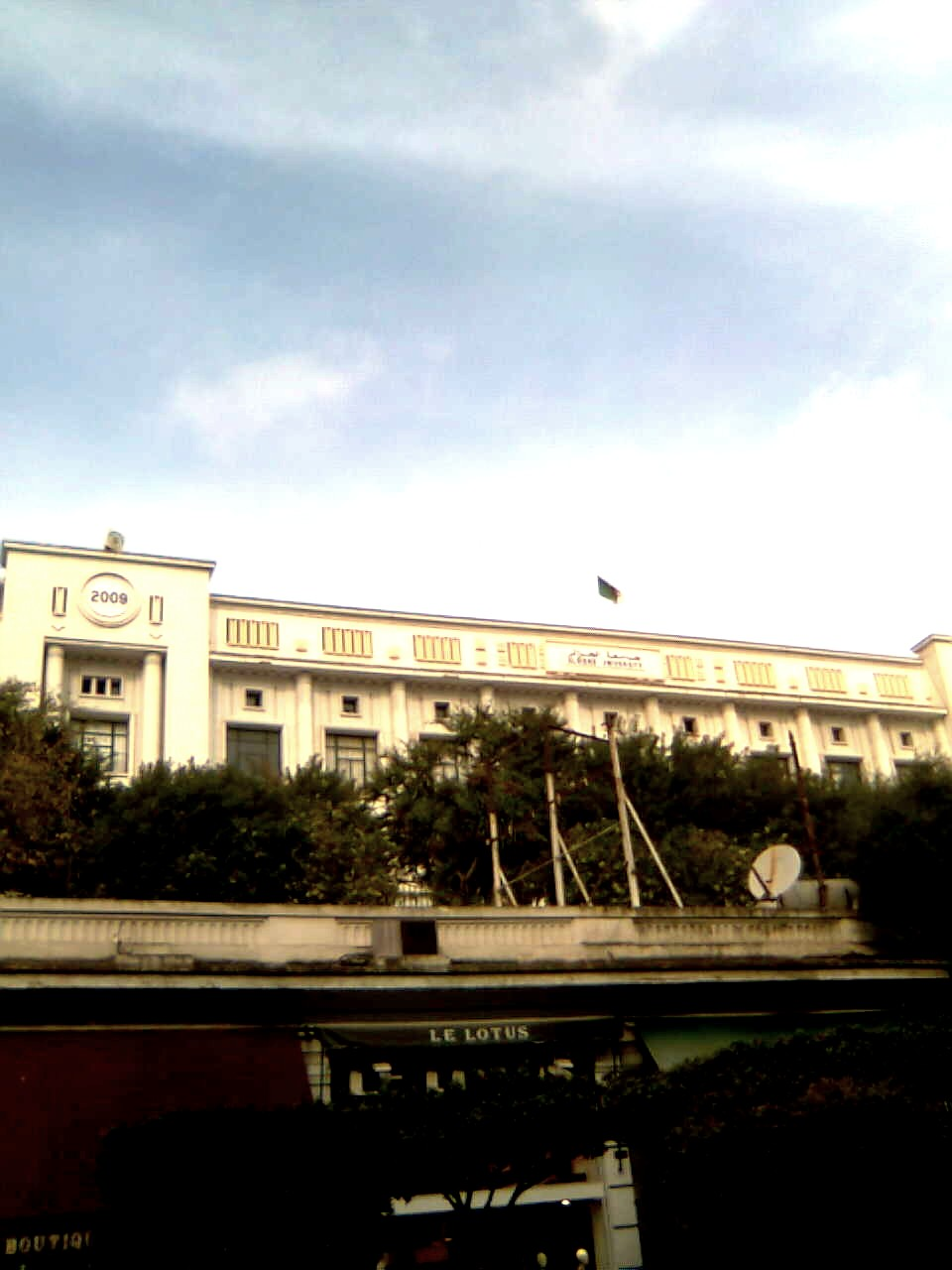
Algiers 1 University

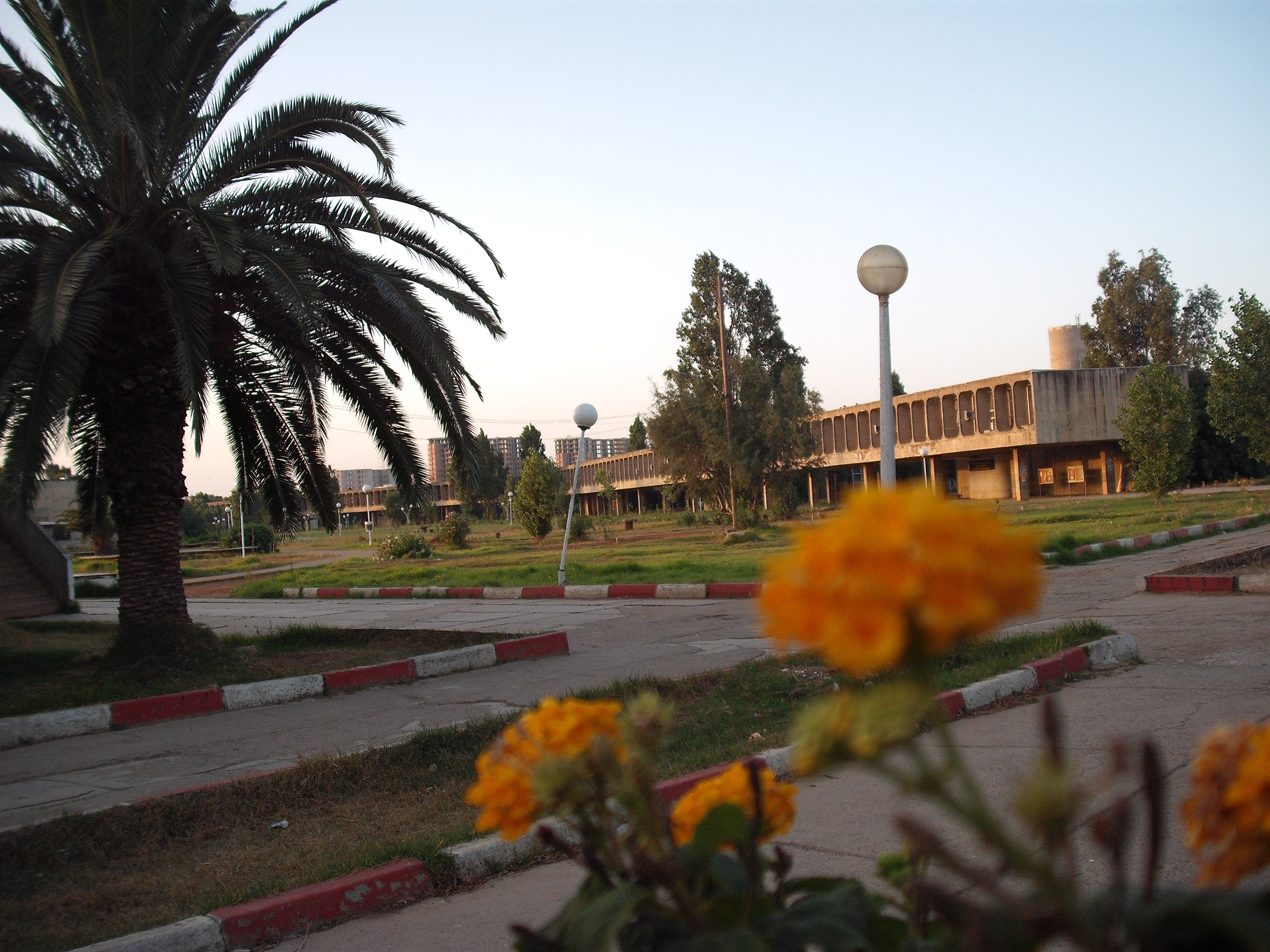
University of Science and Technology Houari Boumédiène

== Demographics ==
The population of the province of Algiers increased going from 2,561,992 in 1998 to 2,988,145 in 2008:

Historical population
Year	1998	2008
Pop.	2,561,992	2,988,145
±%	—	+16.6%

Communes	Population	Growth rate between 1998 and 2008
Bordj El Kiffan	151,950	▲4.0 %
Djasr Kasentina	133,247	▲5.0 %
Baraki	116,375	▲2.1 %
Les Eucalyptus	116,107	▲1.9 %
Kouba	104,708	▼ −0.1 %
Bab Ezzouar	96,597	▲0.5 %
Bachdjarah	93,289	▲0.4 %
Reghaia	85,452	▲2.6 %
Bouzaréah	83,797	▲2.0 %
Chéraga	80,824	▲3.0 %
Dar El Beïda	80,033	▲6.1 %
Birkhadem	77,749	▲3.6 %
Alger-Centre	75,541	▼ −2.4 %
Bourouba	71,661	▼ −0.8 %
Ain Benian	68,354	▲2.8 %
Sidi M'Hamed	67,873	▼ −2.9 %
Bab El Oued	64,732	▼ −3.0 %
Mohammadia	62,543	▲4.1 %
Rouïba	61,984	▲2.2 %
Douéra	56,998	▲3.2 %
Bordj El bahri	52,816	▲6.7 %
Zeralda	51,552	▲4.6 %
El Harrach	48,869	▲0.1 %
Staouéli	47,664	▲2.1 %
El Biar	47,332	▼ −1.1 %
Oued Koreiche	46,182	▼ −1.5 %
Bir Mourad Raïs	45,345	▲0.5 %
Draria	44,141	▲6.8 %
Hamma Annassers	44,050	▼ −3.0 %
Bologhine	43,835	▲0.1 %
Saoula	41,690	▲2.9 %
El Achour	41,070	▲7.9 %
Sidi Moussa	40,750	▲3.9 %
Hussein Dey	40,698	▼ −2.1 %
El Madania	40,301	▼ −2.4 %
Casbah	36,762	▼ −3.2 %
Béni Messous	36,191	▲7.7 %
Dély Ibrahim	35,230	▲1.5 %
Ain Taya	34,501	▲1.6 %
Oued Smar	32,062	▲4.2 %
El Magharia	31,453	▲0.3 %
Hydra	31,133	▼ −1.4 %
Birtouta	30,575	▲3.5 %
Rais Hamidou	28,451	▲2.9 %
Khraicia	27,910	▲4.8 %
Ouled Fayet	27,593	▲6.3 %
Harraoua	27,565	▲4.3 %
Hammamet	23,990	▲2.1 %
Baba Hassen	23,756	▲5.7 %
El Mouradia	22,813	▼ −2.6 %
Mahelma	20,758	▲3.5 %
Ouled Chebel	20,006	▲2.1 %
Ben Aknoun	18,838	▼ −0.3 %
Souidania	17,105	▲4.0 %
Tessala El Merdja	15,847	▲4.0 %
El Mersa	12,100	▲3.3 %
Rahmania	7,396	▲2.6 %
