= Béni Messous =

Coordinates: 36°47′N 2°59′E

Beni Messous بني مسوس
- Commune
- Interactive map of Beni Messous
- Country: Algeria
- Province: Algiers

Area
  - Total: 7.83 km^{2} (3.02 sq mi)

Population (2008)
  - Total: 36,191
  - Density: 4,622.1/km^{2} (11,971/sq mi)
- Time zone: UTC+1 (West Africa Time)
- Postal code: 16044

Beni Messous (Arabic: بني مسوس) is a commune in Algiers Province and suburb of the city of Algiers in northern Algeria. As of the 2008 census, the commune had a population of 36,191.
