= Khraïcia =

Coordinates: 36°41′N 2°59′E

Khraicia
- Interactive map of Khraicia
- Country: Algeria
- Province: Algiers
- Time zone: UTC+1 (West Africa Time)

Khraicia is a suburb of the city of Algiers in northern Algeria.
