= Souidania =

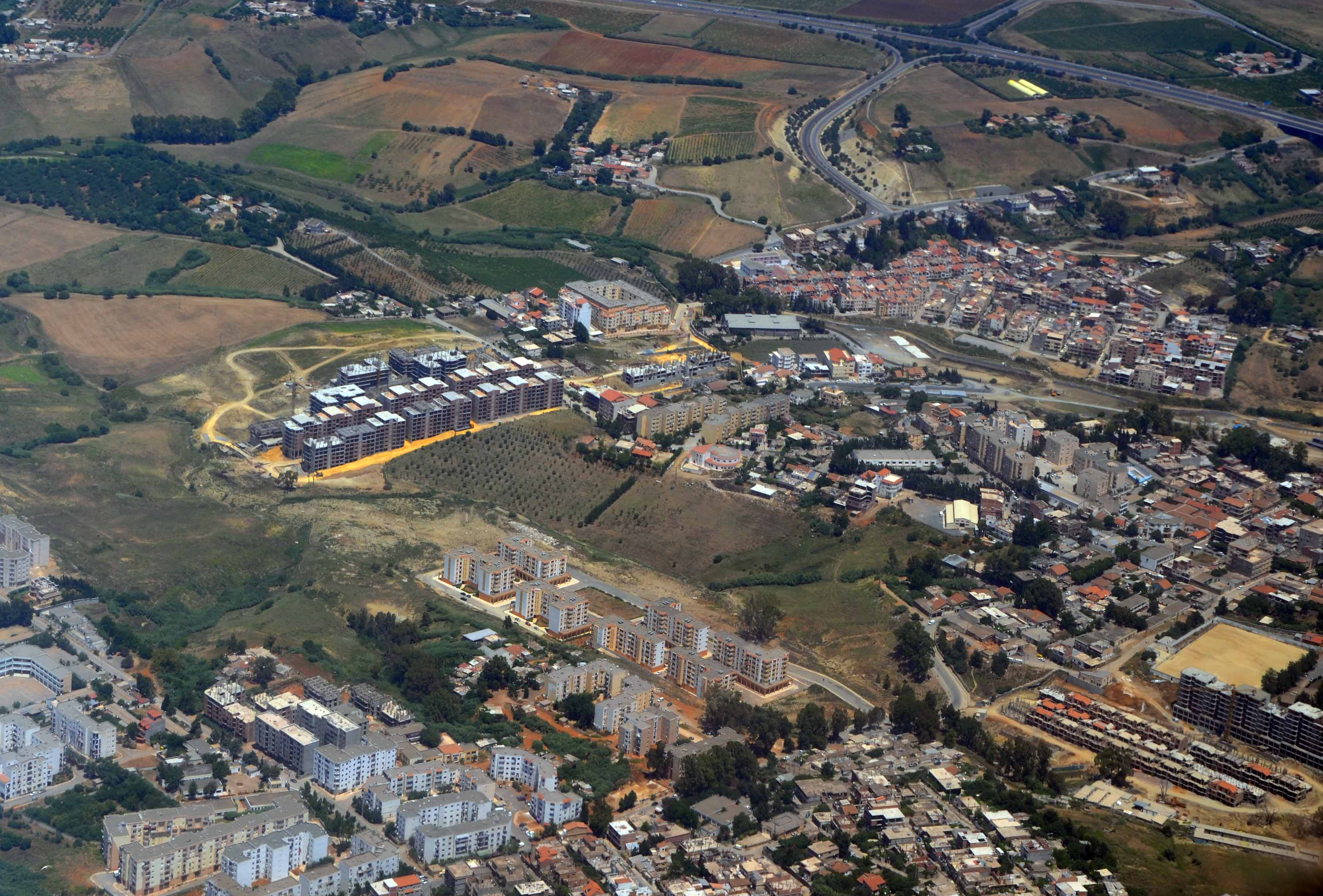
- Aerial view of Souidania in 2013
- Interactive map of Souidania
- Coordinates: 36°42′N 2°55′E
- Country: Algeria
- Province: Algiers
- Time zone: UTC+1 (West Africa Time)

Souidania, or Saint Ferdinand, is a suburb of the city of Algiers in northern Algeria.

The town used to be the haouch (farm) Boukandarou on the road between Mahelma and Ouled Fayet. The plan Guyot of 1842 turned the farm into a European settlement. It was confiscated in 1843 and constituted as a town in 1844.
