= El Achour =

Coordinates: 36°44′02″N 2°59′31″E

- Interactive map of El Achour
- Country: Algeria
- Province: Algiers
- Time zone: UTC+1 (West Africa Time)

El Achour is a suburb of the city of Algiers in northern Algeria.

The head office of the French-language newspaper Liberté is in El Achour.

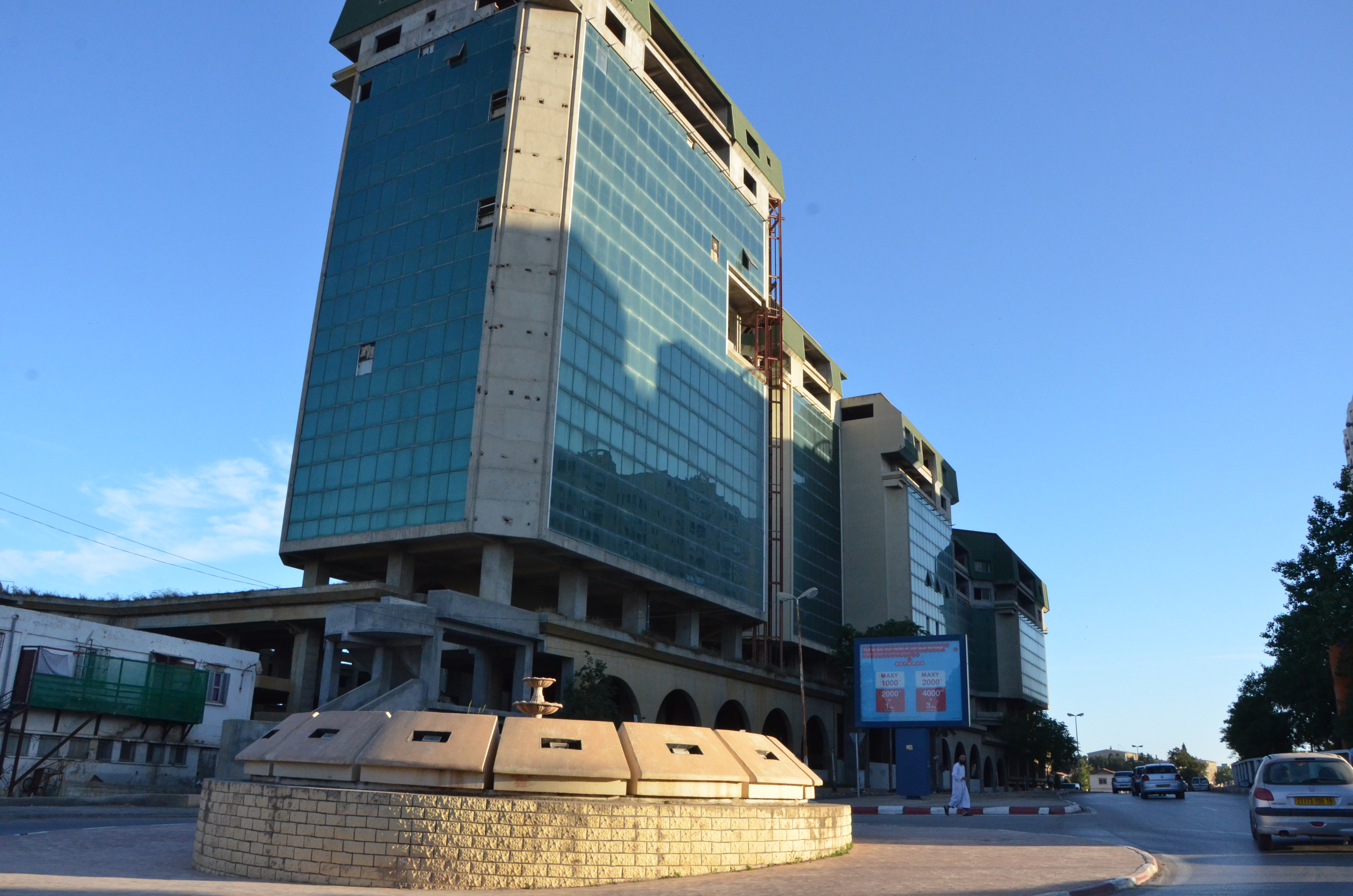
El Achour
