= Birtouta =

Coordinates: 36°39′N 3°00′E

Birtouta بئر توتة
- Commune and town

- Location in Algeria
- Country: Algeria
- Province: Algiers Province
- District: Birtouta District

Area
  - Land: 10.55 sq mi (27.32 km^{2})

Population (2008)
  - Total: 30,575
  - Density: 2,898/sq mi (1,119.1/km^{2})
- Time zone: UTC+1 (CET)

Birtouta (Arabic: بئر توتة) is a town and commune in Algiers Province, Algeria. As of 2008, the commune had a total population of 30,575.

== See also ==
- Communes of Algeria
