= Hussein Dey District =

Coordinates: 36.744318°N 3.092008°E

Hussein Dey District دائرة حسين داي
- District
- Map of Algeria highlighting Algiers Province

- Map of Algiers Province highlighting Hussein Dey District
- Country: Algeria
- Province: Algiers
- District seat: Hussein Dey

Population (1998)
  - Total: 244,879
- Time zone: UTC+01 (CET)
- District code: 08
- Municipalities: 4

Hussein Dey is a district in Algiers Province, Algeria. It was named after the Ottoman provincial ruler of the Regency of Algiers.

He had installed his country house near the beaches of the suburb of Algiers.Located on the seafront, between the Jardin d’essai, Maison Carree Kouba. Hussein Dey had several counties in its periphery: Leveilley, Brossette, Bel Air, Panorama, Côte-Blanche, Côte-Rouge, and Lafarge.

== Municipalities ==
The district is further divided into 4 municipalities:

- Hussein Dey
- Kouba
- El Magharia
- Belouzidad

== Notable people ==
Known personalities from the area include:

- Sidi M'hamed Bou Qobrine, theologian and Sufi
- Brahim Boushaki, theologian and Sufi
- Mohamed Aïchaoui, journalist, militant activist, politician
- Mohamed Arkab, engineer, politician
- Mohamed Belouizdad, militant activist, politician
- Mohamed Missouri, boxer and coach
- Hocine Yahi, football player
- Rabah Madjer, football player
