= Draria =

Coordinates: 36°44′N 3°00′E

- Country: Algeria
- Province: Algiers
- Time zone: UTC+1 (West Africa Time)

Draria is a suburb of the city of Algiers in northern Algeria.
