= Chéraga =

Coordinates: 36°46′N 2°57′E

Chéraga الشراقة
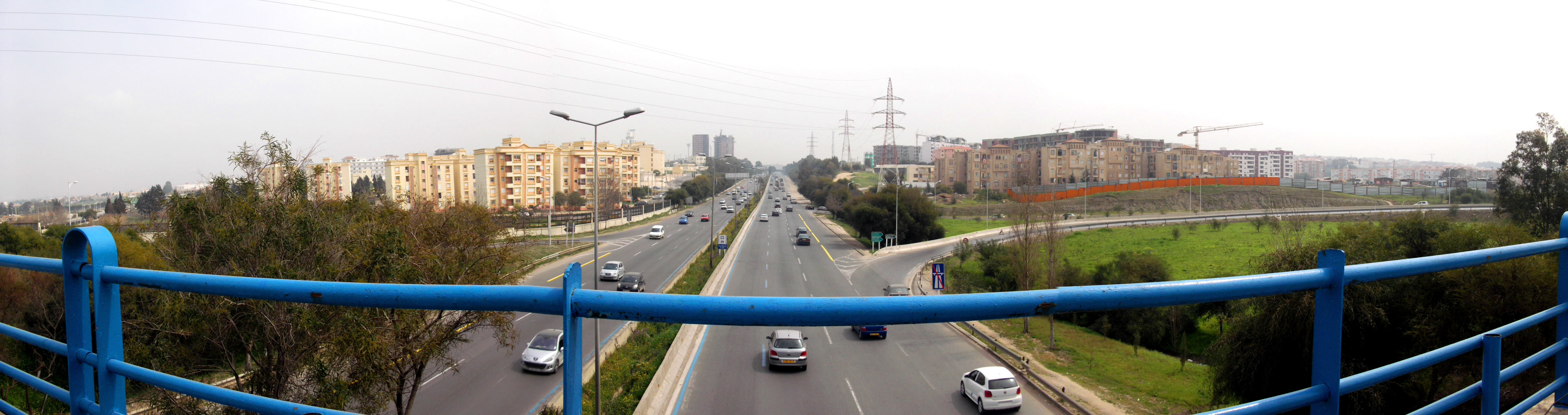

- Country: Algeria
- Province: Algiers
- Time zone: UTC+1 (West Africa Time)

Chéraga (Arabic: الشراقة, ash-Shirāqa) is a suburb of the city of Algiers in northern Algeria.

The indoor sporting arena La Coupole d'Alger Arena is located here.
