= Zéralda =

Zeralda
- Commune
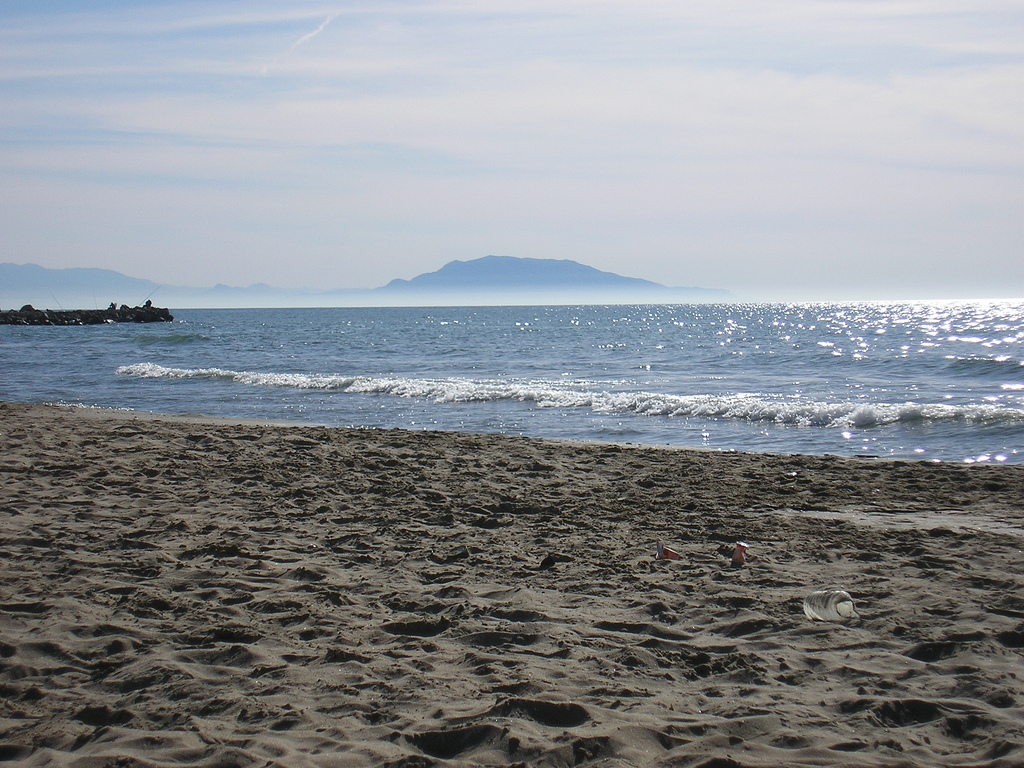

- Location within Algeria
- Coordinates: 36°43′N 2°51′E
- Country: Algeria
- Province: Algiers

Area
  - Total: 29.69 km^{2} (11.46 sq mi)

Population (2008)
  - Total: 51,552
  - Density: 1,736/km^{2} (4,500/sq mi)
- Time zone: UTC+1 (West Africa Time)

Zéralda (French pronunciation: [zeʁalda]; Arabic: زرالدة, zarālda) or Zeralda, is a commune in the province of Algiers, Algeria.

== Notable people ==
- Mohamed Belhocine, Algerian medical scientist, professor of internal medicine and epidemiology.
- Abdelaziz Bouteflika, fifth President of Algeria (1999–2019).
