= Rahmania =

- Interactive map of Rahmania
- Coordinates: 36°40′51″N 2°54′23″E
- Country: Algeria
- Province: Algiers
- Time zone: UTC+1 (West Africa Time)

Rahmania is a suburb of the city of Algiers in northern Algeria.
