= Mahelma =

Coordinates: 36°41′N 2°53′E

Maaelma
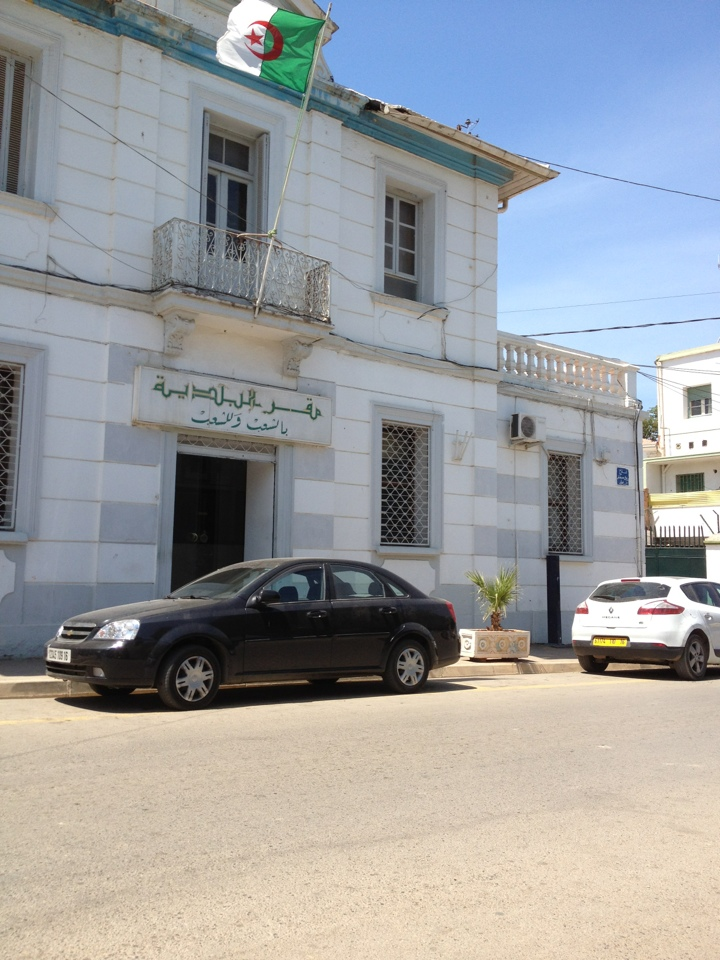
- Nicknames: Maaelma, Alger, Algeria
- Interactive map of Maaelma
- Country: Algeria
- Province: Algiers
- Time zone: UTC+1 (West Africa Time)

Mahelma is a suburb of the city of Algiers in northern Algeria.

== Notable people ==
- Hamoud Ameur - Long-distance runner who competed at the 1960 Summer Olympics
