= El-Marsa Forest =

Forest in El-Marsa, Algiers

- Location within Algeria
- Interactive map of El-Marsa Forest

Geography
- Location: Algeria
- Coordinates: 36°48′40″N 3°14′50″E
- Elevation: 50 m (160 ft)
- Area: 9.5 acres (3.8 ha)

El-Marsa Forest, also referred to as Forest Roussegonia or Aguellou n'Tamentfoust, is a forest situated within the commune of El-Marsa, within the Algiers Province. It is overseen by the Directorate of Forests and the Green Belt (CFA), and its activities are subject to the supervision of the General Directorate of Forests (DGF).

== Location ==
El-Marsa Forest is situated at a distance of 18 kilometers east of Algiers, 70 kilometers east of Tipaza, and 4 kilometers from the Mediterranean Sea. It is located within the commune of El Marsa, within the Mitidja Plain, in the Petite Kabylie.

== History ==
El-Marsa Forest is overseen by Decree No. 45-84, dated February 18, 1984, which has been amended and supplemented by Decree No. 09-07, dated January 11, 2007. The forest constitutes the eastern boundary of the Bay of Algiers.

The shrubs that populate this forest were the source of its Phoenician name, "Roussegonia," which translates to "Head of the Shrubs."

The proximity of this woodland to the Tamenfoust Port also contributed to its Amazigh name, Aguellou n'Tamentfoust, which translates to "the forest on the right side." This name is derived from its location on the right side relative to the mountaineers who descended towards Icosium (ancient Algiers) in past centuries.

El-Marsa Forest is situated to the northeast of the ancient archaeological site of Roussegonia, to the east of the old city and the Tamentfoust Port. This forest once constituted the perimeter of the Bordj Tamentfoust, an Ottoman fortress dating back to the period of the Regency of Algiers.

== Reforestation ==
El-Marsa Forest has benefited from the national reforestation plan, which was designed to protect and enhance its natural forest resources. To protect the forest, the perimeter has been enclosed with fences; however, this area has been significantly reduced from 13 hectares to 9.5 hectares due to the expansion of the urban fabric.

== Wildlife ==
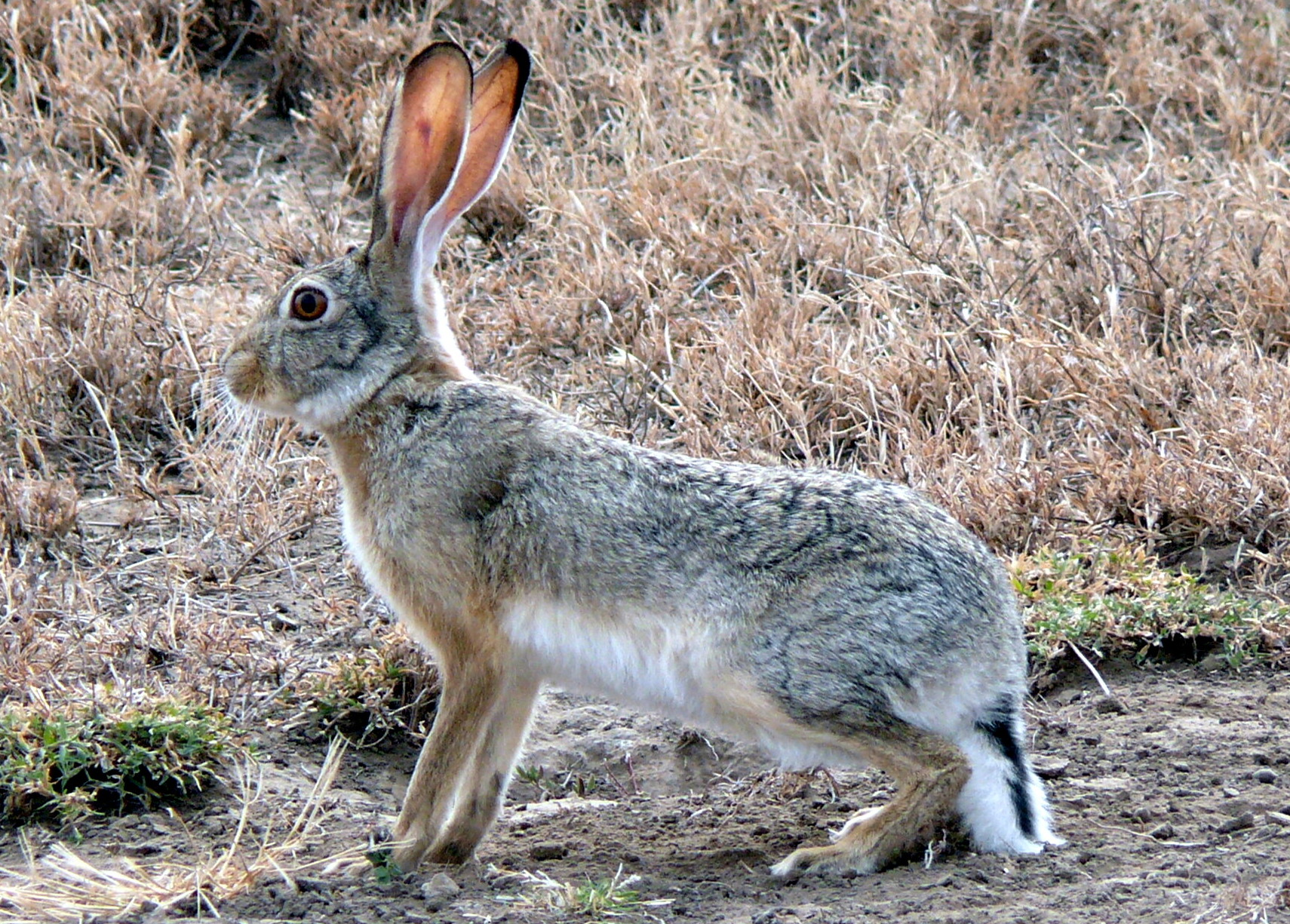
European rabbit (Oryctolagus cuniculus)

There are a few mammal species in the forest, such as the Algerian hedgehog (Atelerix algirus), the European rabbit (Oryctolagus cuniculus), the cape hare (Lepus capensis), and the wild boar (Sus scrofa).

== See also ==
- Muqras Mountain
- Chott Tinsilt
- Lake Sidi Mohamed Benali
