= Rusguniae (ruins) =

Ancient ruins in El Marsa, Algeria

- Rustonium, Belad Dakious, Medina Takious
- Alger-Plage, Tamentfoust
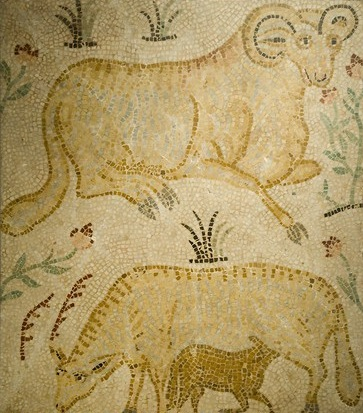
- Mosaics of the Basilica (currently at the Louvre)

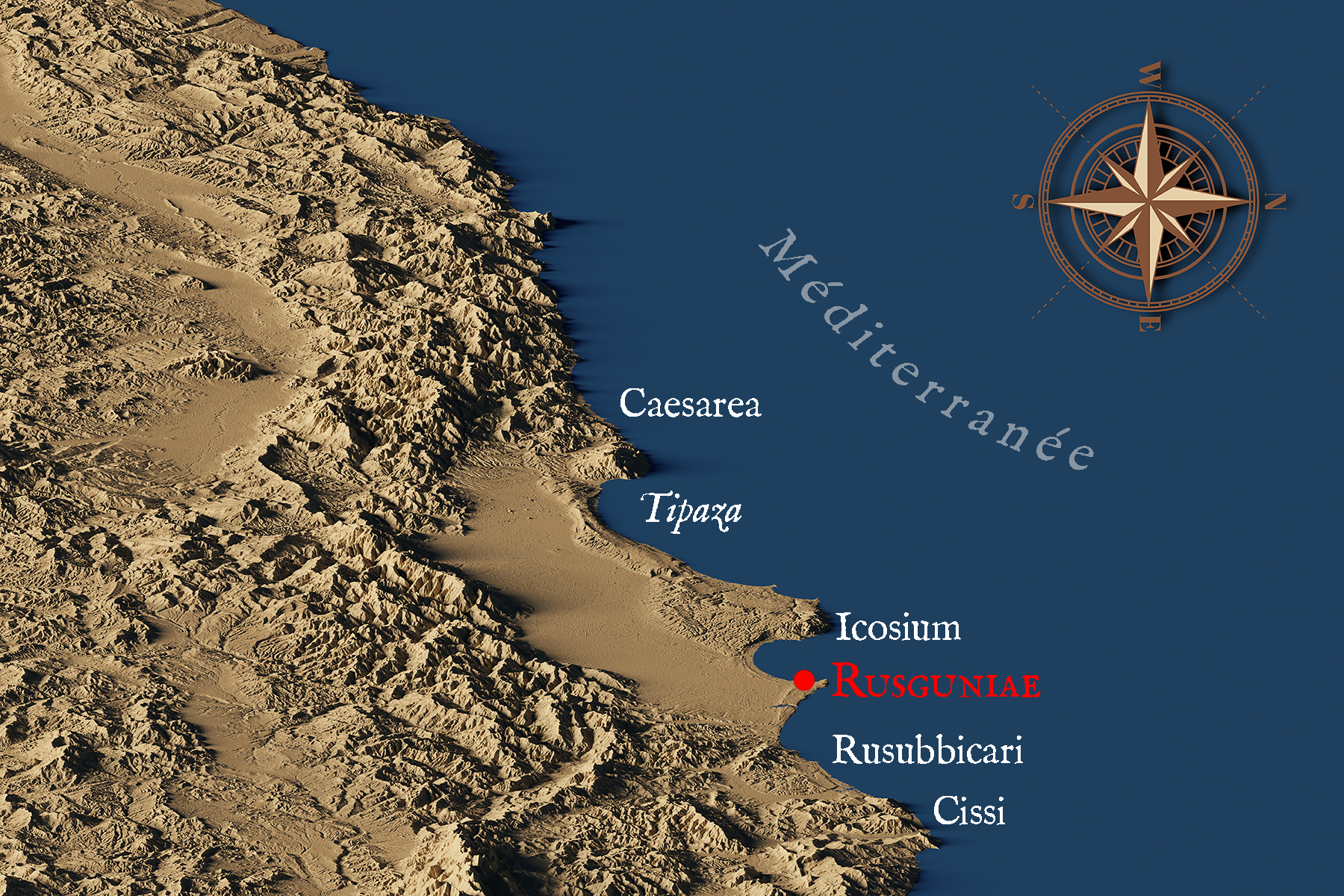
- Periods: Phenician, Roman
- Location: Between modern Tamentfoust and Bordj El Bahri
- Region: Alger, Algeria

History
- Built: ca. fourth century BC
- Abandoned: late antiquity

Site notes
- Elevation: 0–5 m (0–16 ft)
- Length: ~ 1,500 m (4,900 ft)
- Width: ~ 400 m (1,300 ft)
- Architectural style: Roman
- Excavation dates: First: 1899-1900
- Archaeologists: Chardon
- Condition: Almost vanished

Rusguniae is an ancient archaeological site located in the commune of El Marsa, in the wilaya of Algiers, Algeria.

== General setting ==
Rusguniae lies northeast of the Bay of Algiers, opposite the city of Algiers, the ancient Icosium. The site lies between modern Tamentfoust (formerly Laperouse) and Bordj-El-Bahri (Cap Matifou, as opposed to the cape of the same name that closes off the Bay of Algiers to the east). Rusguniae is situated along the coast. Today, almost no remains are visible due to the looting of most of the ancient buildings and the urban development that has covered the site and the surrounding area.

Given the rampant urbanisation of recent decades, which has completely disfigured the natural landscape, it is best to refer to Berbrugger's description of the area at the beginning of French colonisation to understand the geography of the region in its historical context. The Bay of Algiers and the Bay of Bengüt, where Rusguniae is located, can be roughly described as two semicircles that meet at the Cap du Matifou and delimit a very specific territory. At the beginning of the 19th century, nature, still largely untouched, seemed to isolate this region from the surrounding areas. Only the Haraouas tribe (who gave their name to the town of the same name) lived here, cultivating the land between the hills and the Mediterranean.

=== Historical and archaeological context ===
At the beginning of the 20th century, Gsell listed the archaeological remains known at the time in his "Atlas archéologique de l'Algérie" (AAA). These included a marble statue of a woman near the abutments of a bridge over the Hamiz and a bridge over the Bouira, a tributary of the Hamiz. In what appears to be modern Ain el Beida (Zerzouria), a few kilometres from Rusguniae, Gsell reports a network of ancient canals, the remains of buildings and a quarry, which Berbrugger considers to be Roman. Only the quarry, identified as Maherzat, remains today.

Further east, Gsell mentions Djezair el Kodra (only the present Ain-Chorb, anc. Surcouf, to the east of Ain-Taya, would correspond), an ancient islet now joined to the land by silting, where Berbrugger is said to have discovered "rather extensive Roman ruins", of which there is no trace on the ground or in the literature. Near a spring, Ain-Chrob or H'rob (translated as "drink and run away"), ancient remains were reported. Other ruins of lesser importance have been discovered at Réghaïa, as well as the remains of a Roman camp on the Oued Boudaou. Further west, near the mouth of the Oued-el-Harrach, Gsell discussed the possibility of the ruins of the city of Saça, although they have not yet been found. Finally, one kilometre from Maison-Carrée (now El-Harrach), a libyc inscription was found, testifying to the ancient history of the region.

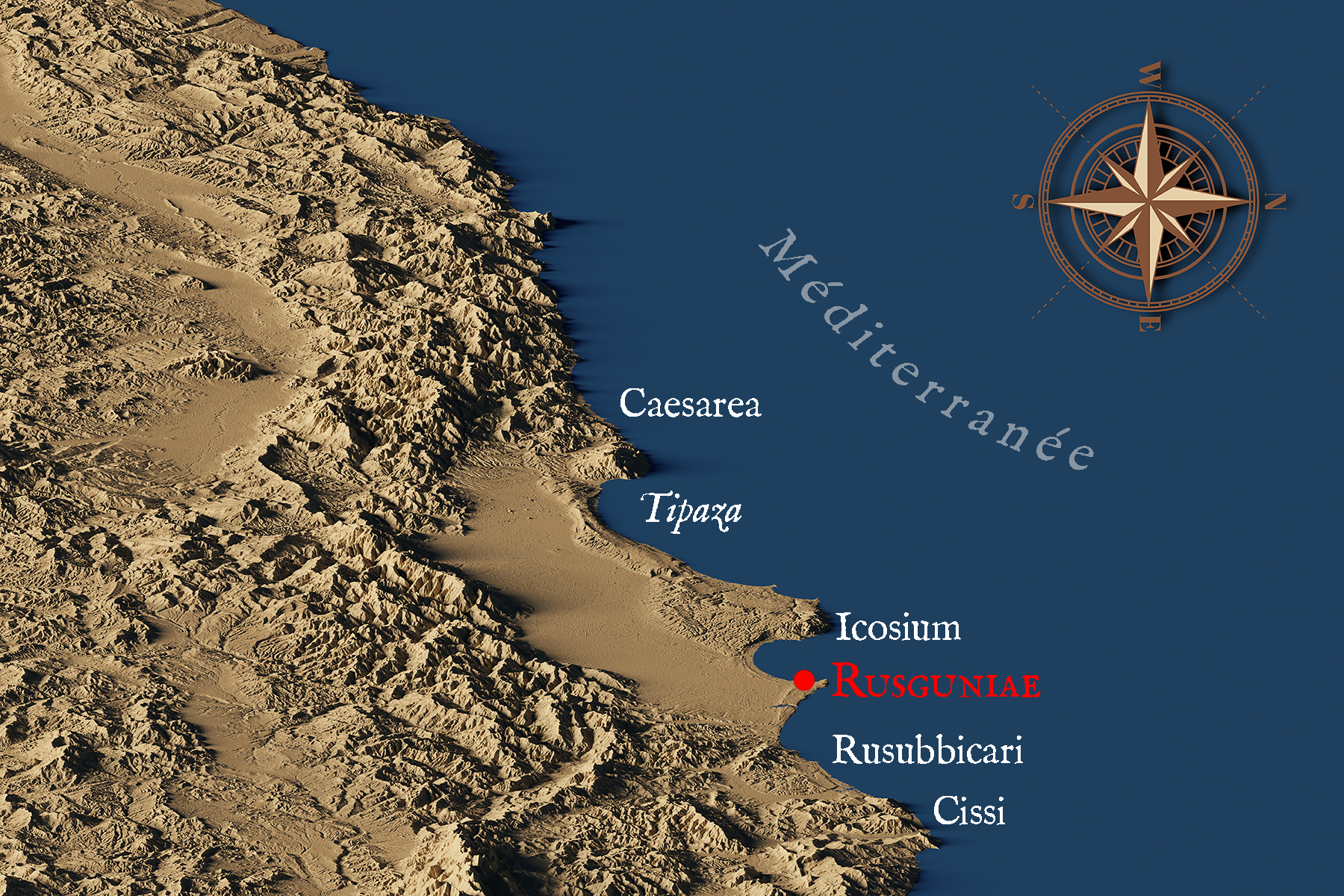
East-west view of the Algerian coast showing the position of Rusginiae (in red)

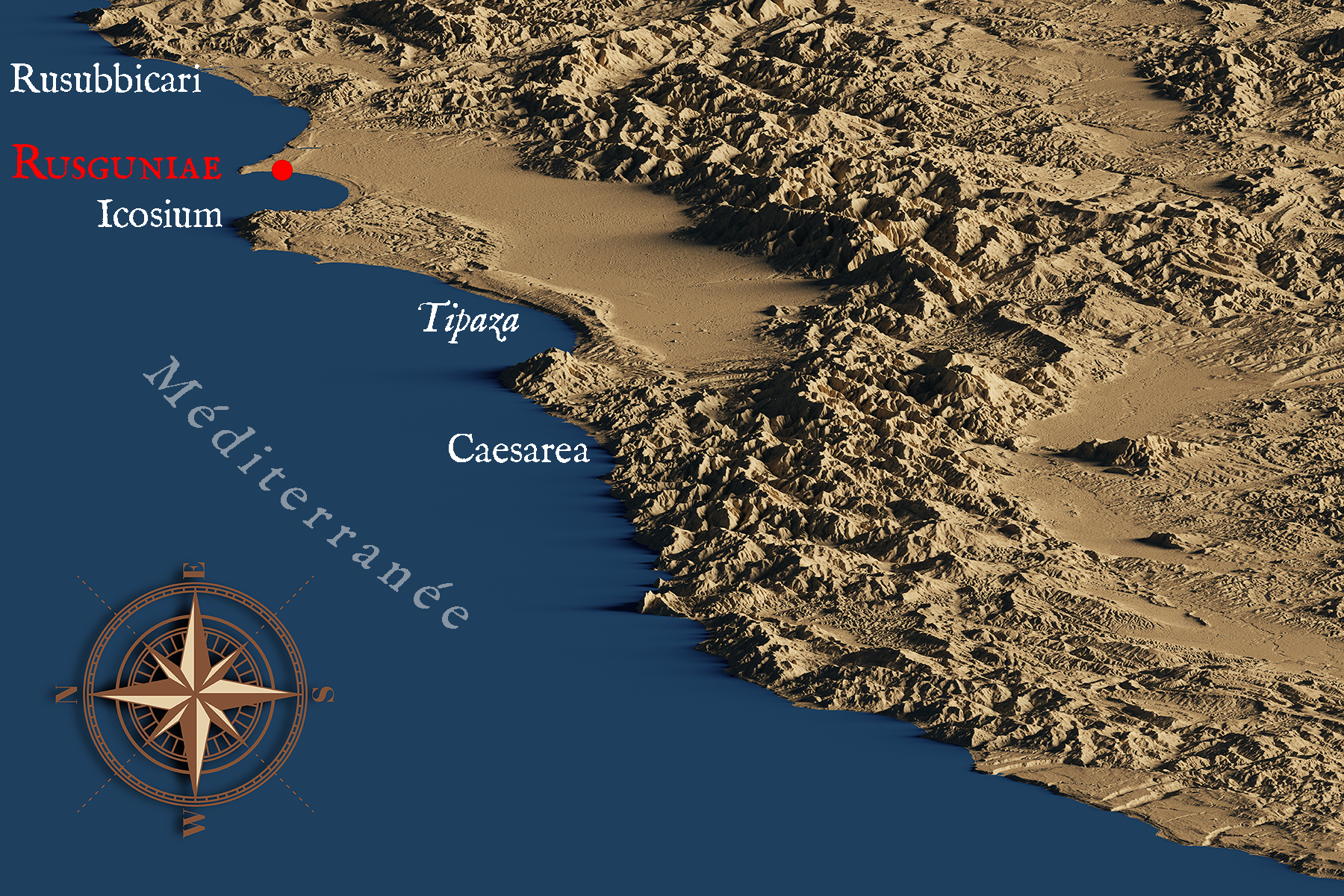
View from west to east of the Algerian coast showing the position of Rusginiae (in red)

=== Site selection ===
The choice of location for Rusguniae was probably dictated by its privileged geographical position, which offered natural protection from the summer winds and gusts, making it a safe haven for maritime navigation. This strategic location may explain why the site is so similar to that of Icosium, just opposite in the Bay of Algiers, but exposed to north-west and north-east winds due to the openness of its bay.

=== Site classification ===
In January 2008, a classification procedure was launched for the site known as "Ancient Rusguniae". The archaeological site, bounded to the north by the Aïn Taya road, to the south by the Ondines district, to the east by the Alger-Plage road and to the west by the chemin des ruines n°2, has had a protection zone extended to 200 metres from its boundaries.

== History ==
The region has been inhabited since the Neolithic period, with artefacts from the Mousterian and Neolithic industries being found on the cliffs of Cap Matifou.

Rusguniae, to the north-east of the Bay of Algiers and home to the Punic base of Tamentfoust, takes its name from the expression "Cap du Francolin". Berbrugger suggests that the origin of the name is a Berber word that was Latinised by the Romans to mean "cape of sleep" or "cape of sleepers", in reference to a local interpretation of the very popular theme of the sleepers of Ephesus. Mouloud Mammeri suggests that Rusguniae is composed of two roots: the Phoenician rus (the cape) and the Berber agouni (the cliff). Salama points out that Rusguniae already existed at the end of the fourth century BC, while the foundation of Icosium cannot be dated before the second century BC. The process of Roman colonisation in Rusguniae seems to indicate competition, with continental rather than maritime interests. The Bay of Algiers provided access to the Mitidja plain and the Chelif valley, which was more accessible from Rusguniae than from Icosium. This, combined with the probably more important status of Icosium, may have led to the choice of Rusguniae for the Roman settlement, thus avoiding direct competition.

=== Punic era ===
Lancel lists Rusginiae as one of the Phoenician trading posts that were "fairly evenly spaced every 30 or 40 km" along the Algerian coast. It was one of the main relay points for coastal shipping along the northern coast of the ancient Maghreb. Carthage's maritime empire, however, left no ruins. However, Salama highlights "the exceptional abundance of mixed amphora fragments dated between the 2nd century BC and the 7th century AD, proving that the coastal site was used extensively and continuously". In addition, about 100 Punic and neo-Punic stelae have been found in the area.

=== Roman era ===
After the civil wars at the end of the Republic and as a result of an interregnum in the Mauretan kingdom, Augustus had a number of coastal and sub-coastal positions systematically picked out for the establishment of veteran settlements, the starting point for the future annexation of the territory. The colonisation of Rusguniae by the IX Gemella legion preceded 27 AD. The list of these colonies, already formulated in the documentation of Pliny the Elder, can be easily verified thanks to epigraphic documents. The most important one concerning Rusguniae comes from three inscriptions placed on the second mile of the Roman road Rusguniae-Icosium, which transcribe the complete title of the city: COL(onia) IUL(ia) PONTIF(?) CL(?) RUSG(uniae) IIIIV LEG(ionis). Pliny the Elder, in his enumeration of the cities of Caesarean Mauritania, mentions Rusguniae among the colonies founded by Augustus.

It is known that the settlement grew and prospered from the 1st century AD until the Byzantine period. In Roman times, Rusguniae was the site of a temple dedicated to Saturn, also known as the Roman Baal Hamon. In 419 its bishop, together with those of Icosium and Rusuccuru, represented the province of Mauretania Caesarea at a council in Carthage.

According to ancient writers, it was destroyed by the Vandals or the Goths, although nothing seems to have survived to prove this.

=== Medieval and modern times ===
In the 12th century, the Arab geographer Al-Idrīsī described the ruins of Rusguniae as "[...] a small and ruined city. The surrounding walls are almost completely fallen down, the population is few; it is said to have once been a very large city, and the remains of ancient buildings, temples and stone columns can still be seen".

During the expedition against Algiers in October 1541, Charles V held a council of war among the ruins of the ancient Rusgunia. After this expedition, Marmol described it as an ancient city in the splendour of Roman times, in whose harbour the ships of Algiers anchored. The author points out that its ruins were reused in the construction of Algiers. A Spanish chronicle of the same period refers to "ancient houses, temples and aqueducts, numerous, great and beautiful", which seems unlikely in the light of other contemporary descriptions. Shaw described its ruins in 1757, pointing out that its remains had been looted for the construction of Algiers.

The proximity of Algiers, where urban development increased considerably during the Ottoman period (and even more so after the French conquest), dealt a fatal blow to this ancient city. It was used as a quarry for many centuries, and today modern buildings have partly covered its site.

== Archeology ==
=== Description by Berbrugger (1837) ===
In his description of the early days of French colonisation, Louis Adrien Berbrugger highlights the historical importance of Matifou, including Rusgunia, which is said to contain significant archaeological findings, including Latin inscriptions and the remains of ancient buildings. Elsewhere, Berbrugger describes some of the remains of the buildings that once surrounded the Roman city of Rusgunia, such as the walls and trenches of the rampart. The remains of an aqueduct and a water tower were also visible. Contrary to his expectations, the remains are not impressive rows of arcades, but a simple cement channel, sometimes covered with thick tiles.

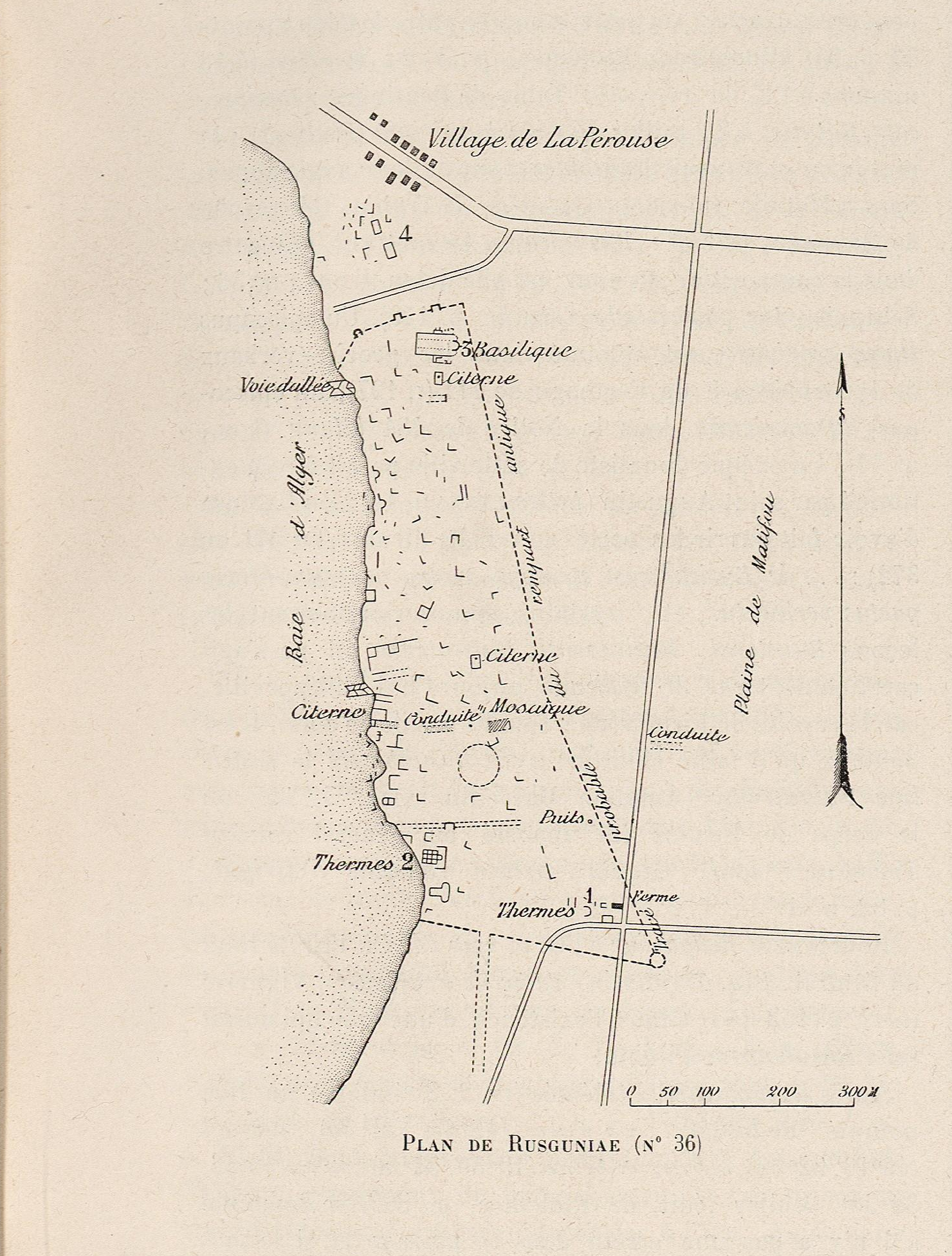
Plan of Rusguniae, Chardon.

=== The Chardon excavations (1899-1900) ===
The excavations carried out by Chardon (1899-1900) provided an insight into the Roman city of Rusguniae that the subsequent destruction of the site no longer allows, see his map of the site (appended). Despite the losses caused by sea erosion, the remains revealed a basilica, baths and numerous tombs, testifying to its crucial importance in the urban fabric of Roman North Africa. Founded by the Romans in a coastal area that provided a strategic anchorage for their ships, Rusguniae illustrates the strategic value of this region despite its geographical challenges. Despite being partially submerged by the sea and affected by earthquakes, at the time of the excavations the city had preserved remarkable remains, a reality that contrasts with its current state.

==== The basilica ====
From west to east, the basilica's architecture was relatively simple, with block walls and dressed stone at the corners. Its dimensions were 34.80 metres long and 20 metres wide, with an average thickness of 0.65 metres. Originally composed of three naves, the church had been modified over time, especially during the Byzantine restoration supervised by a certain Mauricius. The apse, raised by 0.95 metres, originally had a semicircular shape and was flanked by two sacristies. Traces of staircases indicate access to the apse from both sides of the building. The vault, which was badly damaged, revealed an interesting construction process using large jars filled with stones, large pebbles and mortar.

Distinct architectural modifications testify to two phases of construction, the first characterised by more meticulous workmanship, followed by a second characterised by more rudimentary methods, probably due to the "barbarian invasions and civil wars" that affected the region. The restoration of the Basilica by Mauricius (see below) involved the use of recycled materials, particularly columns and capitals from earlier pagan buildings.

The restructured basilica had five naves with reduced columns to suit the new configuration. Massive columns, elaborate capitals and a variety of architectural elements testify to the richness and diversity of the materials used. Fragments of votive steles and inscriptions offered a glimpse into the daily and spiritual life of the community that frequented the building.

Archaeological excavations had also revealed structural elements such as doorways, staircases, niches and buttresses, suggesting a complex use of the space around the basilica. Despite the damage sustained over the centuries, the architectural ensemble provided a fascinating window into the development of Christian architecture in North Africa.

Soundings made in the underground suggest that the basilica was built on the remains of another 4th-century Christian building, making this one of the oldest places of worship in Africa, according to Chardon.

==== Graves ====
Chardon discovered several tombs in the aisles of the basilica. On the right, near the diaconicum, was the tomb of a certain Mauricius, probably a high officer and possibly the military governor of Rusguniae. The tomb, which was opened during the excavations, consisted of two rows of ashlars covered by four large slabs. Inside, the mortar plaster covered a complete skeleton. A strong smell of aromatic substances suggested that the body had been embalmed, although this practice was rare among Christians. A small glass vial containing a brown deposit of holy oil from a martyr's tomb was found near the cranium. There was no trace of a coffin.

Further down, on the same side, were two other graves, one marked with a simple cross of coloured cubes embedded in cement. The stones of this vault had collapsed, but copper and iron nails and fragments of a wooden coffin had been recovered from the entrance. In accordance with Christian custom, the deceased were buried with their heads facing east, while the epitaphs were read from the same side. Along the left side aisle, three other tombs had been uncovered. In the first, opposite the door leading to the baptistery, lay a bishop. The inscription, which corresponded to the size of the tomb, was made using black and white cubes set into the fresh cement, with no mosaic linking them together.

==== Thermes ====
After the collapse of the cliff, the central part of the Rusguniae baths was exposed, revealing the structures of the ancient thermal complex. Among these, the hypocausts and the deambulatorium have been preserved, testifying to the advanced Roman design of the baths. A room paved with fine mosaics was discovered, as well as terracotta lamps decorated with birds and horsemen, one of which bore the monogram of a potter.

Close to the cliff, a mosaic paved area with a drainage channel underlined the sophistication of the hydraulic infrastructure. The walls of the baths, built of large blocks of masonry and reinforced with layers of red brick, bore witness to their age in comparison with other surrounding buildings. Despite the damage caused by the passage of time, part of the baths still survived, raising the prospect of further discoveries.

=== Mosaics ===
The excavation of the church in January 1900 was accelerated, perhaps in the rush to claim scientific ownership of the site from Chardon. Unfortunately, the excavation of the tombs without due care for the mosaics above them led to their deterioration. We do, however, have a record of the mosaics, which Noël reproduces.

The main mosaic, now in the Musée d'Alger, is an imposing 2m90 x 2m30. Officially entitled "The Good Shepherd Milking His Sheep", it is in poor condition, particularly in the areas of greatest iconographic interest. Elements such as the contours and the shepherd's costume appear to be generally complete, according to the survey mentioned above. In the lower part of the composition, two rams facing each other, separated by a flowering rosebush, are still complete. However, some parts, such as the hut on the upper left, have been reduced to dark patches, and elements such as the shepherd carrying a lamb on his shoulders have been badly damaged, leaving only fragmentary parts visible. Even the ewe being milked by another shepherd is incomplete, leaving only a few recognisable parts.

Another panel in the Louvre shows a lying ram and a ewe with a lamb. Although accurate descriptions are rare, this panel also appears to have been damaged, with inaccuracies in the spatial representation of the animals. Three other small panels were originally planned as part of the same ensemble, but their final fate remains uncertain. They would probably have been kept by the owners of the estate. Finally, other fragments of the mosaic are scattered, some remaining in Algeria, others in France. These fragments contain representations of sheep, fish and perhaps even border elements. However, their current state and exact location remain difficult to determine.

== Numismatic hoard ==
In August 1943, a group of American soldiers, present as part of Operation Torch, were tasked with earthworks on the beach. The bulldozer encountered a small mound of earth along the beach, uncovering an urn or earthen vase in which Roman coins were discovered.

This hoard, acquired by the American Numismatic Society in 1946, consists of a total of one hundred and thirty sesterces, spread over a period of about one hundred and fifty years. Sixty-four of these coins date from the reigns of Nerva to Commodus, covering the end of the first century and the end of the second, while the remaining sixty-six sesterces belong to the third century, from Septimius Severus to Trulia Soaemias.

As for the period in which the hoard There are only two coins of Decius in the hoard. This suggests that it was buried before its owner could acquire a large number of coins of this ruler, and that Decius was still in power at the time of burial. On this basis, it seems plausible to conclude that the hoard was buried in 250 AD, probably in late summer or early autumn.

As for the circumstances surrounding the burial of the hoard, it is quite possible that it was linked to the period of Christian persecution under Decius, between January and July 250, or even in the months that followed. However, without concrete evidence, it is difficult to be certain about the reasons for this concealment.
