= Tamentfoust =

Site in the Dar El Beïda District of Algiers in Algeria

- Rusguniae; La Pérouse
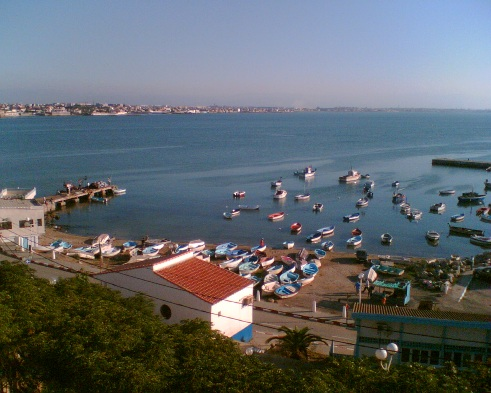
- Tamentfoust port

- Location within Algeria
- 36.75°N 5.066667°E
- Location: Algeria
- Region: Algiers Province
- Cap Matifou Lighthouse
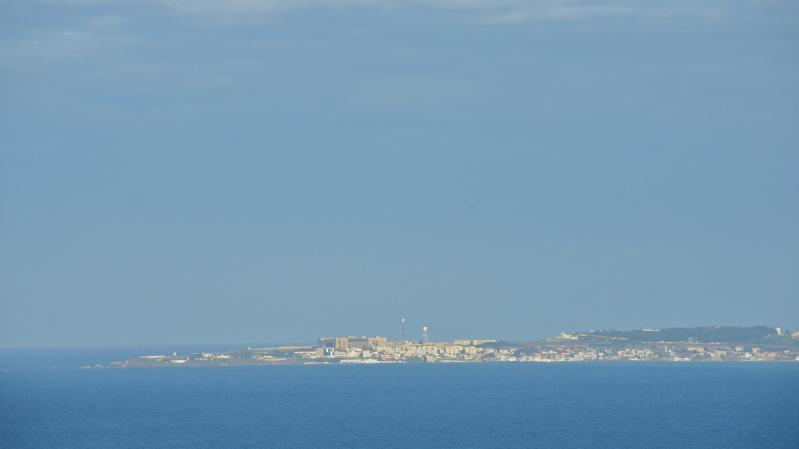
- Coordinates: 36°48′42.2″N 3°14′43.29″E
- Constructed: 1868
- Foundation: masonry base
- Construction: masonry tower
- Height: 6 metres (20 ft)
- Shape: quadrangular tower with balcony and light attached to 1-storey keeper’s house
- Markings: white tower
- Operator: Office Nationale de Signalisation Maritime
- Focal height: 74 metres (243 ft)
- Light source: main power
- Range: 23 nautical miles (43 km; 26 mi)
- Characteristic: Fl (3) W 15s.

Tamentfoust (Arabic: تمنتفوست), the classical Rusguniae and colonial La Pérouse, is a site in the Dar El Beïda District of Algiers in Algeria.

== Geography ==
Tamentfoust lies on Cape Matifou, which forms the northeast side of the Bay of Algiers.

== Names ==
The Roman name Rusguniae is a latinization of the Punic name ršgny (𐤓𐤔𐤂𐤍𐤉), meaning "Francolin Cape" and referring to nearby Cape Matifou. Ptolemy hellenized the name as Rhoustónion (Ancient Greek: Ῥουστόνιον), and it appears in late sources as Rusgume, Rugunie, and Rusgimia.

The French name La Pérouse (literally "Perugia") honored the naval officer and explorer Jean-François de Galaup, who owned an estate of that name.

Tamentfoust is a Berber name for "right side", from the cape's position relative to Algiers. The present name of the cape, Matifou, is a 14th-century Spanish approximation of the Berber name.

== History ==
Rusguniae was established as a colony along the trade route between the Strait of Gibraltar and Phoenicia. It consisted of a small fortress on Cape Matifou. It eventually fell under Carthaginian control, probably during the 6th century BC.

After the Punic Wars, the area fell under Roman hegemony and Augustus established a colony there for the 9th Legion at some point during his reign.

In late antiquity, it was part of the Vandal Kingdom prior to the Byzantine reconquest of Africa. It was overrun by the Umayyad Caliphate in the 7th century.

Bordj Tamentfoust or Tamentfoust Castle was built by Ramdhan Agha in 1661. It was the site of the official declaration of a jihad against France on 23 July 1830, in response to the French invasion of the country.

== Religion ==
Rusguniae was a Christian bishopric. It was notionally restored as a Catholic titular see in the 20th century:

=== List of bishops ===
- José Gabriel Anaya y Diez de Bonilla (1967.09.15 – 1976.01.06)
- Paul Zinghtung Grawng (1976.01.24 – 1976.12.09)
- Rigoberto Corredor Bermúdez (1988.02.26 – 1996.11.30)
- Anthony Ireri Mukobo, IMC (1999.12.22 – present)

== Ruins ==
Alongside the museum at Bordj Tamentfoust, the site also has ruins of Roman Rusguniae. Maritime history is represented by the Naval Academy of Tamentfoust, known as the biggest naval academy on the continent. The views from the harbor are also a major attraction for visitors.

== Gallery ==
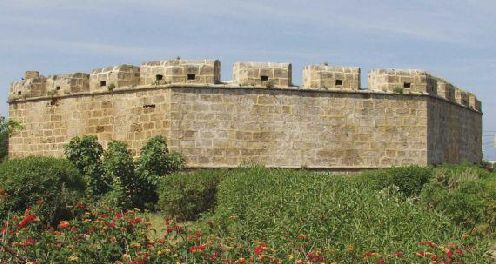
Bordj Tamentfoust

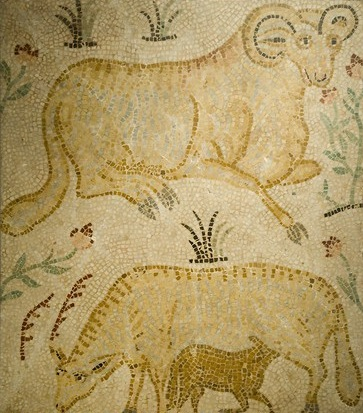
Mosaic of Rusguniae

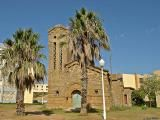
Old church

== See also ==
- List of lighthouses in Algeria
