= Bordj Tamentfoust =

Ottoman fort in Algeria

Coordinates: 36.4826°N 03.1351°E

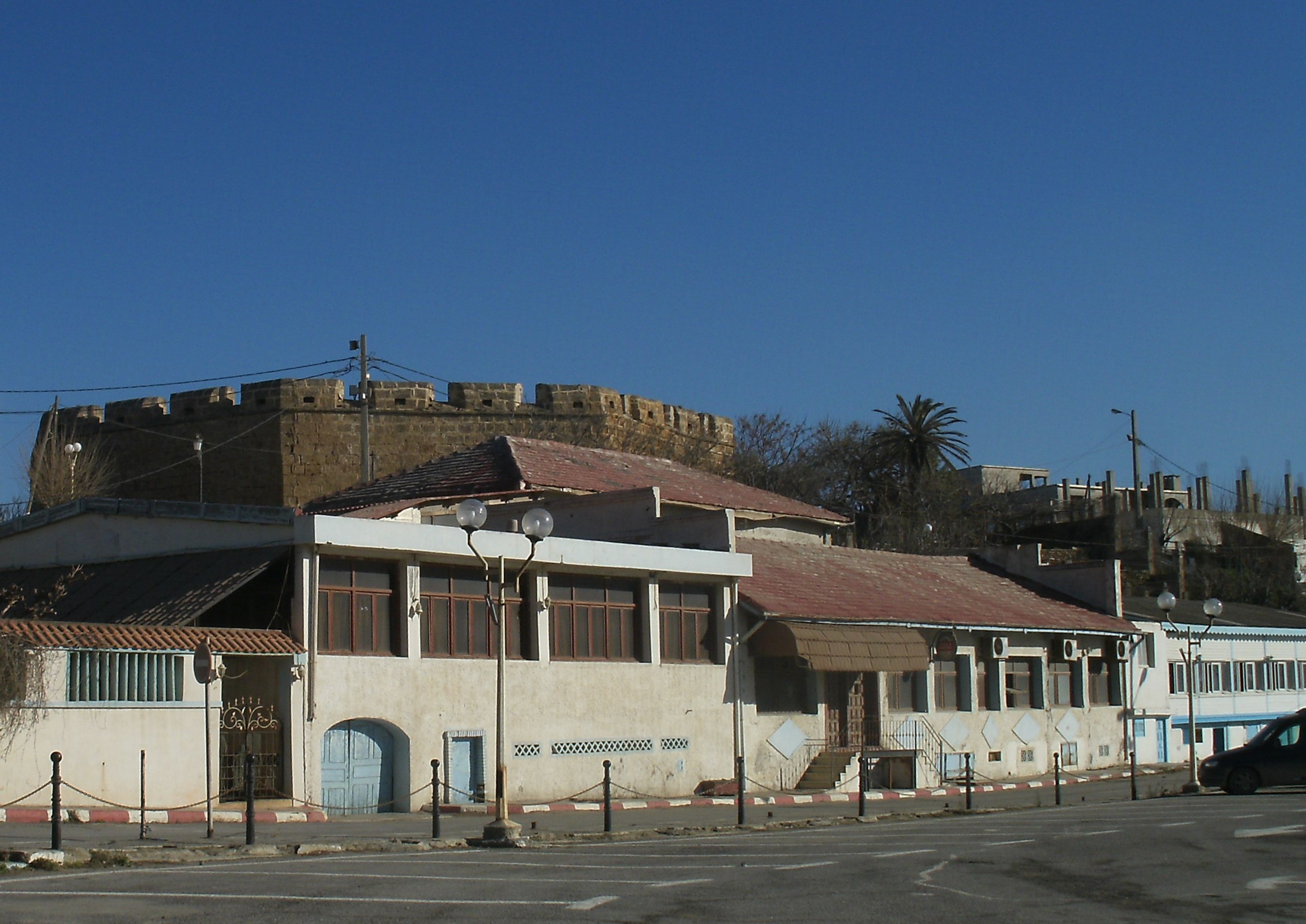
- Tamentfoust Tower
- Location: Algeria
- Type: Tower
- Opening date: 1661 AD
- Website: El Marsa, Algiers

Bordj Tamentfoust (Arabic: برج تامنفوست) is a fort in the city of Tamentfoust, Algeria. The fort, built on the highest point of Tamentfoust, at the eastern end of the Bay of Algiers, is among several forts built to guard the city during the Regency period. With the exception of Bordj Tamentfoust, most of the forts no longer exist or in a good condition.

== History ==
It was commissioned in 1661 during the rule of Ismail Pasha, on the part of Agha Ramadan in the Regency of Algiers. It was later renovated in 1685 by Hussein Mozomorto, a dey hailed from Italy. The exact date of construction is remain contested. French historian Émile Boutin says that it was built in 1685 in response to the French military campaign led by Abraham Duquesne. of bombing the city of Algiers. Another French historian Georges Marçais says that it was built in 1722 under the rule of the dey Muhammad Pasha.

The fort was primarily built using materials sourced from the ruins of the ancient Roman town of Rusguniae, located in the modern municipality of El Marsa.

Tamentfoust Tower played a ceremonial role, as its cannon fire marked the arrival and appointment of a new Pasha in the Regency of Algiers, sent by the Ottoman Sublime Porte in Istanbul.

Historically, the area near the fort served as the evacuation point for the troops of Charles V following the disastrous defeat of his fleet during the Battle of Algiers from October 21 to 25, 1541.

The tower was included in a restoration program by the Algerian Ministry of Culture between 2002 and 2005, with a restoration budget of 8 million Algerian dinars.

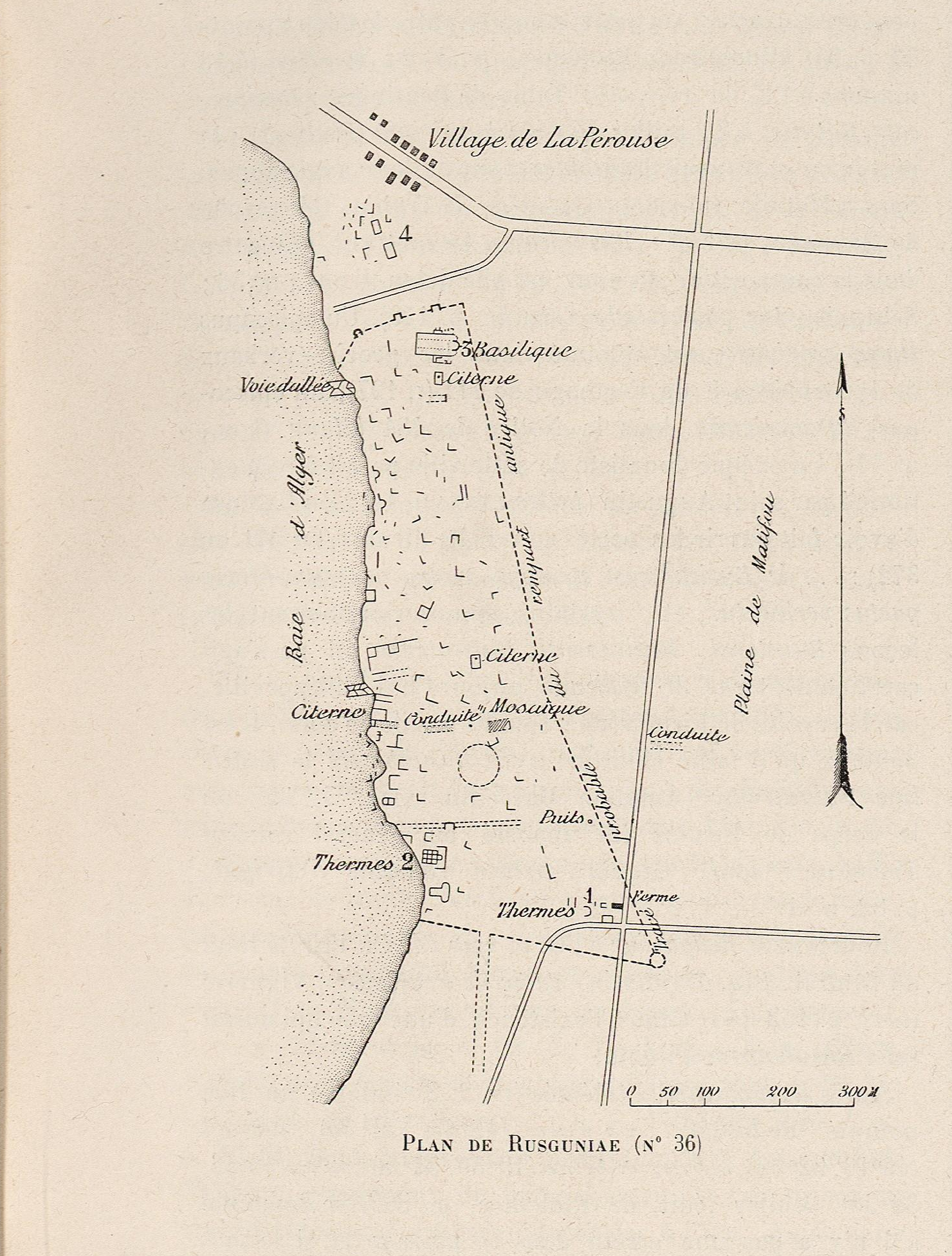
Tamentfoust

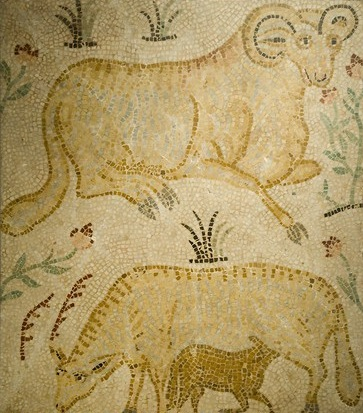
Tamentfoust

== Battles ==
The site of Tamentfoust Tower and Tamentfoust Port was frequently targeted during most of the European naval campaigns against the Casbah of Algiers during the rule of the Regency of Algiers and Ottoman Algeria.

The strategic importance of this location stemmed from the relatively short maritime distance between Tamentfoust Tower and Amar Tower, which is approximately 15 kilometers. This positioning enabled Algerian artillery to effectively target foreign ships within a range of 7.5 kilometers from both towers out at sea.

This strategic advantage made Tamentfoust a frequent objective of European naval forces during their repeated assaults on Algiers.

European battles against Tamanfest tower and harbor
رقم	Battle	Date	European leaders	Algerian leaders
01	Battle of Algiers (1510 AD)	May 1510 AD	Ferdinand II of Aragon Pedro Navarro	Salim at-Toumi
02	Capture of Algiers (1516)	September 1516 AD	Diego de Vera Abu Abdallah al-Mutawakkil	Salim at-Toumi Hayreddin Barbarossa Aruj Barbarossa
03	Capture of Peñón of Algiers (1529)	29 May 1529 AD	Martín de Vargas	Hayreddin Barbarossa
04	Algiers expedition (1541)	21 October 1541AD	Charles V	Hasan Agha
05	Bombardment of Algiers (1682)	22 July 1682 AD	Abraham Duquesne	Baba Hassan
06	Bombardment of Algiers (1683)	26 Jun 1683 AD	Abraham Duquesne	Baba Hassan
07	Battle of Algiers (1775)	1775 AD	Alejandro O'Reilly	Mohamed Osman Pasha
08	Bombardment of Algiers (1783)	4 August 1783 AD	Antonio Barceló	Mohamed Osman Pasha
09	Battle of Algiers (1784)	August 1784 AD	Antonio Barceló	Mohamed Osman Pasha
10	Bombardment of Algiers (1816)	27 August 1816 AD	Exmouth Theodorus Frederik van Capellen	Omar Agha

== Location ==
Tamentfoust Tower is situated near the Tamentfoust Port along the coastal strip, not far from the mouth of the Oued El Harrach. It lies 28 kilometers by land from the Casbah of Algiers.

This prominent location on the coastal strip and its position overlooking the Gulf of Algiers make it a strategically site. It faces the highway that connects the municipalities of El Marsa and Bordj El Bahri.

The tower is located approximately 20 kilometers east of Algiers and offers a clear view of the Mediterranean Sea. It stands on the coastline of the Métidja Plain and the Kabylie region.

== Architecture of Tamentfoust Tower ==
The external architecture of Tamentfoust Tower features a stone structure with an octagonal base and a parallelepipedal form. This distinctive design makes the tower unique within the Maghreb region.

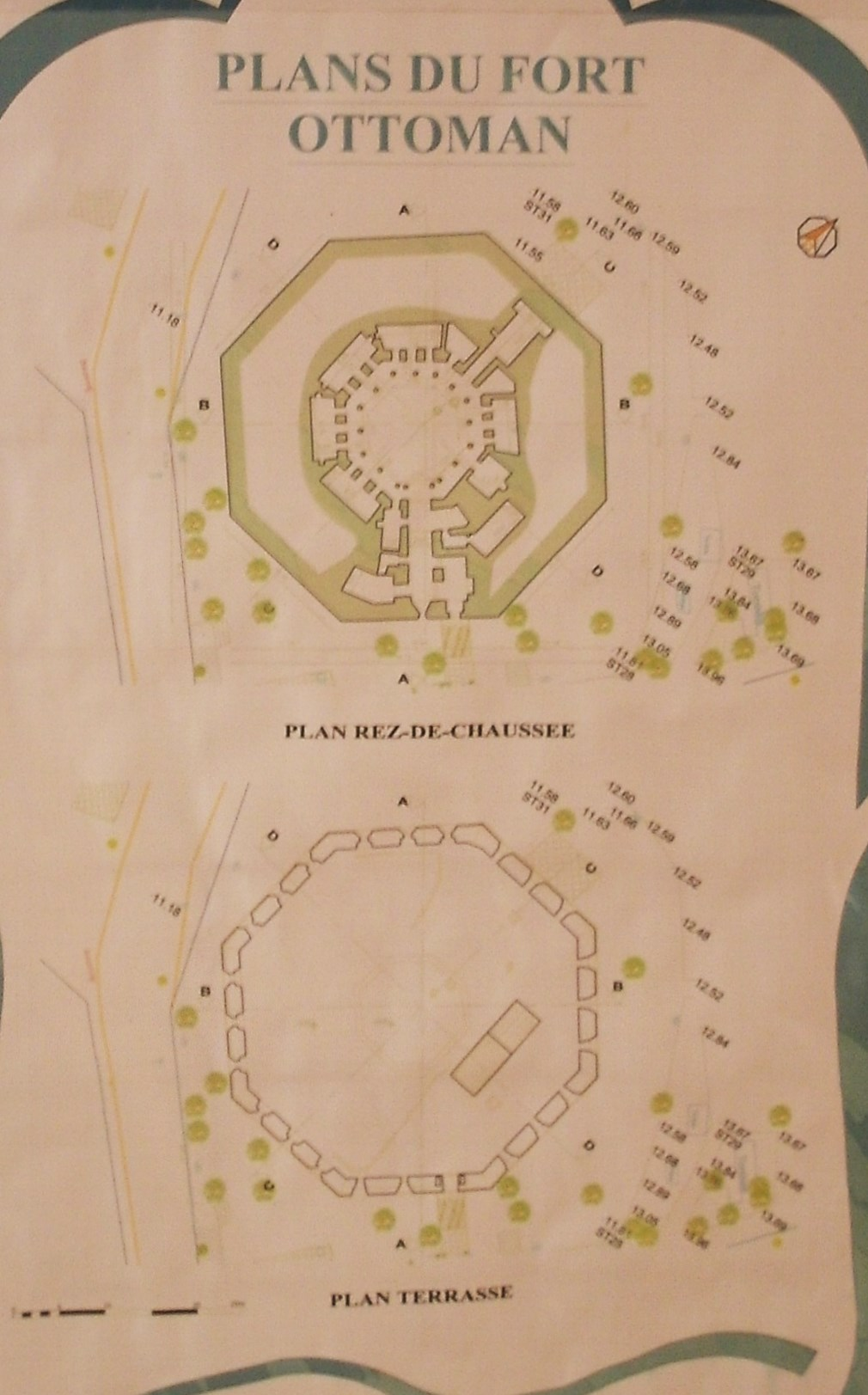
tamentfoust Fortress Blueprint

The tower is encircled by a moat approximately 3 meters deep, which can be crossed from the southeast side via a drawbridge. This bridge, measuring 5 meters in length and 1.5 meters in width, connects the rear entrance of the tower to the bottom of the moat. The fort was adjoined with another fort called "Bordj al-Ingliz" (Arabic: برج الإنجليز) which was equipped with a moat as well.

The main facade of the tower includes a platform situated behind walls that rise to a height of 9 meters. These walls are topped with small, angular turrets featuring loopholes.

The upper exterior courtyard is characterized by a broad circular gallery.

Inside, the fortress comprises a ground floor and an internal lower courtyard. The entrance hall on the ground floor leads to a central courtyard via an arched corridor. Off this corridor are various functional spaces, including a kitchen, a prayer room, a prison, a bathhouse, and an armory.

A staircase located to the right of the arched corridor provides access to the upper exterior courtyard. From this vantage point, visitors can enjoy panoramic views of Cape Tamentfoust and the Bay of Algiers.

The upper courtyard originally housed 22 cannons arranged to defend against hostile naval fleets and protect the Algerian fleet. One cannon was positioned above the main entrance, while the remaining 21 were distributed, with three placed on each of the seven other sides.

== Classification ==
Tamentfoust Tower was classified as part of Algeria's cultural heritage in 1967. Since then, the fortress has been periodically fenced and restored, and it is utilized for various cultural events. This classification followed Ordinance No. 67-281, issued on December 20, 1967, after Algeria gained independence. The ordinance aimed to regulate the exploration and protection of Algeria's cultural heritage, replacing the legal framework established during the French colonial period.

== Historical Role of Tamentfoust Tower ==
=== Lazaretto ===
Tamentfoust Tower served as a lazaretto from the 16th to the 19th century, up until the French occupation of Algeria.

=== Muhammad bin Zadhum's pledge of allegiance ===
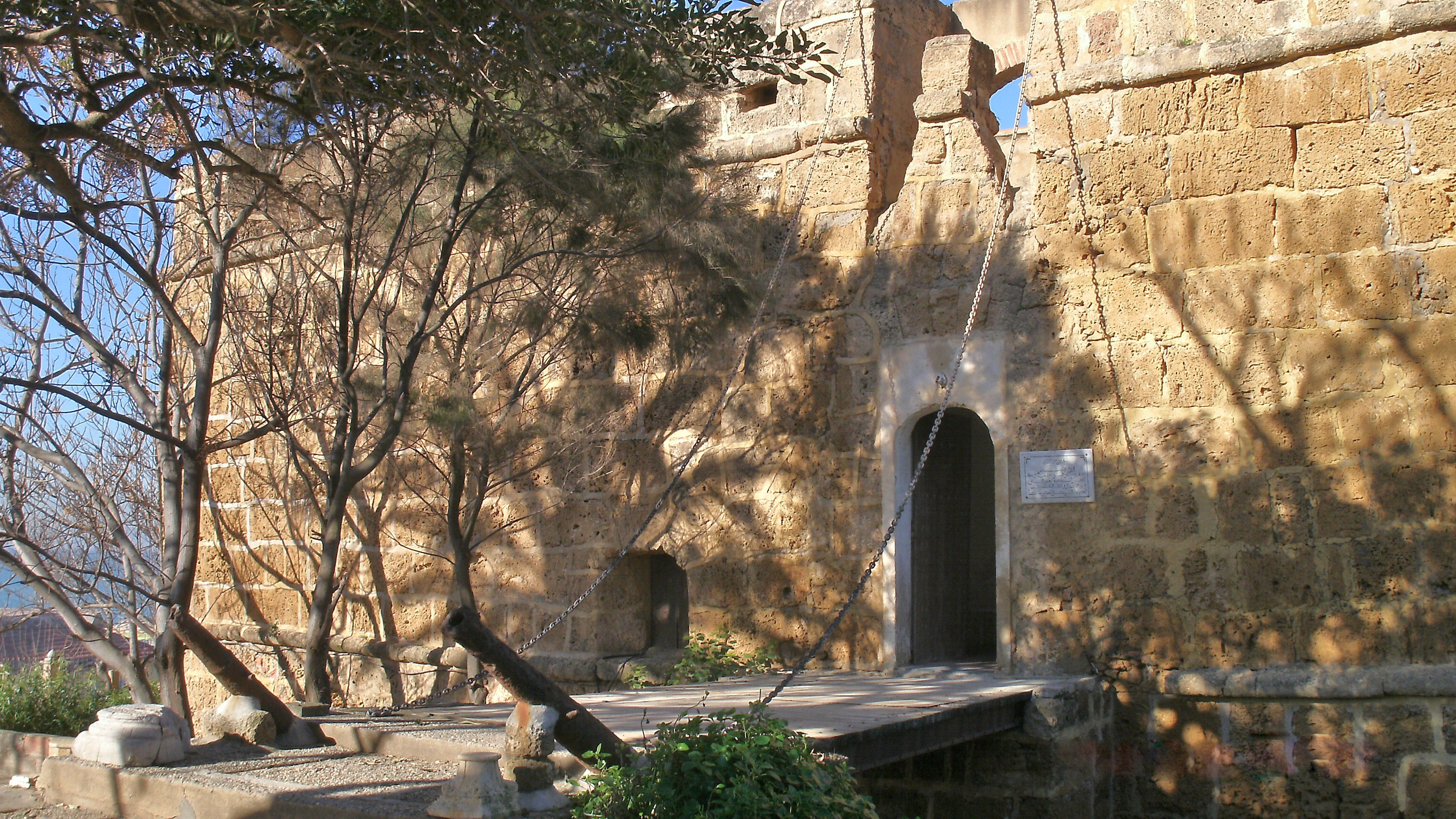
Tamentfoust Fortress Entrance

Tamentfoust Tower played a pivotal role in Algeria's early resistance to French colonization. Following the fall of Algiers on July 5, 1830, and the subsequent French assault on Blida, the tower became the site of events, including the alliance between Mohamed Ben Zamoum and Ali Ould Si Saadi, leaders of the popular resistance in Mitidja, Kabylie, and Titteri.

After the fall of Algiers, Marshal de Bourmont claimed that local tribes had seized livestock sent by the Bey of Titteri to supply the French army. In response, the French launched a campaign against Blida on July 23, 1830, deploying around 1,000 infantry, 300 cavalry, and artillery units.

The inhabitants of Blida, feigning surrender, allowed the French troops to enter without resistance. On the morning of July 24, 1830, they launched a surprise attack from the Chréa mountains and surrounding plains. According to French sources, the French forces suffered heavy losses, with 80 soldiers killed. The survivors barely managed to escape through the city's Bab El-Djazaïr gate, crawling to safety.

This confrontation had several significant consequences:

1. The French forces abandoned their plans to expand beyond Algiers.
2. The Bey of Titteri, Mustapha Boumezrag, declared his independence from French authority.
3. Tribal leaders and Sufi orders convened at Tamentfoust Tower, where they decided to unify the resistance under the leadership of Mohamed Ben Zamoum and Ali Ould Si Saadi.

Under Ben Zamoum's leadership, the resistance aimed to besiege the French forces in Algiers by cutting off all supply routes. This strategy effectively confined the French army to the capital, creating a precarious situation. French soldiers venturing beyond the city walls were frequently ambushed and killed. Notably, Colonel Frécheville was killed in El Harrach during one such attempt to break the siege.

=== Museum ===
On May 27, 1999, Tamentfoust Tower was transformed into a historical museum under the supervision of the Algerian Ministry of Culture. The museum features four exhibition halls located around the ground-floor courtyard, displaying artifacts from various periods, including prehistoric times, the Roman Empire, and the Islamic era.

These artifacts were provided by the National Museum of Bardo in Algiers through the National Agency for Archaeology and the Protection of Historic Sites and Monuments (French: Agence nationale d'archéologie et de la protection des sites et monuments historiques).

The museum, located near the small Tamentfoust port, offers an engaging experience for visitors, combining cultural enrichment with recreational opportunities.

=== Excavation Program at Tamentfoust Tower ===
In April 2015, the Algiers Province launched an archaeological excavation program around Tamentfoust Tower, covering an area of 117 hectares. The excavation plan focuses on the ancient city of Rusguniae (Latin: Rusguniae), located around the fortress. This project involves archaeologists from Bab Ezzouar University and other Algerian cultural institutions, aiming to uncover and scientifically, culturally, and touristically exploit this historical heritage.

== Photos gallery ==
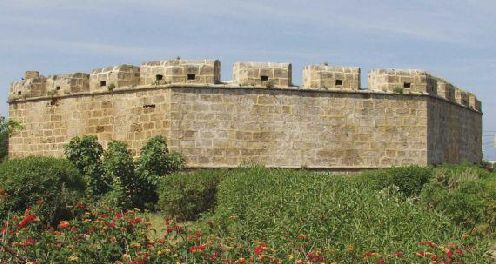
View of Tarmentfoust Fortress

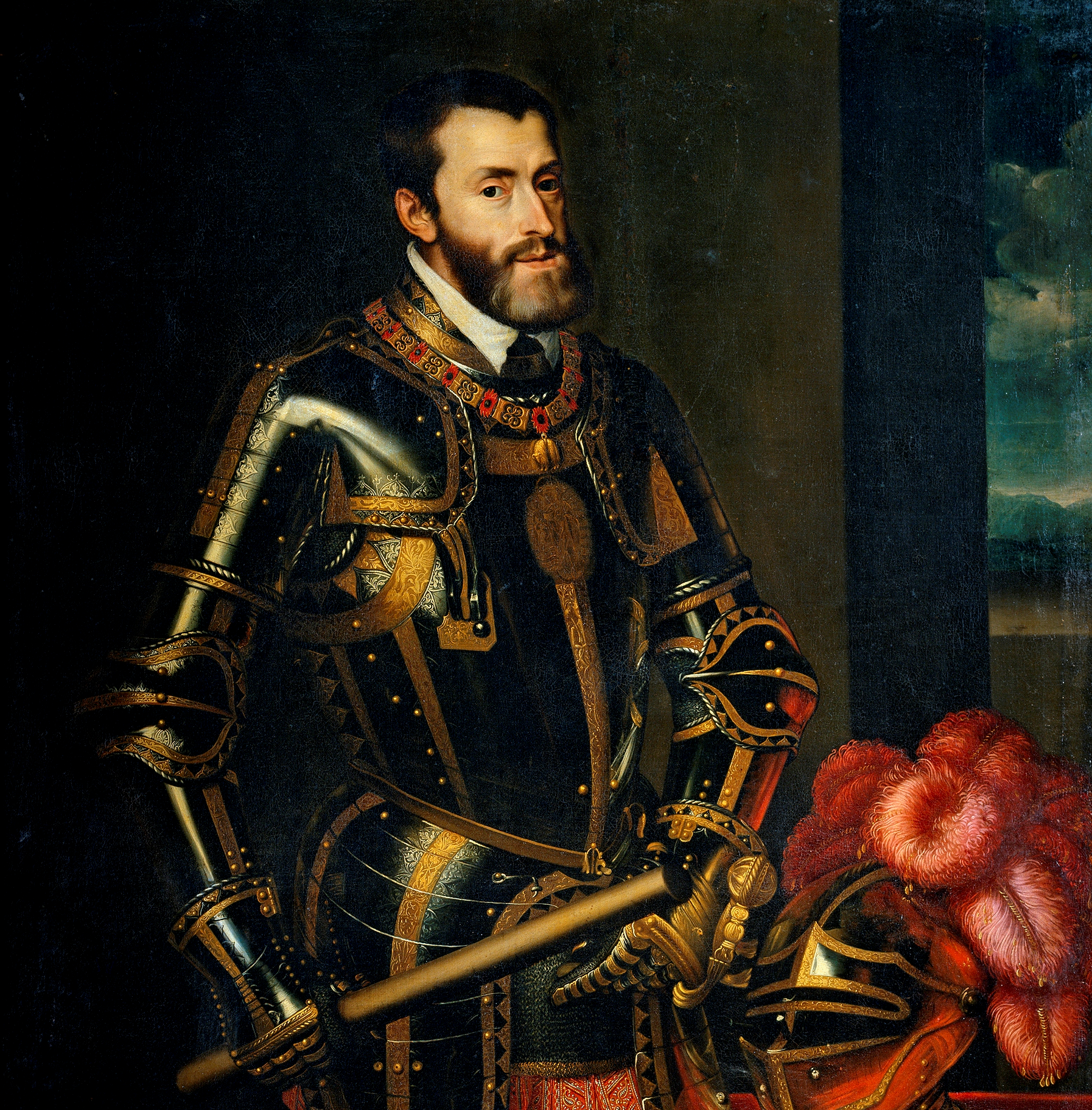
Carlos V

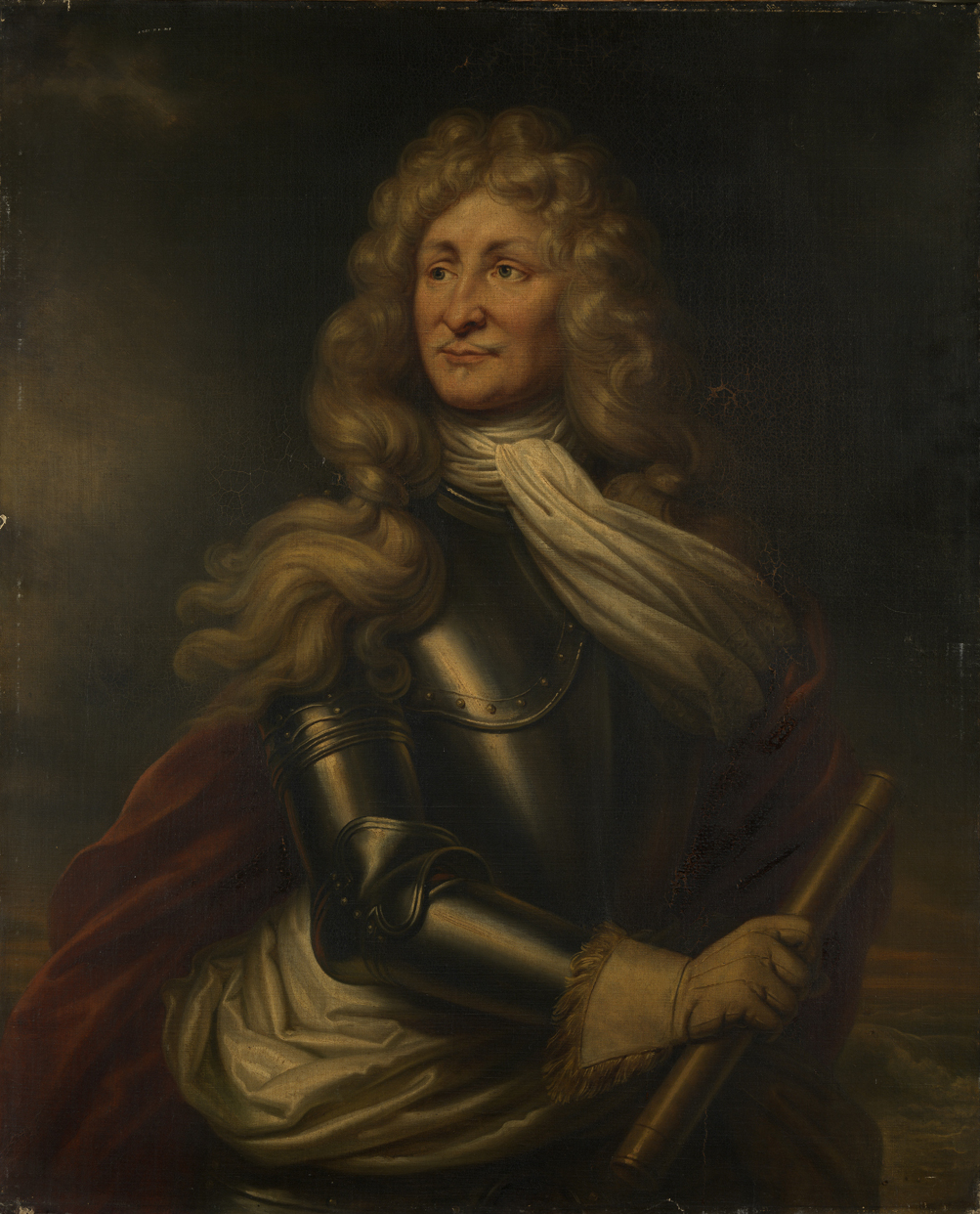
Abraham Ducassin

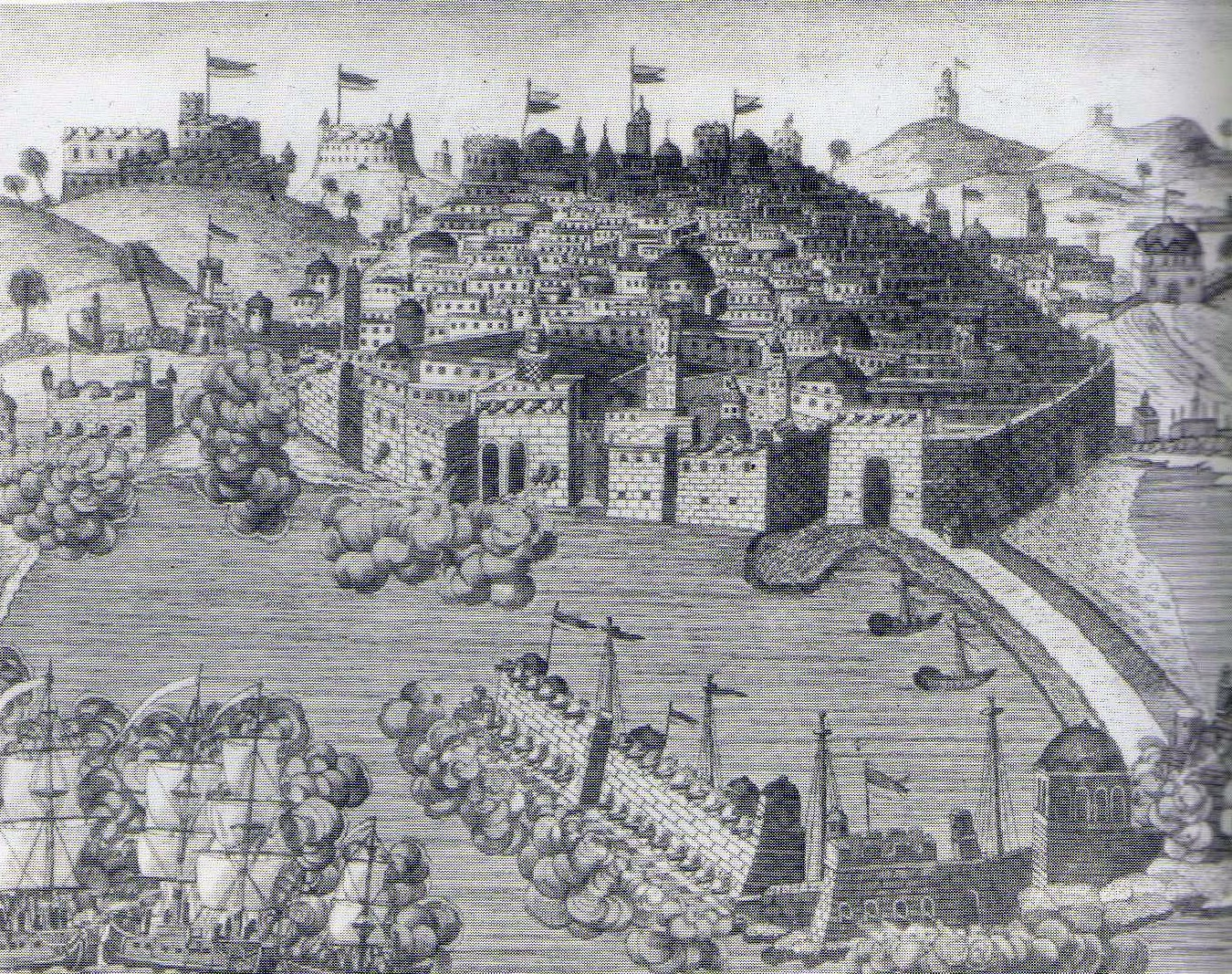
Naval attack on Algeria (1682 AD) by Abraham Ducassin

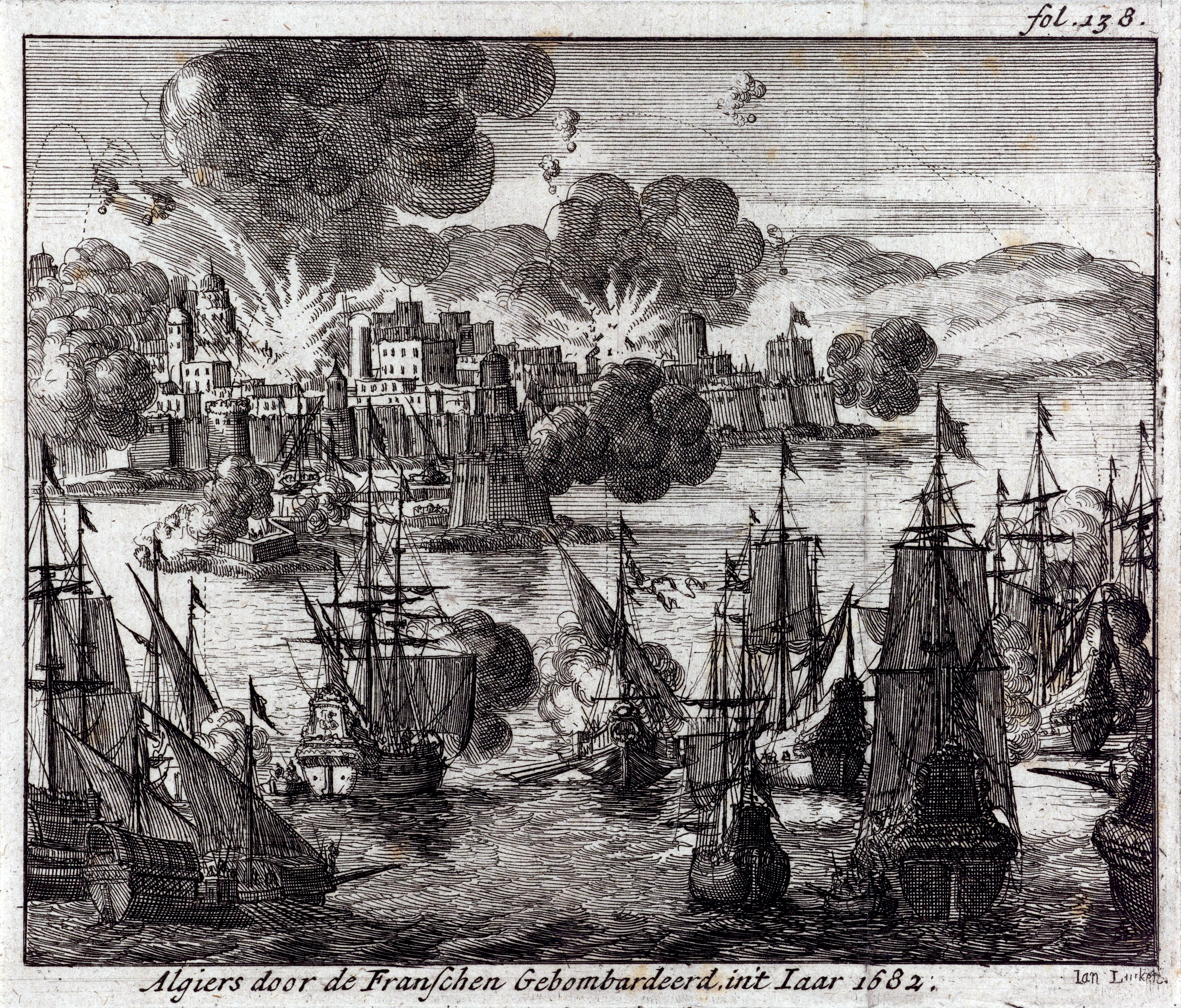
Naval attack on Algeria (1682 AD) by Abraham Ducassin

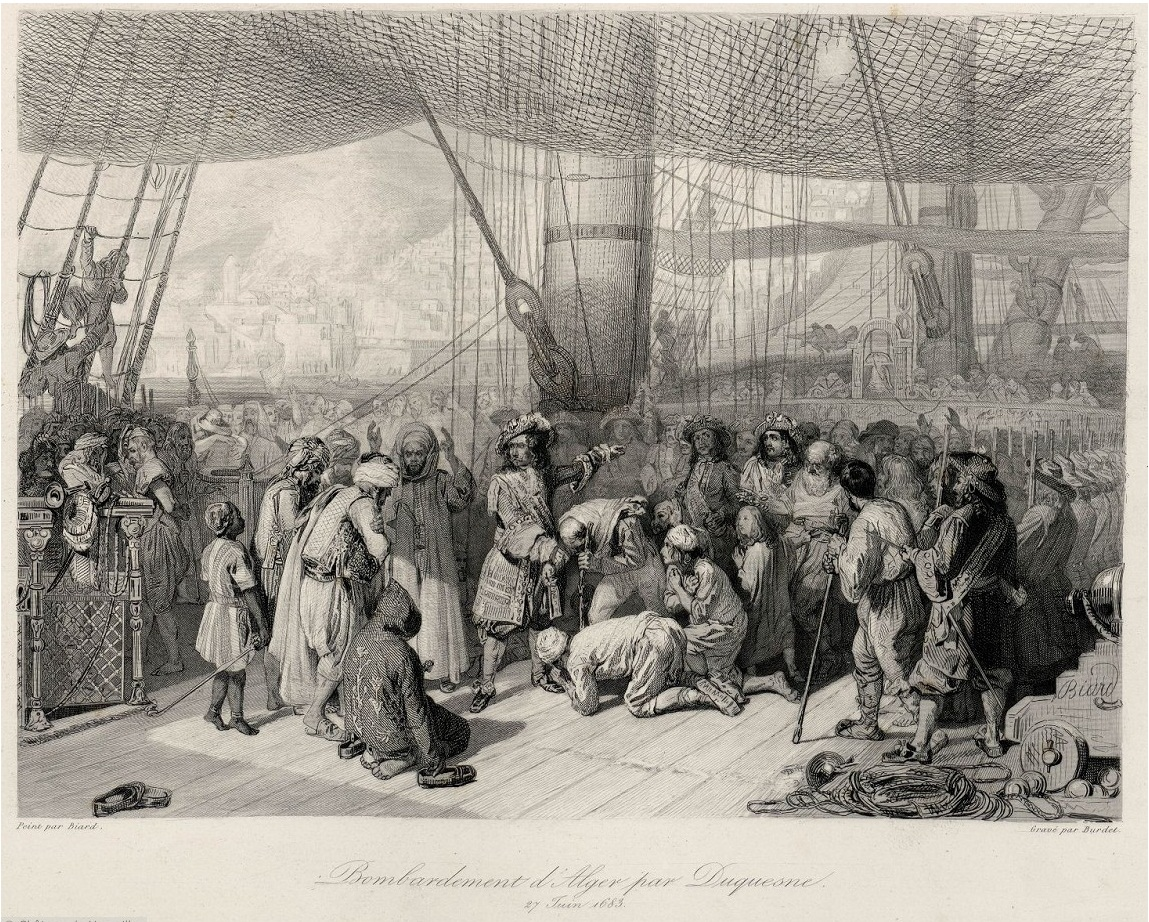
Naval attack on Algeria (1683) by Abraham Ducassin

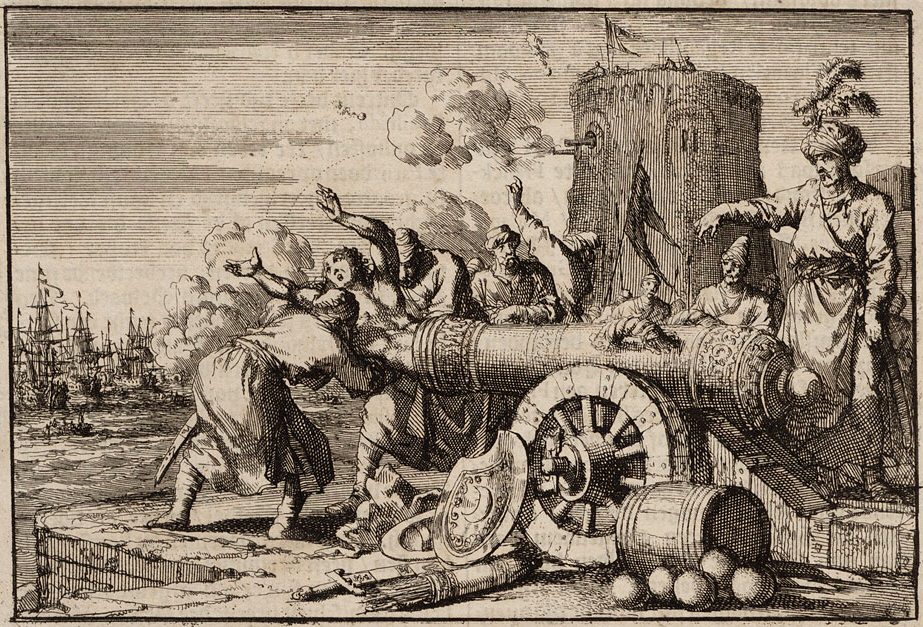
Naval attack on Algeria (1683) by Abraham Ducassin

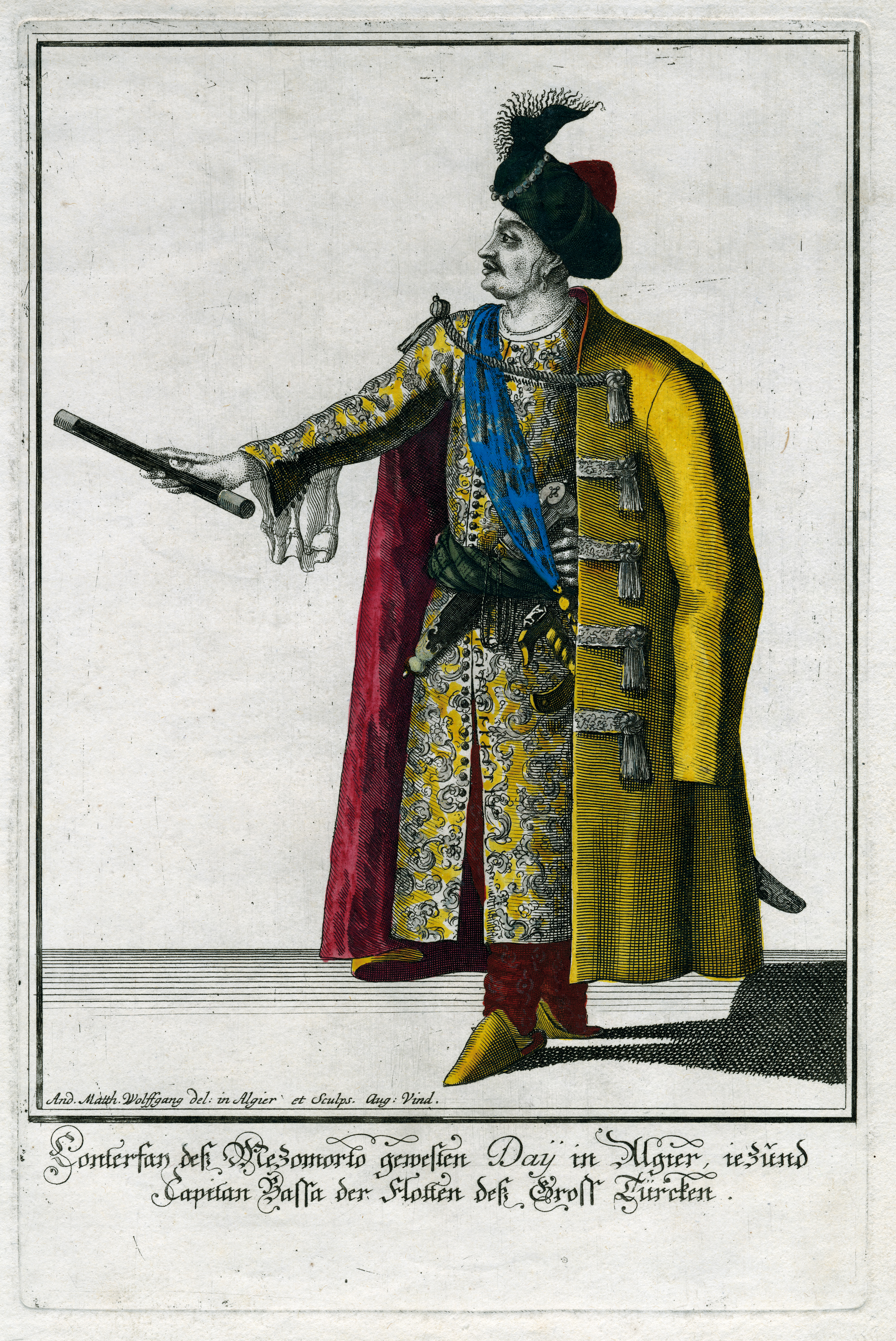
Dey Hussein Mezzo Murtaugh

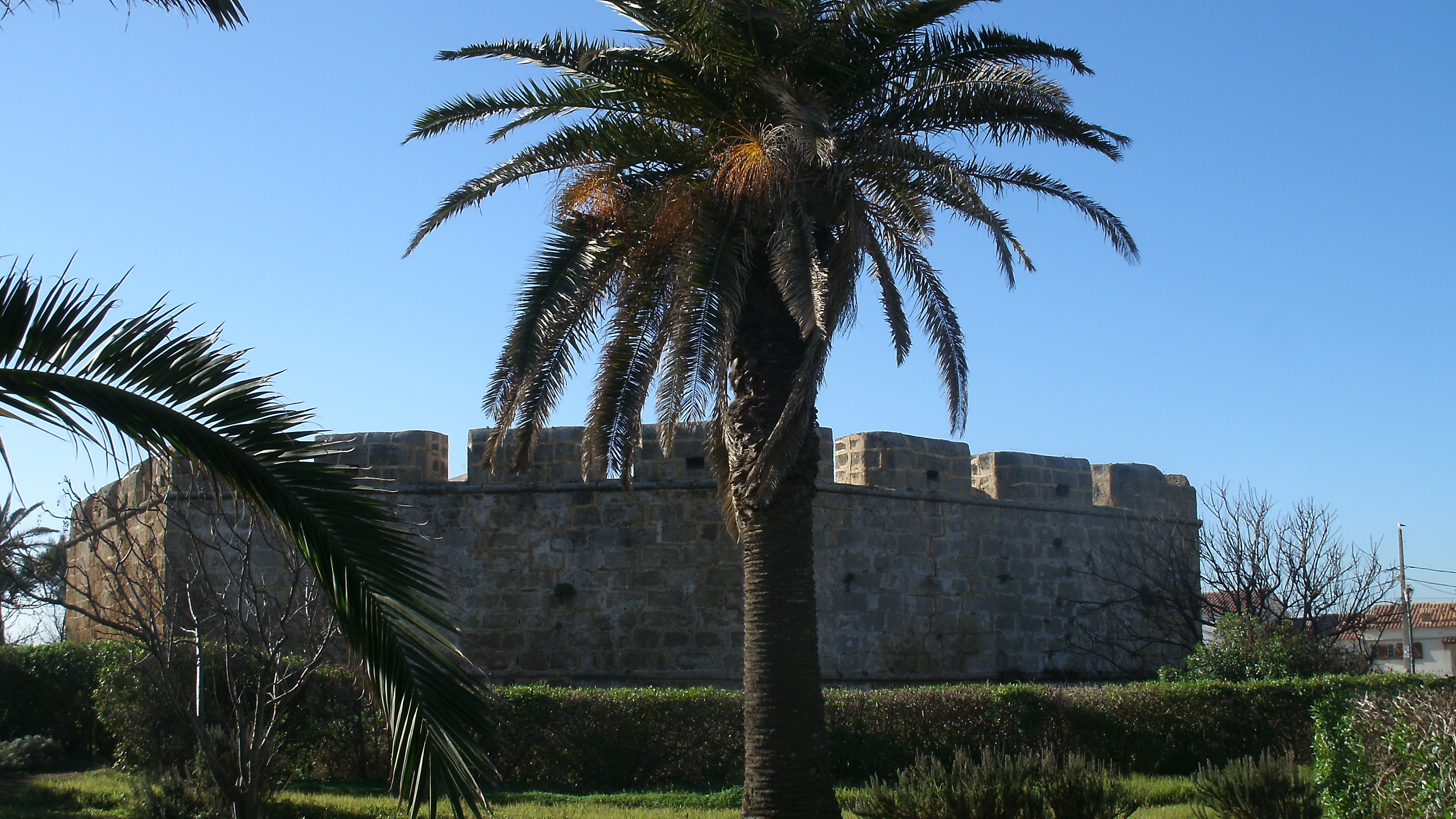
Fort Tamenfoust

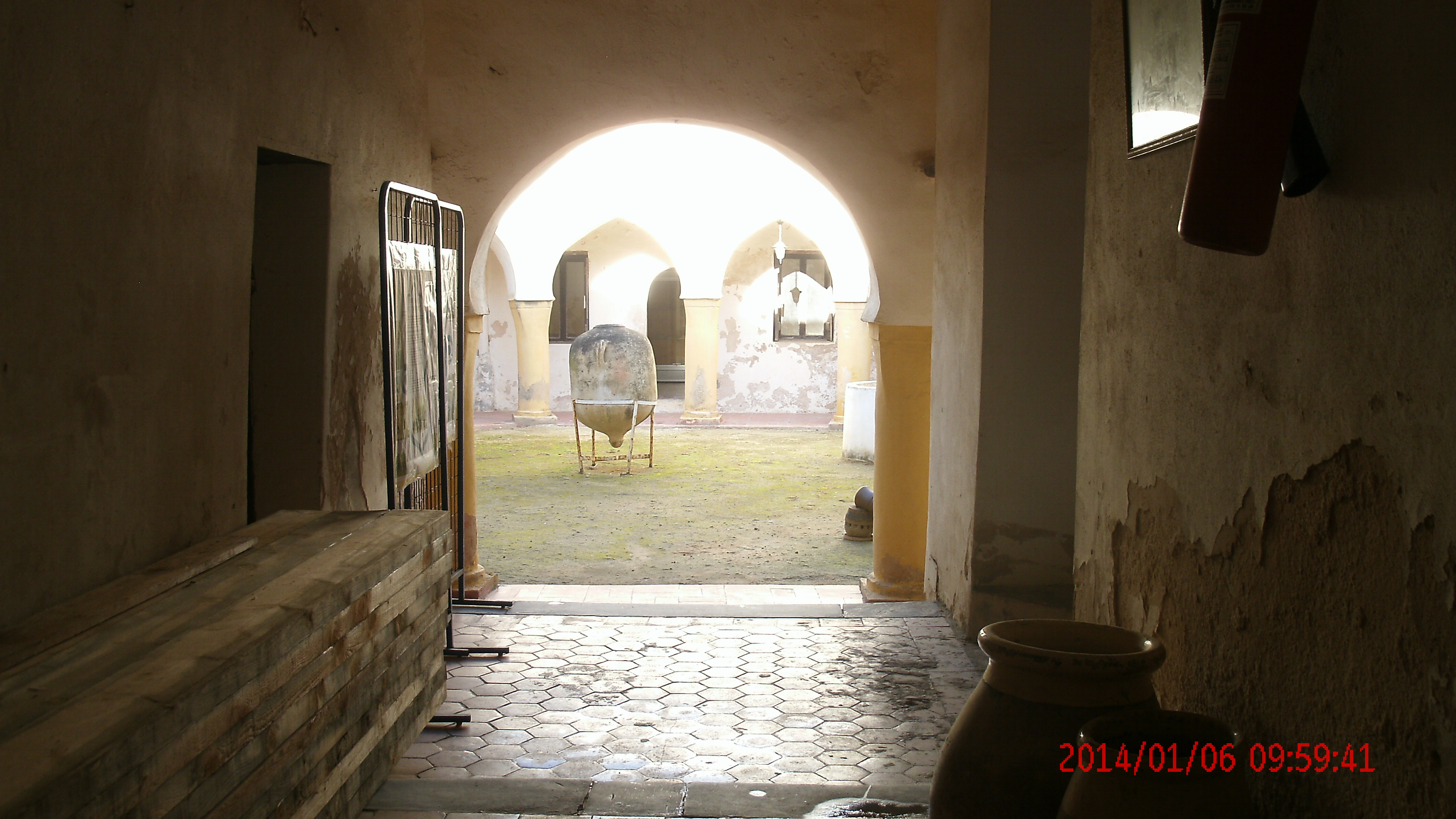
Tamenfoust Fortress Shed

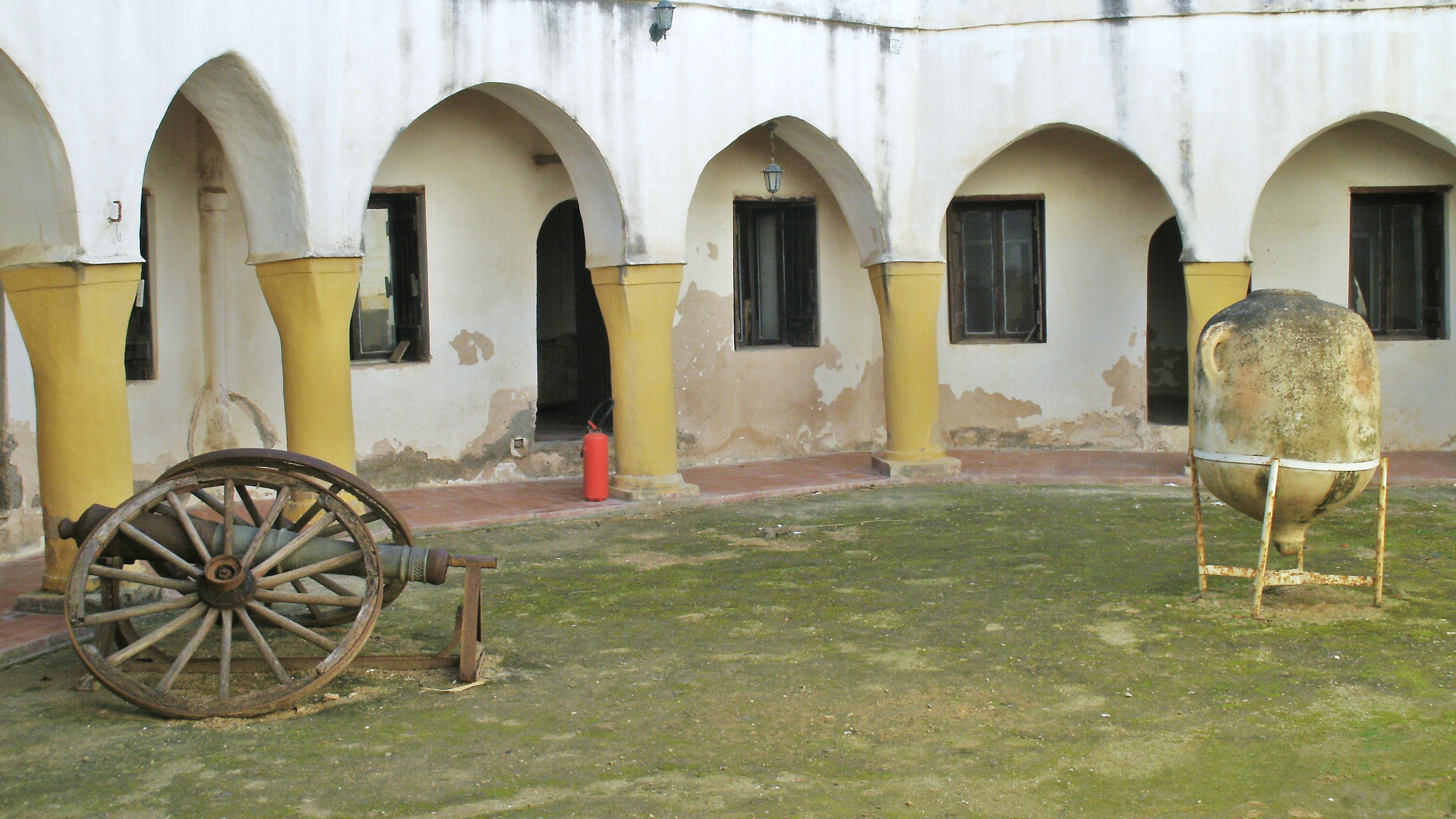
Tamenfoust Fortress Courtyard

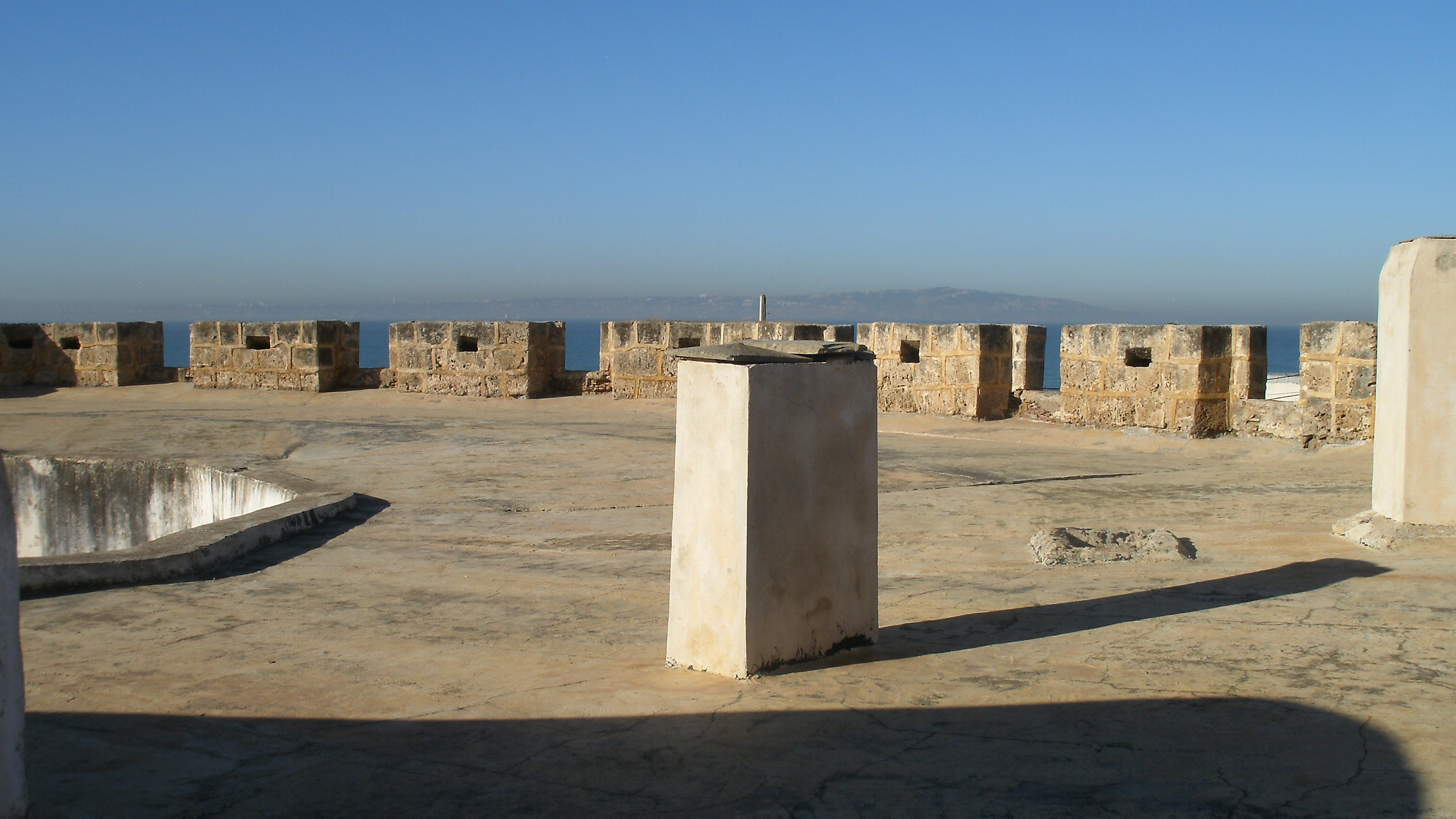
Tamenfoust Fortress Terrace

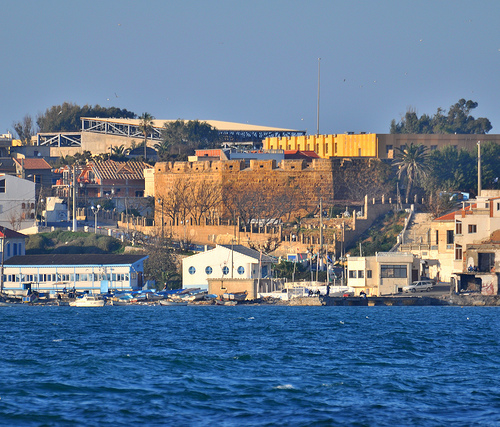
Tamentfoust Fort Beach

== See also ==
- Algiers expedition (1541)
- Bombardment of Algiers (1682)
- Bombardment of Algiers (1683)
- Algerian popular resistance against French invasion
