= El Marsa, Algiers =

El Marsa المرسى
- Municipality
- Commune of El Marsa
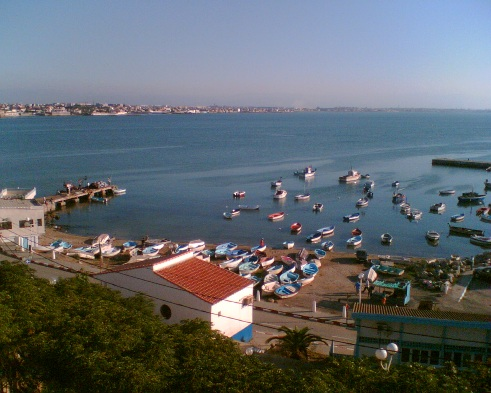
- El Marsa

- Location of El Marsa in the Algiers Province

- Location of El Marsa within Algeria
- Coordinates: 36.8111111°N 3.2555556°E
- Country: Algeria
- Province: Algiers Province
- District: Dar El Beïda District

Government
  - PMA president: belhadj hassen (2012–2017)

Area
  - Total: 3.9 km^{2} (1.5 sq mi)

Population (2008)
  - Total: 12,100
  - Density: 3,100/km^{2} (8,000/sq mi)
- Time zone: UTC+01 (CET)
- Postal code: 16111
- ONS code: 1640

El Marsa is a town in Algiers Province, Algeria. The population is 11,860.

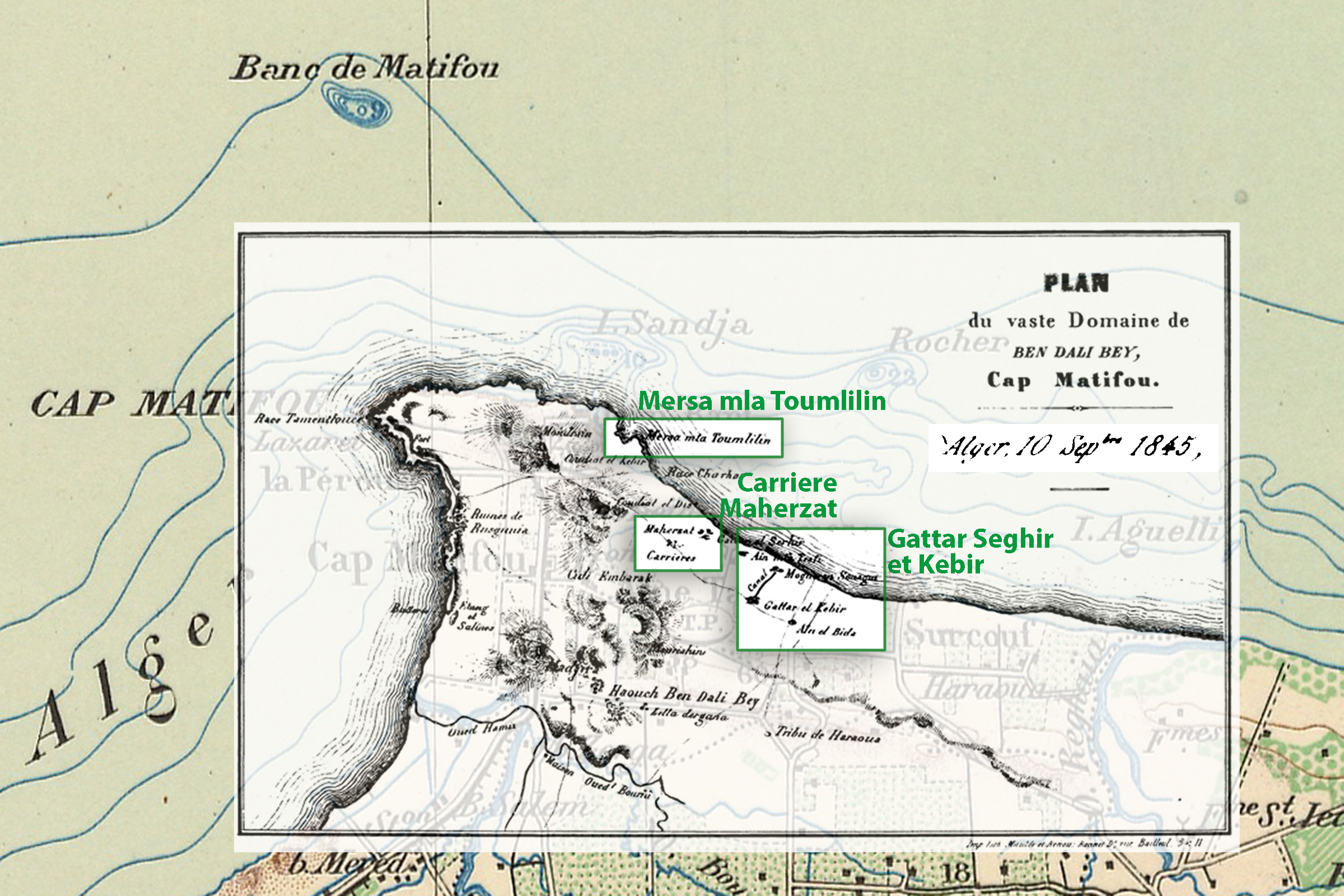
Map of the El-Marsa's vicinity around 1845

== Description by Louis Adrien Berbrugger, 1837 ==
As described by Louis Adrien Berbrugger at the very beginning of French colonisation, the Matifou region, although unknown to most of the inhabitants of Algiers, deserved neither the obscurity nor the neglect that was often associated with it. These observations could be supported by the notes collected during an extended stay at Fort Matifou in 1837, supplemented during several subsequent excursions and recently revised during a week devoted to the rediscovery of this fascinating region. Although these notes were originally intended for a book on African archaeology, the possibility of imminent colonisation projects at Cape Matifou prompted their publication in order to share the information gathered at the site.

Before delving into the current description of Cape Matifou, a brief review of its past was in order. According to Berbrugger's writings, Latin inscriptions discovered at Matifou, as well as references in ancient documents such as Antonin's Itinerary, attest to the existence of the Roman colony of Rusgunia, the ruins of which are still visible. Rusgunia, a Berber word Latinised by the Romans, evokes the "Cape of Sleep" or "Cape of the Sleepers", in reference to a local legend. Today, the locals call this cape Race-Tament-Fouce, which has been changed to Matifou.

As for access to Matifou, there were two main routes open to travellers: sea or land. According to Berbrugger's writings, the first, although more direct, was subject to the vagaries of the wind, which often diverted ships towards Pointe Pescade. The second, which left Algiers via the Bab-Azoun Gate towards the Maison-Carrée, offered two different routes. The first, via the Rassauta and Hadjira fords, was safer but longer, while the second, via the Bordj-el-Kifan route, was shorter but involved risks associated with the quicksand at the mouth of the Oued El-Khemice.

According to Berbrugger, the Gulf of Algiers and the Gulf of Bengüt, in which the Matifou region was situated, were like two semicircles joined together, delimiting a distinct territory whose nature, left to itself, tended to isolate it from the surrounding regions. Only one tribe lived there, the Haraouas, who exploited the land between the hills and the Mediterranean. According to his writings, the region of Rusgunia, although abandoned by the Romans, was rehabilitated by them because of its excellent anchorage at Cape Matifou, a rare advantage on this steep coast.

According to Berbrugger's observations, the Matifou plain, dominated by the Turkish fort and the anchorage, was less wild than the Bengut plain, but still characterised by its vast expanses of scrubland. The forest was managed by controlled fires, which provided tender shoots for the local animals. On the other hand, despite its natural fertility, there was no trace of cultivation as European agriculture clashed with local practices.

The region is full of ruins that bear witness to its turbulent past. According to Berbrugger, Roman remains dotted the landscape of Rusgunia, from ancient buildings to tombs and aqueducts. According to his writings, the Maherzat quarries, mistaken by the locals for Christian ruins, revealed terraces dug by the Romans to extract the stones, offering a spectacle reminiscent of Cyclopean constructions.

According to Berbrugger, beyond the archaeological discovery, Matifou offered development prospects with its vast expanses and unexploited agricultural potential. According to his writings, the planned colonisation projects promised to reveal more of the region's hidden treasures while contributing to its economic and cultural revival.

== Postal Code ==
The postal code is 16020.
