= Algiers =

Capital and largest city of Algeria

Algiers: الجزائر; ⴷⵣⴰⵢⵔ
- Capital city
- Capital City of Algiers
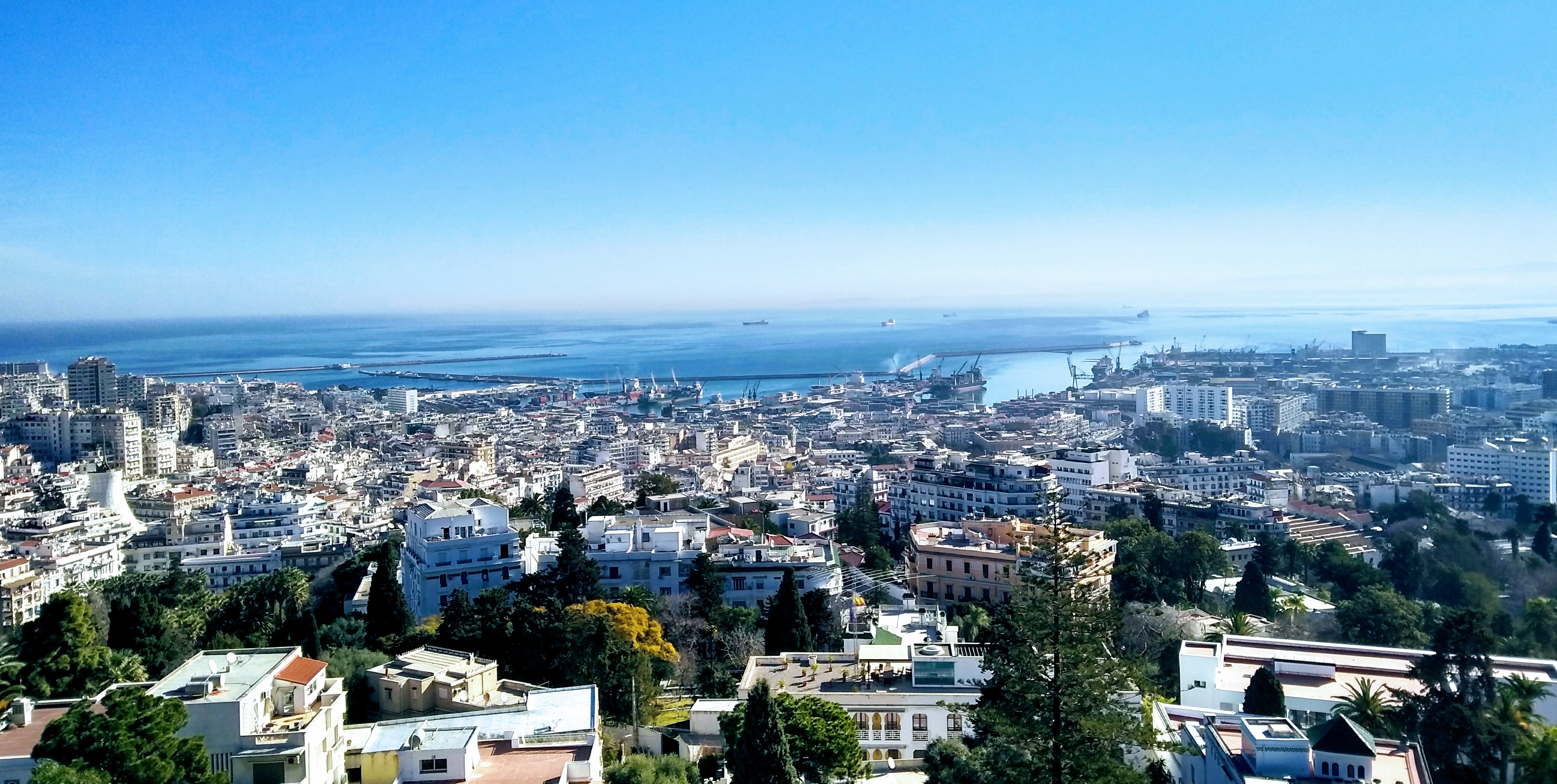
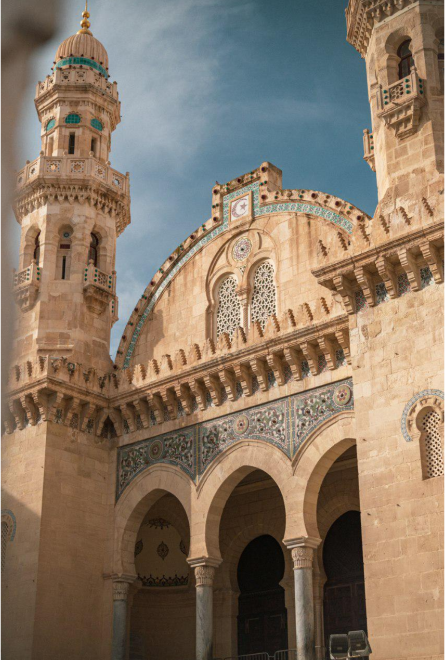
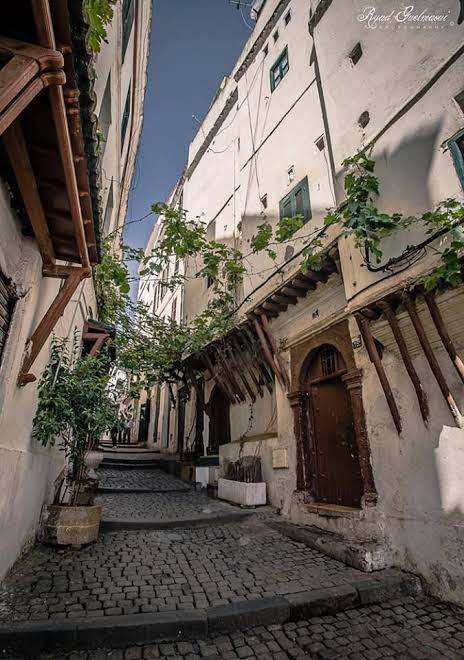
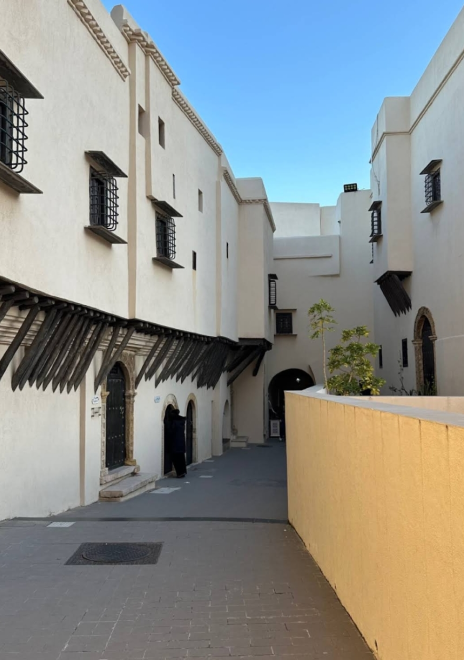
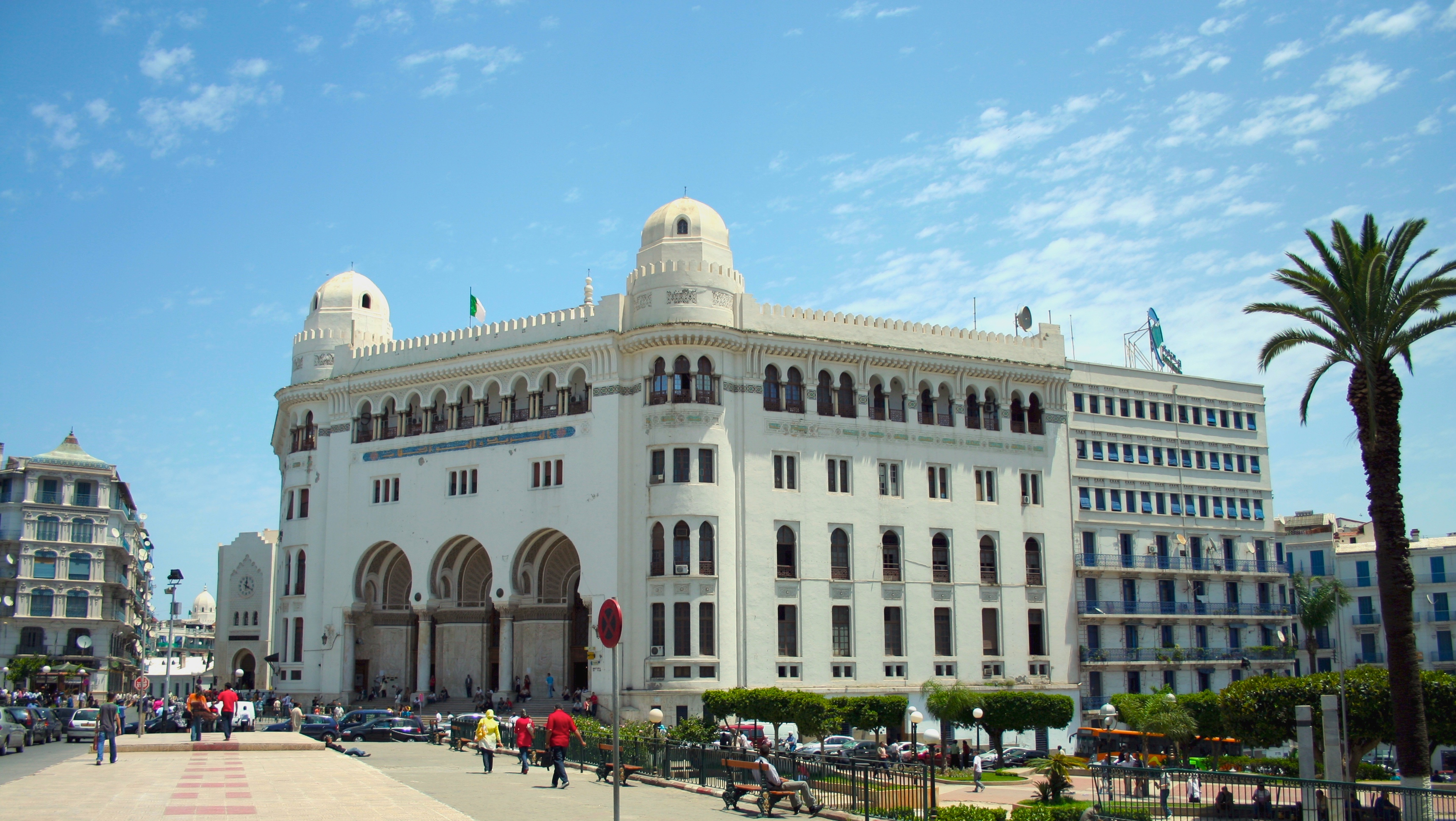
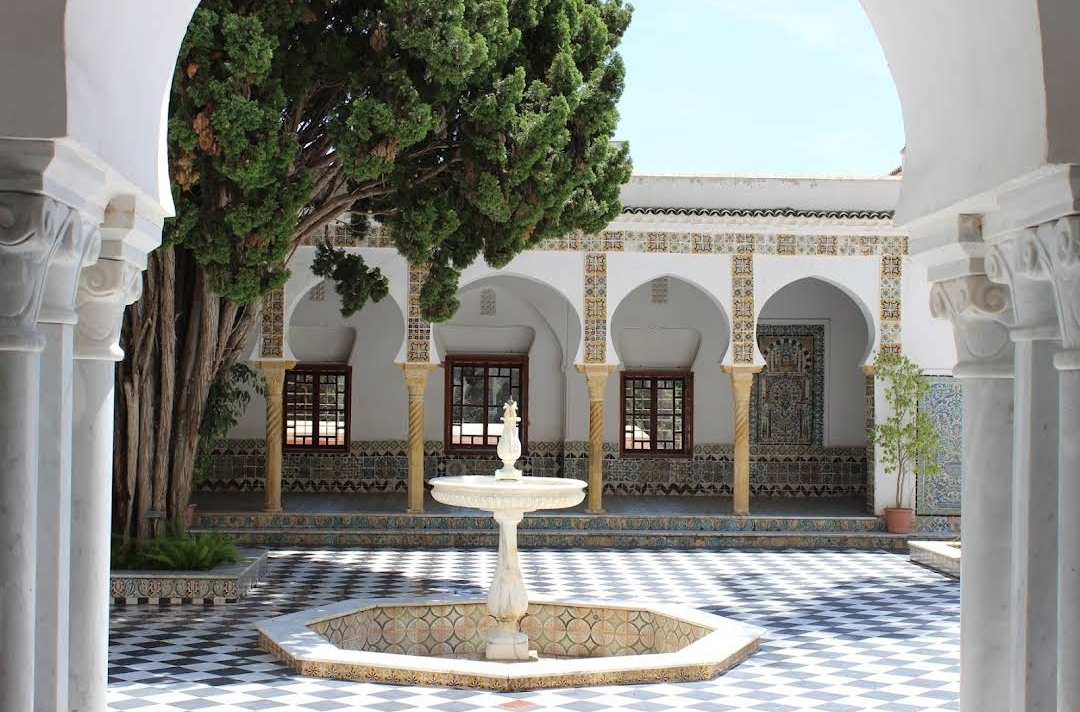
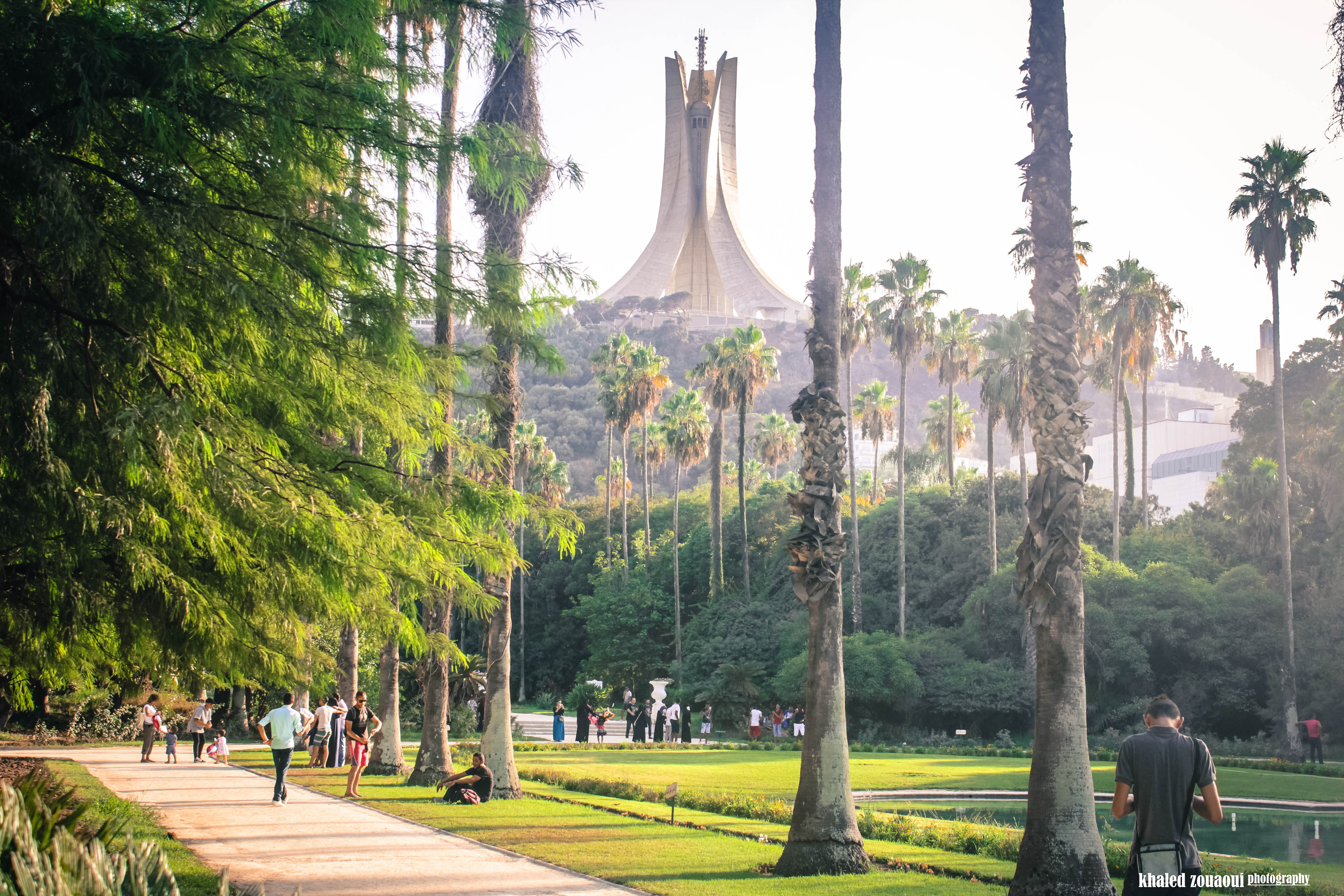
- Skyline of Algiers Djamaa Ketchaoua Casbah of Algiers Raïs' Palace Algiers Central Post Office Notre-Dame d'Afrique Bardo National Museum Maqam Echahid and Botanical Garden Hamma

- Coat of arms
- Nicknames: Algiers the White; Algiers the Dazzling; The White City
- Location in Algeria Location in Mediterranean Location in Africa
- Coordinates: 36°43′57″N 03°05′14″E
- Country: Algeria
- Province: Algiers
- Incorporated: 972
- Founder: Buluggin ibn Ziri

Government
  - Mayor: Mahdia Benghalia (since 2021)

Area
  - Urban: 443 km^{2} (171 sq mi)
  - Metro: 1,190 km^{2} (460 sq mi)
- Highest elevation: 424 m (1,391 ft)
- Lowest elevation: 2 m (6.6 ft)

Population (2025)
  - Capital city: 4,325,000
  - Rank: 1st in Algeria; 10th in the Arab world 19th in Africa
  - Urban: 3,004,000
  - Metro: 4,325,000
  - Metro density: 7,012/km^{2} (18,160/sq mi)
- Time zone: UTC+01:00 (WAT)
- Postal codes: 16000–16132
- Area code: (+213) 021
- Licence plate: 16
- Climate: Csa

UNESCO World Heritage Site
- Official name: Casbah of Algiers
- Type: Cultural
- Criteria: ii, v
- Designated: 1992 (16th session)
- Reference no.: 565
- Region: List of World Heritage Sites in North Africa

Algiers (/ælˈdʒɪərz/ al-JEERZ; Arabic: الجزائر, romanized: al-Jazāʾir, pronounced [al.d͡ʒazaːʔir], locally [(ɪ)ˈd͡ːzaːjir]; French: Alger, pronounced [alʒe]; Algerian Tamazight: ⴷⵣⴰⵢⵔ, romanized: Dzayer), officially Capital City of Algiers (Arabic: الجزائر العاصمة, romanized: al-Jazāʾir al-ʿĀṣima; Algerian Tamazight: ⴷⵣⴰⵢⵔ ⵜⴰⵎⴰⵏⴰⵖⵜ, romanized: Dzayer Tamaneɣt), is the capital and largest city of Algeria, located on the Mediterranean Sea in the north-central portion of the country. In 2025, an estimated 4.325 million people resided within the urban area. Algiers is the third-largest city on the Mediterranean, the tenth-largest city in the Arab world, and the 19th-largest city in Africa by population. Algiers is the capital of the Algiers Province; it extends over many communes without having its own separate governing body. It extends along the Bay of Algiers surrounded by the Mitidja Plain and major mountain ranges. Its favorable location made it the center of Ottoman and French influences for the region, shaping it to be a diverse metropolis.

Algiers was formally founded in 972 AD by Buluggin ibn Ziri, though its history goes back to between 1200 and 250 BC as a Phoenician trading settlement. Over time, it came under the control of several powers, including Numidia, the Roman Empire, and various Islamic caliphates. In 1516, it became the capital of the Ottoman Regency of Algiers, a status it held until the French invasion in 1830, after which it served as the capital of French Algeria. During World War II, it briefly functioned as the administrative center of Free France from 1942 to 1944 before returning to French colonial rule. It has remained the capital of the modern Algerian state since the Algerian Revolution in 1962.

Algiers is the main tourist destination in Algeria, known for its numerous museums, art galleries, and cultural institutions. Most notable is the historic Casbah, a UNESCO World Heritage Site featuring traditional Algerian, Ottoman, and Andalusian architecture. The city also contains a larger French-built section that showcases diverse architectural styles and trends. Commonly referred to as al bidha ("the white") for its whitewashed buildings, Algiers blends colonial and indigenous urban influences. It hosted the 1975 Mediterranean Games and various major international sporting events, and it serves as the seat of the Consultative Council of the Arab Maghreb Union. Numerous Algerian multinational companies and institutions are based in the city, such as Sonatrach Petroleum Corporation, Air Algérie, and Bank of Algeria.

== Toponymy and name origin ==
The name of the city in Arabic is al-Jazāʾir (الجزائر), and in Berber Dzayer (ⴷⵣⴰⵢⵔ). Due to its similarity to the name of the country in local languages, it is officially specified as "Capital City of Algiers" (Arabic: الجزائر العاصمة, romanized: al-Jazāʾir al-ʿĀṣima; Berber: ⴷⵣⴰⵢⵔ ⵜⴰⵎⴰⵏⴰⵖⵜ, romanized: Dzayer Tamaneɣt; both lit. 'Algiers the Capital').

The Arabic name al-Jazāʾir (الجزائر), means 'the Islands', referring originally to the 4 main islands off the western cape where people settled, and which were eventually connected to the mainland in 1525 AD via a pier now named Kheireddine pier.

al-Jazāʾir is a truncated form of the name that was used first by Buluggin ibn Ziri when he established the modern city in 972 AD (on the ruins of the Punic city of Icosium) which was Jazāʾir Banī Mazghanna (جزائر بني مزغانة), meaning 'islands of Banu Mazghanna', this term was used by the Hammadid dynasty as well as early medieval geographers such as Muhammad al-Idrisi and Yaqut al-Hamawi. French and Catalan Alger come from the Arabic name, al-Jazāʾir. During Ottoman rule, the name of the capital, al-Jazāʾir, was extended over the entire country, giving it the English name Algeria derived from the French name Algérie.

In classical antiquity, the ancient Greeks knew the town as Ikósion (Ancient Greek: Ἰκόσιον), which was Latinized as Icosium under Roman rule. The Greeks explained the name as coming from their word for 'twenty' (εἴκοσι, eíkosi), supposedly because it had been founded by 20 companions of Hercules when he visited the Atlas Mountains during his labors.

Algiers is also known as el-Behdja (البهجة, 'the Joyous') El Mahrussa ('the Good-guarded'), or "Algiers the White" (French: Alger la Blanche) for its whitewashed buildings.

The local name Dzayer is the origin of the demonym dziri, which could be connected with the Zirids, the founders of the city, as suggested by Tassadit Yacine. Academic discussions often omit that the name that both Arabic- and Berber-speaking inhabitants have always given to their city is Dzayer. However, Dzayer raises the question of the origin of the affricate [dz], which neither Arabic nor Berber possesses in its consonantal system. It is suggested that the sound /z/, replacing /ʒ/, is a persistent trace of Berber. Since, as mentioned, the sound is found in the name of Zirids, some imagine that Dzayer is the result of the contraction of /aθˈziri/, meaning 'those of Ziri'. In addition, /z/ is represented by the Tifinagh letter ⵣ, which is a symbol of Berber identity and culture and is prominently featured on their flag.

== History ==
Timeline of Algiers (Icosium)
Historical affiliations

Phoenicia and Punicia pre 202 BC
Numidia 202 BC–104 BC
Mauretania 104 BC-42 AD
Roman Empire 42-435
Vandal Kingdom 435–534
Byzantine Empire 534-700s
Umayyad Caliphate 700s–750
Abbasid Caliphate 750 AD-800
Aghlabids (As a vassal state of the Abbasids) 800 AD–909
Fatimid Caliphate 909–972
Zirid dynasty (As a vassal state of the Fatimid Caliphate) 972–1014
Hammadid dynasty 1014–1082
Almoravid Empire 1082–1151
Almohad Caliphate 1151–1235
Thaaliba, (tributary of the Tlemcen) 1235–1516
Regency of Algiers, (tributary of the Ottoman Empire) 1516–1830
France, (French Algeria) 1830–1962
Algeria 1962–present

=== Early history ===
The city's history is believed to date back to 1200 BC, but it was a small settlement without any significance until around the 3rd century BC when "Ikosim" became a small port town in Carthage where Phoenicians were trading with other Mediterranean ports. After the Battle of Cirta, Numidia annexed the town along with its neighboring regions at around 202 BC, after which the Punic Wars started weakening the Berber nation.

In 104 BC, following the capture, and execution in Rome, of Jughurta, the western half of his nation was given to Mauretania under the rule of Bocchus I. At around 42 AD, Claudius divided Mauretania into two provinces, Mauretania Caesariensis that included Icosium as one of its towns; and the second, Mauretania Tingitana, both deemed Roman Municipiums. They were given Latin rights by the emperor Vespasian. In 371-373 AD, Mauretania revolted with the help of Firmus, in hopes of establishing an independent state. Icosium was raided and damaged. Some clues show the presence of bishops in the region at this time.

In 435 AD, the Vandal Kingdom took control of northern Africa along the coasts of today's Tunisia and Algeria. The Western Roman Empire that was ruling the area allowed the Vandals to settle when it became clear that they could not be defeated by Roman military forces. Though the city was damaged again due to the fighting between the two armies, it was still slowly growing in population.

=== Medieval history ===
In 534 AD, the Vandal kingdom was subjugated by the general Belisarius of the Eastern Roman Empire, making Icosium a part of the empire. In the early 7th century, "Beni Mezghenna" who are a Berber tribe belonging to the Sanhaja as cited by Ibn Khaldoun, settled on the plains of Icosium and the surrounding areas. Shortly after, in the late 7th century, the Muslim conquest of the Maghreb brought the Umayyad Caliphate into the region, but resistance from Berber forces led by Kahina and Kusaila persisted in the 680s, and opposed the advancing Islamic armies. However, Hassan ibn al-Nu'man and Musa ibn Nusayr later defeated both Berber leaders, killing Kusaila at the Battle of Mamma (688) and killing Dihya at the Battle of Tabarka (702), leading to the subjugation of the Berber tribes, bringing Islamic rule into North Africa. The Abbasid Caliphate succeeded Umayyad Caliphate at around 750 AD. Independence movements across the Maghreb resulted in the breaking of two nations, the Idrisid dynasty and the Aghlabid Emirate but acted as agents of the Abbasids in Baghdad. Icosium fell into the hands of Aghlabids and abandoned the town. They were then overthrown by the Fatimids in 909 AD, who went on to control all of Ifriqiya by 969 AD.

The present city was re-founded in 972 AD by Buluggin ibn Ziri, who was appointed by the Faṭimid caliph al-Muʿizz as governor of al-Qayrawān and any other territory of his nation that the Zirid Dynasty might reclaim from its enemies, the Zenata tribesmen. His state accordingly expanded its boundaries westward. In approximately 1014 AD, under the reign of Badis ibn al-Mansur, the dynasty was divided between the Zirids at al-Qayrawan in the east, and the Hammadid dynasty at Qal'at Bani Hammad; "Jazaʾir Banī Mazghanna", commonly known as "Algiers" as the new name of Icosium was absorbed into the Hammadid dynasty who in 1067 AD relocated to Béjaïa and carried on a lively trade while most of North Africa was under a state of anarchy.

In 1079 AD, Ibn Tashfin, a Sanhaja leader of the Almoravid Empire sent an army of 20,000 men from Marrakesh to push towards what is now Tlemcen to attack the "Banu Ya'la", the Zenata tribe occupying the area. Led by Mazdali ibn Tilankan, the army defeated the Banu Ya'la in battle near the valley of the Moulouya River and executed their commander, the son of Tlemcen's ruler. However, Mazdali ibn Tilankan did not push to Tlemcen right away as the city of Oujda was too strong to capture. Instead, Ibn Tashfin himself returned with an army in 1081 AD that captured Oujda and then conquered Tlemcen, massacring the Maghrawa forces there and their leader. He pressed on and by 1082 AD he had captured "Jazaʾir Banī Mazghanna".

In 1151 AD, Abd al-Mu'min launched an expedition to the east, conquering Béjaïa in August 1152, the capital of the Hammadids; on their way, Beni Mezghanna did not succumb and was now under the Almohad Caliphate's control. The caliphate suffered from states breaking out of its rule, most notably, the Kingdom of Tlemcen in 1235 AD. The town once again came under the dominion of the Ziyanid sultans of the Kingdom but experienced a large measure of independence under Thaaliba amirs who settled the Mitidja plain at around 1200 AD.

=== Early modern history ===
Illustration of the islets off the coast of Algiers before Pier "Kheireddine" was built.

The Kingdom of Tlemcen was the target of the Spanish Empire's and the Portuguese Empire's campaigns and conquests against its coasts, beginning in 1501 AD. However, Algiers continued to be of comparatively little importance until after the expulsion of the Moors from Spain, many of whom sought asylum in the city, after which the Spanish led by Pedro Navarro established a fortified base and garrison on one of the islets off the coast of Algiers, and named it "Peñón de Argel" or Peñón of Algiers. By that time, Algiers had an emir, Salim al-Thumi who had to "swear obedience and loyalty" to Ferdinand II of Aragon who also imposed a levy intended to suppress the Barbary pirates.

=== Ottoman rule ===
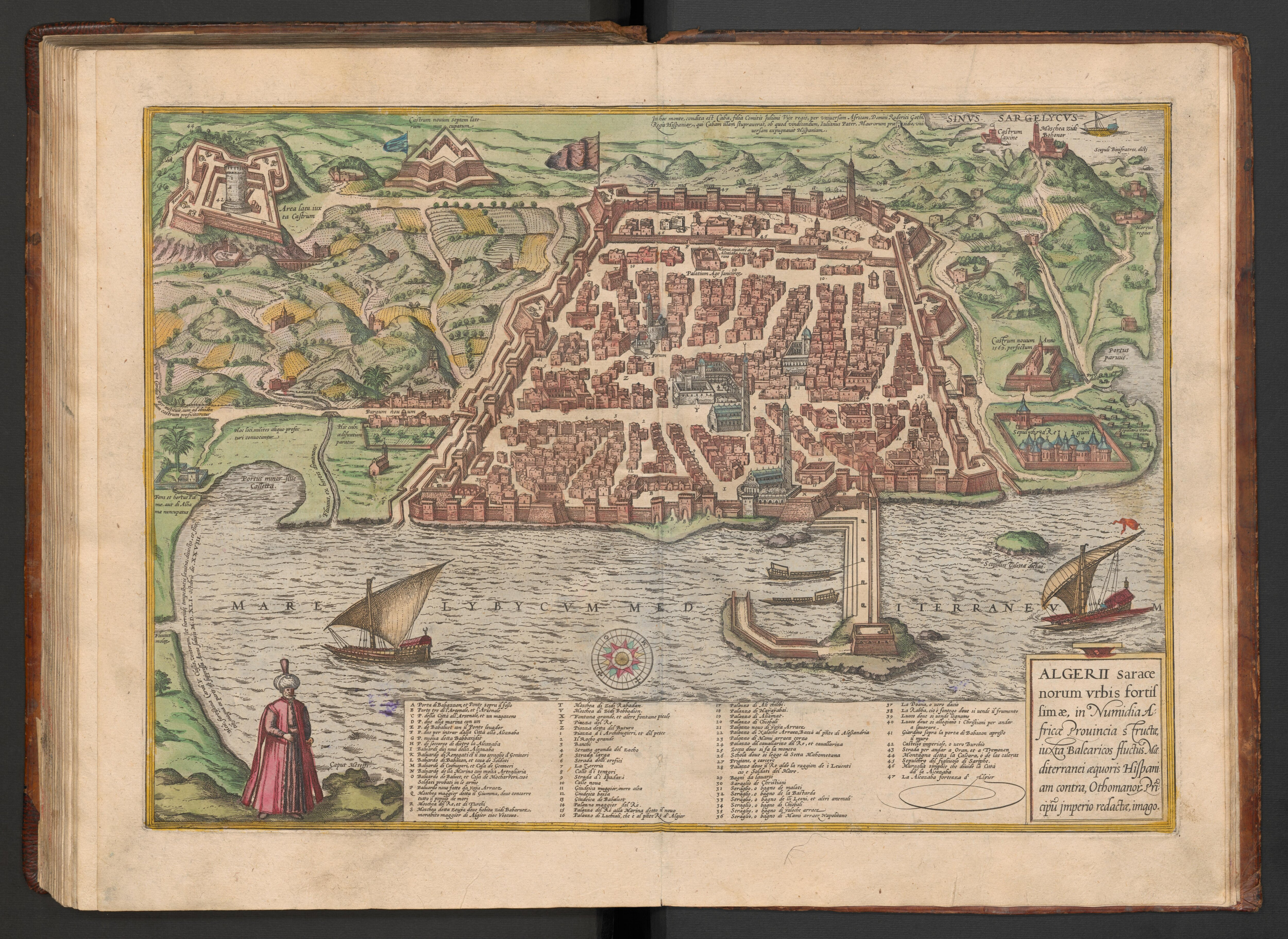
Algiers by Antonio Salamanca, circa 1540, published in Civitates Orbis Terrarum

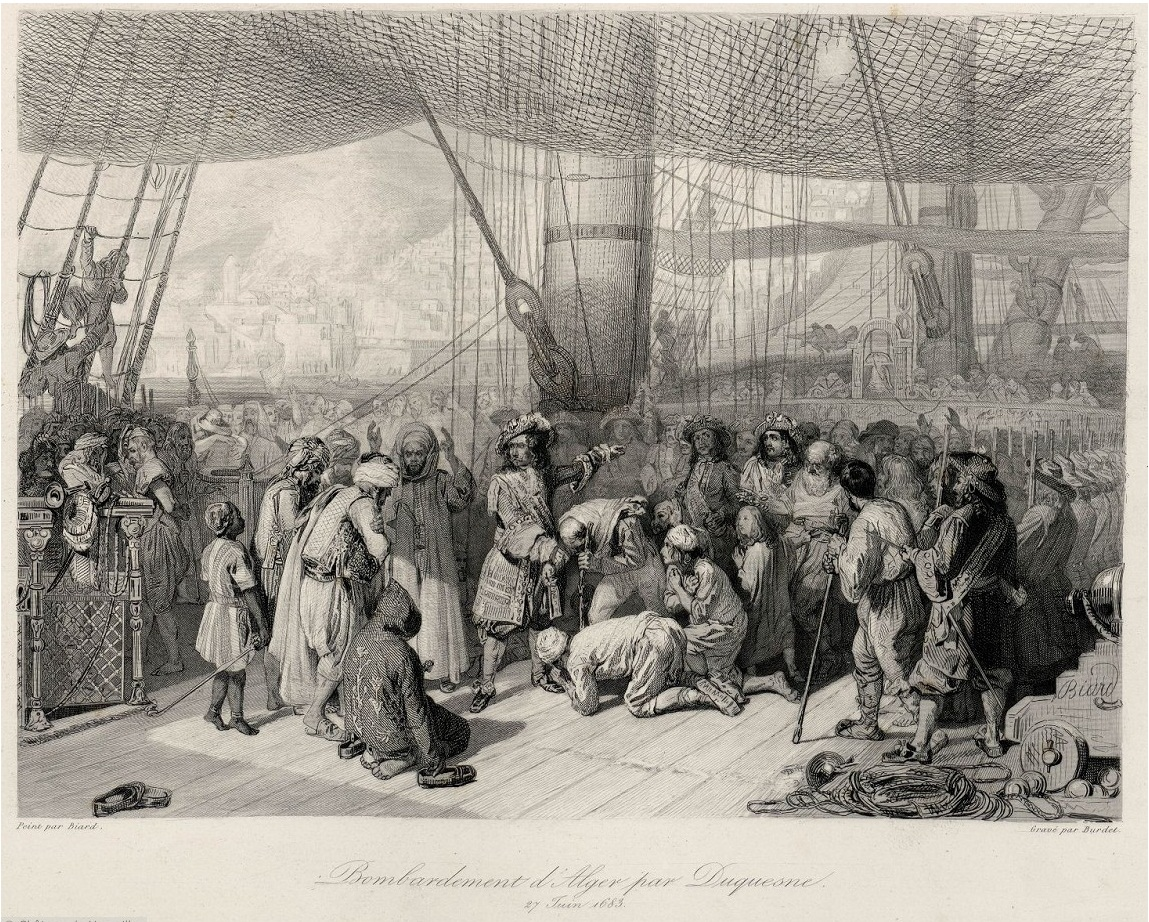
Abraham Duquesne delivering Christian captives in Algiers after the bombing in 1683.

In 1516, the amir of Algiers, Selim b. Teumi, invited the corsair brothers Oruç Reis and Hayreddin Barbarossa to expel the Spaniards. Oruç Reis came to Algiers, ordered the assassination of Selim, and seized the town and ousted the Spanish in the Capture of Algiers (1516). Hayreddin, succeeding Oruç after the latter was killed in battle against the Spaniards in the 1518 fall of Tlemcen, was the founder of the pashaluk, which subsequently became the beylik, of Algeria. Barbarossa lost Algiers in 1524 but regained it with the 1529 Capture of Peñón of Algiers, and then formally invited the Sultan Suleiman the Magnificent to accept sovereignty over the territory and to annex Algiers to the Ottoman Empire.

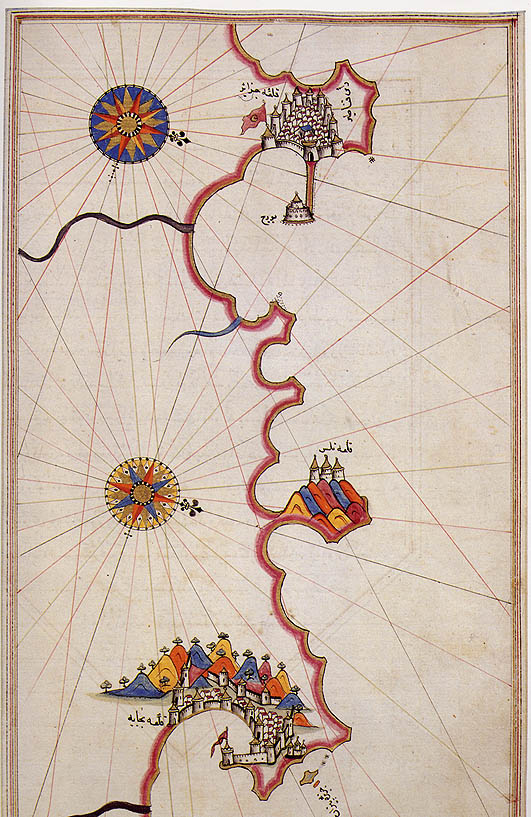
Historic map of Algiers by Piri Reis

Algiers from this time became the chief seat of the Barbary pirates. In October 1541 in the Algiers expedition, the King of Spain and Charles V, Holy Roman Emperor sought to capture the city, but a storm destroyed a great number of his ships, and his army of some 30,000, chiefly made up of Spaniards, was defeated by the Algerians under their pasha, Hassan.

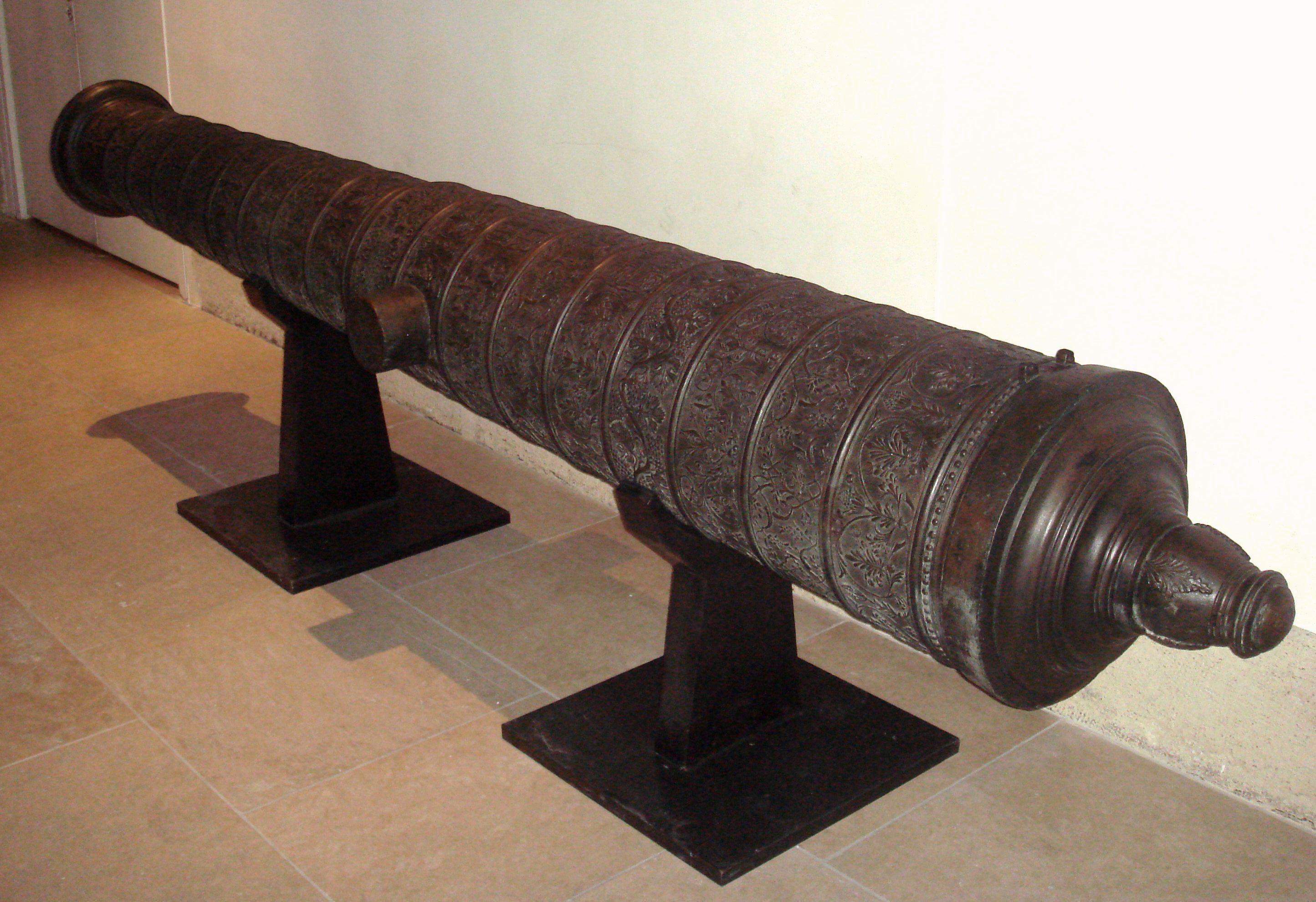
Ornate Ottoman cannon found in Algiers on 8 October 1581 by Ca'fer el-Mu'allim. Length: 385 cm, cal:178 mm, weight: 2910 kg, stone projectile. Seized by France during the invasion of Algiers in 1830. Army Museum, Paris.

Formally part of the Ottoman Empire but essentially free from Ottoman control, starting in the 16th century Algiers turned to piracy and ransoming. Due to its location on the periphery of both the Ottoman and European economic spheres, and depending for its existence on a Mediterranean that was increasingly controlled by European shipping, backed by European navies, piracy became the primary economic activity. Repeated attempts were made by various nations to subdue the pirates that disturbed shipping in the western Mediterranean and engaged in slave raids as far north as Iceland. By the 17th century, up to 40% of the city's 100,000 inhabitants were enslaved Europeans. The United States fought two wars (the First and Second Barbary Wars) over Algiers' attacks on shipping.

Among the notable people held for ransom was the future Spanish novelist, Miguel de Cervantes, who was held captive in Algiers for almost five years, and wrote two plays set in Algiers of the period. The primary source for knowledge of Algiers of this period, since there are no contemporary local sources, is the Topografía e historia general de Argel (1612, but written earlier), published by Diego de Haedo, but whose authorship is disputed. This work describes in detail the city, the behavior of its inhabitants, and its military defenses, and expresses the unsuccessful hope of facilitating an attack by Spain so as to end the piracy.

A significant number of renegades lived in Algiers at the time, Christians converted voluntarily to Islam, many fleeing the law or other problems at home. Once converted to Islam, they were safe in Algiers. Many occupied positions of authority, such as Samson Rowlie, an Englishman who became Treasurer of Algiers.

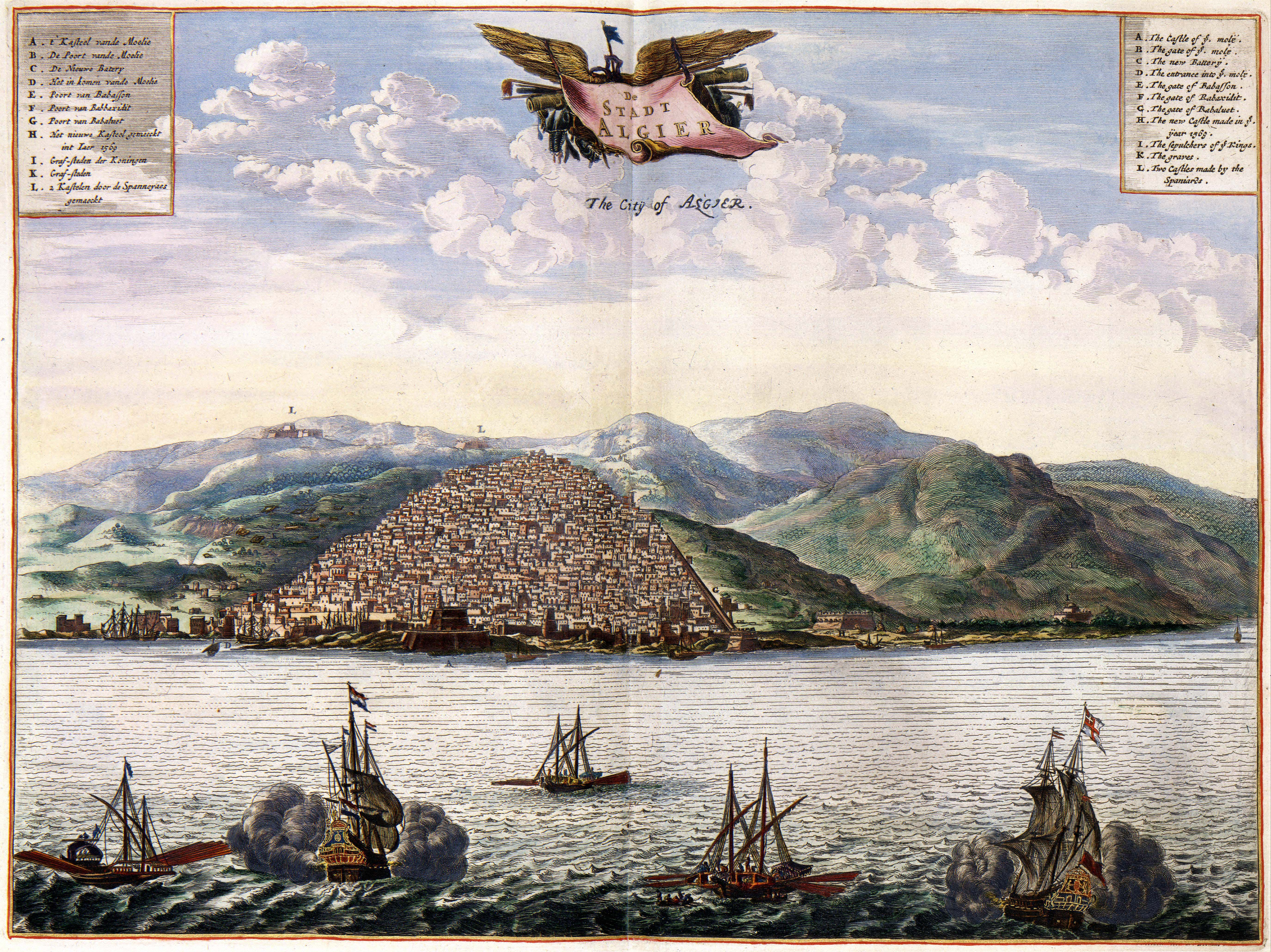
The Casbah of Algiers under Ottoman rule in 1690.

The city under Ottoman control was enclosed by a wall on all sides, including along the seafront. In this wall, five gates allowed access to the city, with five roads from each gate dividing the city and meeting in front of the Ketchaoua Mosque. In 1556, a citadel, Palace of the Dey was constructed at the highest point in the wall. A major road running north to south divided the city in two: The upper city (al-Gabal, or 'the mountain') which consisted of about fifty small quarters of Andalusian, Jewish, Moorish and Kabyle communities, and the lower city (al-Wata, or 'the plains') which was the administrative, military and commercial centre of the city, mostly inhabited by Ottoman Turkish dignitaries and other upper-class families.

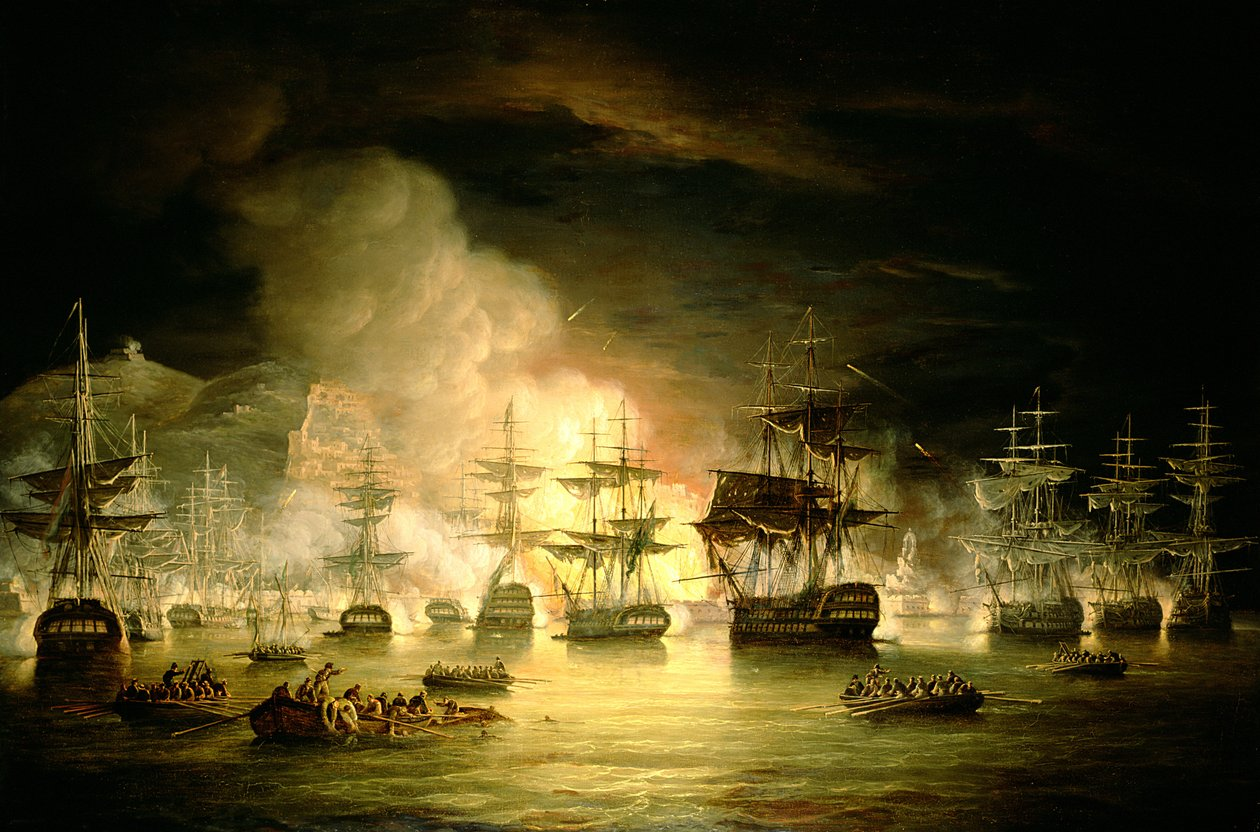
The bombardment of Algiers under Viscount Exmouth, August 1816, painted by Thomas Luny

On 27 August 1816, the Bombardment of Algiers took place city by a British squadron under Lord Exmouth (a descendant of Thomas Pellew, taken in an Algerian slave raid in 1715), assisted by men-of-war from the Kingdom of the Netherlands, destroying the corsair fleet harboured in Algiers.

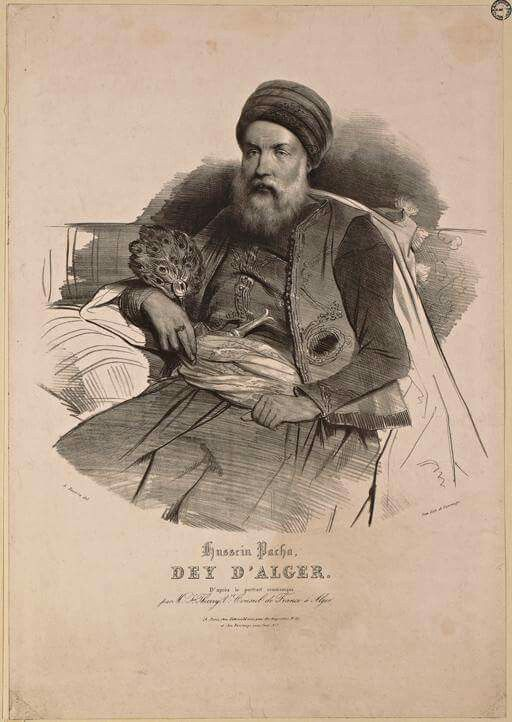
Portrait of Hussein Dey, the last Dey of the Deylik of Algiers.

France and the Regency of Algiers had a commercial–political conflict called the Bakri-Busnach affair which has been bothering both nations in the 19th century.

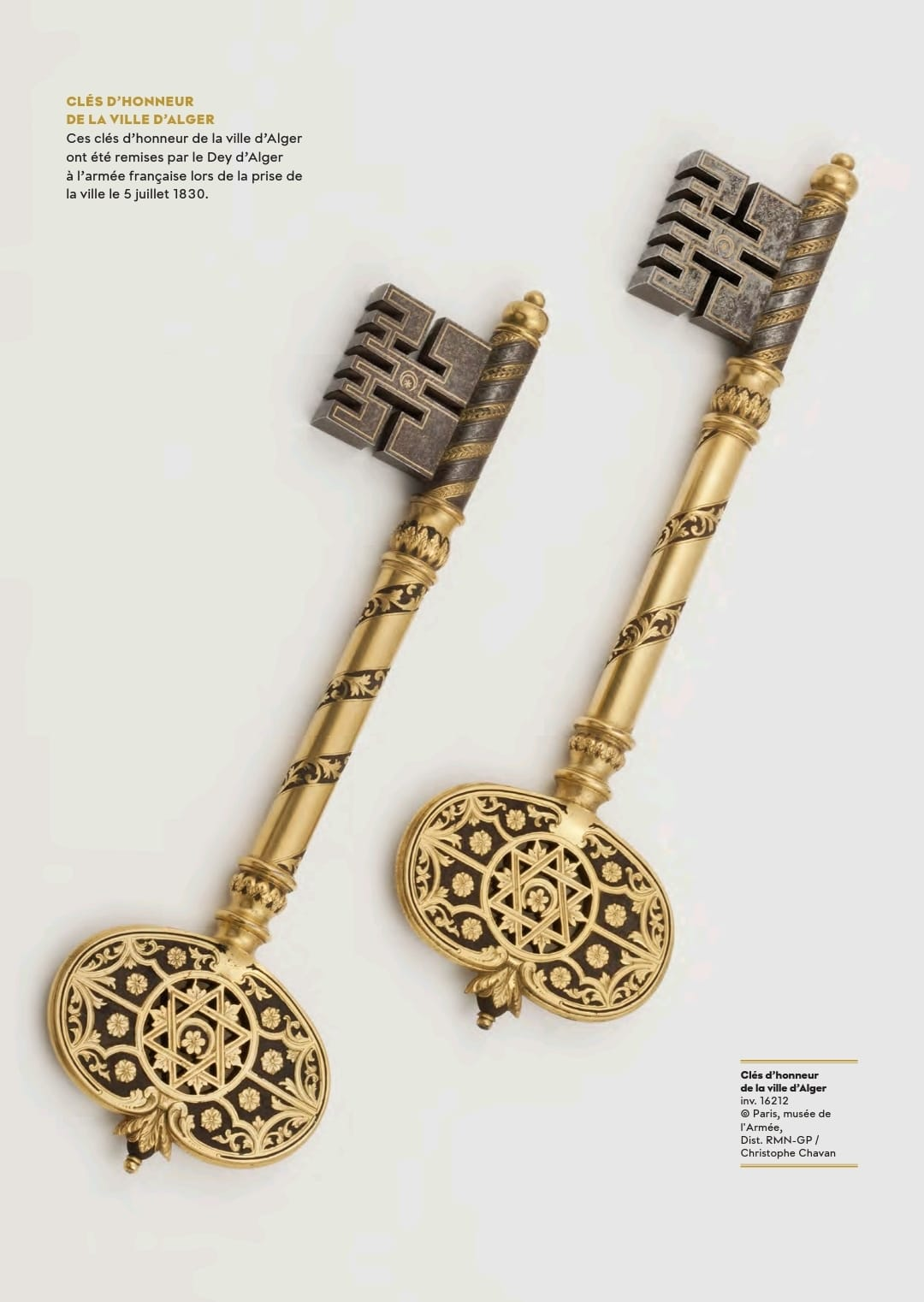
The keys of the city of Algiers, which were handed to the French Army on 5 July 1830.

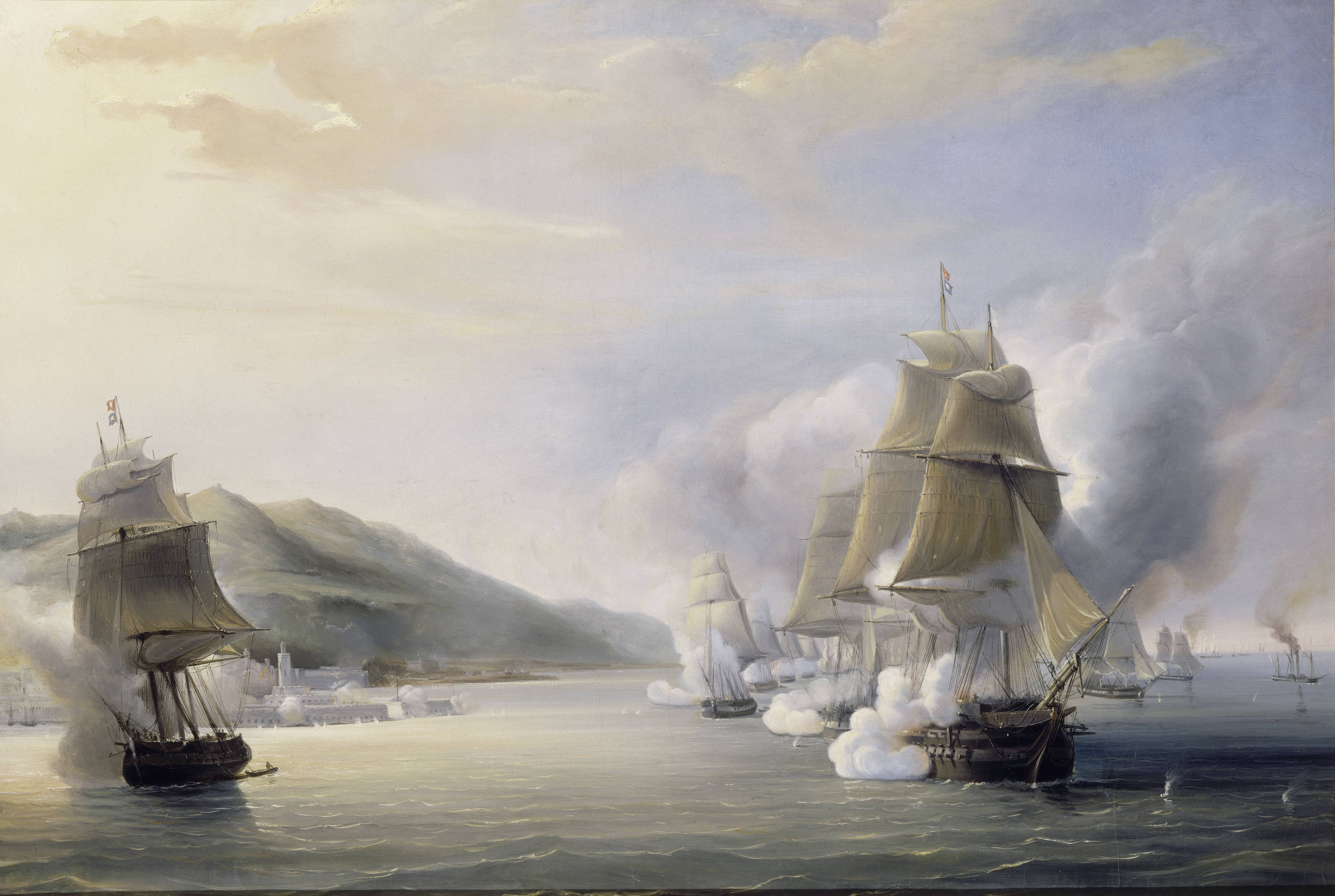
Bombardment of Algiers by sea on 3 July 1830

On 29 April 1827, foreign consuls and diplomatic agents gathered in the Palace of the Dey for a conference with the Regency of Algiers ruler Hussein Dey. Tensions were high because of France's failure to pay outstanding debts. In a heated moment later referred to as "fly-whisk incident", Dey struck the French consul in the face with the handle of a fly-whisk.

In an attempt by Charles X of France to increase his popularity amongst the French, he sought to bolster patriotic sentiment, and turn eyes away from his domestic policies, by treating the incident as a public insult and demanded an apology. Failure to respond was met by operations against Dey. A naval siege on the port of Algiers by the French Navy began the following days which lasted 3 years and impacted the French and Algerian economies due to their former extensive trade treaties.

Tensions only continued rising while the French Armed Forces were preparing for the 1830 invasion of Algiers. The naval fleet departed from Toulon on 25 May 1830, and successfully reached the western coast of the Regency near what is today Sidi Fredj on 14 June 1830. The Algerian forces met their French opponents in the Battle of Staouéli on 19 June 1830, to which the Dey's forces were defeated, this enabled the colonial army to advance into the city and made Hussein Dey surrender to French General de Bourmont on 5 July 1830.

=== French rule ===
Under French rule, Algiers became the capital of French Algeria, "an integral part of the French Republic" according to a formal annexation declared on 22 June 1834. Following this, interest turned into the completion of the French conquest of Algeria that shared goals with its pacification efforts; Establishing a European cultural, economic and political presence in Africa. Plans to transform the face of the city to match French standards and architectural trends began shortly after obtaining the city. Originally, the Casbah extended to the sea, but it was pushed back to the hills above after demolishing the walls and lower half of the old city and erecting the current "Place des Martyrs", constructing promenades and boulevards that circle the city or face the Mediterranean, tracing new streets and building apartments that are characterized by their "Haussmanian" Style.

Settlers of European descent marked a majority of the city's population, some constituted a minority of "Pieds-noirs" who were granted French citizenship and rights under the Crémieux Decree. On the other hand, Code de l'indigénat enforced inferiority of the "Arabs" and "Muslims" which were getting forcibly removed from their homes and were banned from entering various parts of "Alger" to segregate by race, religion and language. Added to that, mosques were repurposed to churches, stables, or demolished/closed permanently, examples of this are Ketchoua Mosque and Ali Bitchin Mosque.

French casualties in Algeria (1830–1851)
| Year | Active | Died in hospital | Killed in battle |
|---|---|---|---|
| 1831 | 71,190 | 1,005 | 55 |
| 1832 | 21,511 | 1,998 | 48 |
| 1833 | 26,681 | 2,512 | |
| 1834 | 29,858 | 1,991 | 24 |
| 1835 | 29,485 | 2,335 | 310 |
| 1836 | 29,897 | 2,139 | 606 |
| 1837 | 40,147 | 4,502 | 121 |
| 1838 | 48,167 | 2,413 | 150 |
| 1839 | 50,367 | 3,600 | 163 |
| 1840 | 61,204 | 9,567 | 227 |
| 1841 | 72,000 | 7,802 | 349 |
| 1842 | 70,853 | 5,588 | 225 |
| 1843 | 75,034 | 4,809 | 84 |
| 1844 | 82,037 | 4,664 | 167 |
| 1845 | 95,000 | 4,664 | 601 |
| 1846 | 99,700 | 6,862 | 116 |
| 1847 | 87,704 | 4,437 | 77 |
| 1848 | 75,017 | 4,406 | 13 |
| 1849 | 70,774 | 9,744 | |
| 1850 | 71,496 | 4,098 | |
| 1851 | 65,598 | 3,193 | |

During the 1930s, the architect Le Corbusier drew up plans for a complete redesign of the colonial city. Le Corbusier was highly critical of the urban style of Algiers, describing the European district as "nothing but crumbling walls and devastated nature, the whole a sullied blot". He also criticised the difference in living standards he perceived between the European and African residents of the city, describing a situation in which "the 'civilised' live like rats in holes" whereas "the 'barbarians' live in solitude, in well-being". However, these plans were ultimately ignored by the French administration.

During World War II, Algiers was the first city to be seized from the Axis by the Allies in Operation Terminal, a part of Operation Torch.

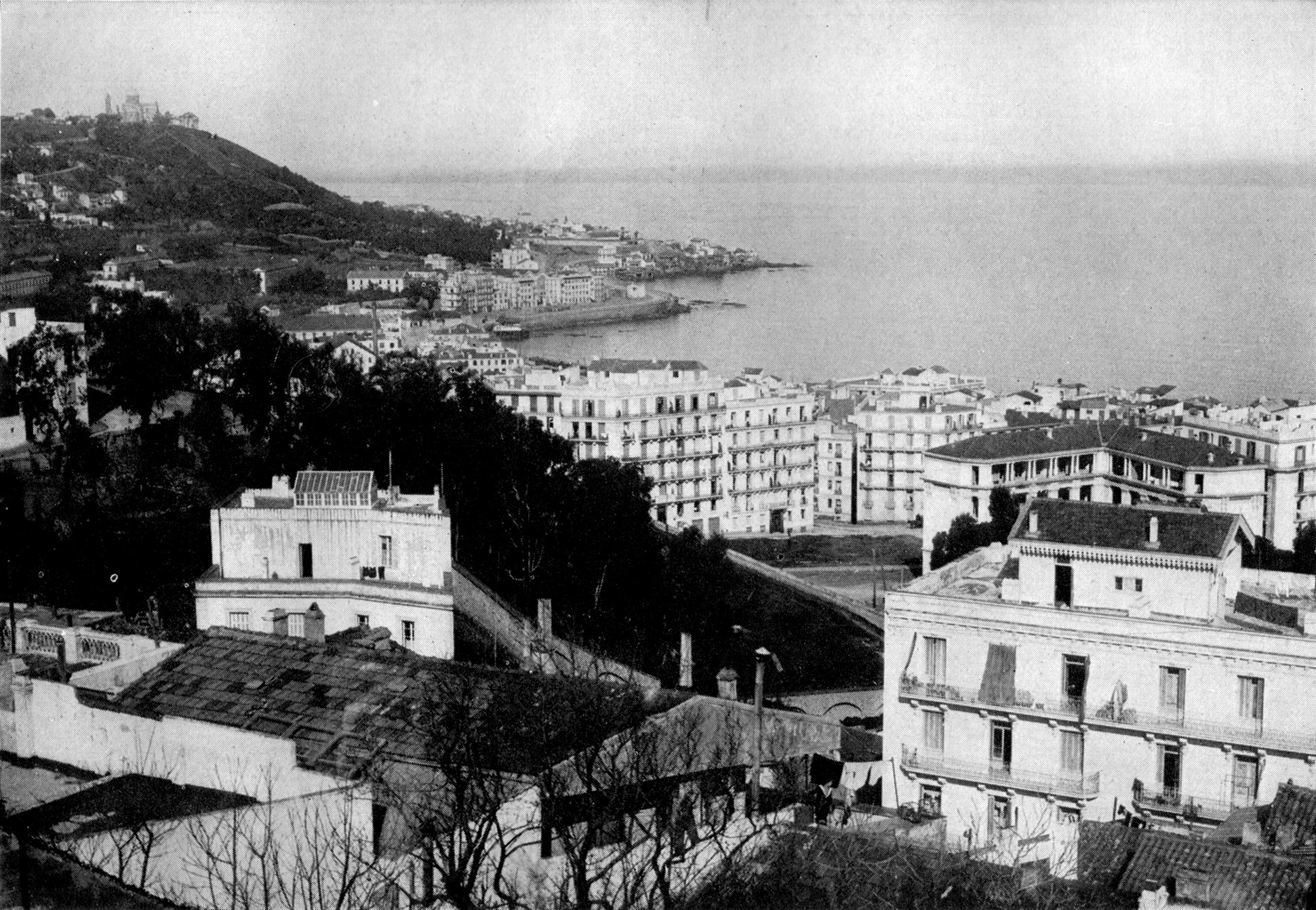
City and harbour of Algiers, c. 1921

=== Algerian War ===
The "tense truce" between Algerian rebels, French army and the OAS in 1962

Algiers also played a pivotal role in the Algerian War (1954–1962), a bloody independence struggle in which hundreds of thousands (estimates range between 350,000 and 1,500,000) died (mostly Algerians but also French and pieds-noirs). In particular, it saw the Battle of Algiers when the 10th Parachute Division of the French Army, starting on 7 January 1957, and on the orders of the French Minister of Justice François Mitterrand (who authorized any means "to eliminate the insurrectionists"), led attacks against the Algerian fighters for independence. Algiers remains marked by this battle, which was characterized by merciless fighting between FLN forces which carried out a guerrilla campaign against the French military and police and pro-French Algerian soldiers, and the French Army which responded with a bloody repression, torture and blanket terrorism against the native population. The demonstrations of 13 May during the crisis of 1958 provoked the fall of the Fourth Republic in France, as well as the return of General de Gaulle to power.

=== Independence ===
Algeria achieved independence on 5 July 1962, with Algiers as its capital. Since then, despite losing its entire pied-noir population, the city has expanded massively. It now has about five million inhabitants, or 10 percent of Algeria's population—and its suburbs now cover most of the surrounding Mitidja plain. Run by the FLN that had secured independence, Algiers became a member of Non-Aligned Movement during the Cold War. In October 1988, one year before the fall of the Berlin Wall, Algiers was the site of demonstrations demanding the end of the single-party system and the creation of a real democracy baptized the "Spring of Algiers". The demonstrators were repressed by the authorities (more than 300 dead), but the movement constituted a turning point in the political history of modern Algeria. The 1989 Algerian constitutional referendum took place and a new constitution was adopted that put an end to the one-party rule and saw the creation of more than fifty political parties, as well as official freedom of the press. The Kasbah of Algiers was enlisted as a cultural world heritage site by UNESCO in December 1992.

=== Crisis of the 1990s ===
The city became the theatre of many political demonstrations of all descriptions until 1993. In 1991, a political entity dominated by religious conservatives called the Islamic Salvation Front engaged in a political test of wills with the authorities. In the 1992 elections for the Algerian National Assembly, the Islamists garnered a large amount of support in the first round. Fearing an eventual win by the Islamists, the army canceled the election process, setting off the civil war between the State and armed religious conservatives which would last for a decade.

On 11 December 2007, two car bombs exploded in Algiers. One bomb targeted two United Nations office buildings and the other targeted a government building housing the Supreme Court of Algeria. The death toll was at least 62, with over two hundred injured in the attacks. However, only 26 remained hospitalized the following day. As of 2008, it is speculated that the attack was carried out by the Al Qaeda cell within the city.

Indigenous terrorist groups have been actively operating in Algeria since around 2002.

== Geography ==
=== Location ===
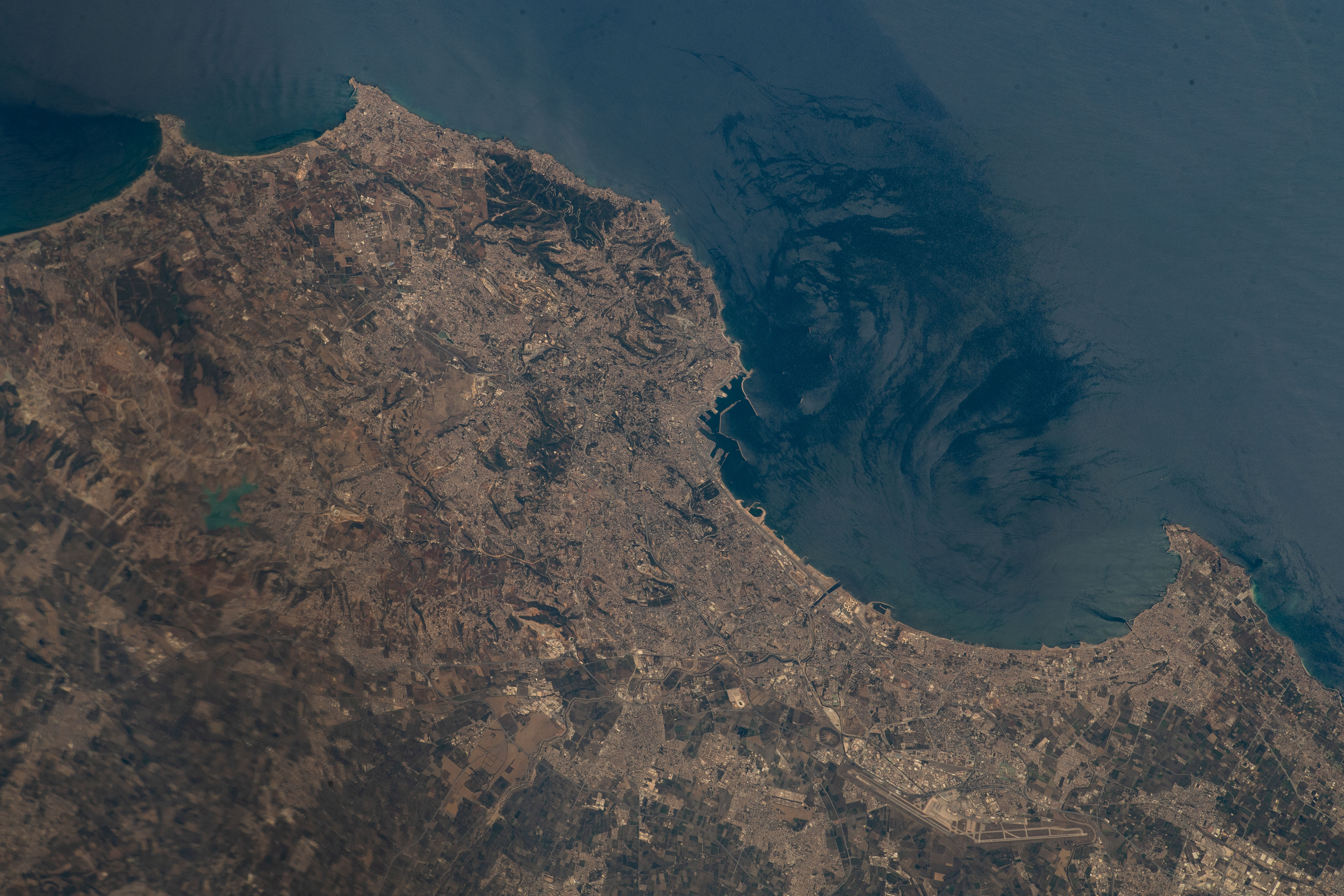
Satellite image of Algiers

Algiers is located in the north-central part of Algeria. Relative to the Bay of Algiers, the historical center was founded and extended on the "Algiers Sahel", coastal hills of the east, though the city grew exponentially on top of the hills eventually extending as far as towns such as Aïn Bénian in the east, and Bordj El Bahri in the west, and towards the Mitidja Plain in its northern, central, and western parts.

Algiers is crossed by several rivers and waterways that are indifferently called Oued. All the rivers that cross it flow into the Mediterranean making it specific to its environment. The Bouzaréah massif, known for its rugged relief, has a very dense hydrographic network, drained by eight main waterways (Baranès, Sidi Medjber, Frais vallon, jaubert, Scotto Nadal, Chemin du Fort, Birtraria and Oued Koriche or Oued Atoun). Half of its waterways have been artificialized and channeled by buried collectors. To the west, one finds the Mazafran and Beni Messous Wadis. To the east, the El Harrach (the main Oued dividing the city into an eastern urban and historical side, and a western suburban side), El Hamiz and Réghaïa Wadis.

Considerable land reclamation along the waterfront allowed for developments such as "Marina Mall" in 2012, "Sablettes Promenade" in 2016, El kettani waterfront in 2025 and ongoing projects like the Algiers Medina, New bay of Algiers, Wadis new arrangements.

The city's downtown sits at an elevation of 2 m (at the Algiers Central Post Office), while it averages 45 m across the city's metropolitan area, and tops at 407 m on the Bouzaréah peak. Algiers Province, the administrative area that includes the city's urban and suburban centers covers 1,190 km2 (460 sq mi).

=== Climate ===
Algiers has a Mediterranean climate (Köppen climate classification Csa). Its proximity to the Mediterranean aids in moderating the city's temperatures. As a result, Algiers usually does not see the extreme temperatures that are experienced in the adjacent interior. Algiers on average receives roughly 685.6 millimetres (27 in) of rain per year, the bulk of which is seen between October and April. The precipitation is higher than in most of coastal Mediterranean Spain, and similar to most of coastal Mediterranean France, as opposed to the interior North African semi-arid or arid climate.

The rainiest months are November and December, in a single month (November) it can rain more than Riyadh annually. On average, the city sees 2.4 freezing nights a year.

Snow is very rare; the last snowfall was in 2012, when the city received 100 millimetres (4 in) of snowfall, its first snowfall in eight years. The hottest temperature ever recorded in Algiers was 48.7 °C (119.7 °F) on 21 July 2023, and the coldest temperature ever recorded in Algiers was −3.3 °C (26.1 °F).

Climate data for Algiers (Houari Boumediene Airport), 1991–2020, extremes 1838–present
| Month | Jan | Feb | Mar | Apr | May | Jun | Jul | Aug | Sep | Oct | Nov | Dec | Year |
|---|---|---|---|---|---|---|---|---|---|---|---|---|---|
| Record high °C (°F) | 27.6 (81.7) | 31.4 (88.5) | 36.3 (97.3) | 36.5 (97.7) | 41.1 (106.0) | 44.6 (112.3) | 48.7 (119.7) | 47.5 (117.5) | 44.4 (111.9) | 39.5 (103.1) | 34.4 (93.9) | 30.4 (86.7) | 48.7 (119.7) |
| Mean daily maximum °C (°F) | 17.1 (62.8) | 17.5 (63.5) | 19.7 (67.5) | 21.8 (71.2) | 25.0 (77.0) | 29.0 (84.2) | 32.1 (89.8) | 32.9 (91.2) | 29.8 (85.6) | 26.5 (79.7) | 21.2 (70.2) | 18.2 (64.8) | 24.2 (75.6) |
| Daily mean °C (°F) | 11.3 (52.3) | 11.5 (52.7) | 13.6 (56.5) | 15.6 (60.1) | 18.8 (65.8) | 22.6 (72.7) | 25.7 (78.3) | 26.6 (79.9) | 23.9 (75.0) | 20.4 (68.7) | 15.7 (60.3) | 12.6 (54.7) | 18.2 (64.8) |
| Mean daily minimum °C (°F) | 5.5 (41.9) | 5.6 (42.1) | 7.5 (45.5) | 9.4 (48.9) | 12.6 (54.7) | 16.2 (61.2) | 19.4 (66.9) | 20.4 (68.7) | 17.9 (64.2) | 14.3 (57.7) | 10.1 (50.2) | 7.0 (44.6) | 9.2 (48.6) |
| Record low °C (°F) | −3.3 (26.1) | −1.9 (28.6) | −1.0 (30.2) | −0.8 (30.6) | 2.6 (36.7) | 5.5 (41.9) | 9.0 (48.2) | 9.5 (49.1) | 8.2 (46.8) | 4.1 (39.4) | −0.1 (31.8) | −2.3 (27.9) | −3.3 (26.1) |
| Average precipitation mm (inches) | 84.2 (3.31) | 72.1 (2.84) | 58.9 (2.32) | 58.0 (2.28) | 39.0 (1.54) | 8.6 (0.34) | 1.5 (0.06) | 10.6 (0.42) | 27.5 (1.08) | 51.5 (2.03) | 102.7 (4.04) | 86.4 (3.40) | 685.2 (26.98) |
| Average precipitation days (≥ 1 mm) | 8.4 | 8.7 | 7.0 | 6.1 | 4.3 | 1.4 | 0.4 | 1.4 | 4.0 | 5.4 | 9.2 | 8.2 | 64.5 |
| Average relative humidity (%) | 71 | 66 | 65 | 62 | 66 | 66 | 67 | 65 | 68 | 66 | 68 | 68 | 67 |
| Mean monthly sunshine hours | 139.5 | 158.2 | 207.7 | 228.0 | 300.7 | 300.0 | 353.4 | 325.5 | 267.0 | 198.4 | 153.0 | 145.7 | 2,777.1 |
| Mean daily sunshine hours | 4.5 | 5.6 | 6.7 | 7.6 | 9.7 | 10.0 | 11.4 | 10.5 | 8.9 | 6.4 | 5.1 | 4.7 | 7.6 |
| Average ultraviolet index | 2 | 3 | 5 | 7 | 8 | 10 | 10 | 9 | 7 | 5 | 3 | 2 | 6 |
Source 1: NOAA
Source 2: Arab Meteorology Book (humidity and sun) and Weather Atlas (UV index), Meteo Climat (record highs and lows)

==== Climate change ====
A 2019 paper published in PLOS One estimated that under Representative Concentration Pathway 4.5, a "moderate" scenario of climate change where global warming reaches ~2.5–3 °C (4.5–5.4 °F) by 2100, the climate of Algiers in the year 2050 would most closely resemble the current climate of Perth in Australia. The annual temperature would increase by 2.6 °C (4.7 °F), and the temperature of the warmest month by 1.9 °C (3.4 °F), while the temperature of the coldest month would be 3.8 °C (6.8 °F) higher. According to Climate Action Tracker, the current warming trajectory appears consistent with 2.7 °C (4.9 °F), which closely matches Representative Concentration Pathway (RCP) 4.5.

Moreover, according to the 2022 IPCC Sixth Assessment Report, Algiers is one of 12 major African cities (Abidjan, Alexandria, Algiers, Cape Town, Casablanca, Dakar, Dar es Salaam, Durban, Lagos, Lomé, Luanda and Maputo) which would be the most severely affected by the future sea level rise. It estimates that they would collectively sustain cumulative damages of U$65 billion under RCP 4.5 and US$86.5 billion for the high-emission scenario RCP 8.5 by the year 2050. Additionally, RCP 8.5 combined with the hypothetical impact from marine ice sheet instability at high levels of warming would involve up to US$137.5 billion in damages, while the additional accounting for the "low-probability, high-damage events" may increase aggregate risks to $187 billion for the "moderate" RCP 4.5, $206 billion for RCP 8.5 and $397 billion under the high-end ice sheet instability scenario. Since sea level rise would continue for about 10,000 years under every scenario of climate change, future costs of sea level rise would only increase, especially without adaptation measures. The Casbah is on a list of 10 African World Heritage Site most threatened by sea level rise.

== Administration ==
=== Administrative changes over time ===
==== During French rule ====
In 1830, the city of Algiers was a Casbah, a fortified city built on the ruins of traders and old civilisations that inhabited the area, but after the French conquest its walls were demolished and the city was expanded into a european side which eventually unified both in 1832 into a municipality.

Following this in 1835 was the creation of 14 additional communes around Algiers, the communes of El Biar and Mustapha (currently Sidi M'Hamed) were attached to it before being detached in 1870. In 1904, the commune of Mustapha was definitively integrated into the city of Algiers which was divided into 12 districts for a total area of 15.64 km².

In 1959, Greater Algiers was created with the grouping of 9 municipalities (Algiers, Saint-Eugène, Bouzareah, El Biar, Dely Brahim, Birmendreis, Kouba, Hussein-Dey and Maison-Carrée). This area was divided into 10 districts and a territory of 186 km², it was governed by a general administrator appointed by decree and a municipal council of 75 members, each district being governed by a deputy mayor.

==== After Independence ====
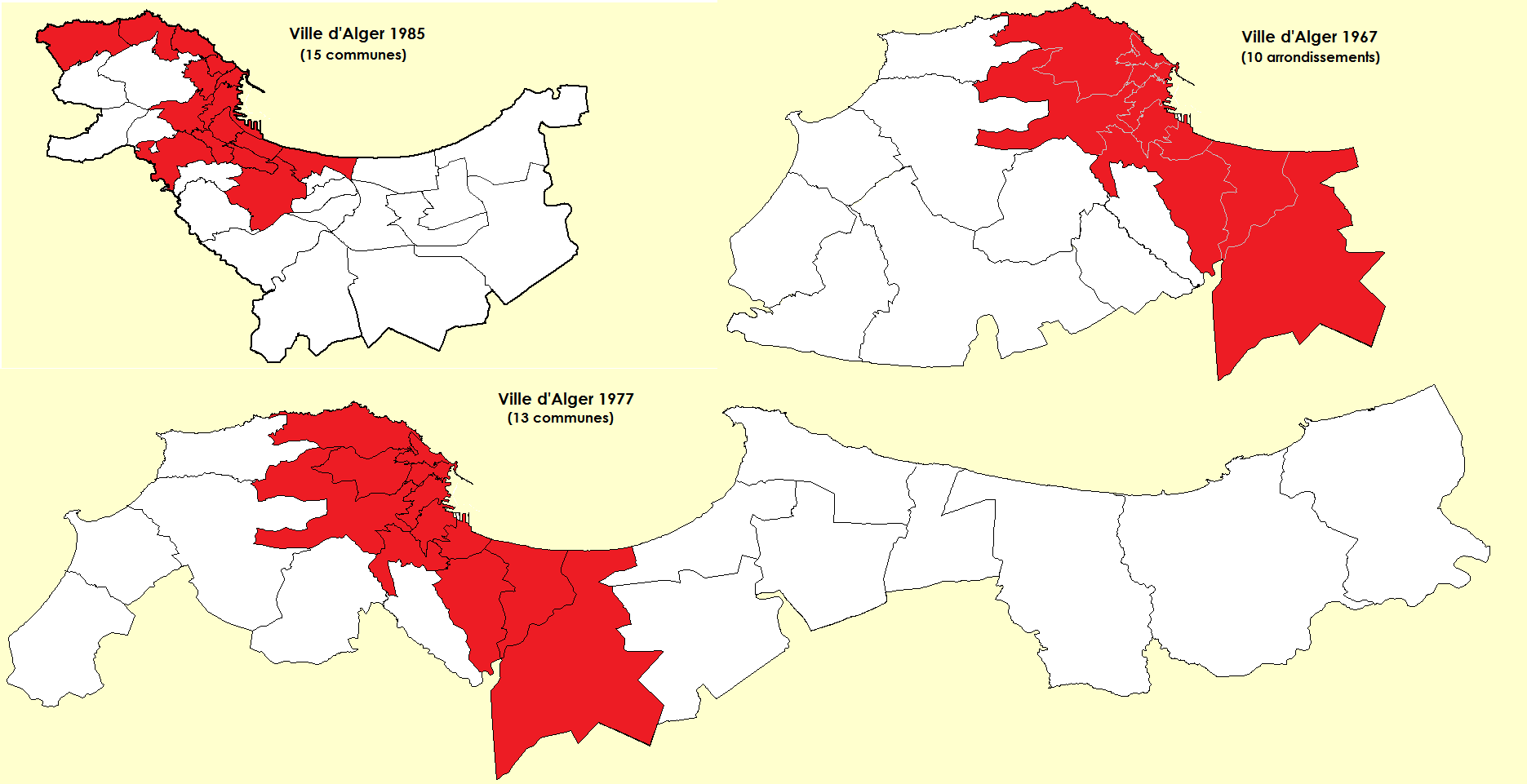
Divisions of the city of Algiers (in red) over time (1959/1967-1977-1985) within the Wilaya of Algiers (in white).

The city was maintained until 1967 when the role of a general administrator was removed. In 1974, two districts were added (Bouzareah and Bir Mourad Raïs). In 1977, the districts became fully-fledged municipalities, but the People's Council of the City of Algiers (CPVA) was created, bringing together the former districts to continue the prerogatives of the former municipality of Algiers. A new entity was added to the CPVA, namely Baraki, bringing the total to 13 municipalities.

Following the administrative division of 1984, the city was once again reorganized in 1985, increasing to 15 communes, but the area was divided by three, increasing to 58.5 km², by shedding the peripheral territories, to the east around El Harrach, to the west (Bouzareah) and to the south (Bir Mourad Raïs). It continued to be managed jointly by the communes and the CPVA, but the latter is placed under the supervision of the wilaya.

Since the postponement of the municipal elections of 1989, the CPVA ceased to exist. It was first replaced by a Provisional Municipal Council of the Urban Agglomeration of Algiers (CCPAUA), but a few a months later, in April 1990, two new laws relating to the commune and the wilaya were adopted, and the Urban Coordination Councils of the Wilaya of Algiers (CUC) was created, the former municipalities forming the city of Algiers having been grouped under the name "Intercommunal Council of Algiers". From that moment on, the administration of the wilaya definitively replaced that of the city. Thus, the technical departments and services linked to the CPVA were placed under the supervision of the Wilaya before becoming Public Industrial and Commercial Establishment in Algeria (EPIC).

In 1997, after expanding to include 24 new municipalities, the Wilaya of Algiers was granted a special status and became the "Governorate of Greater Algiers" (GGA), headed by a minister-governor, in this case Cherif Rahmani. It would be organized into 28 urban communes, called urban districts, and into 29 simple communes. This new status did not last long, since in 2000, the GGA was dissolved, having been deemed unconstitutional.

=== Districts of Algiers ===
1. Sidi M'Hamed District; 2. Bab El Oued District; 3. Hussein Dey District; 4. El Harrach District; 5. Bir Mourad Raïs District; 6. Bouzaréah District; 7. Dar El Beïda District; 8. Draria District; 9. Chéraga District; 10. Baraki District

The city of Algiers spans 10 of the 13 districts of the province, which are:

==== Immediate urban districts ====
Sidi M'Hamed, located on the eastern shores of the bay, it is the geographically smallest and most densely populated district. The district is known for its numerous architectural styles ranging from moorish and Baroque, to modern and moderne styles, emphasising the city's stance as a melting-pot for architectural experimentation. It contains the most well-known landmarks such as Maqam Echahid, Central Postal Office, Sacred Heart Cathedral, the Government Palace, El Aurassi Hotel, Aérohabitat residency, the Cultural Palace, Bardo Museum and University of Algiers 1. Sidi M'Hamed has always been the hub for expression, and chants for change; after all it has witnessed the Battle of Algiers, the mass riots of 1988, mass protests from 1990/1991 leading up into the Algerian Civil War, a result of a political and societal crisis, Hirak Echaabi in 2019.

The district is serviced by various modes of transport, 3 commuter rail stations, the Algiers Central Train Station "Algiers Station" in the "Alger-Centre" municipality as well as the "Agha Station" in the "Sidi M'Hamed" (Previously "Mustapha") municipality and the "Ateliers Station" in the "Belouizdad" (Previously "Belcourt") municipality, 5 Metro stations, 2 Gondola lift lines are planned, Algiers' Maritime Terminal, and the Port of Algiers (among the biggest ports of the country). Algerian Television (EPTV), The Algerian Radio, the Bank of Algeria, Algiers Financial City (AFC) (construction halted) are based in Sidi M'Hamed.

The district houses both chambers of the Algerian parliament, the Headquarters of the Presidency of the Republic, the Headquarters of the Republican Guard, and ministries of Foreign Affairs, Culture, Environment and Quality of Life, Youth and Sports, "Knowledge Economy, Startups And Micro Entreprises", "Interior, Local Authorities and Regional Planning"; As well as the Atomic Energy Commission. As well as housing the Province's House.

Bab El Oued, located on the northern part of downtown facing the Mediterranean, it is a district associated with modest living and lively streets, and is widely seen as lower to middle-class. The historic center of the city, Casbah is a primary representation of its vibes, from Square Port-Saïd and Martyrs' Square that lead to Algiers' biggest markets and museums, which reflect the region's rich history and culture, as well as old religious diversity of Judaism, Islam and Catholic Christianity, to Landmarks that include the Roman ruins near the Metro Station and Rais' Palace, Dar Hassan Pacha, Palace of the Dey, and "Climat de France", a housing project developed by the French; the Great Synagogue of Algiers, Basilica of Our Lady of Africa, and Ketchaoua Mosque; which affirms the architectural diversity of Algiers. The district finds Chaabi and Algerian pop culture to be an integrated part of its identity and culture; Added to that are its immense contributions to the war for independence and resistance against the colonial regime that included the events of the Battle of Algiers.

This district is serviced by 2 Metro stations with 3 additional ones under construction, it also has 3 Gondola lift lines (The "Our Lady Africa" line is out of service) with an additional one planned, and access to the Port of Algiers in its historic side.

The district is also home to the MND, "DGSN", and the Public Treasury.

Hussein Dey is located east of Oued El Harrach, it administers 5 major neighbourhoods from Belouizdad to Kouba, it is the hub of the MCA and CRB football clubs, the most popular ones in the country. Belouizdad, Tripoli, and El Magharia are regarded as lower to middle-class neighbourhoods and have largely contributed to Algerian pop culture and Chaabi while Kouba, Jolie Vue, and Garidi 1/2 are more middle to upper-middle class neighbourhoods.

The district is home to the Botanical Garden Hamma, the Sablettes Promenade, National Library, Abdul Latif House, a section of El Harrach Urban Park (under construction), The Great African Museum of Algiers (Planned), the Liberty Trail (under construction), Urban Skate Park Hamma (under construction).

Hussein Dey has the main Inter-wilaya/Inter-city bus and Inter-wilaya/Inter-city taxi terminals of Algier (Kherrouba), and is serviced by 4 commuter rail stations, 6 Metro stations (1 transfer station, 8 Tramway stations (Additional station is planned according to the extension plans for Line 1), 3 Gondola lift lines (One in service, a new line is planned, modifications are planned for the out-of service line), and Sablettes' Marina and Tourism Port.

The district houses the Algiers Provincial Court, ANAAT, SONELGAZ, SEAAL, Algiers Matro Expoitation Society (SEMA), and International Press Center headquarters, the Faculty of Islamic Sciences - Algiers 1, Ministries of "Religious Affairs and Endowments", "Water Resources and Water Security (Hydraulics)". The new Algerian Parliament buildings will be based here according to plans.

- El Harrach, a suburb of Algiers, is located about 10 kilometres (6 miles) to the east of the city.
- The communes of Hydra, Ben Aknoun, El-Biar and Bouzaréah form what the inhabitants of Algiers call the "Heights of Algiers". These communes shelter the majority of the foreign embassies of Algiers, of many ministries and university centres, which makes it one of the administrative and policy centres of the country.

== Local architecture ==
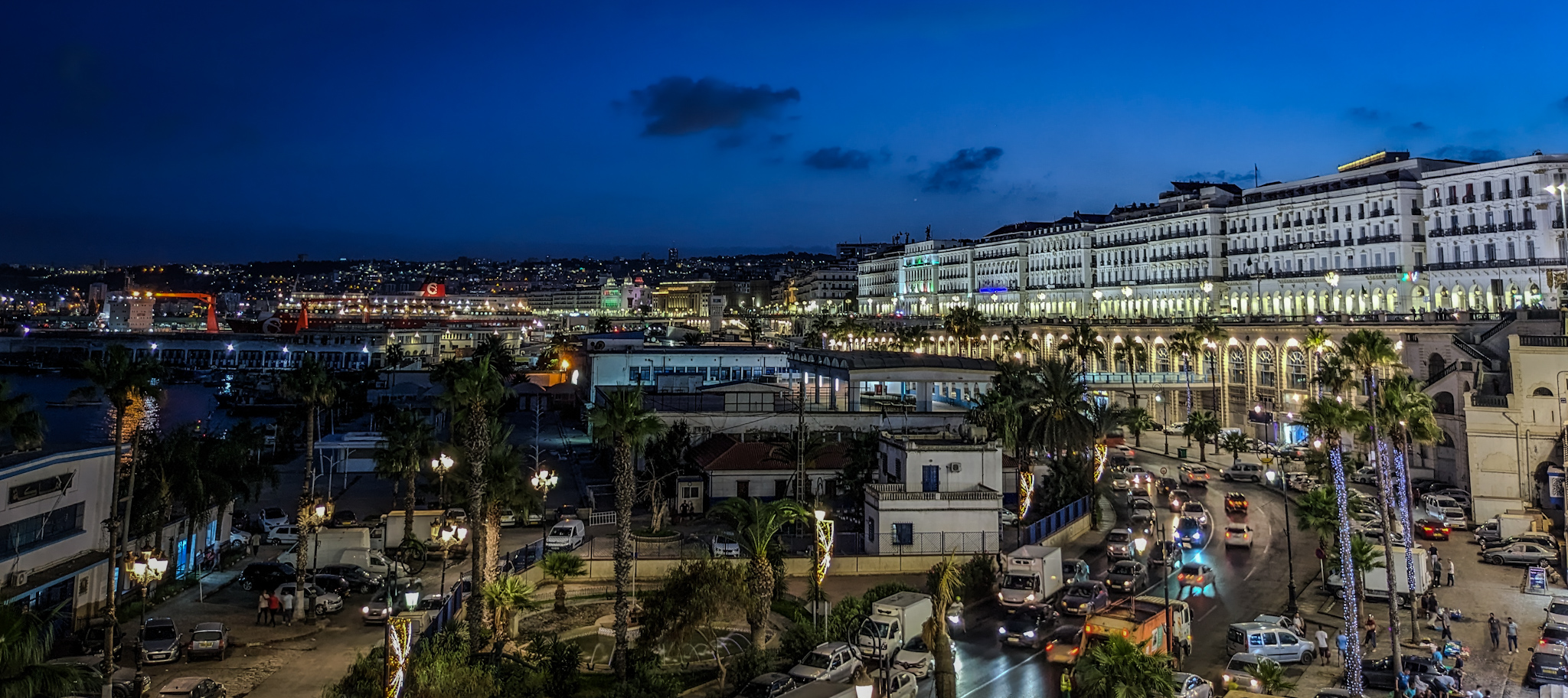
Algiers at night

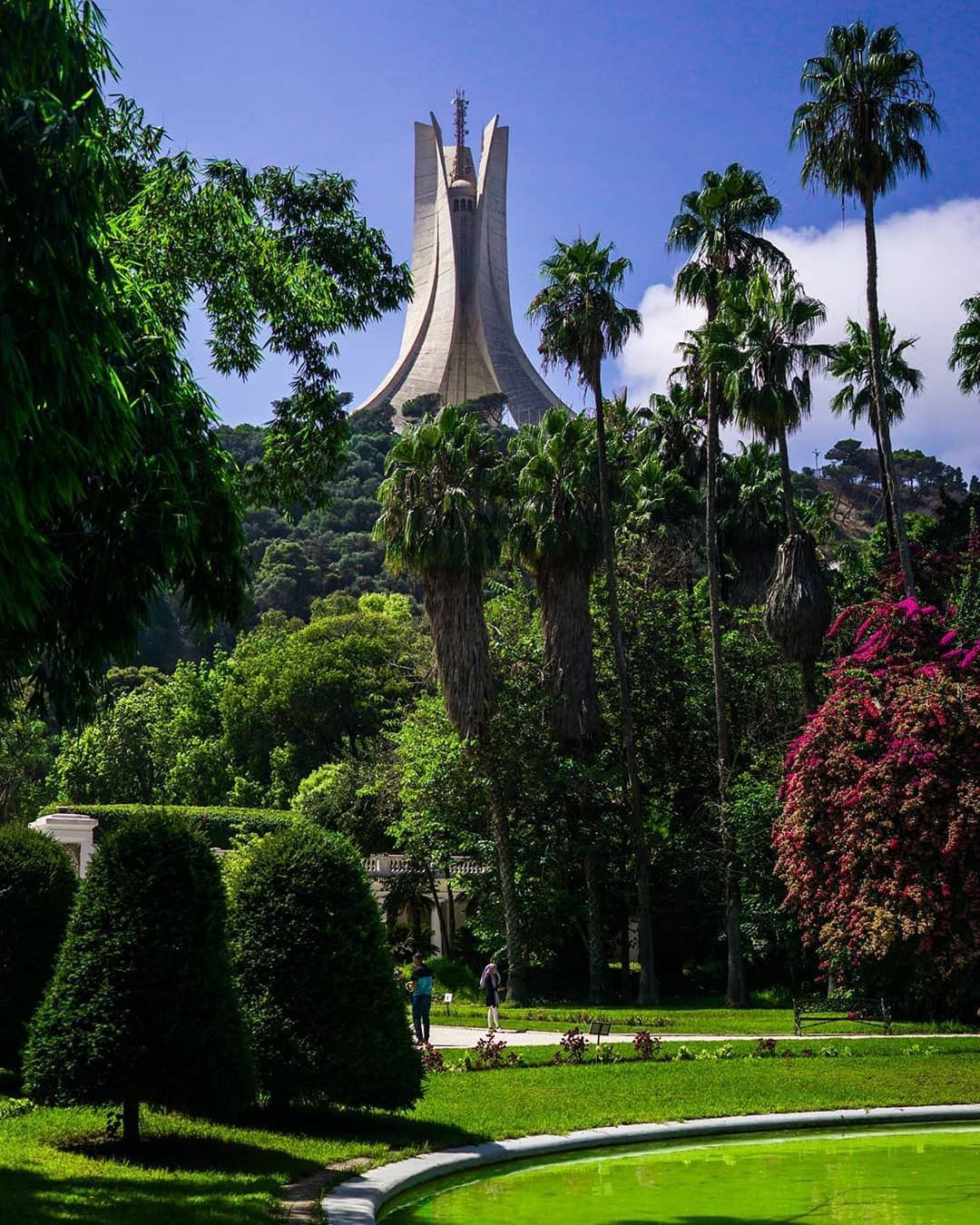
Botanical Garden Hamma

There are many public buildings of interest, including the whole Kasbah quarter, Martyrs Square (Sahat ech-Chouhada ساحة الشهداء), the government offices (formerly the British consulate), the "Grand", "New", and Ketchaoua Mosques, the Roman Catholic cathedral of Notre Dame d'Afrique, the Bardo Museum, the old Bibliothèque Nationale d'Alger—a Moorish palace built in 1799–1800 and the new National Library, built in a style reminiscent of the British Library.

The main building in the Kasbah was begun in 1516 on the site of an older building, and served as the palace of the deys until the French conquest. A road has been cut through the centre of the building, the mosque turned into barracks, and the hall of audience allowed to fall into ruin. There still remains a minaret and some marble arches and columns. Traces exist of the vaults in which were stored the treasures of the dey.

Djamaa el Kebir (Jamaa-el-Kebir الجامع الكبير) is the oldest mosque in Algiers. It was first built by Yusuf ibn Tashfin, but reconstructed many times. The pulpit (minbar منبر) bears an inscription showing that the building existed in 1097. The minaret was built by the sultan of Tlemcen, in 1324. The interior of the mosque is square and is divided into aisles by columns joined by Moorish arches.

The New Mosque (Jamaa-el-Jedid الجامع الجديد), dating from the 17th century, is in the form of a Greek cross, surmounted by a large white cupola, with four small cupolas at the corners. The minaret is 27 metres (89 ft) high. The interior resembles that of the Grand Mosque.

The church of the Holy Trinity (built in 1870) stands at the southern end of the rue d'Isly near the site of the demolished Fort Bab Azoun باب عزون. The interior is richly decorated with various coloured marbles. Many of these marbles contain memorial inscriptions relating to the British residents (voluntary and involuntary) of Algiers from the time of John Tipton, the first English consul, in 1580 (NB Some sources give 1585). One tablet records that in 1631 two Algerine pirate crews landed in Ireland, sacked Baltimore, and enslaved its inhabitants.

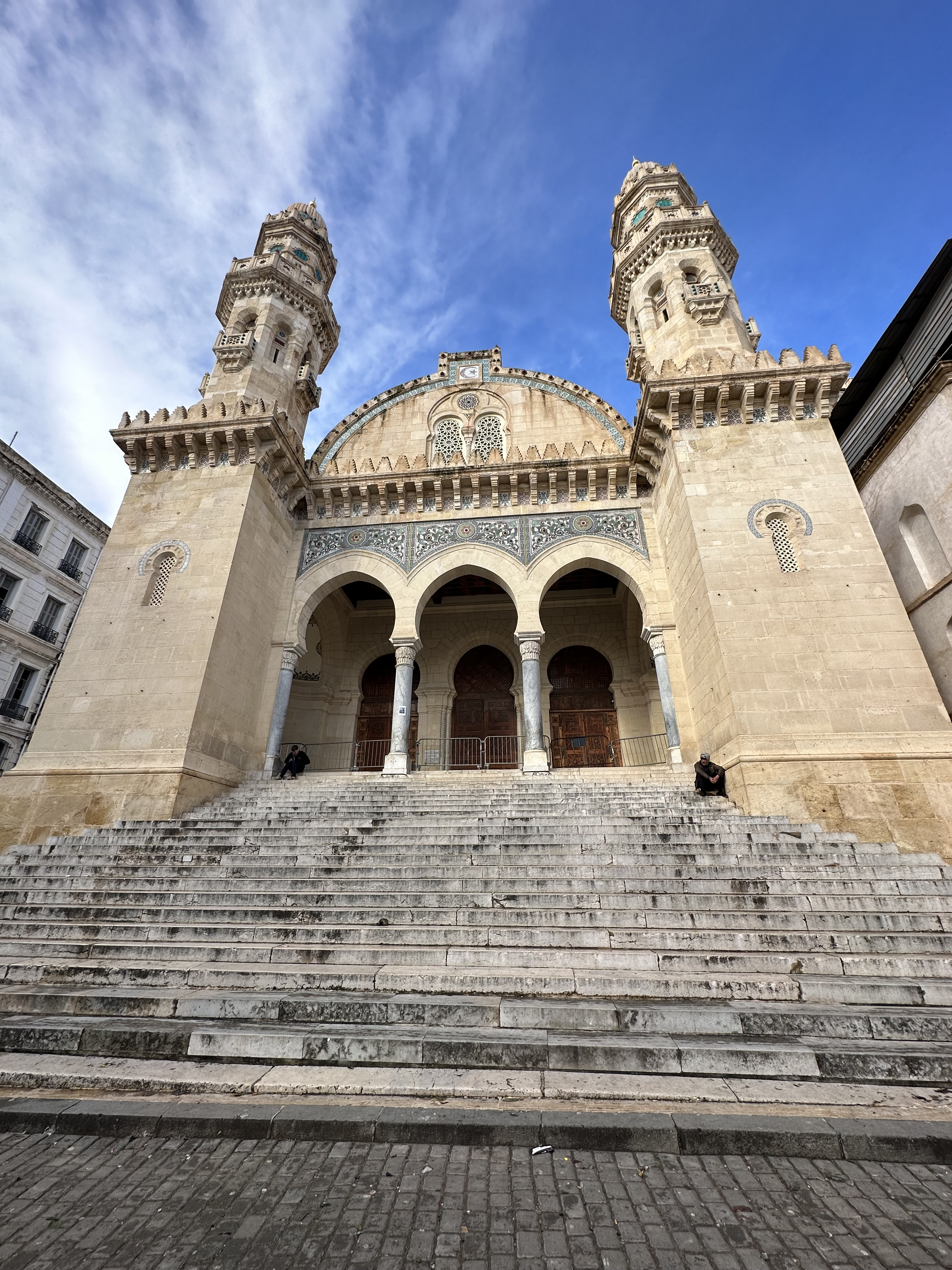
The Ketchaoua Mosque

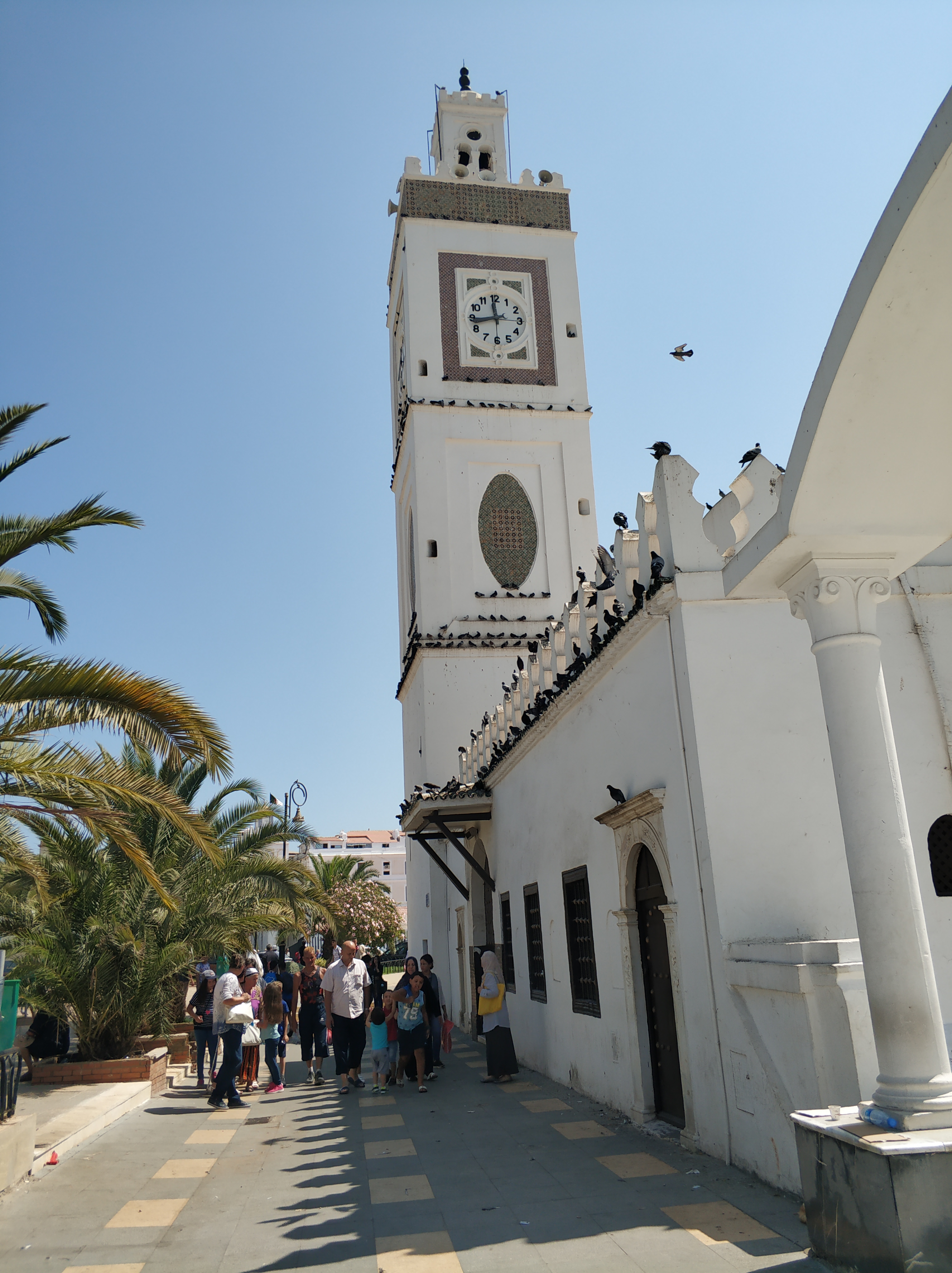
Mosque in the City of Algiers.

The Ketchaoua Mosque (Djamaa Ketchaoua جامع كتشاوة), at the foot of the Casbah, was before independence in 1962 the cathedral of St Philippe, itself made in 1845 from a mosque dating from 1612. The principal entrance, reached by a flight of 23 steps, is ornamented with a portico supported by four black-veined marble columns. The roof of the nave is of Moorish plaster work. It rests on a series of arcades supported by white marble columns. Several of these columns belonged to the original mosque. In one of the chapels was a tomb containing the bones of Geronimo. The building seems a curious blend of Moorish and Byzantine styles.

Algiers possesses a college with schools of law, medicine, science and letters. The college buildings are large and handsome. The Bardo Museum holds some of the ancient sculptures and mosaics discovered in Algeria, together with medals and Algerian money.

The port of Algiers is sheltered from all winds. There are two harbours, both artificial—the old or northern harbour and the southern or Agha harbour. The northern harbour covers an area of 95 hectares (235 acres). An opening in the south jetty affords an entrance into Agha harbour, constructed in Agha Bay. Agha harbour has also an independent entrance on its southern side. The inner harbour was begun in 1518 by Khair-ad-Din Barbarossa (see History, below), who, to accommodate his pirate vessels, caused the island on which was Fort Penon to be connected with the mainland by a mole. The lighthouse which occupies the site of Fort Penon was built in 1544.

Algiers was a walled city from the time of the deys until the close of the 19th century. The French, after their occupation of the city (1830), built a rampart, parapet and ditch, with two terminal forts, Bab Azoun باب عزون to the south and Bab-el-Oued اد to the north. The forts and part of the ramparts were demolished at the beginning of the 20th century, when a line of forts occupying the heights of Bouzaréah بوزريعة (at an elevation of 396 metres (1,299 ft) above the sea) took their place.

Notre Dame d'Afrique, a church built (1858–1872) in a mixture of the Roman and Byzantine styles, is conspicuously situated overlooking the sea, on the shoulder of the Bouzaréah hills, 3 km (2 mi) to the north of the city. Above the altar is a statue of the Virgin depicted as a black woman. The church also contains a solid silver statue of the archangel Michael, belonging to the confraternity of Neapolitan fishermen.

Villa Abd-el-Tif, former residence of the dey, was used during the French period, to accommodate French artists, chiefly painters, and winners of the Abd-el-Tif prize, among whom Maurice Boitel, for a while of two years. Nowadays, Algerian artists are back in the villa's studios.

=== Monuments ===
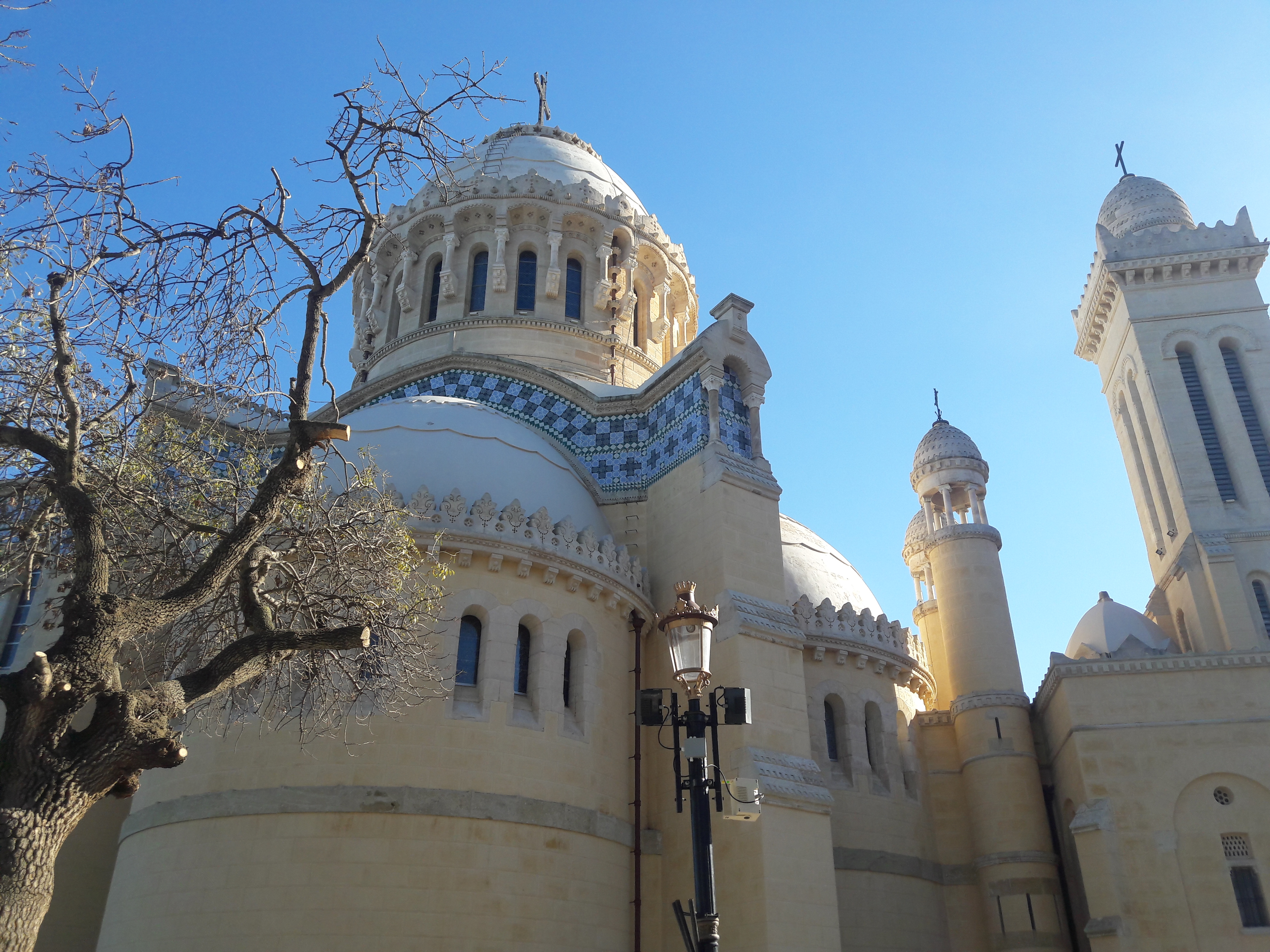
Basilica of Our Lady of Africa – Algiers

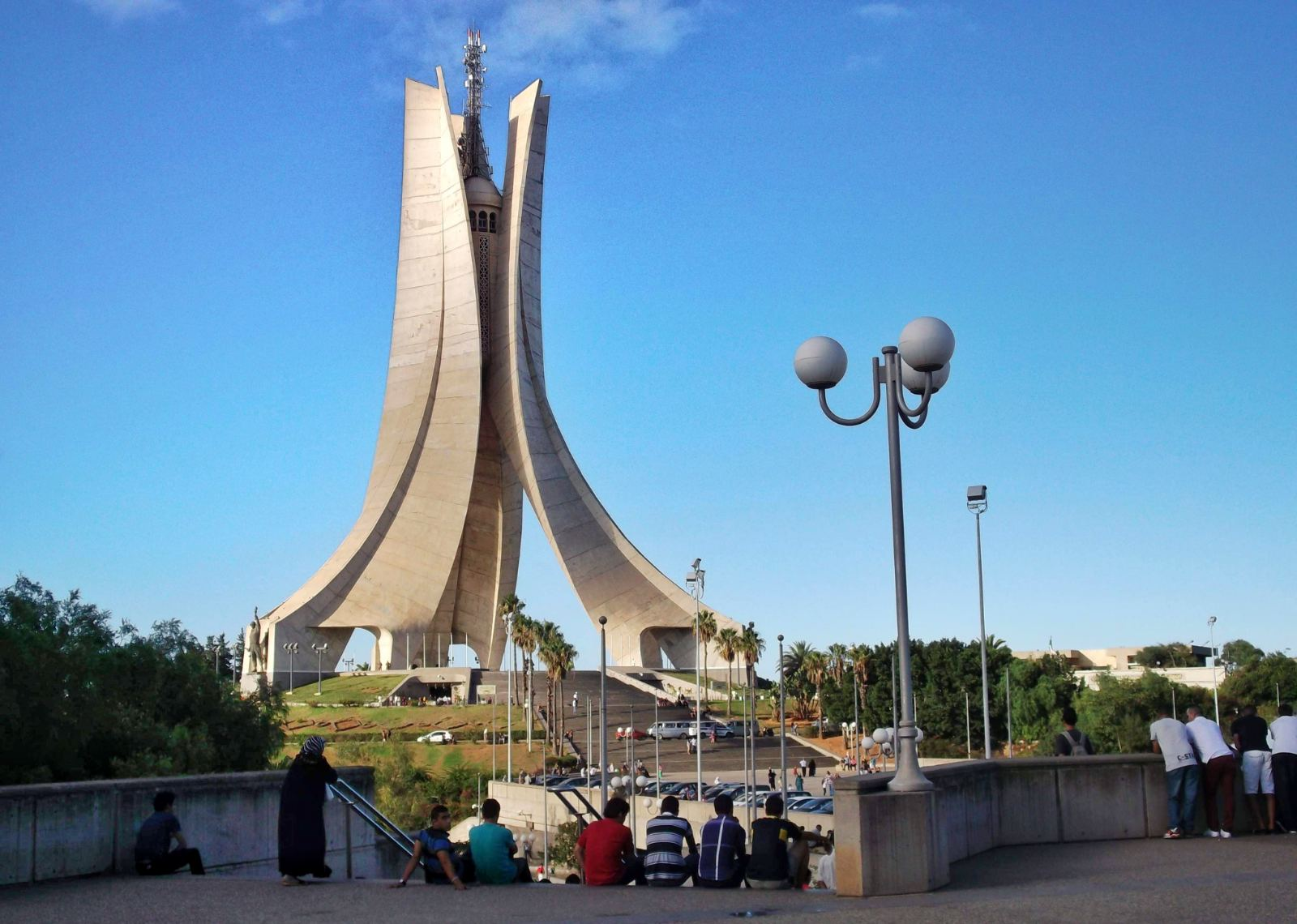
The Monument of the Martyrs (Maquam E'chahid)

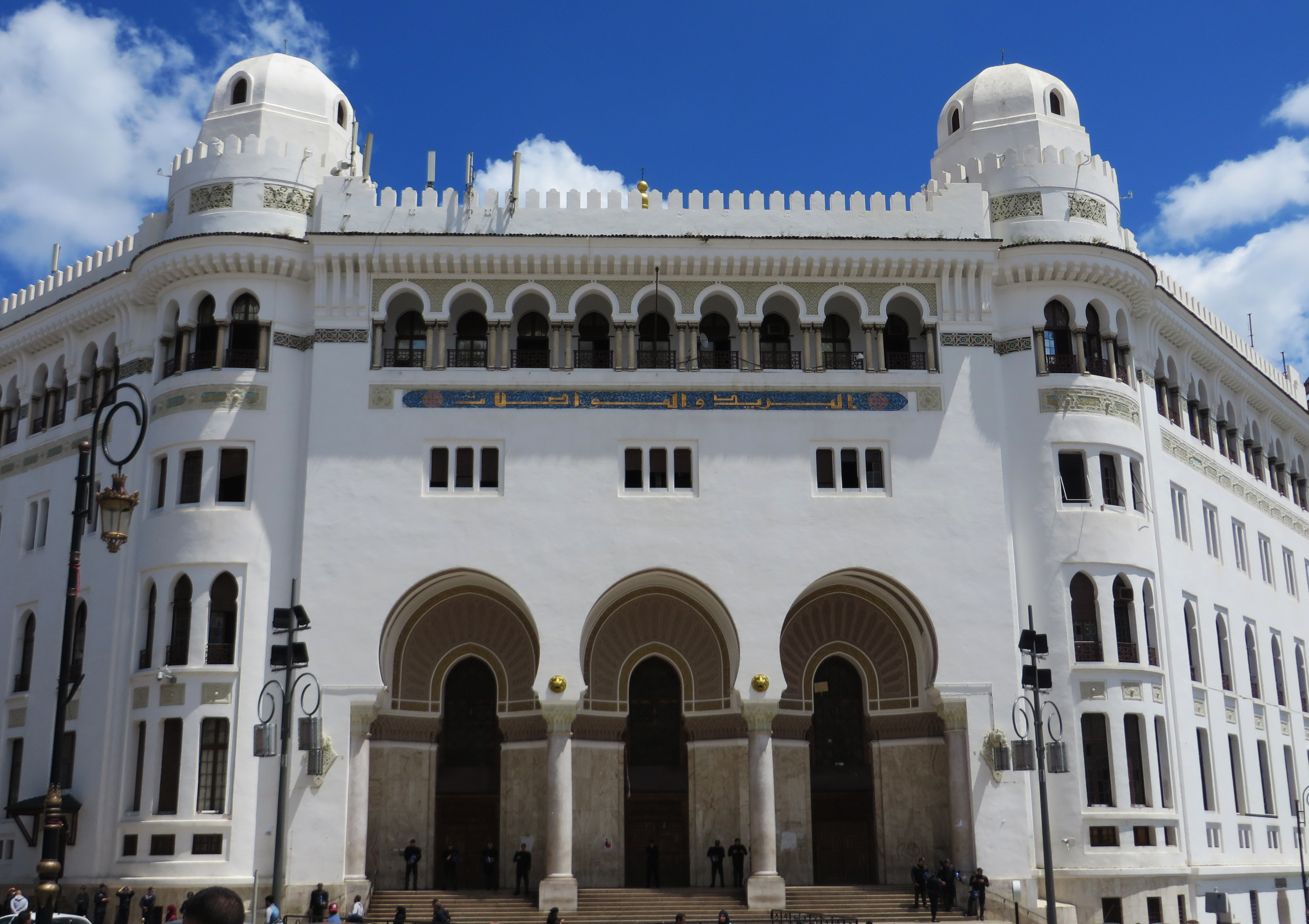
Grand Post Office

- Notre Dame d'Afrique, accessible by one cable car, is one of the city's most outstanding monuments: located in the district of Z' will ghara, the basilica was built around 1858.
- Monument des Martyrs (Marquand E' chahid): an iconic concrete monument commemorating the Algerian war for independence. The monument was opened in 1982 on the 20th anniversary of Algeria's independence. It is fashioned in the shape of three standing palm leaves which shelter the "Eternal Flame" beneath. At the edge of each palm leaf stands a statue of a soldier, each representing a stage of Algeria's struggle.

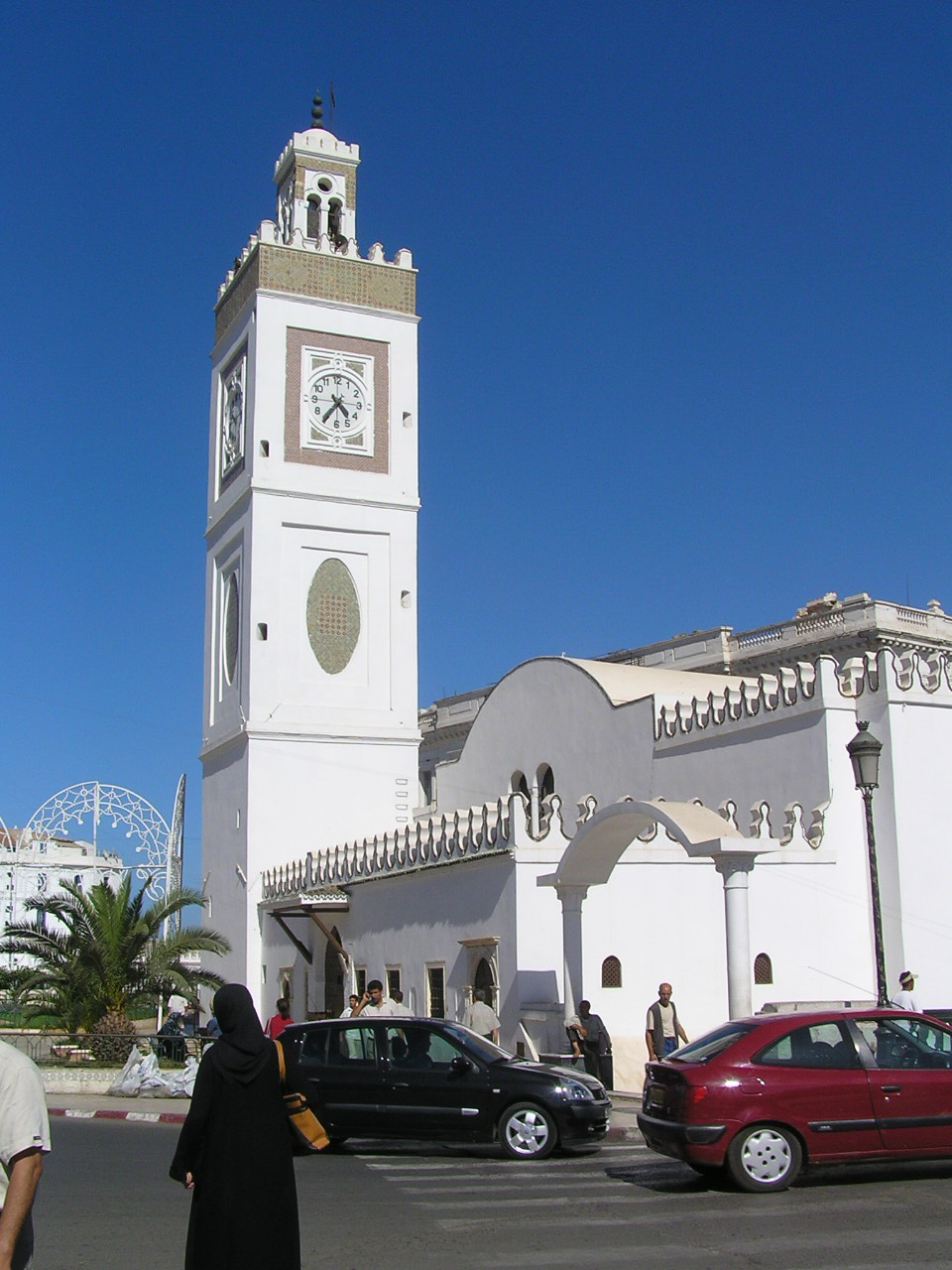
The El Jedid mosque at the Place des Martyrs

- The El Jedid mosque at the Place des Martyrs near the port.
- Place of the Emir Abdelkader (formerly Bugeaud): in memory of the famous emir Abd El-Kader, resistant during French conquest of Algeria.
- Grand Post Office (1910, by Voinot and Tondoire): construction of the neo-Moorish type which is in full centre town of Algiers.
- The Jardin d'essai (Garden of Test; El-Hamma): situated in the east of Algiers, it extends over 80 hectares (198 acres) and contains exotic plants and gardens. It was created in 1832 by A. Hardy.
- Villa Abd-el-Hair, with the top of the Garden of test, one of the old residences of the dey, where until 1962, were placed the artists prizes winner of Price Abd-el-Hair, and in particular Maurice Boitel and Andre Hamburg.
- Citadel.
- Riadh El-Feth (shopping centre and art gallery).
- Ketchaoua Mosque (This mosque became the Saint-Philippe cathedral during colonization before becoming again a mosque).
- National Library, is in the district of El HAMMA and was built in the 1990s.
- Djamaa el Kebir at the Rue de la Marine. It is the oldest mosque of Algiers and was built during the reign of the Almoravid sultan Yusuf ibn Tashfin.
- Le Bastion 23 – Palais des Rais, built in 1576 by Dey Ramdhan Pacha and located in the lower Casbah in the Bab El Oued neighborhood.

== Demographics ==
| Year | Population |
|---|---|
| 1977 (Census) | 1,523,000 |
| 1987 (Census) | 1,507,241 |
| 1998 (Census) | 2,086,212 |
| 2008 (Census) | 2,364,230 |

As of 2012, Algiers has a population of about 3,335,418.

The ethnic distribution is 53% from an Arabic-speaking background, 44% from a Berber-speaking background and 3% foreign-born.

== Economy ==
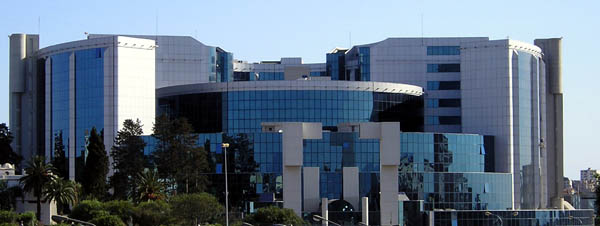
Ministry of Finance of Algeria

Algiers is an important economic, commercial and financial center, with a stock exchange capitalized at 60 million euros. Algiers contributes to 20% of Algeria's GDP (51 Billions $ in 2024.) The city has the highest cost of living of any city in North Africa, as well as the 50th highest worldwide, as of March 2007, having gained one position compared to the previous year.

Mohamed Ben Ali El Abbar, president of the Council of Administration of the Emirate Group EMAAR, presented five "megaprojects" to Algerian President Abdelaziz Bouteflika, during a ceremony which took place Saturday, 15 July, in the People's Palace of Algiers. These projects will transform the city of Algiers and its surroundings by equipping them with a retail area and restoration and leisure facilities.

The first project will concentrate on the reorganization and the development of the infrastructures of the railway station "Aga" located in the downtown area. The ultramodern station intended to accommodate more than 80.000 passengers per day, will become a centre of circulation in the heart of the grid system, surrounded by commercial offices and buildings and hotels intended for travellers in transit. A shopping centre and three high-rise office buildings rising with the top of the commercial zone will accompany the project.

The second project will not relate to the bay of Algiers and aims to revitalize the sea front. The development of the 44 km (27 mi) sea front will include marinas, channels, luxury hotels, offices, apartments of great standing, luxury stores and leisure amenities. A crescent-shaped peninsula will be set up on the open sea. The project of the bay of Algiers will also comprise six small islands, of which four of round form, connected to each other by bridges and marinas and will include tourist and residential complexes.

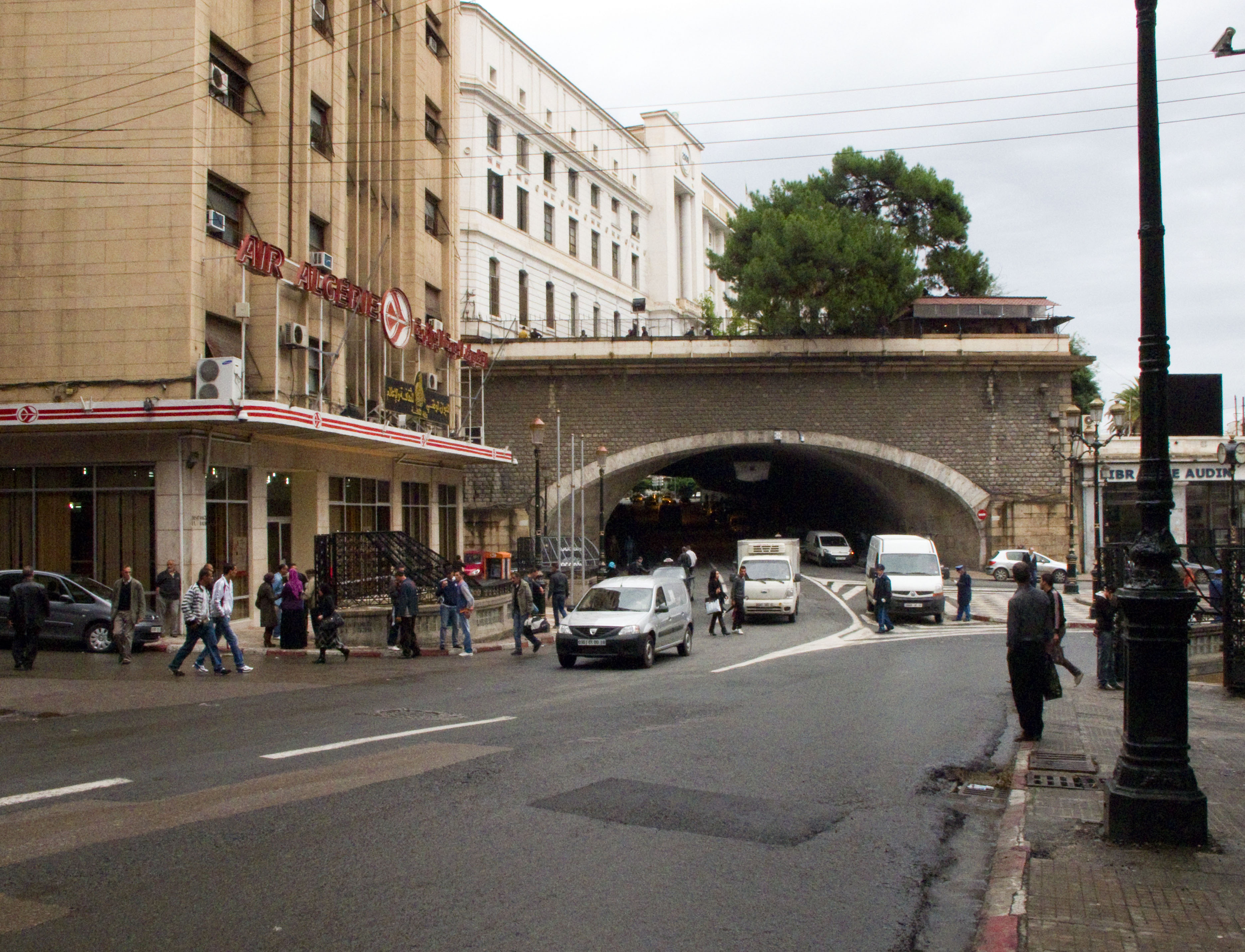
Air Algérie head office in Place Audin near the University of Algiers, in Alger-Centre

The third project will relate to restructuring an area of Algiers, qualified by the originators of the project of "city of wellness". El Abbar indicated to the journalists that the complex would be "agreeable for all those which will want to combine tourism and well-being or tourism and relaxation". The complex will include a university, a research center and a medical centre. It should also include a hospital complex, a care centre, a hotel zone, an urban centre and a thermal spa with villas and apartments. The university will include a medical school and a school for care male nurses which will be able to accommodate 500 students. The university campus will have the possibility of seeing setting up broad ranges of buildings of research laboratories and residences.

Another project relates to technological implantation of a campus in Sidi Abdellah, 25 km (16 mi) south-east from Algiers. This 90 hectares (222 acres) site will include shopping centres, residential zones with high standard apartments and a golf course surrounded by villas and hotels. Two other residential zones, including 1.800 apartments and 40 high standard villas, will be built on the surrounding hills.

The fifth project is that of the tourist complex Colonel Abbès, which will be located 25 km (16 mi) west from Algiers. This complex will include several retail zones, meeting places, and residential zones composed of apartments and villas with views of the sea.

There is another project under construction, by the name of Algiers Medina. The first step of the project is nearly complete.

A Hewlett-Packard office for French-speaking countries in Africa is in Algiers.

== Tourist attractions ==
Algiers has many tourist attractions, the most notable of which are Algiers Opera House, the Algerian National Theater Mahieddine Bachtarzi, Bardo National Museum (Algiers), the National Museum of Fine Arts of Algiers, The National Museum of Antiquities and Islamic Art; the "National Museum of Miniatures, Illumination and Calligraphy" located inside of Dar Mustapha Pacha; "Palais des Rais"; Algerian Admiralty Museum; the Central Military Museum adjacent to Maqam Echahid (Martyrs Memorial), a breathtaking monument that sits above the Martyrs National Museum. Other landmarks include Djamaa el Djazaïr, the 3rd biggest mosque in the world; Botanical Garden Hamma; Culture Palace Moufdi Zakaria; Grande Poste d'Alger, located adjacent to Kilometre zero; Ketchaoua Mosque; Notre-Dame d'Afrique; Emir Abdelkader Square as well as Martyr's Square. The city also contains a UNESCO World Heritage Site, the Casbah or citadel, that is a prominent example of Casbah and Medina.

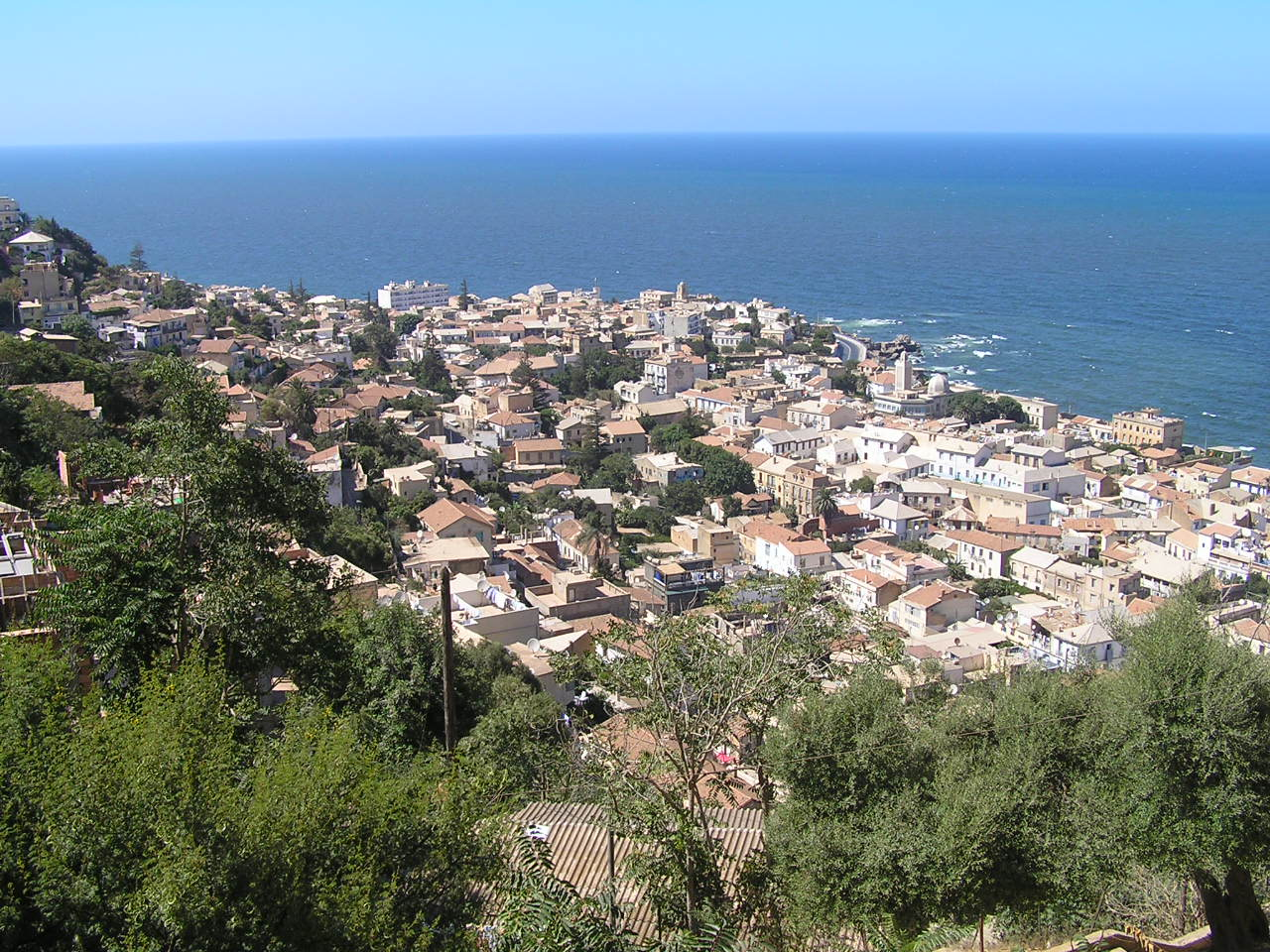
Panorama of the city as seen from Bologhine district

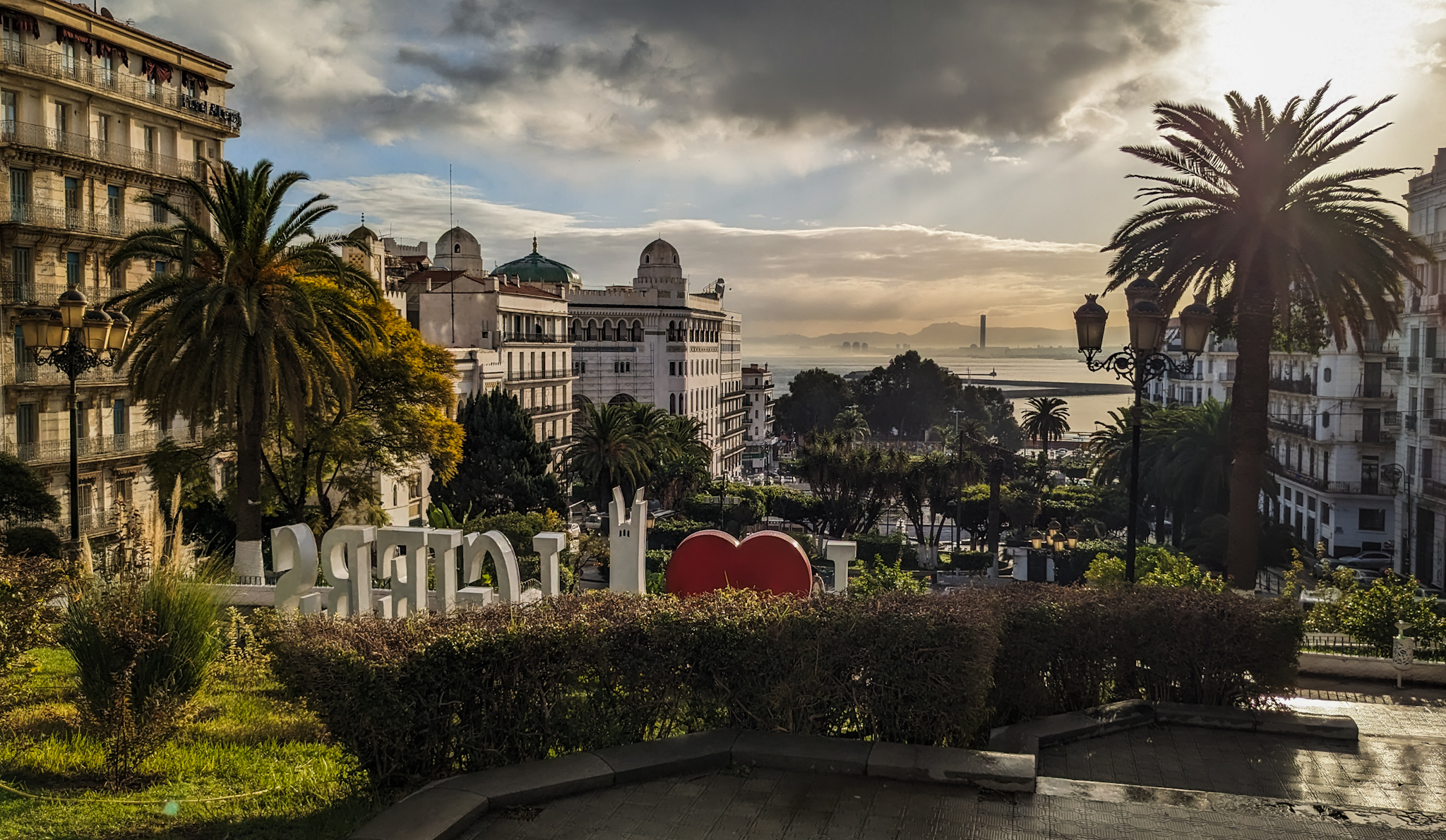
Morning view of Algiers

Some 20 km (12 mi) to the west of Algiers are such seaside resorts as Sidi Fredj (ex-Sidi Ferruch), Palm Beach, Douaouda, Zéralda, and the Club of the Pines (residence of State); there are tourist complexes, Algerian and other restaurants, souvenir shops, supervised beaches, and other amenities. The city is also equipped with important hotel complexes such as the hotel Hilton, El-Aurassi or El Djazair. Algiers also has the first water park in the country. The tourism of Algiers is growing but is not as developed as that of the larger cities in Morocco or Tunisia.

== Education ==
The presence of a large diplomatic community in Algiers prompted the creation of multiple international educational institutions. These schools include :

- American International School of Algiers;
- British School Algiers
- El Kalimat School (English-language school);
- Lycée International Alexandre-Dumas d'Alger (French school);
- Roma Italian School of Algiers;
- Russian Embassy School in Algiers.

There was formerly the École japonaise d'Alger (アルジェ日本人学校 Aruje Nihonjin Gakkō), a school for Japanese children.

== Infrastructure ==
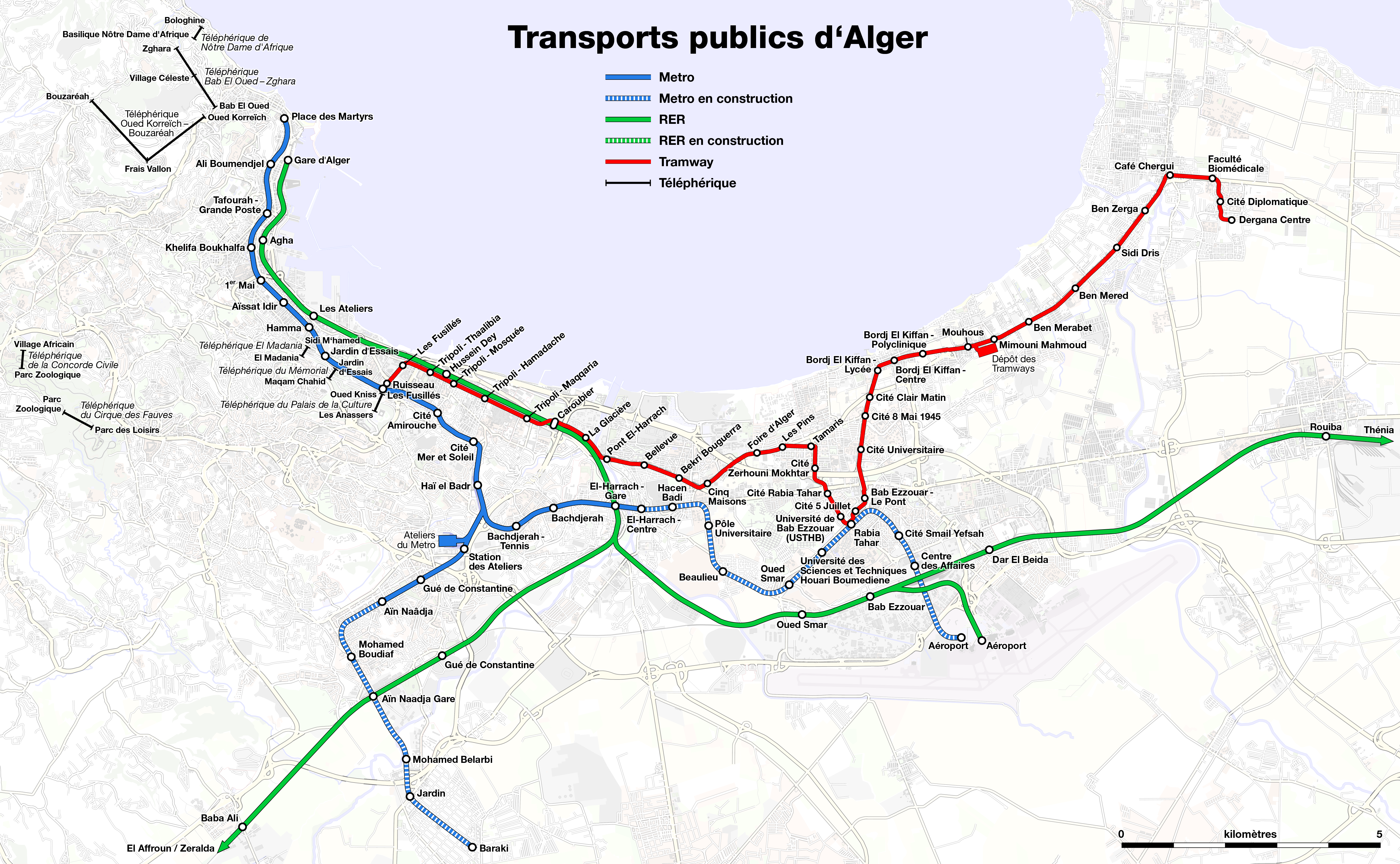
Public transport of Algiers

=== Transport ===
- ETUSA (urban and suburban bus transportation for Algiers) operates bus service in Algiers and the surrounding suburbs. 54 lines are operating, with service from 5:30 a.m. to 12:45 a.m.

Algiers metro

==== Railways ====
Opened on 1 November 2011, Algiers Metro is the city's rapid transit system (Metro) that is currently servicing 5 districts of the city (Bab El Oued, Sidi M'Hamed, Hussein Dey, El Harrach, Bir Mourad Raïs) by Line 1 providing 19 stations with a total length of 18.5 km. It has played a vital role in easing traffic congestions and transit demand and connectivity in urbansised Algiers from downtown to neighbourhoods in the western and southern areas of the city.

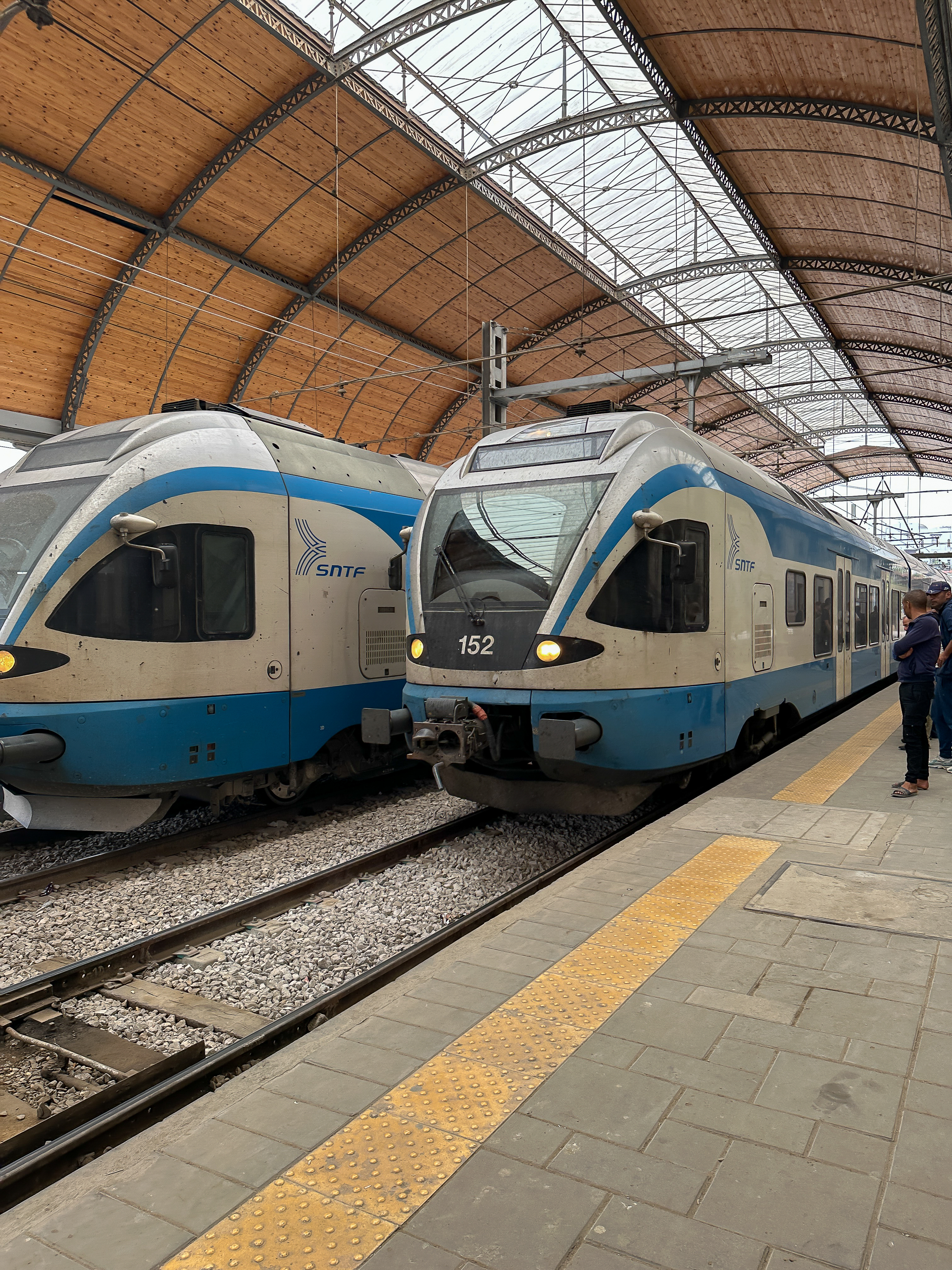
Train in Algiers station

SNTF (national railroad company) operates commuter-rail lines connecting the capital to the surrounding suburbs.

The city is serviced by a large network of expressways, highways, trunk roads, and even

- Algiers tramway, opened on 8 May 2011.
- Houari Boumediene Airport is located 20 km (12 mi) from the city. The airport serves domestics, many European cities, West Africa, the Middle East, Asia and North America. On 5 July 2006, a new international air terminal was opened for service. The terminal is managed by Aéroports de Paris.

4 urban beltways:

- El Madania – Belouizdad
- Notre Dame d'Afrique – Bologhine
- Memorial des Martyres/Riad el Feth – Jardin d'essais
- Palais de la culture – Oued Kniss

== Sports ==
Algiers is the sporting centre of Algeria. The city has a number of professional clubs in the variety of sports, which have won national and international titles. Among the sports facilities within the city, there is an enormous sporting complex – Complex of OCO – Mohamed Boudiaf. This includes the Stade 5 Juillet 1962 (capacity 64,000), a venue for athletics, an Olympic swimming pool, a multisports room (the Cupola), an 18-hole golf course, and several tennis courts.

Stade 5 Juillet 1962

The following major sporting events have been held in Algiers (not-exhaustive list):

- Mediterranean Games 1975.
- All-Africa Games 1978, 2007.
- African Cup of Nations 1990.
- African Handball Nations Championship 1989, 2001.
- Pan Arab Games 2004.
- FIBA Africa Championship 2005.
- Men's U19 World Championship 2005.

=== Football clubs ===
Major association football club based in Algiers include:

- MC Alger
- CR Belouizdad
- USM Alger

== International relations ==
=== Twin towns – sister cities ===
Algiers is twinned with:

- Montreal, Canada
- Sofia, Bulgaria

In addition, many of the wards and cities within Algiers maintain sister-city relationships with other foreign cities.

=== Cooperation agreements ===
Algiers has cooperation agreements with:

- Lisbon, Portugal
- Paris, France

== Films about Algiers ==
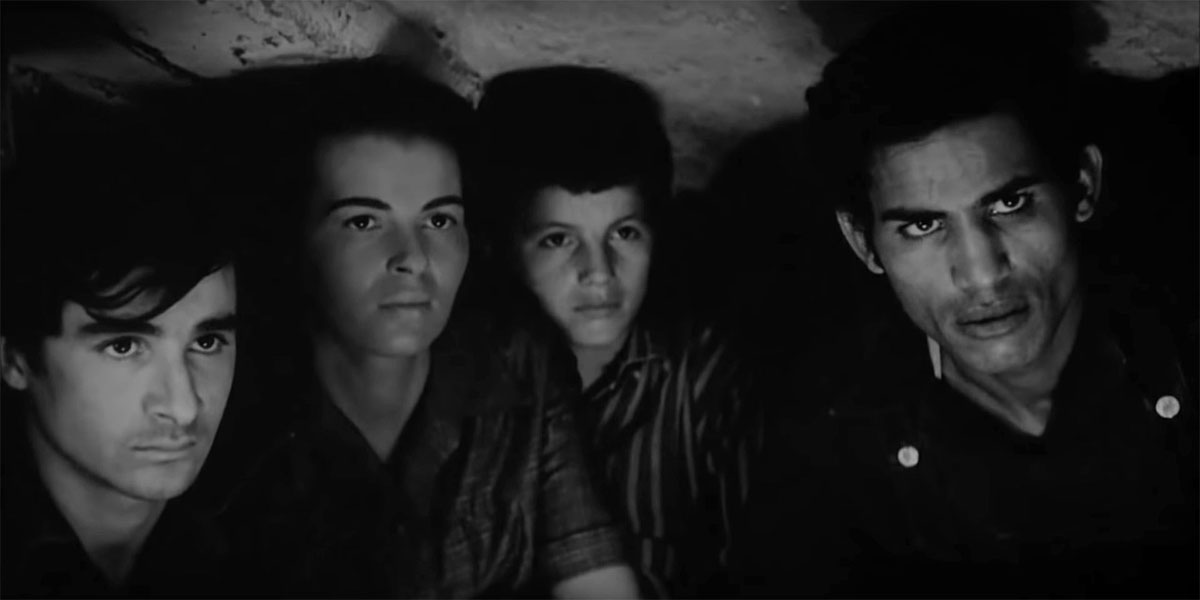
The Battle of Algiers (1966), Italian-Algerian movie by Gillo Pontecorvo.

- Algiers, 1938, starring Charles Boyer and Hedy Lamarr, and directed by John Cromwell;
- Jamila, the Algerian, 1958, directed by Youssef Chahine,
- The Battle of Algiers, 1966, directed by Gillo Pontecorvo;
- Tahya ya Didou, Alger Insolite, 1970, Mohammed Zinet;
- Bab El-Oued City, 1994, directed by Merzak Allouache;
- Viva Laldjérie, 2003, directed by Nadir Moknèche, with Biyouna and Lubna Azabal;
- Bab el Web, 2004, directed by Merzak Allouache, with Samy Naceri, Julie Gayet, Faudel;
- Once upon a time in the Oued, 2005, directed by Djamel Bensalah;
- Beur, White, Red, 2005, directed by Mahmoud Zemmouri.
- Délice Paloma, 2007, directed by Nadir Moknèche, with Biyouna and Nadia Kaci.
- Abbott and Costello in the Foreign Legion, 1950, starring Bud Abbott and Lou Costello.
- Carry On Spying 1964, directed by Gerald Thomas with Kenneth Williams, Charles Hawtrey, Barbara Windsor & Renée Houston

== Notable people ==
- Sidi Abd al-Rahman al-Tha'alibi, 15th-century theologian and sufi.
- Sidi Ahmed Zouaoui, 15th-century theologian and sufi.
- Raphael Zeror (1681–1737), Algerian rabbi
- Sidi M'hamed Bou Qobrine, 18th-century theologian and sufi.
- Mohamed ben Zamoum, 19th-century resistant against French colonization.
- Khalid ibn Hashim, 19th-20th-century resistant against French colonization.
- Albert Camus 20th-century Nobel Laureate
- Abdelhalim Bensmaia, 20th-century scholar, reformist, humanist and musician.
- Lyès Deriche, 20th-century leader of the Algerian national political movement.
- Brahim Boushaki, 20th-century theologian and sufi.
- Ali La Pointe, 20th-century militant of the Algerian national political movement.
- Mohamed Aïchaoui, 20th-century militant of the Algerian national political movement.
- Mohamed Seghir Boushaki, 20th-century leader of the Algerian national political movement.
- El Hadj M'Hamed El Anka, 20th-century artist.
- Ahmed Mahsas, 20th-century leader of the Algerian national political movement.
- Hocine Mezali, 20th-21st-century journalist and writer.
- Djamila Bouhired, 20th-century militant of the Algerian national political movement.
- Hassiba Ben Bouali, 20th-century militant of the Algerian national political movement.
- Mohamed Belouizdad, 20th-century leader of the Algerian national political movement against the French.
- Djamila Boupacha, 20th-century militant of the Algerian national political movement.
- Mohamed Bencheneb, 20th-century professor, writer and historian.
- Mourad Didouche, 20th-century leader of the Algerian national political movement.
- Islam Slimani, footballer
- Ali Haroun, 20th-century politician and lawyer.
- Mohamed Missouri, 20th-century boxer and coach.
- Hamdan Khodja, 19th-century dignitary and scholar.
- Mohamed Belhocine, 20th-21st-century professor of internal medicine and epidemiology.
- Amine ibn El Boushaki, 20th-21st-century judoka.
- Jeanine Belkhodja, doctor and activist
- Amina Belouizdad, 20th-century television presenter.
- Ali Fawzi Rebaine, 21st-century politician and doctor.
- Mohamed Arkab, 20th-21st-century politician and engineer.
- Rezki Zerarti, 20th-21st-century painter.
- Gaston Ricci (1869–1952), French politician, born in Algiers.
- Henri Fiori (1881–1963), French politician, born in Algiers.
- Raymond Laquière (1881–1973), French politician, born in Algiers.
- Jean-Marie Guastavino (1886–1960), French politician, born in Algiers.
- Marguerite Bernes (1901–1996), Roman Catholic nun recognised as Righteous Among the Nations
- Mustapha Khedali (1934–2008), Algerian football player and manager
- Jean-Claude Guillebaud (1944–2025), French writer, essayist and journalist, born in Algiers.
- Alain Dorval (1946–2024), French voice actor. He dubbed Sylvester Stallone in French versions.
- Abdelatif Alouach (born 1976), freediver
- Lotfi Laggoun (born 1984 in Alger), footballer
- Lyna Khoudri (born 1992), Algerian-French actress
- Arezki Hamza Dembri (born 2004), Algerian footballer
- Tony Gatlif (born 1948), French film director

== See also ==
- Barbary pirates
- Botanical Garden Hamma
- List of Ottoman governors of Algiers
- Bologhine Forest
- Réghaïa forest
