= Tourism in Algeria =

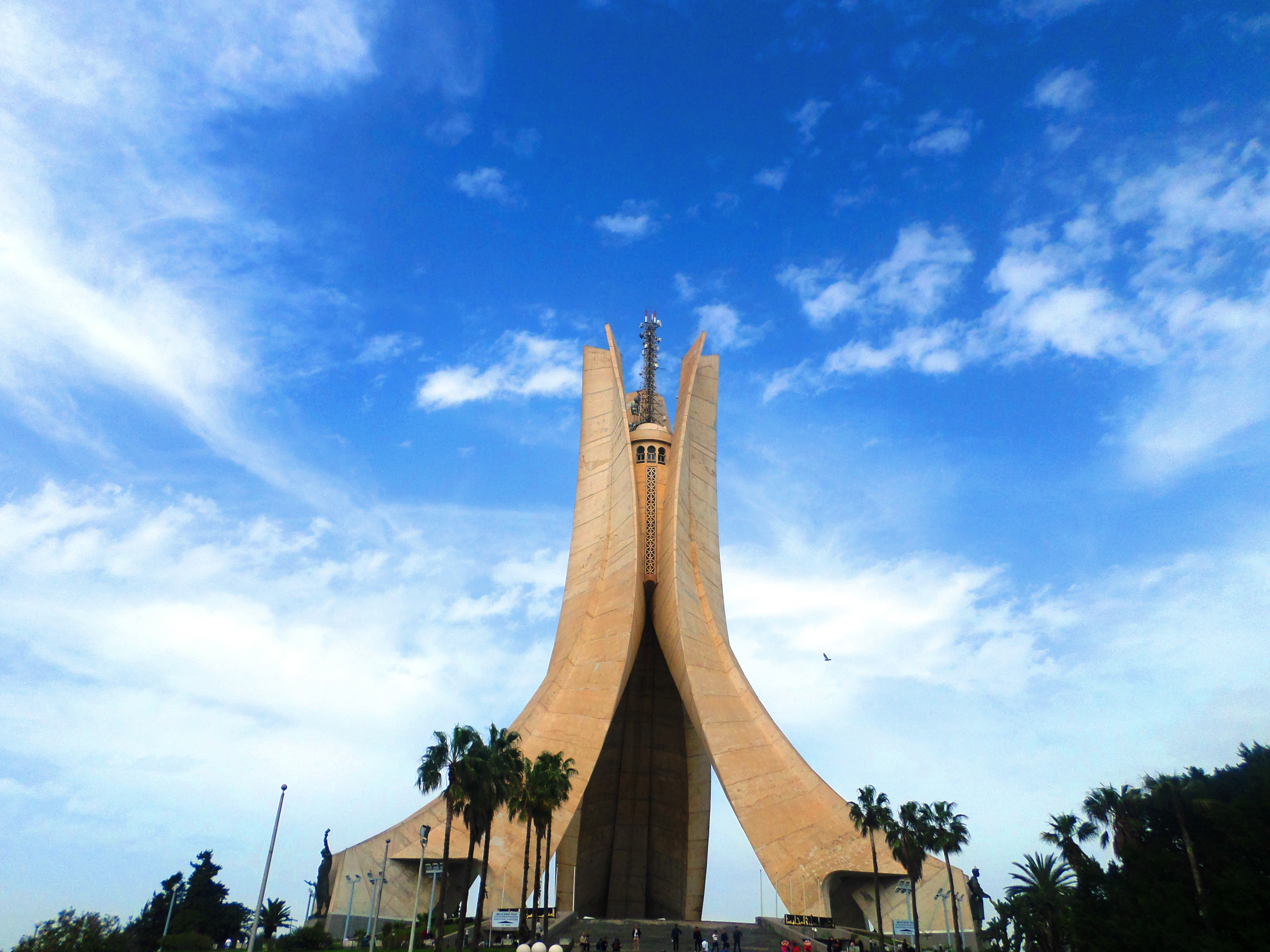
The Martyrs' Memorial a concrete monument commemorating the Algerian War.

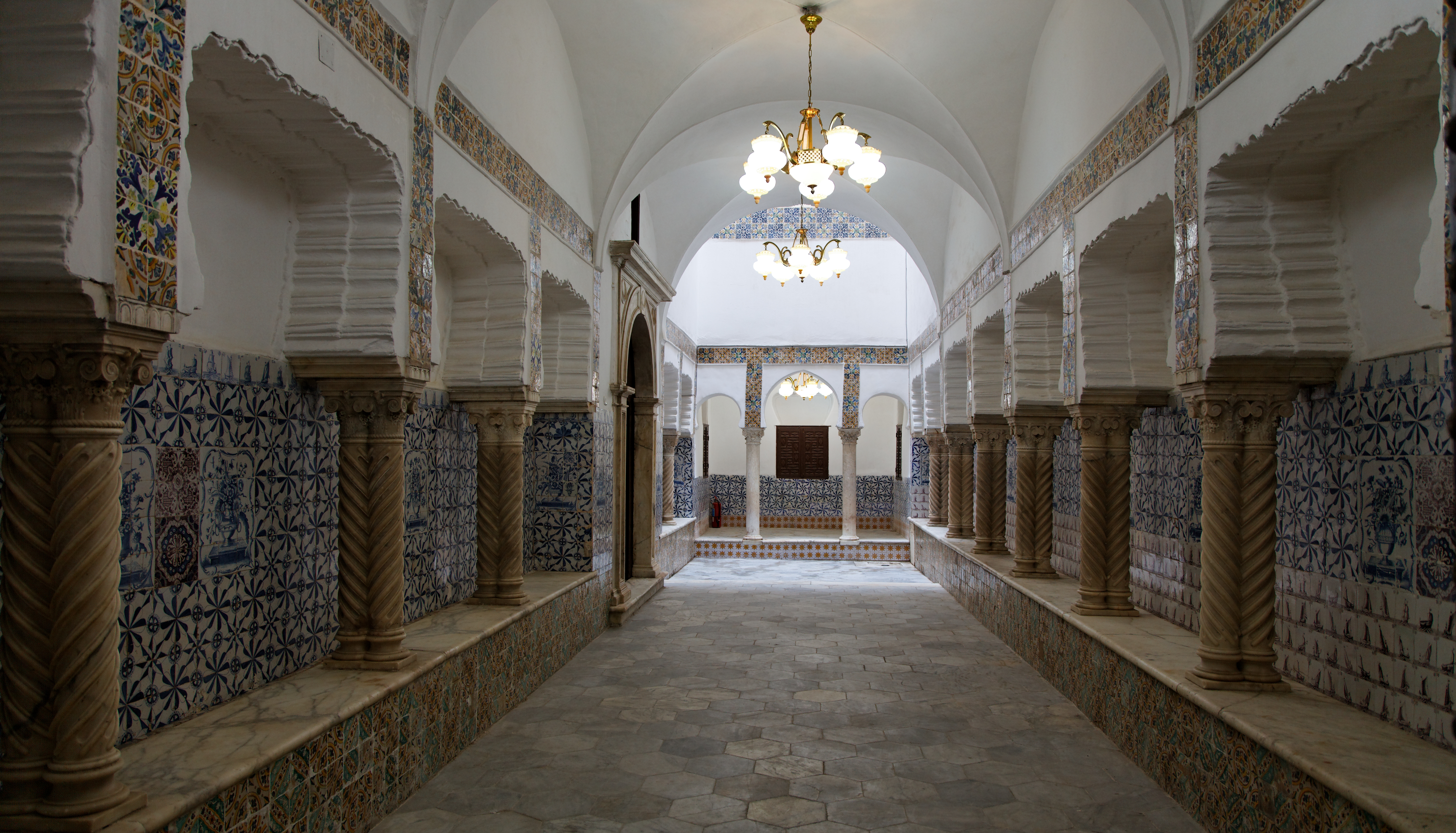
Casbah of Algiers a UNESCO world heritage site.

Algeria is the largest country in Africa; one of the main tourist attractions is the Sahara, the largest desert in the world. Algeria has been a member of the World Tourism Organization since 1976. According to a report of the World Tourism Organization published in 2014, Algeria was the 4th largest tourist destination in Africa in 2013 with 2.7 million foreign tourists, and ranks 111th on the international tourism scene, according to the London-based World Tourism and Travel Council (WTTC). The tourism sector in Algeria accounts for 3.9% of the volume of exports, 9.5% of the productive investment rate and 8.1% of the gross domestic product.

The main competitors are other Mediterranean countries, the majority of which have developed a strong tourism-based economy. The tourism sector in Algeria remains weak concerning accommodation and other services. For this reason, the government launched a strategic plan to boost this sector entitled “The 2030 Master Plan for Tourism Development”.

According to the U.S. News & World Report, Algeria was ranked among the top 80 countries in the world in 2018.

The US national newspaper USA Today ranked Constantine among the eleven cities to visit the world in 2018. The newspaper was based on the experience of Sal Lavallo, one of the youngest people to have visited all 193 member states of the United Nations.

Tourist arrivals of 2023 in %

== Tourism policy of the state ==
A project developed during the "National and International Conference of Tourism" was born providing a new dynamics of reception and management of tourism in Algeria. This project is called (Horizon 2025). Foreign investors, mainly French, position themselves to dominate the market, focused mainly on a business clientele.

An initial advertising campaign was rolled out to attract investors and foreign customers, along with conferences, trade shows and commissions.

The World Cup-winning former footballer Zinedine Zidane of Algerian descent was also used for a new commercial carried out under the aegis of the telephony operator, Ooredoo Algeria, intended for an international audience.

A Quality Tourism Plan Algeria was adopted by the government but by the end of 2010, only 10% of tourist structures in Algeria have joined this program. Investors remain interested in the potential of the country, as well as the high authorities, as the representative of the Secretary-General of the World Tourism Organization (WTO), Frédéric Perret, told the conference of the International Tourism and Travel Exhibition held In Algeria in 2010, that the Algerian tourism sector has great potential thanks to its "Mediterranean beaches, its fascinating Djurdjura National Park, its human, cultural and historical treasures."

As part of the tourism development policy, 'Eductour' is regularly organized for the national and international.

== World Heritage Sites ==
Algeria is home to seven UNESCO World Heritage Sites.

Site	Image	Location	Criteria	Area ha (acre)	Adoption	Description
Beni Hammad Fort		M'sila Province, Algeria; 35°48′50″N 04°47′36″E	Cultural: (iii)	150 (370)	1980	The ruins of the first capital city of the Hammadid emirs, founded in 1007 and demolished in 1152, The mosque, whose prayer room has 13 aisles with eight bays, is one of the largest in Algeria.
Djémila		Sétif Province, Algeria; 36°19′14″N 5°44′12″E	Cultural: (iii)(iv)	31 (77)	1982	Djémila (formerly known as Cuicul) was a Roman town in a mountainous site, comprising a forum, temples, basilicas, triumphal arches and religious buildings and other structures, each adapted to a location 900 m (3,000 ft) above sea level.
Kasbah of Algiers		Algiers Province, Algeria; 36°47′00″N 3°03′37″E	Cultural: (ii)(v)	50 (120)	1982	The Kasbah of Algiers is a unique Islamic city on the Mediterranean coast. It contains remains of a citadel, medieval mosques and Ottoman palaces.
M'zab Valley		Ghardaïa Province, Algeria; 32°29′00″N 3°41′00″E	Cultural: (ii)(iii)(v)	4,000 (9,900)	1982	The intact, traditional human habitat was built around five ksour of the M'zab Valley in the 10th century by the Ibadites.
Tassili n'Ajjer		Illizi and Tamanrasset Provinces, Algeria; 25°30′00″N 9°00′00″E	Mixed: (i)(iii)(vii)(viii)	7,200,000 (18,000,000)	1982	A vast plateau on the edge of the Sahara, Tassili n'Ajjer contains more than 15,000 cave engravings that record climatic changes, animal migrations, and the evolution of human life, dating from 6,000 BCE to the first centuries CE. It is also noted for its eroded sandstone landforms.
Timgad		Batna Province, Algeria; 35°27′00″N 6°38′00″E	Cultural: (ii)(iii)(iv)	91 (220)	1982	Established by Emperor Trajan in 100 CE as a military colony, Timgad features cardo and decumanus streets, constituting a typical example of Roman town-planning.
Tipasa		Tipaza Province, Algeria; 36°32′00″N 2°22′00″E	Cultural: (iii)(iv)	52 (130)	1982	Previously a Carthaginian trading centre, Tipasa was conquered by the Romans and converted into a military base. The site also bears witness to paleochristian and Byzantine influences.

== Religious Sites ==
Religions of Algeria (2012)
Religions	percent
Islam (official; Sunni):	99%
Other (incl. Christian and Jewish):	1%

Religion in Algeria is dominated by Islam at about ninety-nine percent of the population. The vast majority of Muslims in Algeria adhere to Sunni Islam of Maliki school of jurisprudence. There are also almost 100,000 Christians, mostly Pentecostal Protestants. There are nearly 2,000 Jews living in Algeria, according to the US department of State.

This is a list of some of the best-known mosques and churches in Algeria:

=== Djamaâ El Djazaïr ===
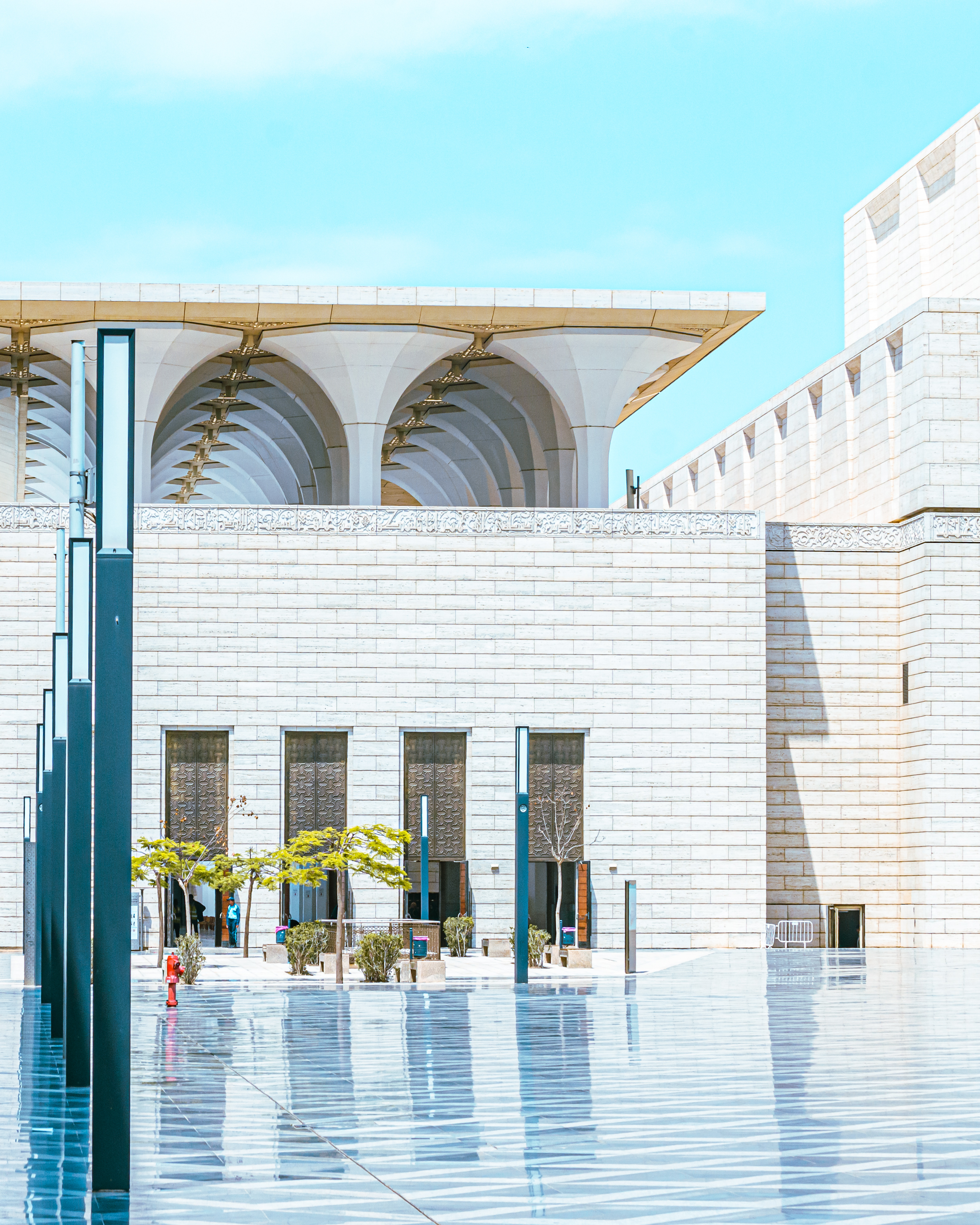
Djamaâ El Djazaïr

Djamaâ El Djazaïr (Mosque of Algeria, in Arabic: جامع الجزائر); or Great Mosque of Algeria (in Arabic: مسجد الجزائر الأعظم) is a mosque in the process of completion, located in Mohammedia in Algiers. It is the largest mosque in Algeria and Africa and the third largest mosque in the world by total area, after the Great Mosque of Mecca and the Al-Masjid an-Nabawi Mosque in Medina.

=== Ketchaoua Mosque ===
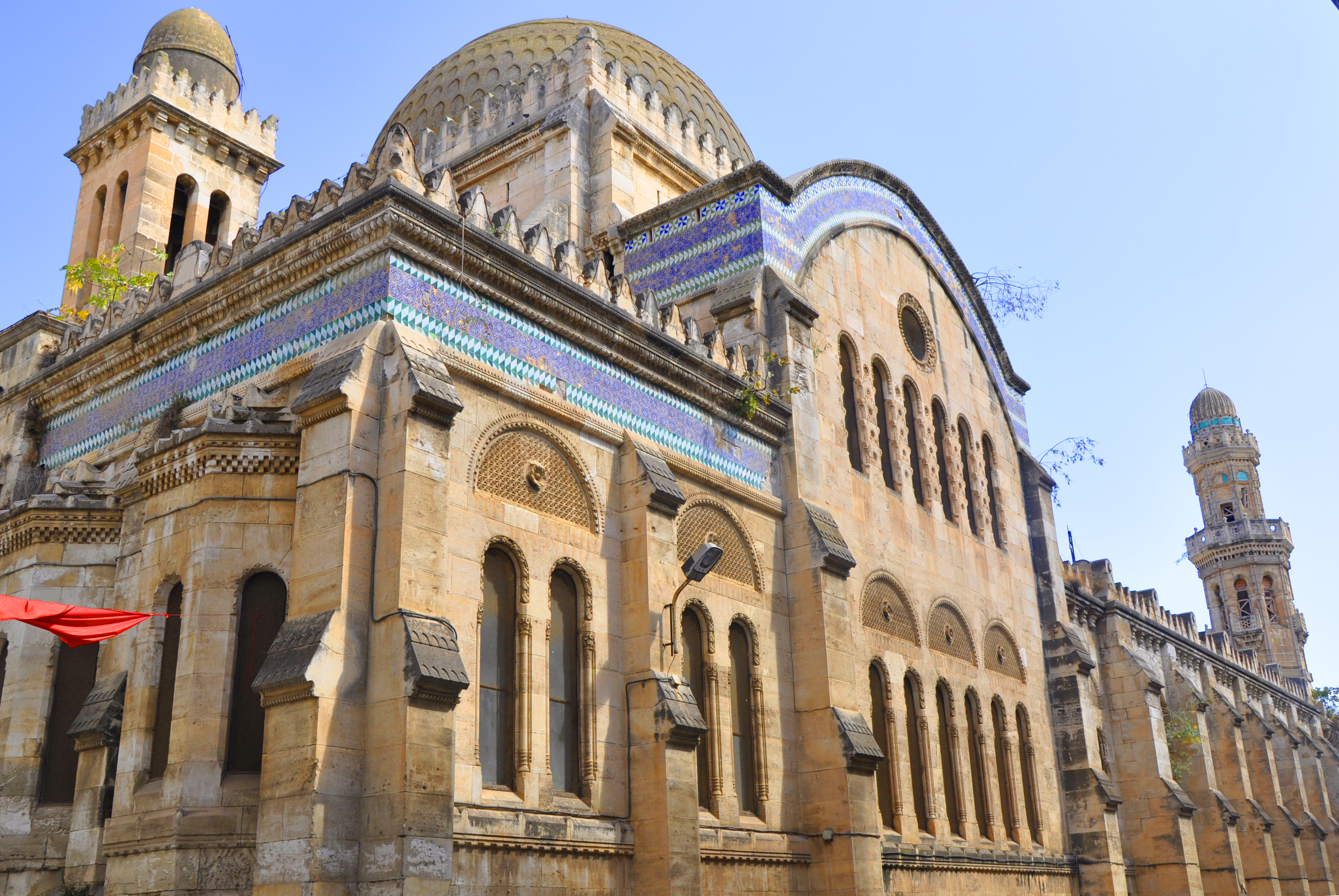
Ketchaoua Mosque

Ketchaoua Mosque is a mosque in Algiers. It is located at the foot of the Casbah, which was built during the Ottoman rule in the 17th century, which is a UNESCO World Heritage Site. The mosque stands on the first of the Casbah's many steep stairways, and was logistically and symbolically the cynosure of the pre-colonial city of Algiers. The mosque is noted for its unique fusion of Moorish and Byzantine architecture.

=== Notre-Dame d'Afrique ===
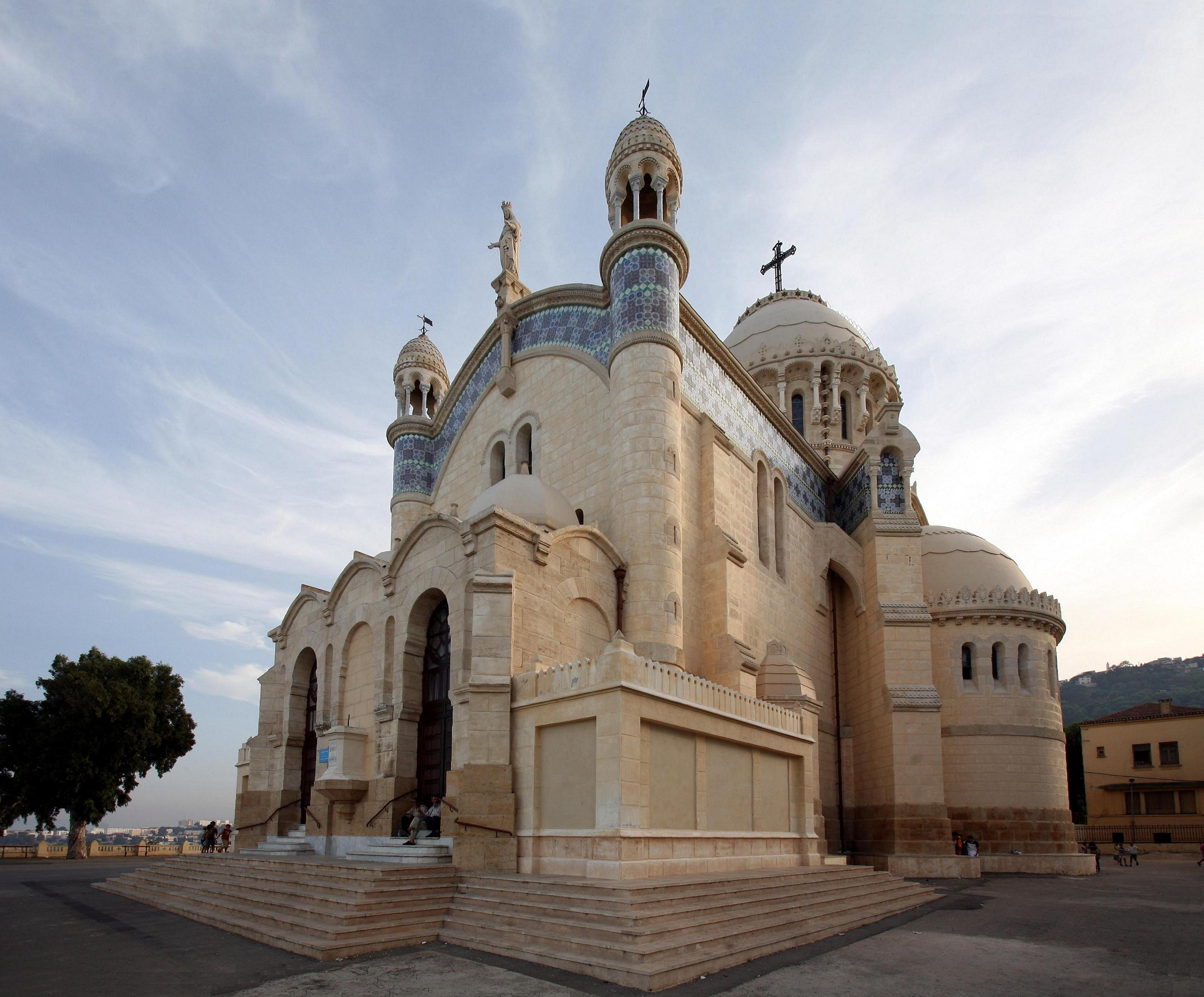
Notre-Dame d'Afrique (Our Lady of Africa)

Notre-Dame d'Afrique (Our Lady of Africa) is a Roman Catholic basilica in Algiers. Louis-Antoine-Augustin Pavy, who served as the Bishop of Algiers from 1846 to 1866, paved the way for its construction. The basilica was inaugurated in 1872, after fourteen years of construction. It was founded by Charles Lavigerie. Its architect, Jean-Eugène Fromageau, who had been appointed the chief architect for ecclesiastical buildings in French Algeria in 1859, employed a Neo-Byzantine style. Its floor plan is unusual as the choir is situated on the southeast instead of the usual east side of the building.

=== 1st November of 1954 Great Mosque ===
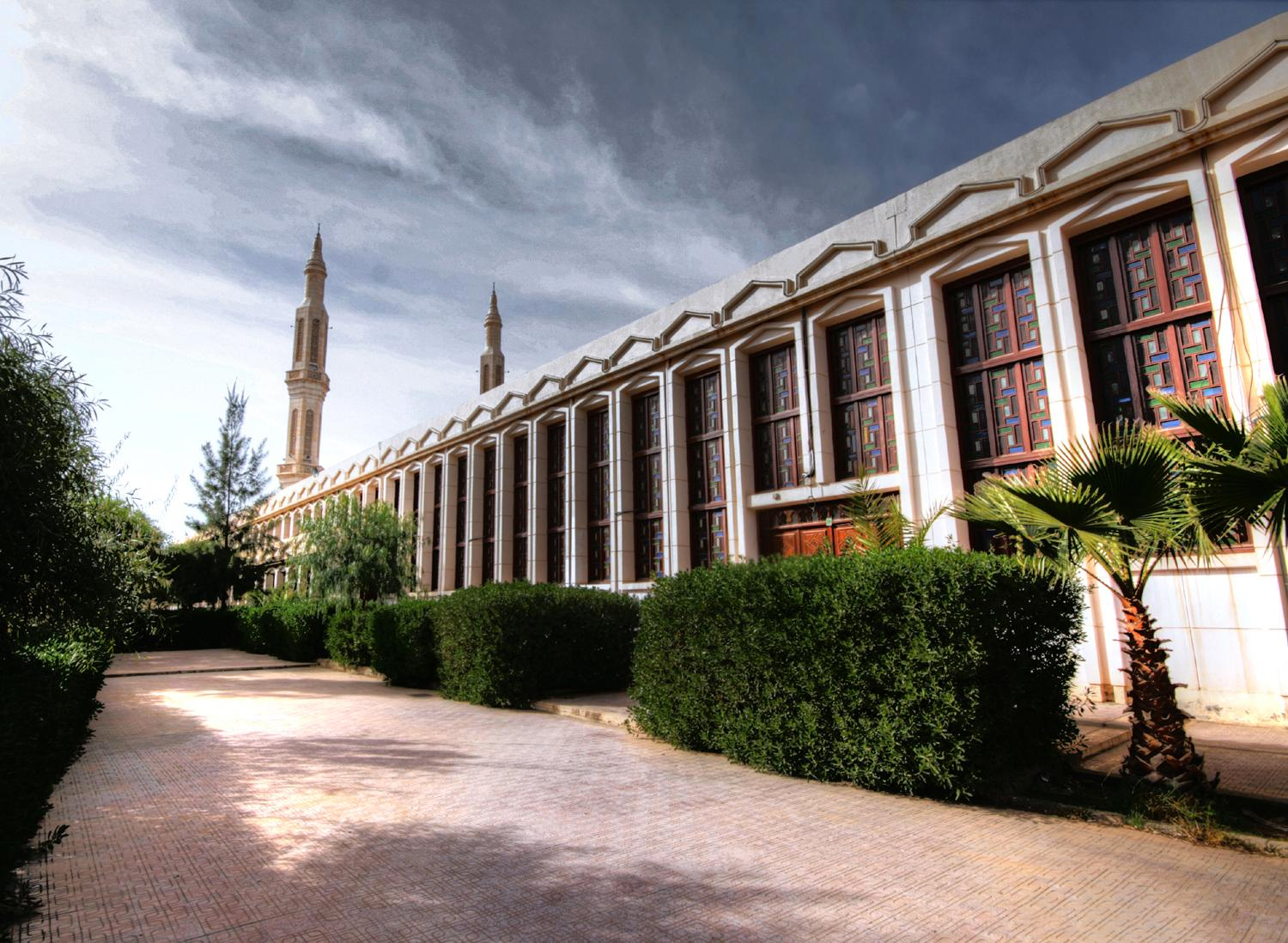
1st November of 1954 Great Mosque

1st November of 1954 Great Mosque is considered to be the largest mosque in Algeria and the second in Africa It is located in the town of Batna. This imposing religious building has been open to the faithful since 2003 and is one of the great architectural achievements of the city.

=== Saint Augustin Basilica ===
The Basilique Saint Augustin (Basilica of St Augustine) is a Roman Catholic basilica and Pro-cathedral dedicated to Saint Augustine of Hippo located in Annaba, Algeria. The basilica is under the circumscription of the Diocese of Constantine. Construction of the basilica began in 1881 and finished on March 29, 1900, though the church was not dedicated until April 24, 1914. The statue of St. Augustine in the basilica contains one of his arm bones. It was built not far from the remains of the Basilica Pacis built by Saint Augustine, where he died while the city was besieged by Vandals.

=== Cathédrale du Sacré-Cœur d'Oran ===
Cathédrale du Sacré-Cœur d'Oran is a Roman Catholic church located on the Place de la Kahina, on Boulevard Hammou-boutlelis, in Oran.

=== Djama'a al-Djedid ===
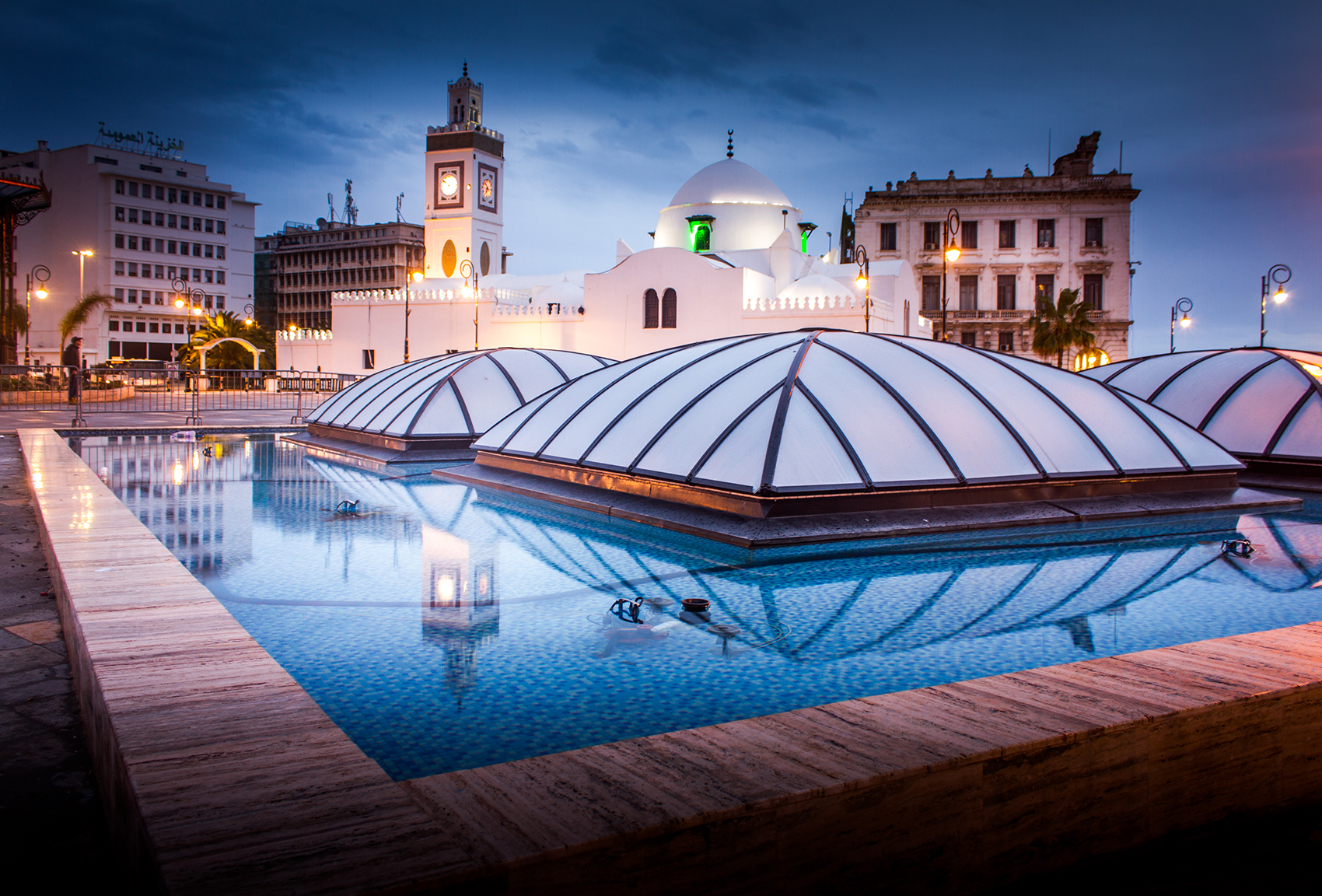
Djama'a al-Djedid

Djama'a al-Djedid, also referred to as the Jamaa al-Jadid, Jamaa El Jedid, or the New Mosque, (Turkish: Yeni Camii, meaning New Mosque) is an Ottoman mosque located in Algiers, the capital of Algeria. It was built in 1660 in accordance with the traditions of the Hanafi school. During the French colonial rule, the mosque was called the Mosquée de la Pêcherie and in English the Mosque of the Fisherman's Wharf.

=== Great Mosque of Tlemcen ===
Great Mosque of Tlemcen was first built in Tlemcen, Algeria in 1082. It is one of the best-preserved examples of Almoravid architecture. It was built under sultan Yusuf ibn Tashfin but substantially reconstructed and enlarged by his son Ali ibn Yusuf. An inscription dates this reconstruction to 1136. Sultan Yaghmoracen (1236-1283), the founder of the Abdalwadid dynasty of Tlemcen added a section with a minaret and a dome in the 13th century. Next, to the mosque, there used to be an Islamic court (Makhama) and an Islamic university of considerable fame.

=== Abdallah Ibn Salam Mosque ===
Abdallah Ibn Salam Mosque is a mosque in Algeria. Formerly the Great Synagogue of Oran (in Arabic: معبد وهران العظيم), it was built in 1880 at the initiative of Simon Kanoui, but its inauguration took place only in 1918. Also known as Temple Israelite, it is located on the former Boulevard Joffre, currently Boulevard Maata Mohamed El Habib. It was one of the largest synagogues in North Africa.

Once Algeria gained its independence in 1962, almost all Jewish settlers had returned to France. An estimated 100 to 120 thousand Jewish settlers, as well as a million other European settlers and 100 thousand Muslim Harkis, had fled Algeria choosing to settle in France during the Pied-Noir exodus.

The Jewish settlers relocating to France in the 1960s were assigned "repatriate" status and classed alongside the European settler population because the Jews of Algeria had been French citizens since the Crémieux Decree of 1870.

The Abdallah Ibn Salam mosque is named after the 7th-century Jew from Medina who converted to Islam.

== Cultural tourism ==
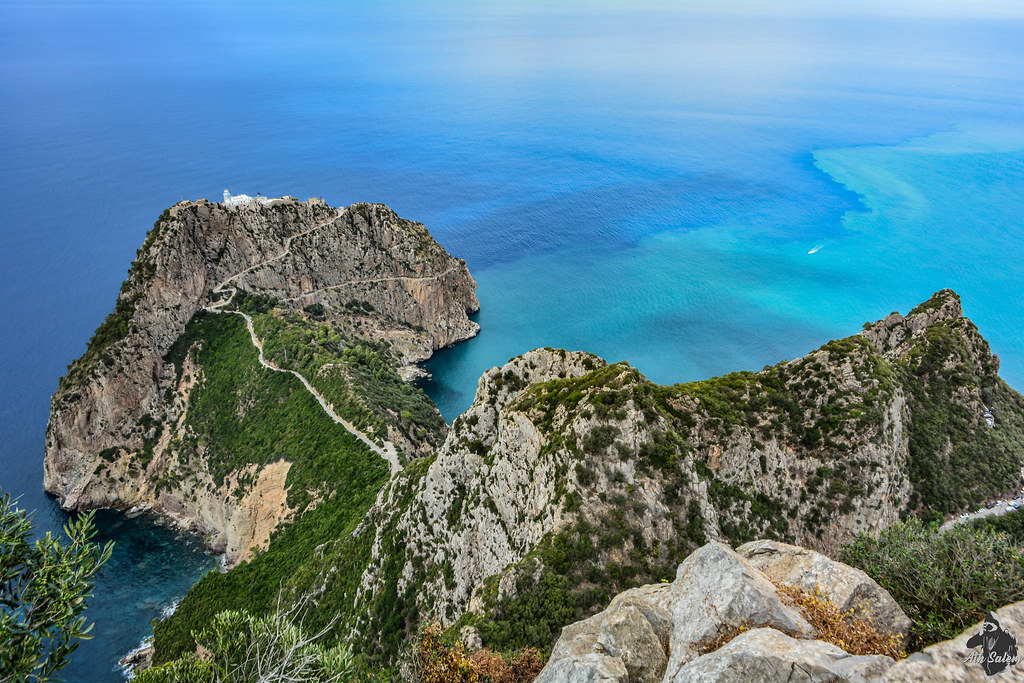
Cap carbon "paradise cape", Bejaia

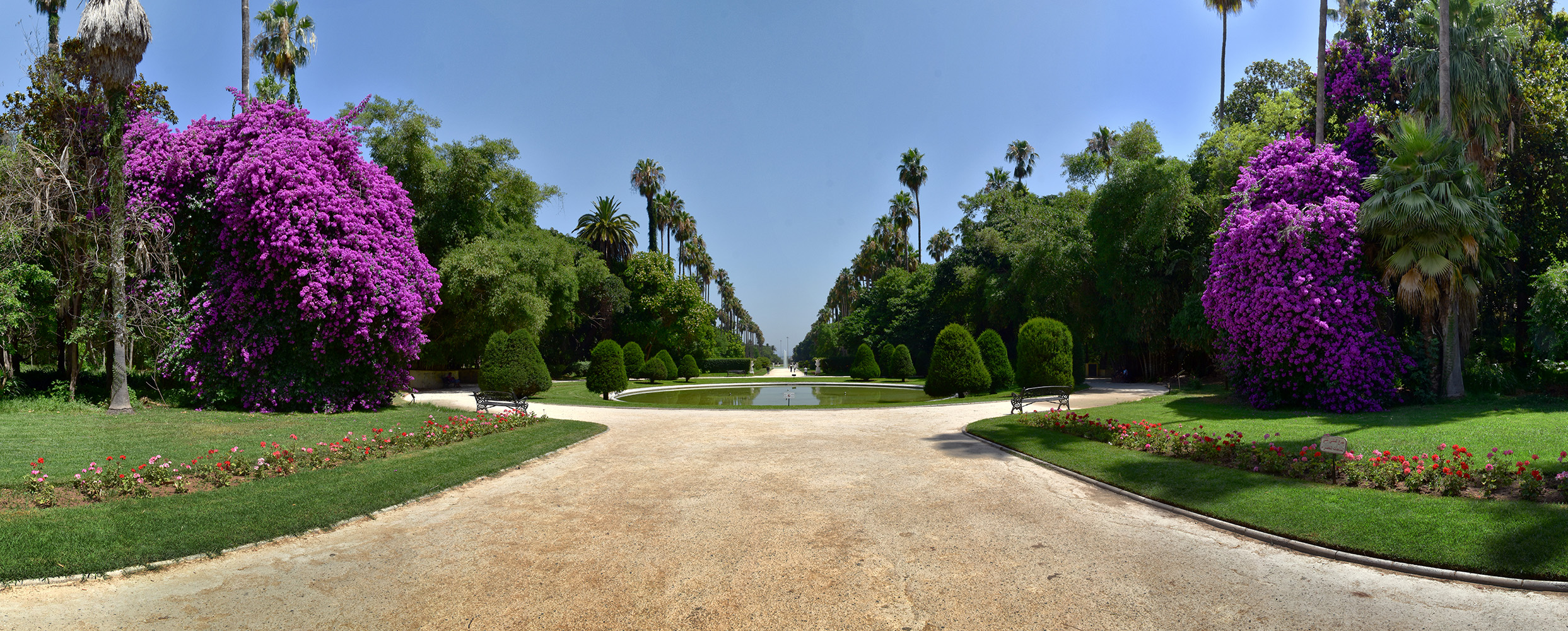
Botanical Garden Hamma is a 58-hectare (140-acre) botanical garden (38 hectares (94 acres) of gardens and 20 hectares (49 acres) of arboretum) located in the Mohamed Belouizdad (formerly Hamma-Anassers) district of Algiers. It was established in 1832.

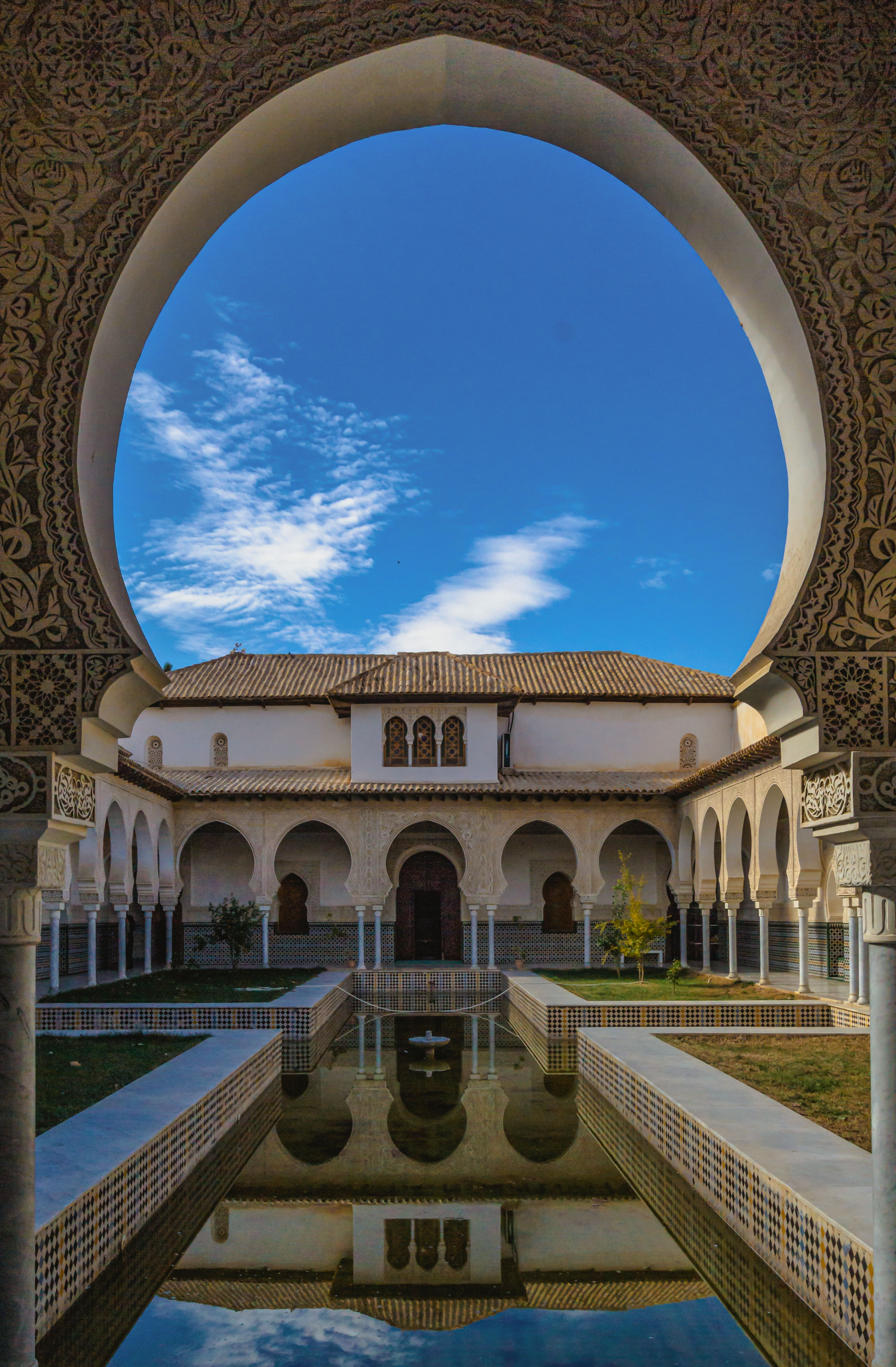
Mechouar Mosque

Architecturally, there are strong Berber, Arabic, Spanish and French influences following colonization, but also more contemporary works. The main post office in Algiers remains a monument of the neo-Moorish type, the work of Jules Voinot and Marius Toudoire. The Casbah of Algiers is also a place of visit classified as a world heritage of UNESCO since 1982.

=== Museums ===
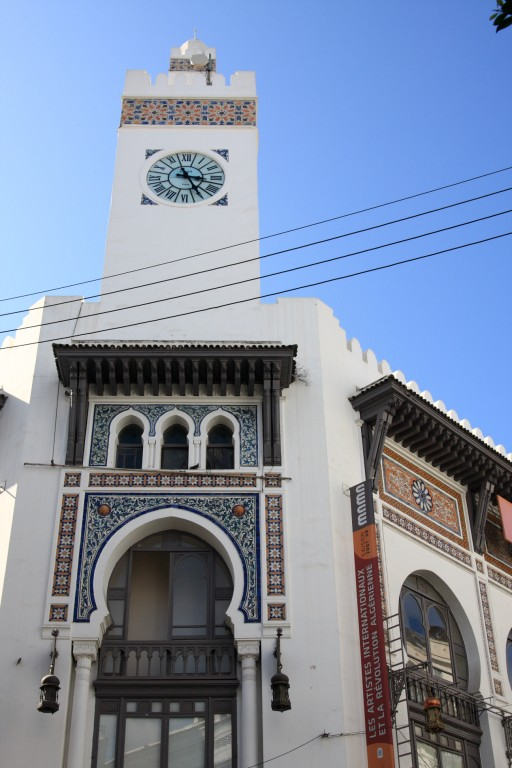
Museum of Modern Art of Algiers

- Ahmed Zabana National Museum
- Archaeological Museum of Cherchell
- Bardo National Museum of Prehistory and Ethnography
- Béni Abbès Museum
- Museum of Antiquities (Algiers)
- Museum of Modern Art of Algiers
- Museum of Popular Arts and Traditions
- Museum of the Revolution
- National Museum of Fine Arts of Algiers

=== Festivals ===
- International Arab Film Festival
- Timgad International Music Festival
- DimaJazz
- International Book Fair of Algiers
- Nuits de la Saoura
- International Cultural Festival of Algerian Symphonic Music
- Arab-African folk dance festival in Tizi Ouzou
- Algiers International Comics Festival

== Nature Tourism ==
Algeria benefits from important natural assets such as its beaches in general still in the wild, landscapes and zones like the Algerian Desert. There are 10 national parks in Algeria, including the Tassili Cultural Park (100,000 ha) or the Ahaggar Cultural Park (Hoggar) (380,000 ha)

Hiking enthusiasts have access to the vast mountains of Kabylia. Despite what is thought, Algeria also has a ski area in Tikjda as well as spas.

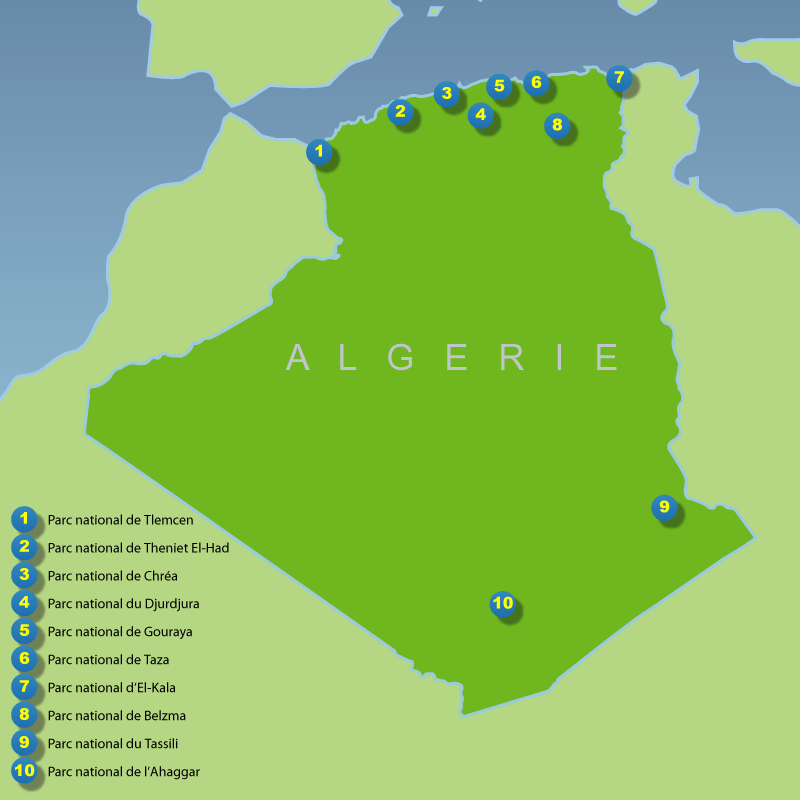
National parks of Algeria

=== National Parks ===
- Ahaggar National Park
- Belezma National Park
- Chrea National Park
- Djurdjura National Park
- El Kala National Park
- Gouraya National Park
- Tassili n'Ajjer National Park
- Taza National Park
- Theniet El Had National Park
- Tlemcen National Park

=== Algerian Desert ===
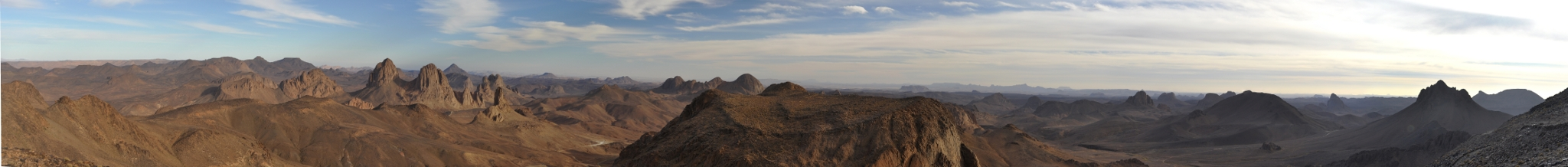
Panorama of The Hoggar Mountains

Saltwork formation in the shape of elephant in Illizi

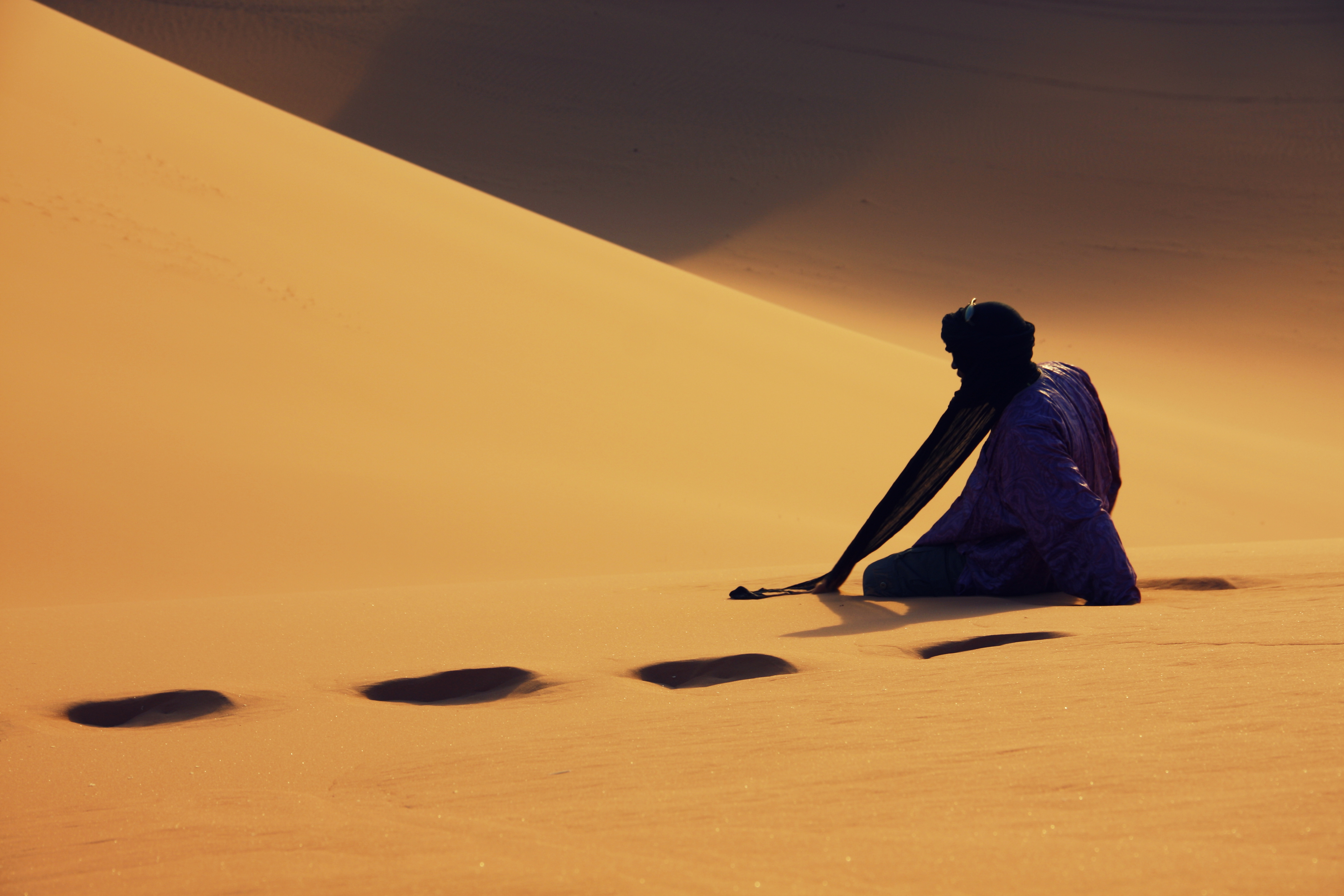
Tuareg on the dune of Timerzouga, place named Tadrart in the town of Djanet

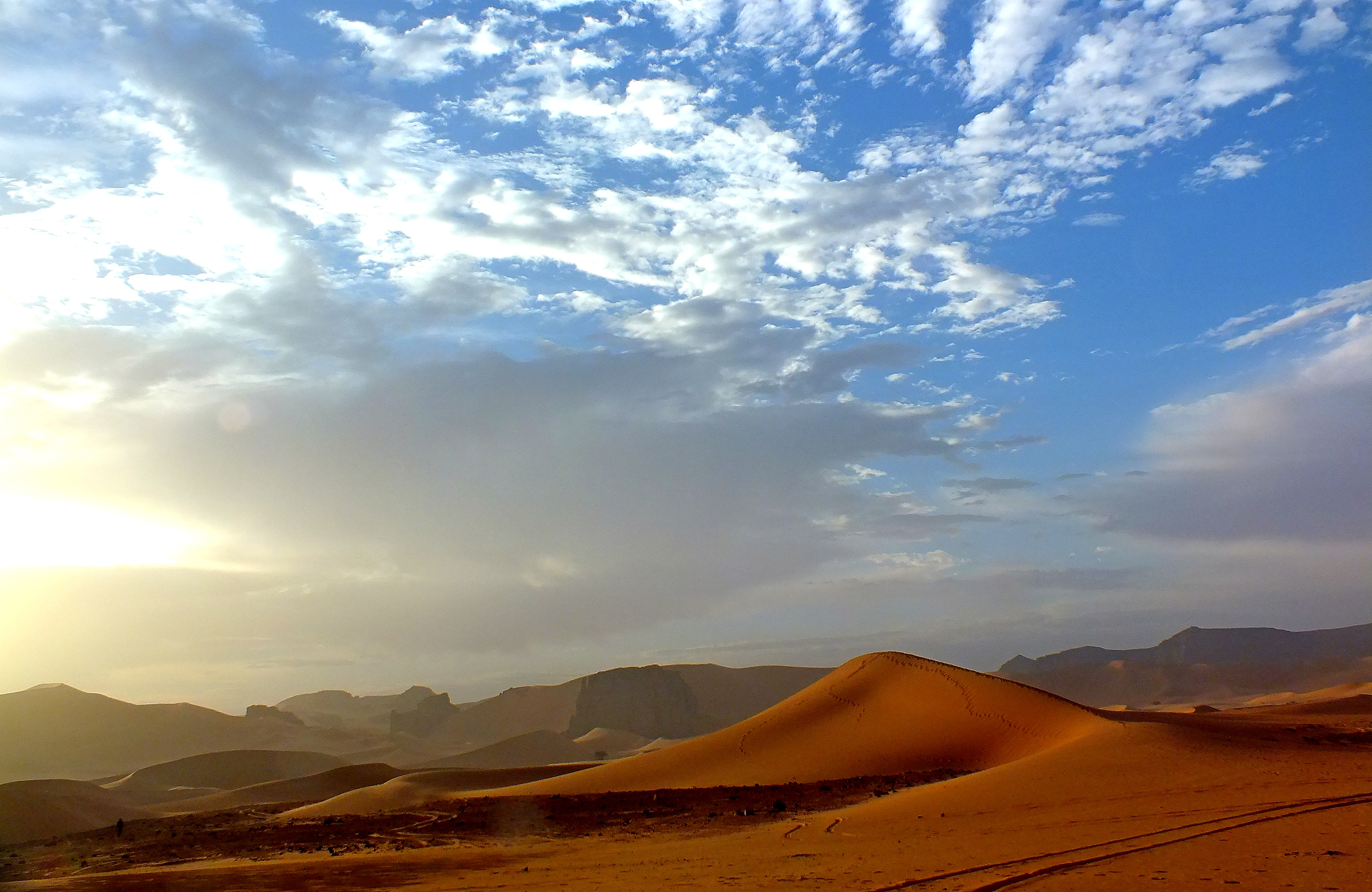
Culturel parc of Tassili

The Algerian Sahara is one of the most important tourist destinations in Algeria, the Great South is a flagship destination internationally. Hiking is not the only way to discover the Sahara, in fact, camel rides on a Meharée camel or in a 4x4 vehicle, or even formulas combining hiking, camel trekking, and 4x4.

The Algerian Desert is located in north-central Africa and is part of the Sahara Desert. The desert occupies more than four-fifths of the Algerian territory. Its expansion starts from the Saharan Atlas, more or less as a stony desert and the farther inland you get the more of a sand dune desert it becomes.

In the southwestern parts is the mountain range Tassili n'Ajjer located. This area is a subject of great archaeological interest and was put up on the "World Heritage List" by UNESCO in 1982. The area is known for extreme aridity and extreme heat, as daytime temperatures are commonly between 46 °C (113 °F) and 51 °C (122 °F) during the hottest period of the year in most of the desert.

Cities and towns such as Ouargla, Touggourt, Beni Abbes, Adrar, In Salah are among the hottest places on Earth during the height of summer. The annual average rainfall is well below 100 mm (3,93 in) in the northernmost part but the center and the southern part receive much less than 50 mm (1,96 in) and are therefore hyper-arid and among the driest places on Earth.

Among the unmissable places of the Sahara in quote:

- Tamanrasset
- Timimoun
- Djanet
- Ouargla
- Béchar

== Cuisine ==
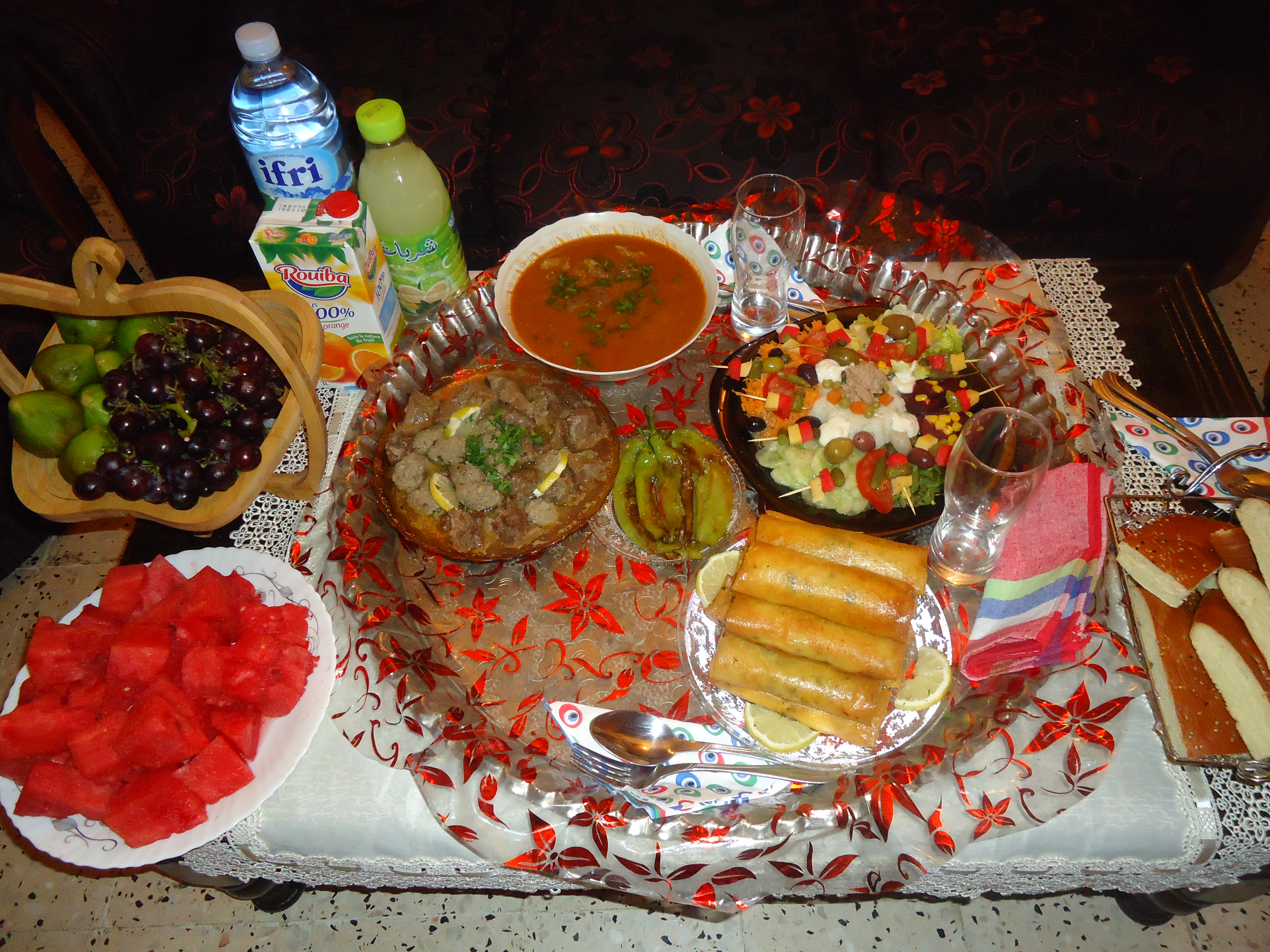
Ramadan breakfast (Ftour) table.

Cuisine of Algeria
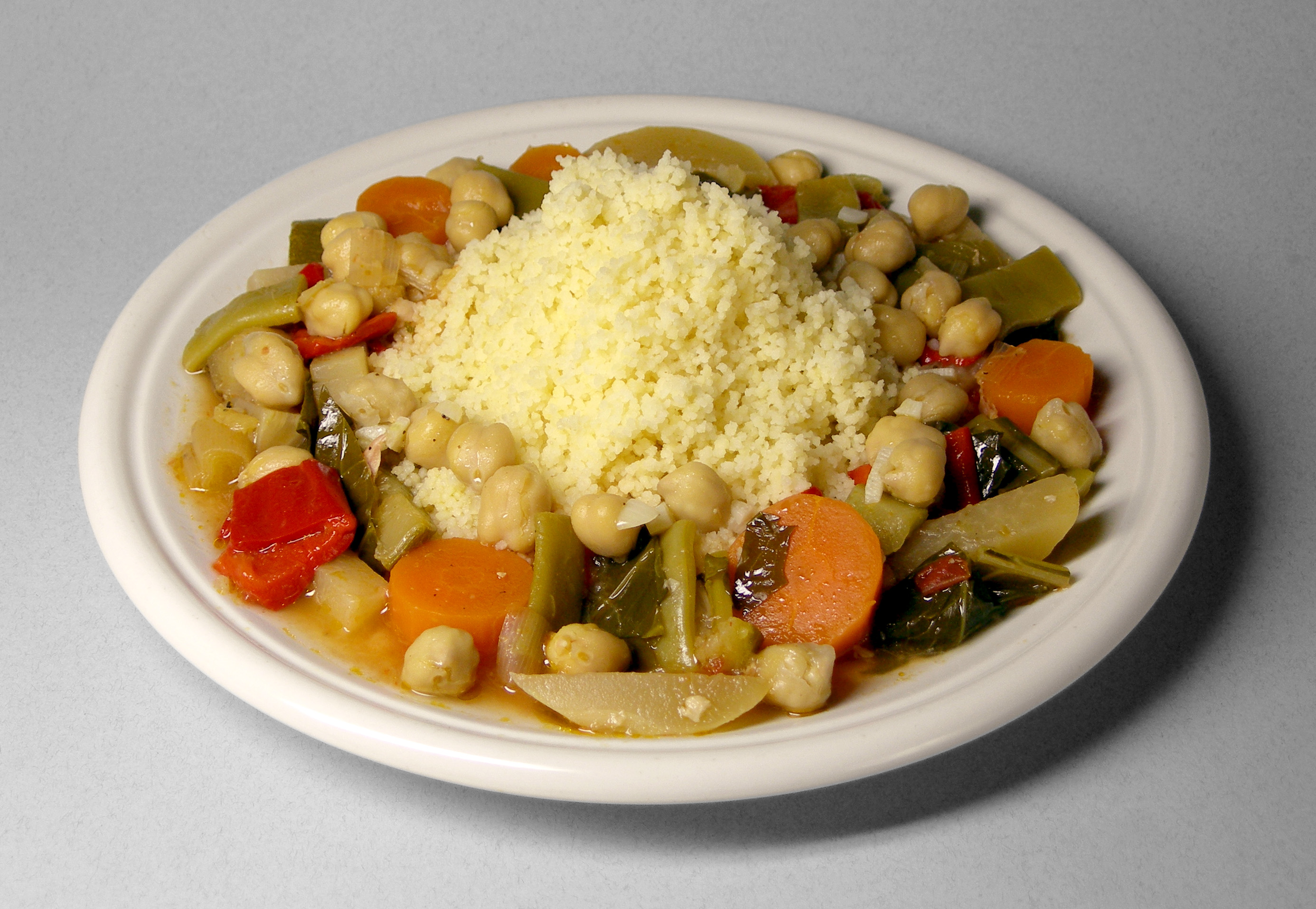
- Couscous with vegetables and chickpeas

Standard Arabic
- Abjad: المطبخ الجزائري
- Romanization: Al-Maṭbakh al-Jazā'irī

Algerian Arabic
- Abjad: الكوزينة تاع دزاير
- Latin: El Couzina ta3 Dzaïr

Tamazight
- Tifinagh: ⵜⴰⴽⵓⵣⵉⵏⵜ ⵏ ⴷⵣⴰⵢⴻⵔ
- Latin: Takuzint n Dzayer
- Abjad: ثاكوزينت ن زّاير

French
- French: Cuisine algérienne
- IPA: [kɥizin alʒeʁjɛn]

The cuisine of Algeria is a fusion of Andalusian, Berber, Mediterranean. It differs slightly from region to region. Every region has its own cuisine, including Kabylie, Algiers (couscous) and Constantine.

Algerian cuisine is influenced by various cultures such as Berber, Arabic, and French. Most of the Algerian dishes are centered around lamb or beef, olive oil, fresh vegetables, and fresh herbs. Traditionally, no Algerian meal is complete without bread, normally a long French baguette or more traditionally a flat semolina bread. Pork consumption is forbidden to devout Muslim inhabitants of Algeria in accordance with Sharia, religious laws of Islam.

Algeria, like other Maghreb countries, produces a large range of Mediterranean fruits and vegetables and even some tropical ones. Lamb is commonly consumed. Mediterranean seafood and fish are also eaten and produced by the little inshore fishing.

Algerians consume a high amount of meat, as it is found in almost every dish. Mutton is the most eaten meat in the country. Poultry and beef are also eaten Other uncommon types of meat such as game, birds, and venison are considered a delicacy. Wild boar is also hunted and eaten. While pork is not available in stores, it can only be bought from hunters directly.

Vegetables that are commonly used include potatoes (batata/betetè), carrots (zrodiya), onions (bsel), tomatoes (tomatish/tømètish), zucchini (corget/qar'a), garlic (ethom), cabbages (cromb), and eggplant (badenjan). Olives (zéton) are also used. Vegetables are often used in stews (jwaz/djwizza) and soups (chorba) or simply fried or boiled.

The Kesra, traditional Algerian flatbread, is the base of Algerian cuisine and eaten at many meals. A popular Algerian meal is merguez, an originally Berber sausage.

A common and one of the most popular dishes of Algerian cuisine is couscous, with other common dishes include shakshouka, Karantita, marqa bel a'assel, a speciality from Tlemcen, and chakhchoukha. Spices used in Algerian cuisine are dried red chillies of different kinds, caraway, Arabian ras el hanout, black pepper and cumin, among others.

Algerians also use tagines, handmade in Algeria. Algerian food is often cooked in clay vessels, much like Maghrib cuisine. Algerian cuisine represents the region north of the Sahara desert and west of the Nile. Algerian chefs take a lot of pride in cooking skills and methods and their many secrets lie in the variety of ways they mix special spices.

There are many different types of Algerian salads, influenced by French and Turkish cuisine, which may include beetroot or anchovies. There are also dishes of Spanish origin in Algeria, like the Gaspacho Oranais, an Algerian version of a Manchego dish.

== Climate ==
Northern Algeria is in the temperate zone and has a mild, Mediterranean climate. It lies within approximately the same latitudes as southern California and has somewhat similar climatic conditions. Its broken topography, however, provides sharp local contrasts in both prevailing temperatures and incidence of rainfall. Year-to-year variations in climatic conditions are also common. This area, the most inhabited in Algeria, is commonly referred to as the Tell.

== Transportation ==
As the tenth-largest country in the world, and the largest in Africa and in the Mediterranean region, Algeria has a vast transportation system which includes many transportation infrastructures.

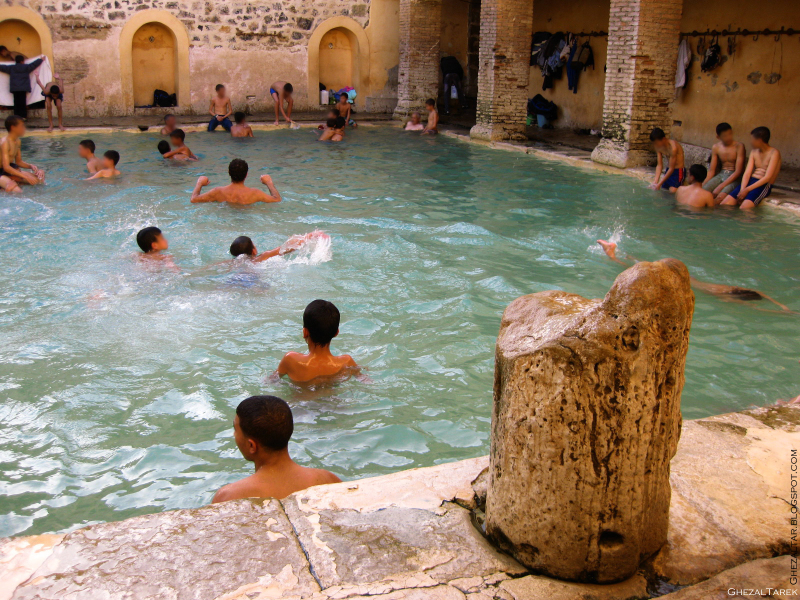
The rectangular pool of the Hammam Essalihine in Khenchela.

== See also ==
- Tourism in Africa
- Visa policy of Algeria
- Economy of Algeria
- Museums in Algeria
- Boudouaou Valley
