= Tromborn =

- Commune
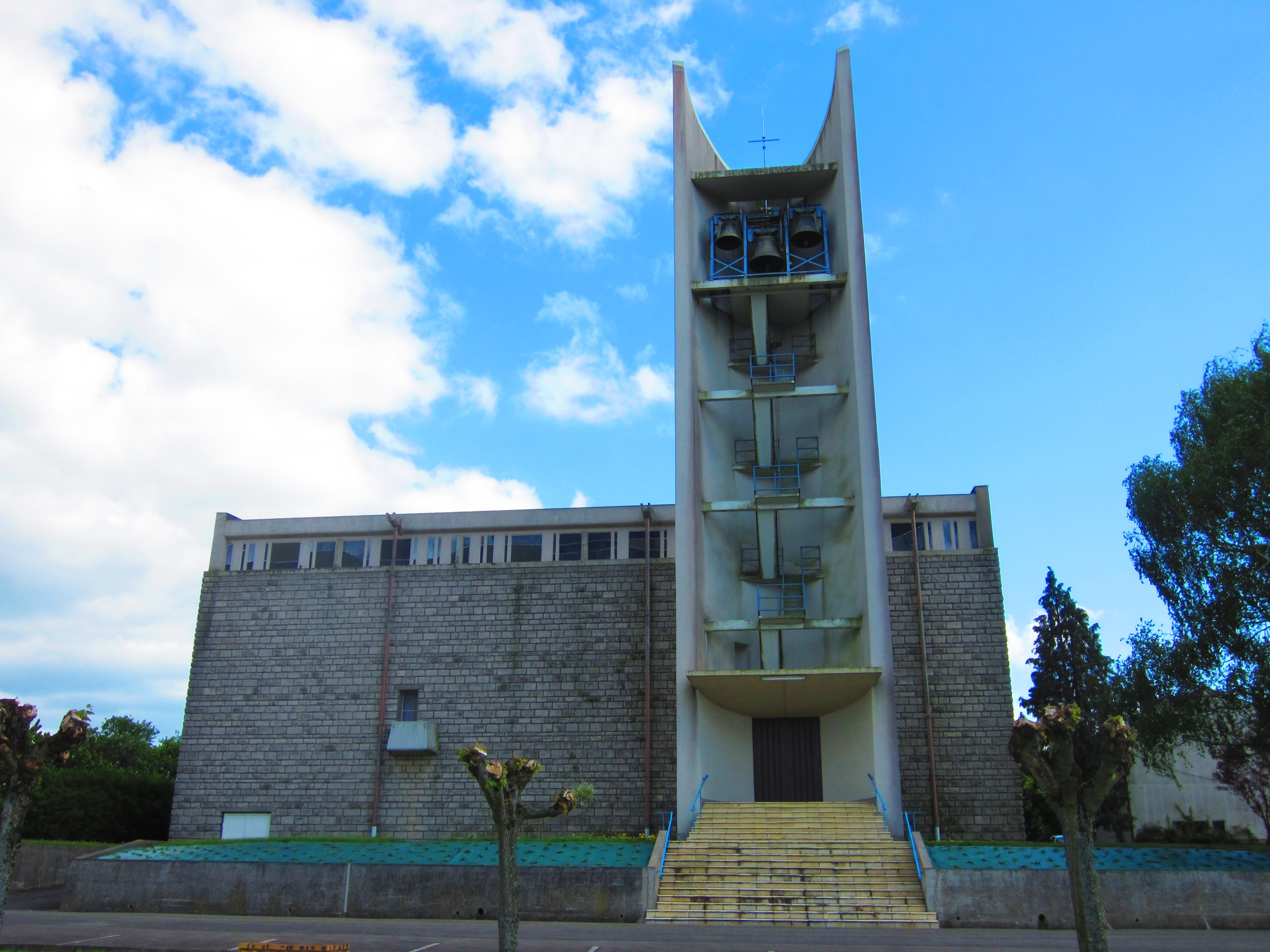
- Tromborn, church of Saint-Martin.

- Coat of arms
- Location of Tromborn
- Location within France Location within Grand Est
- Coordinates: 49°15′30″N 6°35′18″E
- Country: France
- Region: Grand Est
- Department: Moselle
- Arrondissement: Forbach-Boulay-Moselle
- Canton: Bouzonville

Government
  - Mayor (2020–2026): Gabriel Armand Contelly
- Area^{1}: 6.13 km^{2} (2.37 sq mi)
- Population (2023): 339
  - Density: 55.3/km^{2} (143/sq mi)
- Time zone: UTC+01:00 (CET)
  - Summer (DST): UTC+02:00 (CEST)
- INSEE/Postal code: 57681 /57320
- ^{1} French Land Register data, which excludes lakes, ponds, glaciers > 1 km^{2} (0.386 sq mi or 247 acres) and river estuaries.

Tromborn (French pronunciation: [tʁɔ̃bɔʁn]) is a commune in the Moselle department in Grand Est in north-eastern France.

== Geography ==
Tromborn is a rural village located at the center of the triangle formed by the towns of Bouzonville, Boulay and Creutzwald. The commune is located 3 km from the German border. Tromborn is 32 km from Metz, 6 km from Saarlouis and 11 km from Boulay.

An orientation table provides an overview of the valley of the Nied where footpaths are also listed on a map. From this overview, it's possible to see Luxembourg and Malbrouck Castle, located more than 30 km away, just with binoculars. The Vosges Mountains, located about 100 km away, can be observed in clear weather with a hand-held telescope or telephoto lens.

Near the village:

- Téterchen wind farms were the first wind farms in the north east of France;
- At 3 km, the Lorraine House of Oberdorff with the Museum of Popular Arts and Traditions;
- At 11 km, Teufelsburg castle built by John I, Duke of Lorraine in 1360 in Felsberg, Germany;
- At 27 km, the Völklingen Ironworks (Germany) registered in the UNESCO World Heritage since 1994.

Visual landscape cues:

- Téterchen wind turbines, with a maximum height of 127 meters rising to 500 meters;
- A steel tower with a height of 76 meters used by Électricité de France, Orange, SFR and TDF to make radio transmissions rises to 456 meters;
- The steeple of the Saint-Martin church with an approximate height of 30 meters in the village center, rises to 380 meters.

=== Climate ===
Tromborn has an oceanic climate with temperate summers (Cfb in the Köppen climate classification). Given its position on a plateau, the village is constantly swept by winds. Tempestuous winds are exceptional but sometimes cause damage to roofs and trees, average wind speed is 20 km/h.

=== Agriculture ===
Agriculture in the village grew into a landscape of open fields. Two-thirds of the surface of Tromborn (about 4 hectares) are agricultural land. There is intensive production of wheat, barley and maize and industrial crops such as rapeseed. Today there are still some meadows, some of which are used for breeding sheep and cows.

=== Forests ===
The forest area extends over a quarter of the area of the village, a total of around 1.5 hectares. Note the presence of beech, of spruce, of oak, of charm and coppicing.

=== Wildlife ===
A number of rare bird species are found in the region, such as the corncrake, the Eurasian hobby, the curlew and the common grasshopper warbler. Other species have been seen, such as the red kite, the blue tit, the buzzard, the pheasant, the marbled white butterfly, the kestrel and the wagtail. The forest area of the village is inhabited by the common species to the region such as wild boar, deer and fox.

=== Transport ===
The village is located at kilometer 32 of the departmental route 954 which extends from west to east of Metz (km 0) to Saarlouis (38 km), passing through Boulay-Moselle (km 21). Roads run from Dalem, Rémering, Villing, Oberdorff, Brettnach and Téterchen to the village.

Tromborn lacks its own railway station, the closest are those of Bouzonville 7 km away, Saint-Avold 27 kilometres (17 mi) away and Metz 35 km (22 mi) away.

The nearest access to the French motorway network is 16 km (10 mi) away at Boulay-Moselle on the A4.

Access to the German motorway network located 8 km (5 mi) from the village is through the exchange of Saarlouis in the direction of Luxembourg, Saarbrücken, Trier and Mannheim.

The closest civilian airports are those of Metz-Nancy-Lorraine 60 km (37 mi) away, Luxembourg 82 km (51 mi) away and Strasbourg 172 km (107 mi) away.

Tromborn's postal code is 57320, which is the post office number of Bouzonville.

== Demography ==
The 1872 census indicates a population decline in the town. Tromborn is a cereal village, the agricultural crisis of the 1890s and the 1914-1918 war accentuated the rural exodus.

The town is too far from the new industrial centers of the 20th century, many workers and small landowners permanently abandoned their native villages for the cities.

Historical population

Year	Pop.	±% p.a.
1800	368	—
1821	429	+0.73%
1836	515	+1.23%
1861	507	−0.06%
1875	449	−0.86%
1900	366	−0.81%
1926	413	+0.47%
1936	364	−1.25%
1946	117	−10.73%
1954	259	+10.44%

Year	Pop.	±% p.a.
1968	280	+0.56%
1975	268	−0.62%
1982	306	+1.91%
1990	288	−0.75%
1999	296	+0.30%
2007	330	+1.37%
2012	363	+1.92%
2017	357	−0.33%
2023	339	−0.86%

Source: EHESS and INSEE

Historical decline between 1936 and 1946 is due to the total destruction of the village at the beginning of the Second World War.

== Local culture and heritage ==
=== Religious buildings ===
The Church of St. Martin has avant-garde architecture designed by architects Roger Fraisse and Madeline Felix 71 years ago. Its construction was completed in 1955 and renovations were made at the beginning of the 21st century.

A bell dating from 1695 was once located on the steeple of the church of St. Martin. It is still used today on the ground in the straight extension of the nave inside the building. Its presence since 331 years contributes to Tromborn's heritage.

At the beginning of the 21st century, a chapel was built inside the village cemetery.

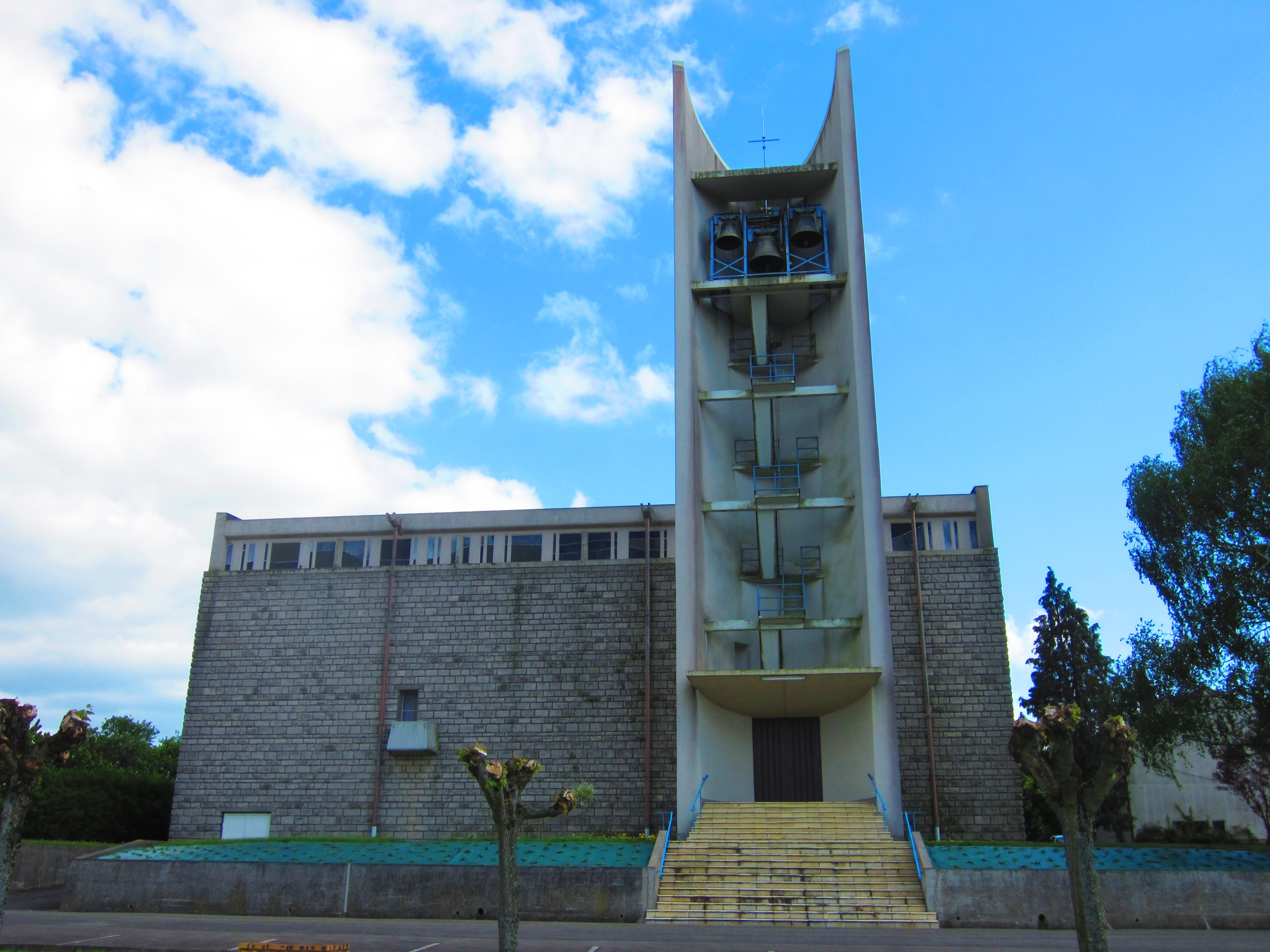
The church of Saint-Martin.

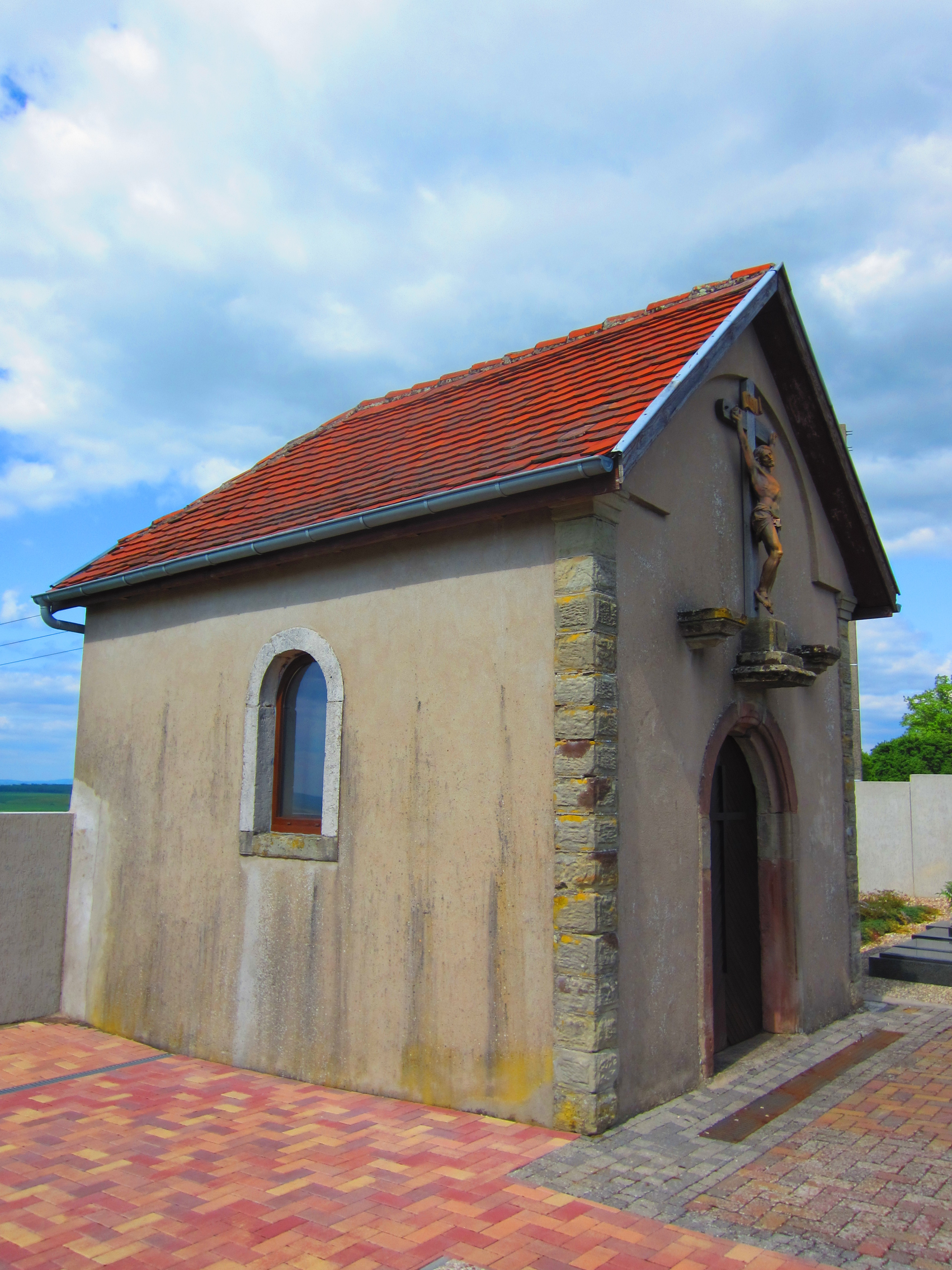
The cemetery chapel

== See also ==
- Communes of the Moselle department
