= Museum of the Revolution =

Museum of the Revolution may refer to:

- Museum of the Revolution (Algeria)
- Museum of the Revolution (Cuba)
- Museum of the Revolution (El Salvador)
- Museum of the American Revolution in Philadelphia, Pennsylvania, United States
