= At the Bardo =

At the Bardo may refer to:

- Near-East museums:
  - Bardo National Museum (Tunis), in suburbs of Le Bardo, Tunisia
  - The Bardo National Museum of Prehistory and Ethnography, former palace a.k.a. Bardo National Museum (Algiers)
- "Lincoln at the Bardo", recurring misnomer for Lincoln in the Bardo, 2017 experimental novel referring to Tibetan Buddhist afterlife
