= Musée national des Arts et Traditions Populaires =

Musée national des Arts et Traditions Populaires may refer to:

- Musée national des Arts et Traditions Populaires (Algeria)
- Musée national des Arts et Traditions Populaires (France)
