= Museum of Modern Art of Algiers =

Art museum in Algeria

Coordinates: 36.7667°N 3.0500°E

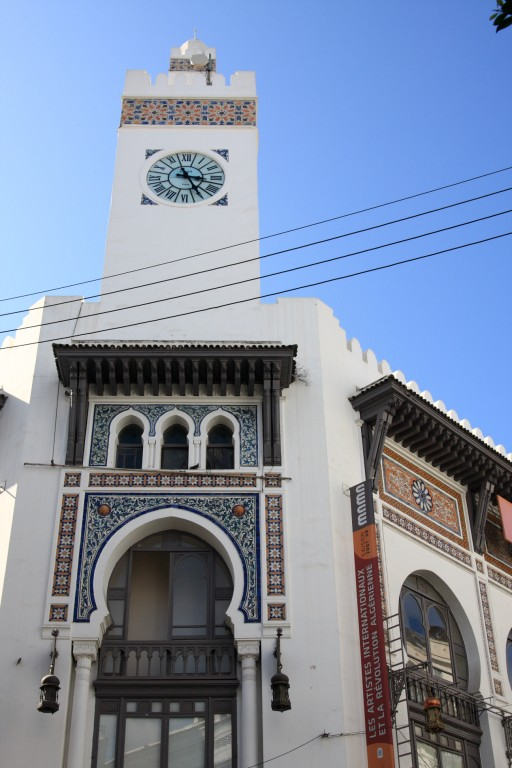
- Location: Algiers, Algeria
- Curators: Mohamed Djehiche (2007), art historian

The Museum of Modern Art of Algiers (MaMa) is an art museum in Algiers. It was inaugurated in 2007.

== History ==
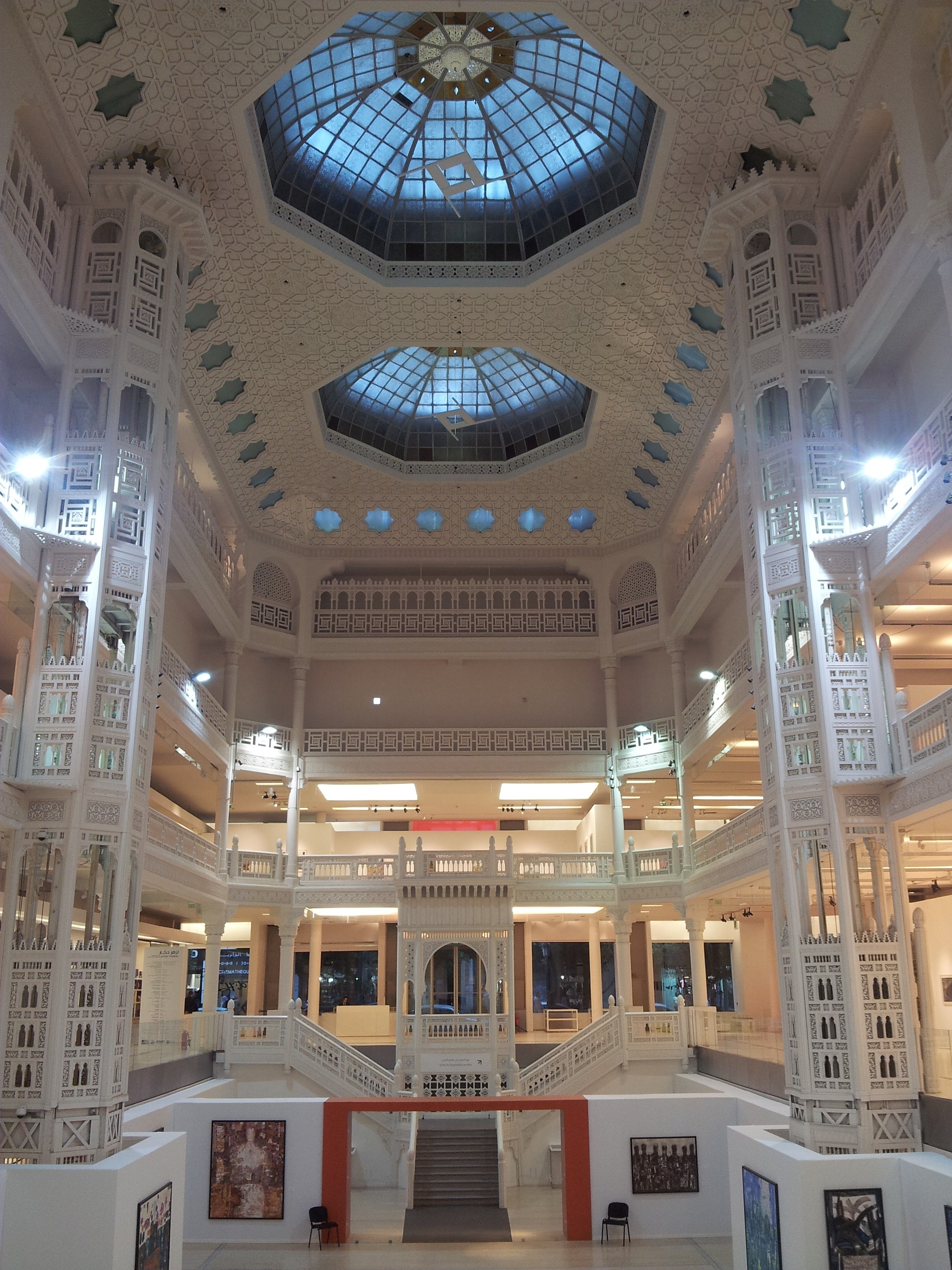
Interior of the museum in 2012

The building, built between 1901 and 1909, was first used as a department store, the Galeries de France. Its architecture is neo-moorish. It was rehabilitated to host the museum on five levels.

The MaMa was opened on the occasion of the operation "Algiers, capital of the Arabic culture 2007". It was supported by the ministry of Culture, Khalida Toumi. The museum is located at the number 25 of the street Larbi Ben M'hidi (formerly rue d'Isly).

== Curators ==
The current curator is Mohamed Djehiche, an art historian.

== Exhibitions ==
The MaMa presented a retrospective on Olivier Debré (May–August 2010) and a tribute to M'hamed Issiakhem (December 2010 – January 2011).

A retrospective of the life and work of Ahmed Malek, organized by the German record label Habibi Funk and co-curated by Sadaf Vasaei, was held between June 22, 2019 and July 31, 2019.

== See also ==
- List of museums in Algeria
