= Oberdorff =

- Commune
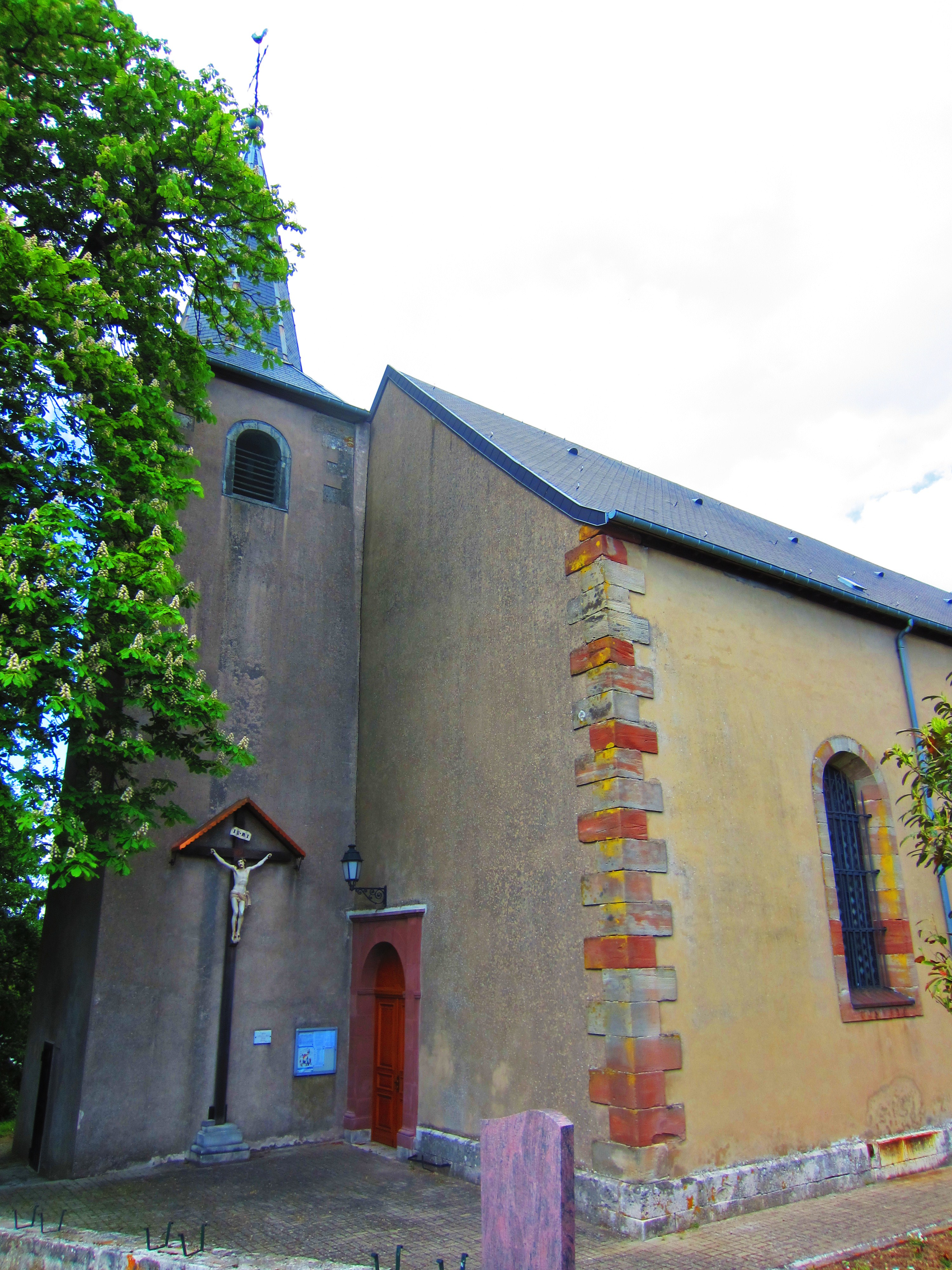
- Saint-Martin church at Odenhoven

- Coat of arms
- Location of Oberdorff
- Location within France Location within Grand Est
- Coordinates: 49°16′29″N 6°35′44″E
- Country: France
- Region: Grand Est
- Department: Moselle
- Arrondissement: Forbach-Boulay-Moselle
- Canton: Bouzonville
- Intercommunality: Houve-Pays Boulageois

Government
  - Mayor (2020–2026): Guy Hesse
- Area^{1}: 4.22 km^{2} (1.63 sq mi)
- Elevation: 300 m (980 ft)
- Highest elevation: 340 m (1,120 ft)
- Lowest elevation: 263 m (863 ft)
- Population (2023): 329
  - Density: 78.0/km^{2} (202/sq mi)
- Time zone: UTC+01:00 (CET)
  - Summer (DST): UTC+02:00 (CEST)
- INSEE/Postal code: 57516 /57320
- ^{1} French Land Register data, which excludes lakes, ponds, glaciers > 1 km^{2} (0.386 sq mi or 247 acres) and river estuaries.

Oberdorff (German: Oberdorf) is a commune in the Moselle department in Grand Est in north-eastern France.

The locality of Odenhoven is included in the commune.

== Population ==
Historical population
Year	Pop.	±% p.a.
1968	314	—
1975	302	−0.56%
1982	306	+0.19%
1990	314	+0.32%
1999	372	+1.90%
2007	364	−0.27%
2012	357	−0.39%
2017	343	−0.80%
2023	329	−0.69%
Source: INSEE

== See also ==
- Communes of the Moselle department
