= Museum of the Revolution (Algeria) =

Algerian war memorabilia museum

The Museum of the Revolution
- Established: 1968
- Location: Algeria
- Collections: displays a collection of memorabilia from Algeria's war of independence against France.

The Museum of the Revolution is a museum located in Algeria. The Museum displays a collection of memorabilia from Algeria's war of independence against France. It was established in 1968. The building was originally a village church.

== See also ==
- List of museums in Algeria
