= Sal Lavallo =

American traveller (born 1990)

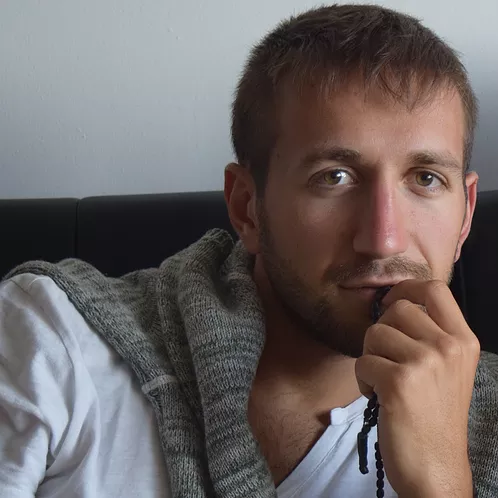
- Born: September 11, 1990 (age 35)
- Occupation: traveler
- Website: Official site

Sal Lavallo (born September 11, 1990) is an American traveller. He is one of the youngest people to have visited every country.

Lavallo was born in Indiana. After graduating from university, Lavallo worked for 3 years as a management consultant with McKinsey and Company in the Middle East and Africa. He has been based in Abu Dhabi, UAE since January 2012. Lavallo converted to Islam in 2013 in the village of Mang'ula, Tanzania, where he owns a small farm.

By the age of 24, Lavallo had visited over 100 countries while working and studying full time. He then took two years off work to travel full time, and just after his 27th birthday, he visited his final country, Malta, becoming one of the youngest people to have visited every country.
