= National Museum of Antiquities and Islamic Art =

Art museum in Algiers, Algeria

- Algerian National Museum of Antiquities and Islamic Art
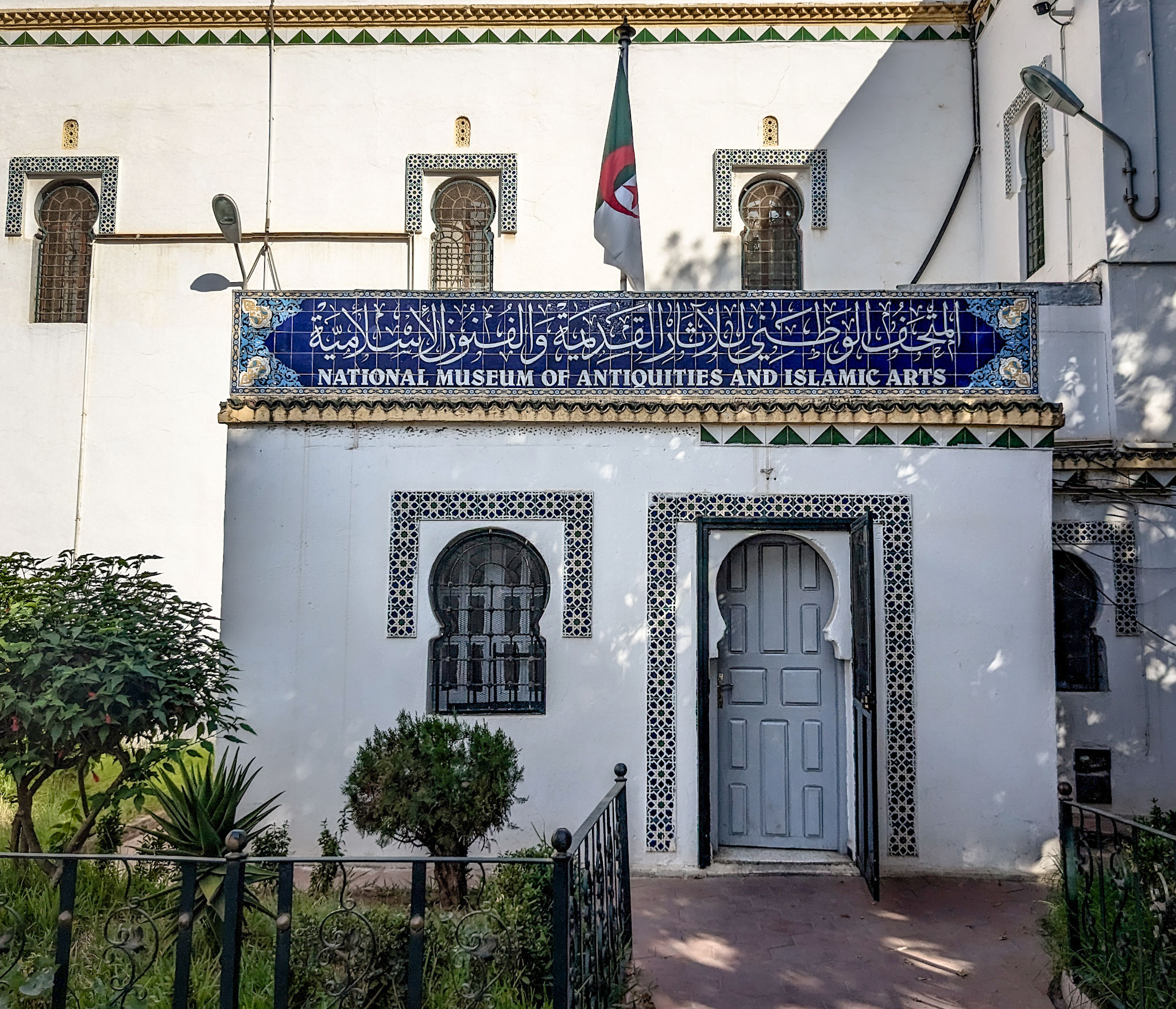
- Museum of Antiquities, c. 1899
- Established: 1897
- Location: Algiers, Algeria
- Coordinates: 36°45′41″N 3°2′46″E
- Type: art museum

The National Museum of Antiquities and Islamic Art (French: Musée National des Antiquités et des Arts Islamiques) is an art museum in Algiers, Algeria.

== History ==
According to Museum with No Frontiers, the National Museum of Antiquities and Islamic Art is the oldest museum in Algeria and Africa. The collection was set up in 1835 by Bertrand Clauzel and curated by Louis-Adrien Berbrugger. The early museum opened in 1838 with antiquities of Algerian provenance. Up until 1896, the museum had been moved to several locations, until it settled on the Mustapha Pasha hills and was officially inaugurated there in 1897.

The museum opened in 1897. In 1911, it was described as having "the finest collection of the kind in Algeria".

The branch of the museum that houses the Islamic collection was inaugurated in 2003. A reading room exhibiting a numismatic collection opened in 2006.

In March 2019, during the 2019–20 Algerian protests, the museum was looted. According to the Algerian ministry of culture, "criminals" used the agitation from the street protests to penetrate the museum, break and steal some of the pieces exhibited, start fires in the administration offices, and destroy registry documents. The same incident had almost happened a week before but the looters had been contained by the police. A few days later, the Algerian authorities announced that the artefacts stolen from the museum had been recovered (mainly swords and guns from the 1950s) and that the fire had actually taken place in an aisle that was under renovation.

== Description ==
The museum holds objects related to Algeria and Rome.

The museum is divided into two collections: Antiquity and Islamic.

== See also ==
- List of Islamic art museums
- List of museums in Algeria
