= 1st November of 1954 Great Mosque =

Mosque in Batna, Algeria

- المسجد الكبير 1 نوفمبر 1954
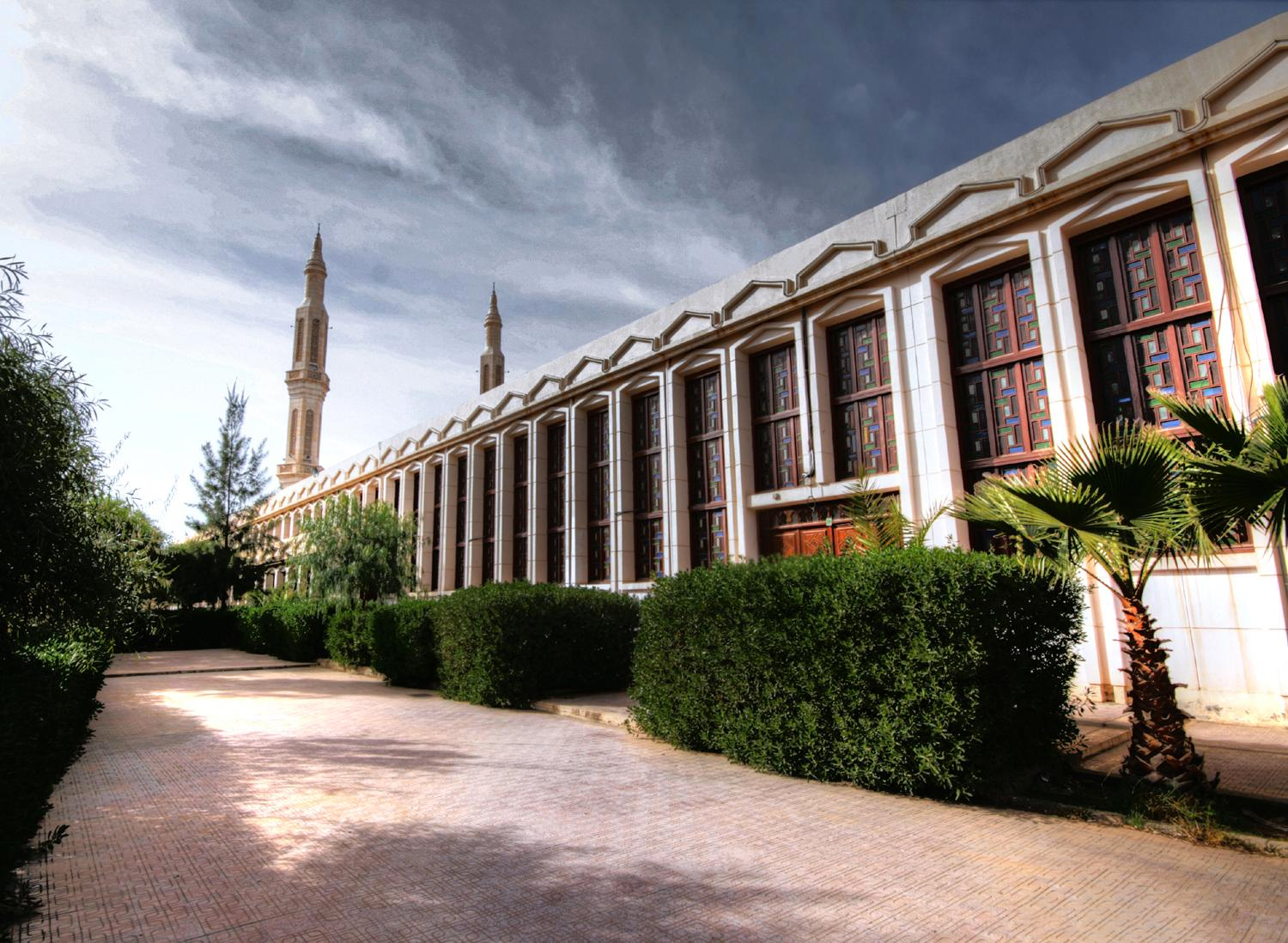
- The mosque in 2010

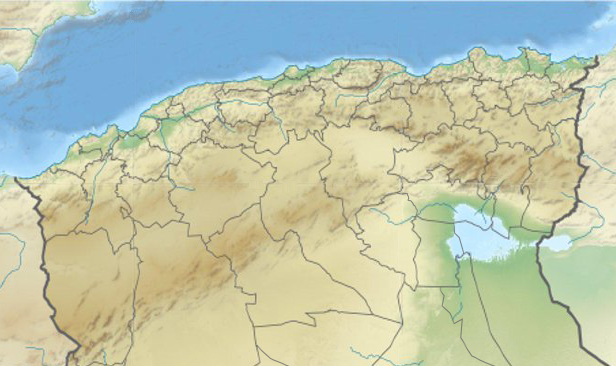
- Location of the mosque in north Algeria

Religion
- Affiliation: Sunni Islam
- Ecclesiastical or organizational status: Mosque
- Status: Active

Location
- Location: Batna, Aurès
- Country: Algeria
- Interactive map of 1st November of 1954; Great Mosque
- Coordinates: 35°19′28″N 6°06′00″E

Architecture
- Type: Islamic architecture

Specifications
- Capacity: 30,000 worshipers
- Interior area: 42,000 m^{2} (450,000 sq ft)
- Minaret: 2

The 1st November 1954 Great Mosque (Arabic: المسجد الكبير 1 نوفمبر 1954) is a Sunni mosque, located in the city of Batna, in the Aurès region of Algeria.

== Overview ==
The construction of the mosque began in 1980, and was completed in 2003. The mosque is located in the street bound to the city of Biskra. It has a area of 42,000 square metres (450,000 sq ft) with a maximum capacity of 30,000 worshipers.

== Gallery ==
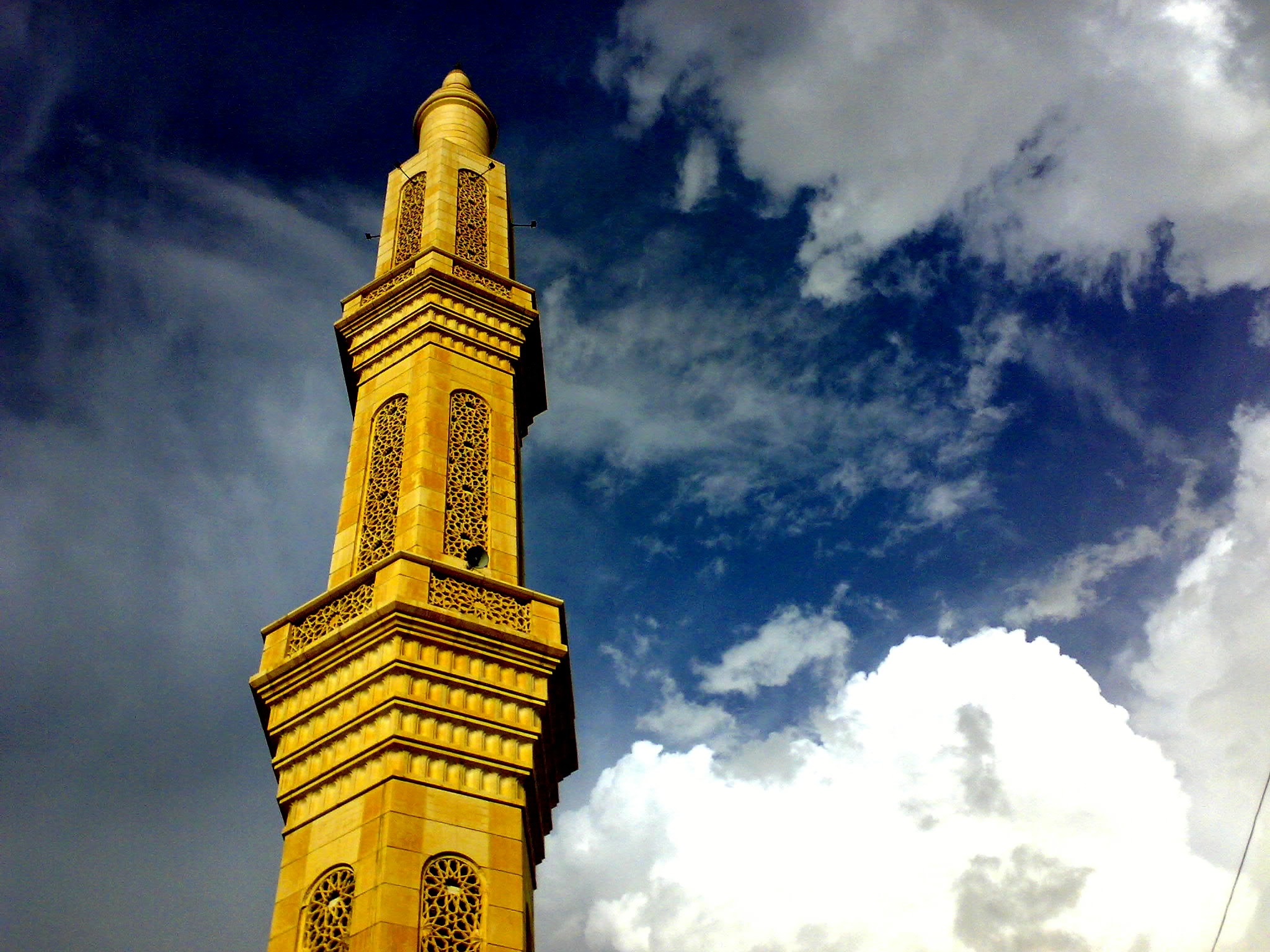
Minaret

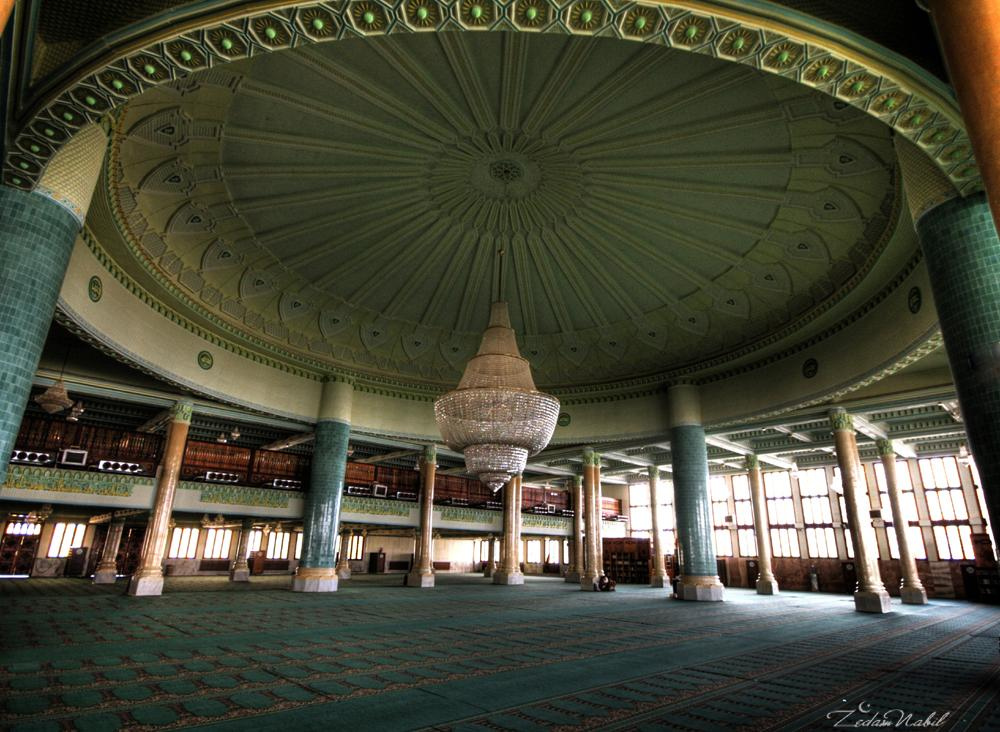
Prayer hall

== See also ==
- Islam in Algeria
- List of mosques in Algeria
