= Bardo National Museum (Algiers) =

National museum in Algeria

Coordinates: 36°45′37″N 3°02′47″E

Bardo National Museum of Prehistory and Ethnography
- المتحف الوطني باردو; Musée national du Bardo
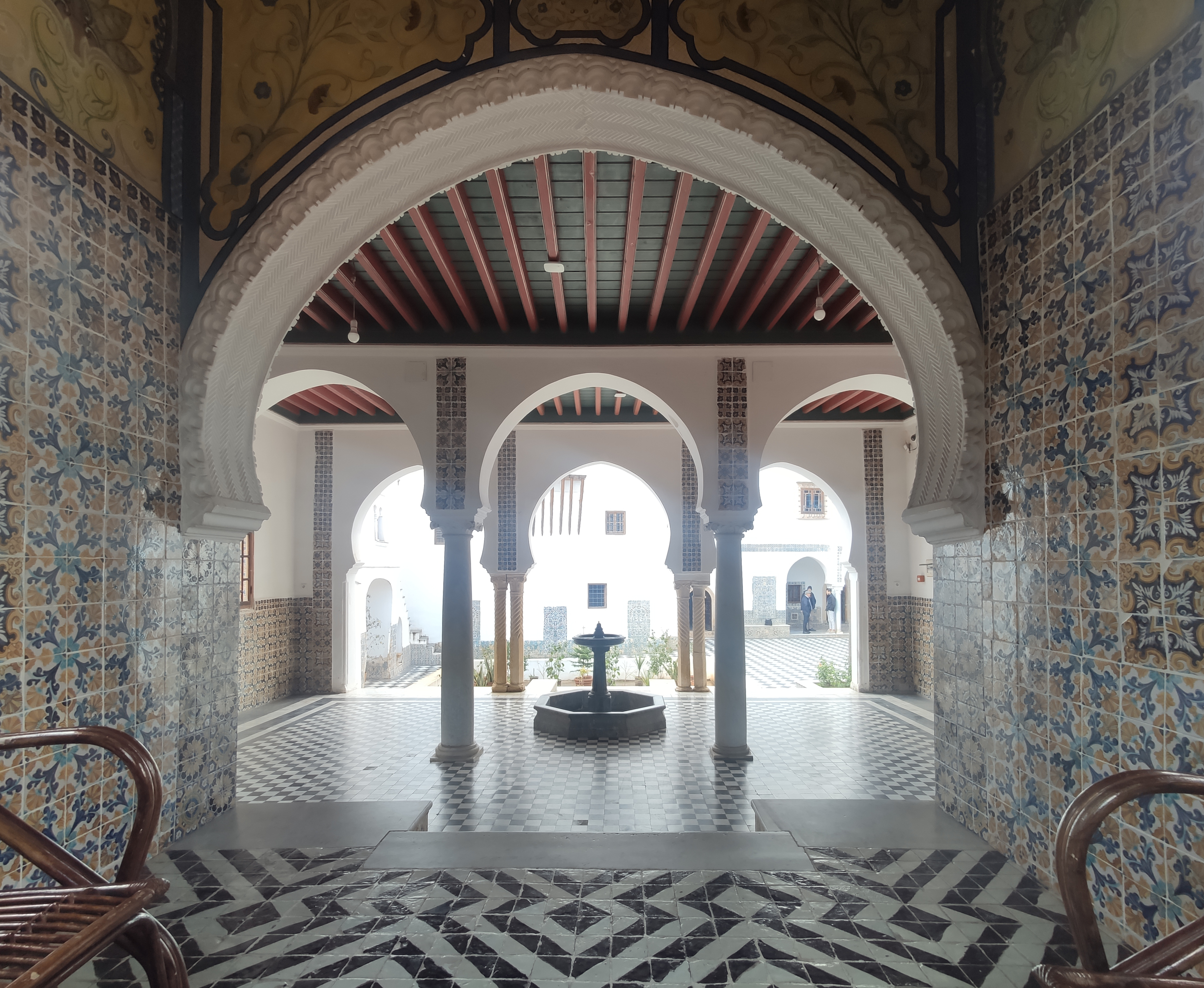
- The museum's court
- Former name: Bardo Museum
- Established: 1927
- Location: Algiers, Algeria
- Type: National museum
- Collection size: Tin Hinan Tomb miniature

The Bardo National Museum of Prehistory and Ethnography (Arabic: المتحف الوطني باردو), is a national museum located in Algiers, Algeria. It was originally a palace built by a wealthy exiled Tunisian, Hadj Mustapha ben Omar in the late 18th century.

The edifice is a former Moorish villa. It was opened as a museum in 1927.

Nothing specific is known about this residence, formerly in the countryside and now encompassed in the modern city. H. Klein tells us that the palace was built in the eighteenth century and that it would have been the property of Prince Omar before the French conquest. A document, in the form of a drawing signed by Captain Longuemare, specifies that it was Mustapha ben Omar who was a very rich Tunisian. In 1879, an extension was built by a Frenchman named Joret. In 1926, the Bardo Palace was ceded to the Domains by Mrs Frémont, sister and heiress of Pierre Joret.

== See also ==
- List of museums in Algeria
