= List of museums in Algeria =

This is a list of museums in Algeria organized by province

== List ==
=== Adrar Province ===
Museum	Class	Opened	Information	Photo	Coordinates	Ref
Mujahid Museum					27°52′22″N 0°17′06″W	

=== Algiers Province ===
Museum	Class	Opened	Information	Photo	Coordinates	Ref
National Museum of Moudjahid	National	1982				
Central Museum of the Algerian Army	National					
Bardo National Museum	National					
National Museum of Fine Arts of Algiers	National					
Museum of Popular Arts and Traditions	National		The palace houses a collection of Sufi relics, leather goods, silver, copper, and wooden items, sourced from various regions across Algeria.			
National Museum of Antiquities and Islamic Art	National	1838; officially inaugurated in 1897	Since 1838, the museum has been known by various names while retaining its primary function. (Note: Names include: The Museum of Algerian Antiquities, The Algerian Museum of Ancient Antiquities and Islamic Arts, The Stéphane Gsell Museum, named after one of the most renowned French archaeologists, and The National Museum of Antiquities. Ultimately, it was officially designated as The National Museum of Ancient Antiquities.)		36°45′41″N 3°02′46″E	
Museum of Modern Art of Algiers (MAMA)	National	2007	Dedicated to modern and contemporary art, the museum's mission is to showcase and promote contemporary Algerian art while preserving it, in addition to presenting international contemporary art through both permanent and temporary exhibitions that feature Algerian and international artworks.			
National Public Museum of Ornament, Miniature and Calligraphy	National	2007	Located within the Mustafa Pasha Palace, an historical archaeological site. It houses a collection of 267 artworks.			
Jidar Gallery	Art gallery	2024	Contemporary art gallery and creative space at 82 Rue Didouche Mourad, Alger Centre, hosting exhibitions, artist residencies, cultural events, and conversations.			

=== Batna Province ===
Museum	Class	Opened	Information	Photo	Coordinates	Ref
Moudjahid Museum						
Timgad Museum	National	1930	Located at the entrance of the ancient city of Timgad, often referred to as the "Pompeii of North Africa." The museum exhibits artifacts uncovered in Timgad, a city founded during the reign of Emperor Trajan, which was designated a UNESCO World Heritage Site in 1982. The museum also displays artifacts from other archaeological sites, including Tazoult (Lambaesis).			

=== Biskra Province ===
Museum	Class	Opened	Information	Photo	Coordinates	Ref
Regional Museum of the Mujahid						

=== Chlef Province ===
Museum	Class	Opened	Information	Photo	Coordinates	Ref
Abdelmadjid Meziane National Public Museum in Chlef	National				36°09′36″N 1°20′23″E	
Tennis Museum or Museum of Idols (House of Gunpowder)	Municipal	1847	The building was constructed in 1847, during the colonial period, under the orders of French General Cavignac. It was originally intended to store weapons and gunpowder for French military campaigns aimed at securing control over the Chlef Plain. The museum houses around 1,000 artefacts and remnants from various civilizations, including Phoenician, Carthaginian, Roman, Arab, Ottoman, and French cultures, each of which has influenced the region.		36°30′44″N 1°18′17″E	

=== Constantine Province ===
Museum	Class	Opened	Information	Photo	Coordinates	Ref
National Public Museum of Serta						

=== Djelfa Province ===
Museum	Class	Opened	Information	Photo	Coordinates	Ref
Museum of Anthropology and Traditional Art						

=== Ghardaïa Province ===
Museum	Class	Opened	Information	Photo	Coordinates	Ref
National Public Museum of Mena'a	National	1997	Specializes in prehistoric times and geological eras and features an ethnographic hall. Among its most significant exhibits are fossilized remains of dinosaur bones, including those of Diplodocus, Tyrannosaurus, and Pteranodon. Additionally, the museum showcases a skeleton of a Hippodame fish and the bones of an Elasmosaurus, along with various stone tools from different Stone Age periods that were utilized by humans in their daily lives.			

=== Khenchela Province ===
Museum	Class	Opened	Information	Photo	Coordinates	Ref
National Public Museum of the Boulaziz Brothers						

=== Laghouat Province ===
Museum	Class	Opened	Information	Photo	Coordinates	Ref
Municipal Museum (Old Church)			Serves as the Municipal Museum in the city of Laghouat. Formerly an old church, the Municipal Museum is one of the most important structures within the historic fortress of Laghouat.			

=== Oran Province ===
Museum	Class	Opened	Information	Photo	Coordinates	Ref
Ahmed Zabana National Museum		1935				

=== Ouargla Province ===
Museum	Class	Opened	Information	Photo	Coordinates	Ref
Saharawi Museum			Dedicated to the peoples and cultures of the Sahara. It serves as a repository for prehistoric artifacts, ethnographic collections, and handicrafts, and is classified as part of Algeria's national heritage.			

=== Oum El Bouaghi Province ===
Museum	Class	Opened	Information	Photo	Coordinates	Ref
Mujahid Museum						

=== Sétif Province ===
Museum	Class	Opened	Information	Photo	Coordinates	Ref
Musée Public National-Sétif		after 1993	The museum features four permanent exhibition halls, galleries for mosaics, a restoration laboratory, two artifact storage rooms, a specialized library, and an archaeological garden. It is housed in a modern architectural building that displays collections of artifacts discovered at sites classified as World and National Heritage, encompassing prehistoric times, ancient periods, and Islamic eras. The museum includes unique bone remains and stone tools discovered at one of the oldest sites of human civilization, world-renowned mosaic panels, and a collection of Islamic art from the Hammadi period.			
Bani Warthilan Museum		2018	Located in the municipality of Ben Werthilan, approximately 80 km (50 mi) north of Sétif. The museum covers an area of 1,650 m^{2} (17,800 sq ft) and includes a main entrance leading to a lobby, a main exhibition hall, a multi-purpose exhibition hall, conservation and documentation rooms, a 150-seat lecture hall, a VIP room and additional annexes and corridors.			
Jamila Site Museum		1910	Discovered during excavations conducted at the site from 1909 to 1957. Comprising four halls, the museum features mosaics displayed on its walls and floors, including the renowned "Mosaic of the Hunting Myth."			

=== Tébessa Province ===
Museum	Class	Opened	Information	Photo	Coordinates	Ref
National Public Museum of Tébessa	National					

=== Tipaza Province ===
Museum	Class	Opened	Information	Photo	Coordinates	Ref
National Public Museum of Tipaza		1955				

=== Tlemcen Province ===
Museum	Class	Opened	Information	Photo	Coordinates	Ref
National Public Museum of Islamic Archaeology						
National Public Museum of Islamic Calligraphy	National		A former mosque that contains artefacts of Almoravid and Zianid art, relics found during excavations at Siga, Honaïne and the Agadir mosque, as well as Almohad and Roman coins		34°52′59″N 1°18′41″W	

== See also ==
- List of museums
