= Museum of Popular Arts and Traditions =

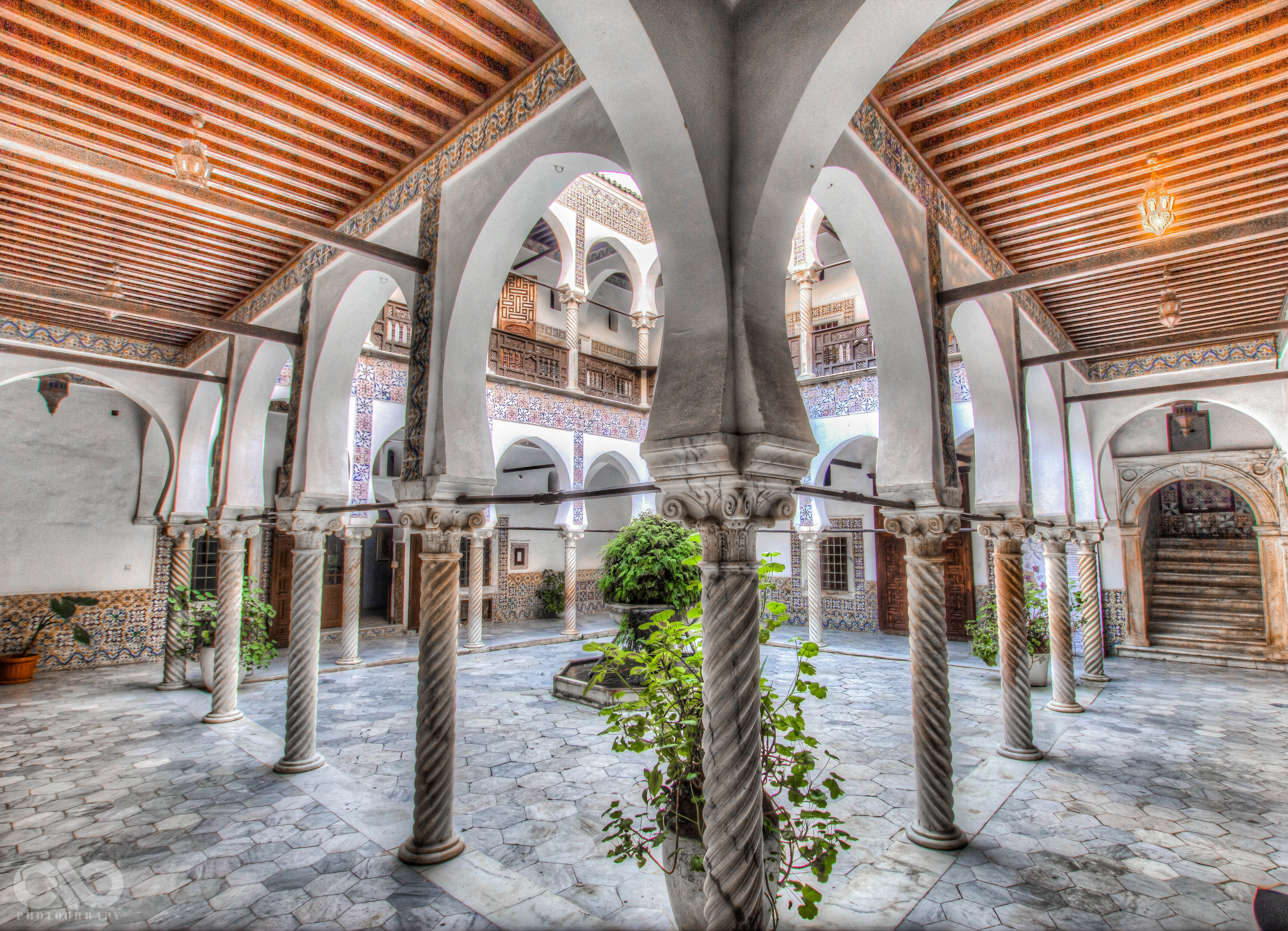
- Location: Algiers, Algeria
- Coordinates: 36°47′12″N 3°03′39″E
- Type: Art museum
- Collection size: Displays Algerian art, including rugs, jewellery, pottery and costumes

The Museum of Popular Arts and Traditions is an art museum in Algiers, the capital of Algeria. The museum is located on Rue Socgemah in the Souk El-Djemaâ of the Basse-Casbah district and welcomes around 47,000 visitors every year. Its displays Algerian art, including rugs, jewelry, pottery and costumes. The museum is housed in a former 16th-century Ottoman era palace. The former Turkish residence was formerly known as Dar Khadaoudj El Amia or Dar El Bekri. The museum contains a library, department of conservation, and Animation and Documentation Department.

== History ==
There are two theories for the construction of the palace where the museum operates: a palace built in 1570 by the Ottoman navy officer Yahia Raïs or a palace built in the 18th century for the princess Khédaoudj Al Amia, the daughter of Hassan Khéznadji of Dey Mohamed ben Othman; However, it is believed the princess never lived in the palace. In the early 19th century, the home served as a town hall after being rented out by Khédaoudj's nephews. After French conquest, the palace became the residence of French consul before becoming the first town hall in Algiers. In 1947, the government decided to turn it into a museum which later officially opened in 1961 as the Museum of Popular Arts and Traditions but was not named so until September 29, 1987, where it was decreed so.

== Building ==
The museum itself is a relic. The palace was built with the Moorish architecture style and small nods to the Renaissance architecture style on the marble tiling within the building.

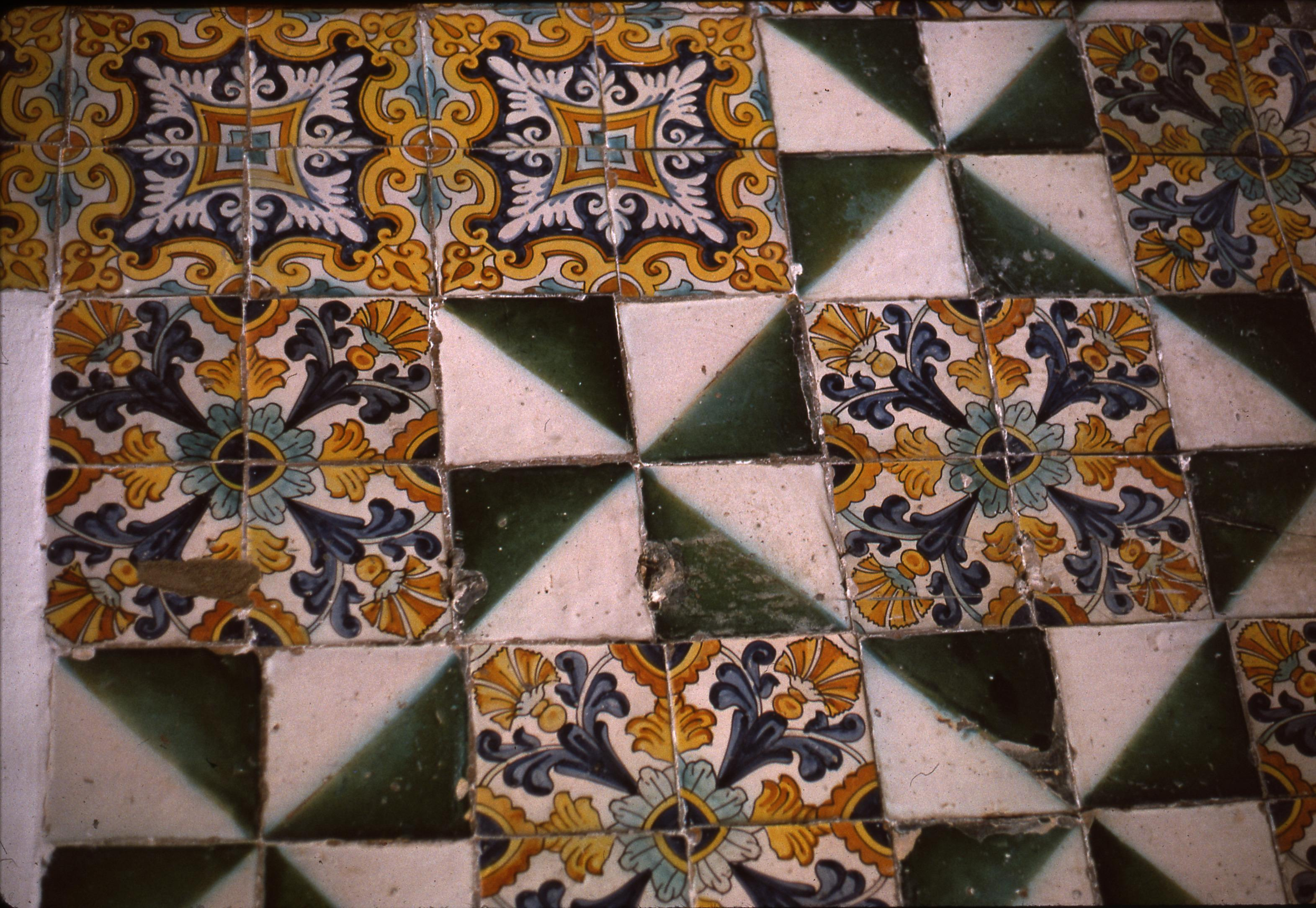
Marble Tiling on ground floor of Museum

The outside of the building is around 575 square meters and consists of a wooden gate surrounded by walls decorated with floral patterns and stone columns. The building consists of two floors and is the only palace in Casbah to have a glass roof on the upstairs patio.

== Collections ==
The museum has, as of 2024, 4,300 artifacts and 14 collections. The collection includes pottery, ceramics, mirrors, musical instruments, and other traditional Algerian craftsmanship. One of the collections sits on the ground floor where traditional kitchenware is displaced. The first floor has four rooms dedicated to for galleries exhibiting traditional clothing. The second floor houses more decorations and pieces pertaining to everyday life, such as the wooden baby carriage and window shutters. The museum also houses over 20,000 photos.

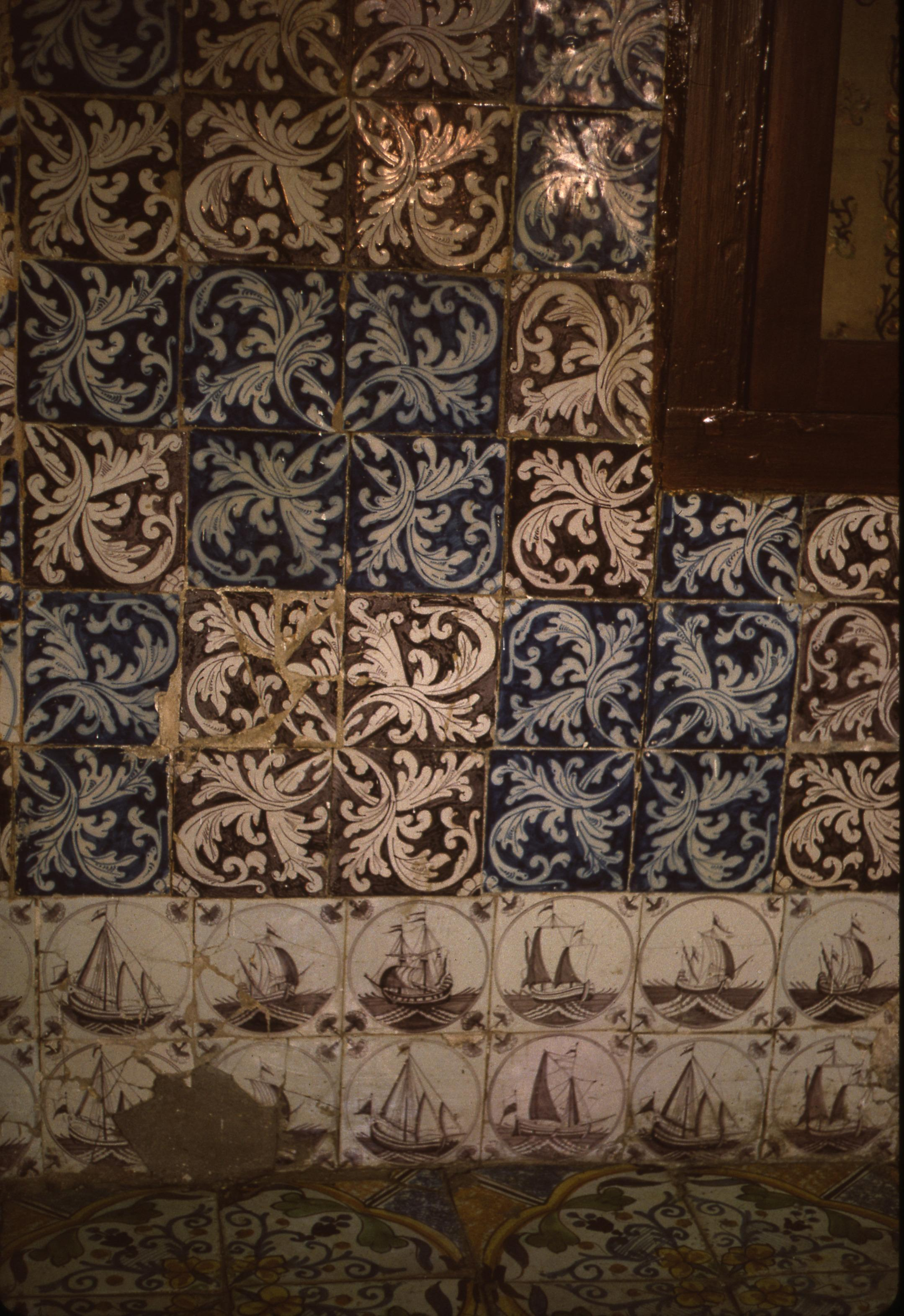
Wall on the side of Museum with flower motifs

== See also ==
- List of museums in Algeria
