= Hotel El-Djazaïr =

Historic hotel in Algiers, Algeria

- فندق الجزائر
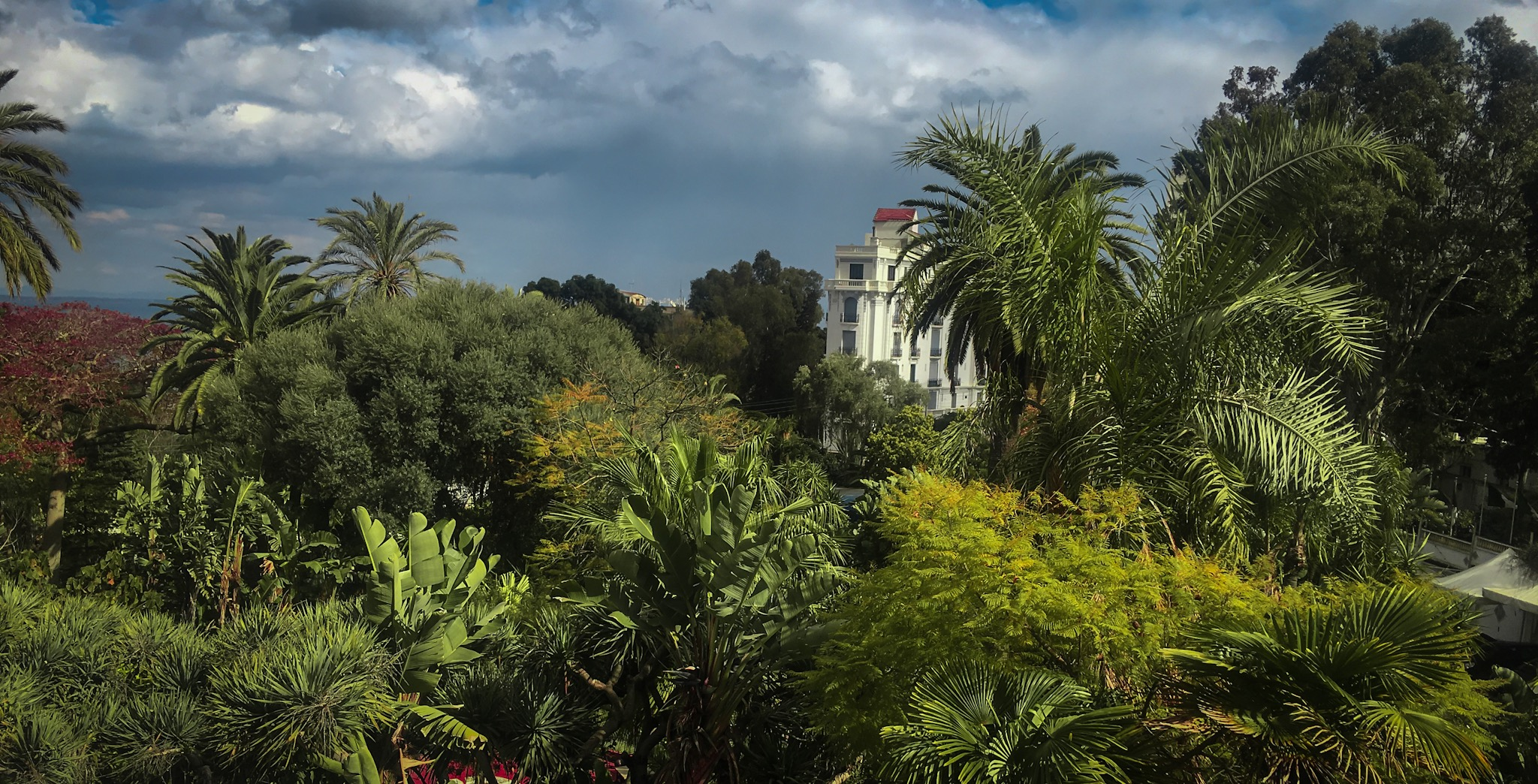
- The hotel and park
- Interactive map of the Hotel El-Djazaïr area

General information
- Location: Algiers, Algeria
- Coordinates: 36°45′N 3°03′E

The Hotel El-Djazaïr, formerly Hôtel Saint-George, is a historic hotel in Algiers. From November 1942 to December 1943, it served as the location for Allied Force Headquarters, led by Dwight D. Eisenhower.

== History ==
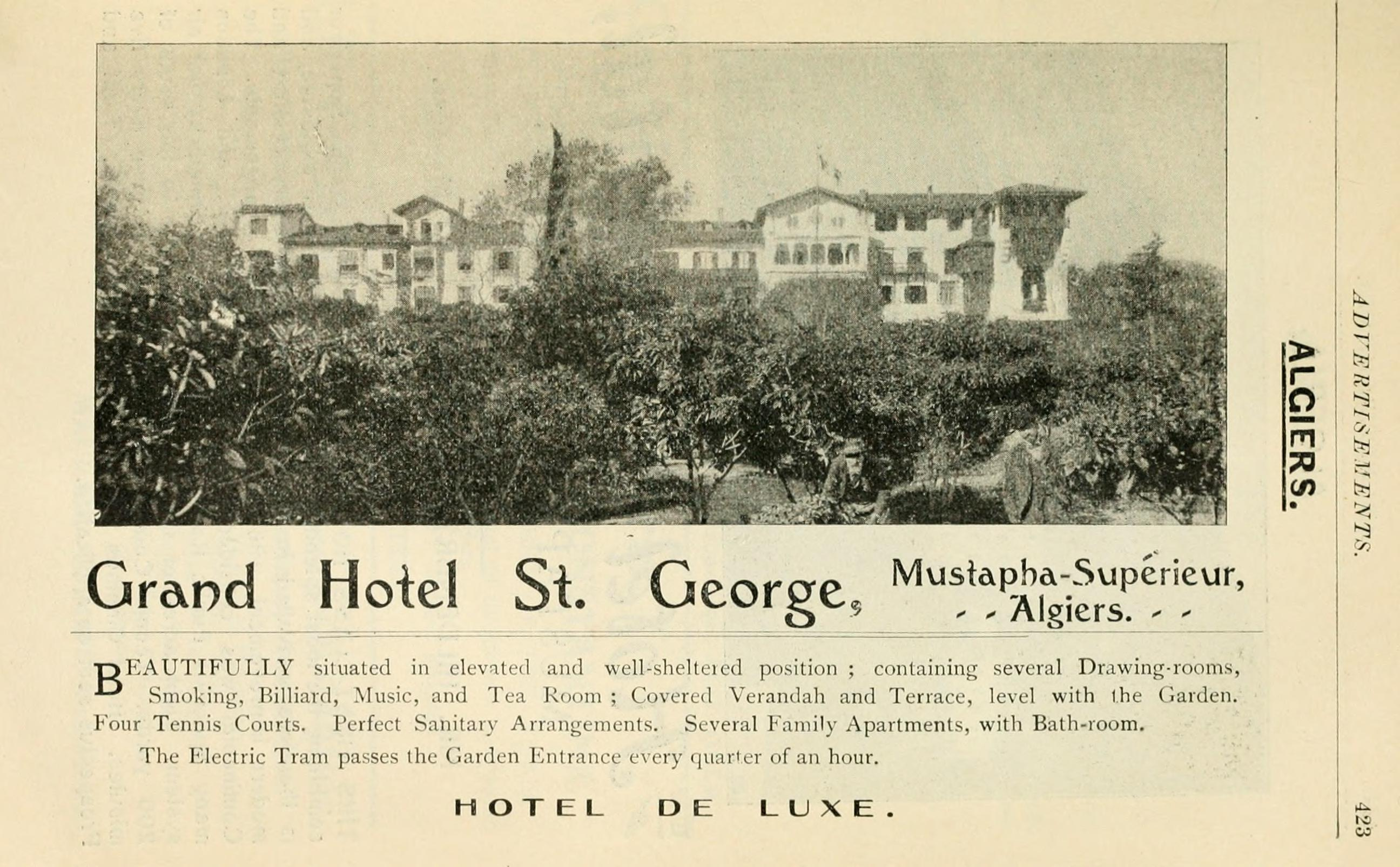
Advertisement for the hotel in 1908

In 1514, a mansion was erected on that site for the Dey, the local ruler under Ottoman Algeria. In 1840, following the invasion of Algiers in 1830, it became a girls' boarding school. In 1889, the site was remodeled into a hotel that became particularly popular with British visitors. Its celebrity guests included Edward VII and Alexandra of Denmark, Édith Piaf, and Winston Churchill.

On 10 November 1942, the hotel was commandeered by the American military. That same day, at noon in the hotel's Salon des Ambassadeurs, Admiral François Darlan signed a ceasefire agreement on behalf of Vichy France, despite formal orders from Vichy, using the fiction that Philippe Pétain was effectively prisoner of the German occupiers and thus unable to expressed his true will.

Eisenhower immediately established his headquarters on the upper floor, room 141, which has been preserved. From there he led the Mediterranean Theater of Operations, United States Army, and remained there until moving to the Supreme Headquarters Allied Expeditionary Force, London in December 1943. By mid-February 1943 it was there that the July target date and tactics for the allied invasion of Sicily were chosen for the successful Operation Husky.

The hotel was repeatedly bombed during World War II by German aviation. After the war's end it had to undergo heavy repair, and only reopened in 1948. It again closed for extensive remodeling in 1974, including two new wings designed by architect Fernand Pouillon, for which works lasted from 1978 to 1982. For its reopening on 23 August 1982, it was rebranded Hôtel El-Djazaïr, for the Arabic name of both Algiers and Algeria (الجزائر). The state-owned El-Djazaïr hotel group also has hotels in Timimoun, Béchar, and Bou Saâda.

== See also ==
- Dar Hassan Pacha
- Dar Aziza
- Dar Mustapha Pacha
- Palace of the Dey
