= People's Palace (Algiers) =

Public building in Algiers

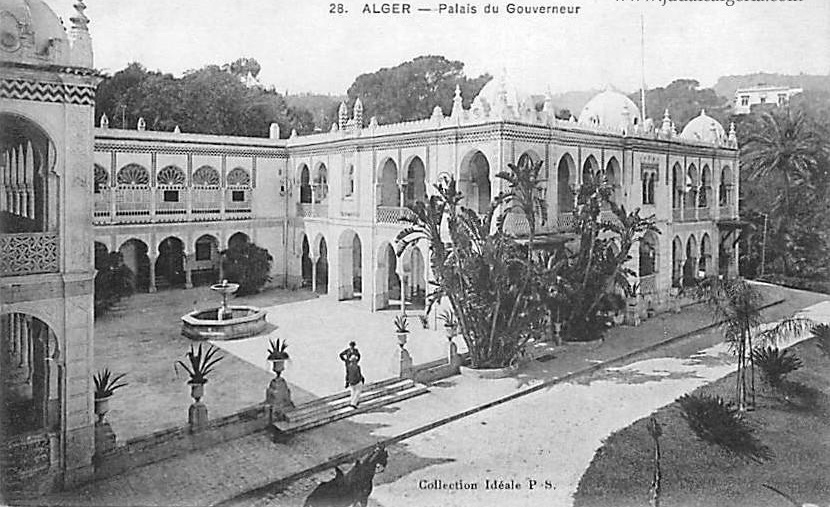
Palais d’été during the colonial era

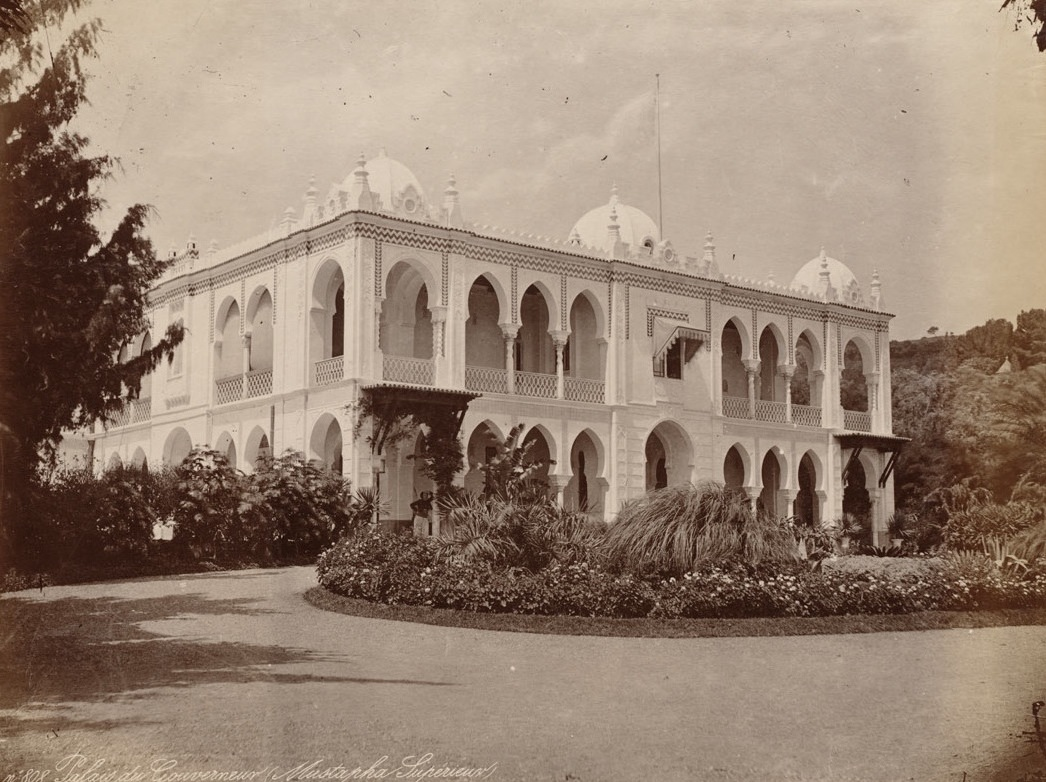
Main façade before 1910s remodeling

The People's Palace (Arabic: قصر الشعب, French: Palais du Peuple), formerly Palais d'été ("Summer Palace" of the Governor), is a public building in Algiers. It was first built in the State of Algiers era, then became the residence of the Governor of French Algeria, and was the seat of government during the first three years of Independent Algeria (1962-1965). Its current appearance dates to the colonial period.

The palace is believed to have been built between 1798 and 1805. It was the country home of Mustapha Khodja el Kheil, a minister of the Dey. It became an army barracks from 1830 to 1846 following the French conquest of Algeria. It was expanded beginning in 1846, and around 1865 was used as the seat of the governor during the summer. During the winter, the governor resided in the palais d'hiver also known as Dar Hassan Pacha, on the northern side of Saint-Philip Cathedral (now the Ketchaoua Mosque) in the Casbah of Algiers.

Its last significant expansion, designed by architect Gabriel Darbéda, was completed in 1919.

This was the location of which French admiral François Darlan was assassinated by anti-Vichyist and monarchist Fernand Bonnier de La Chapelle on 24 December 1942.

Ahmed Ben Bella renamed it and made it the seat of government following the end of the country's war of independence. Following the 1965 Algerian coup d'état, Houari Boumédiène transferred the President's Office to the newly built El Mouradia Palace. The palace has since been used as an official guest house and for various cultural and governmental functions.

== See also ==
- Dar Aziza
- Dar Hassan Pacha
- Dar Mustapha Pacha
- Government Palace (Algiers)
- Palace of the Dey
