= Larbi Ben M'Hidi Street =

Street in Alger Centre, Algeria

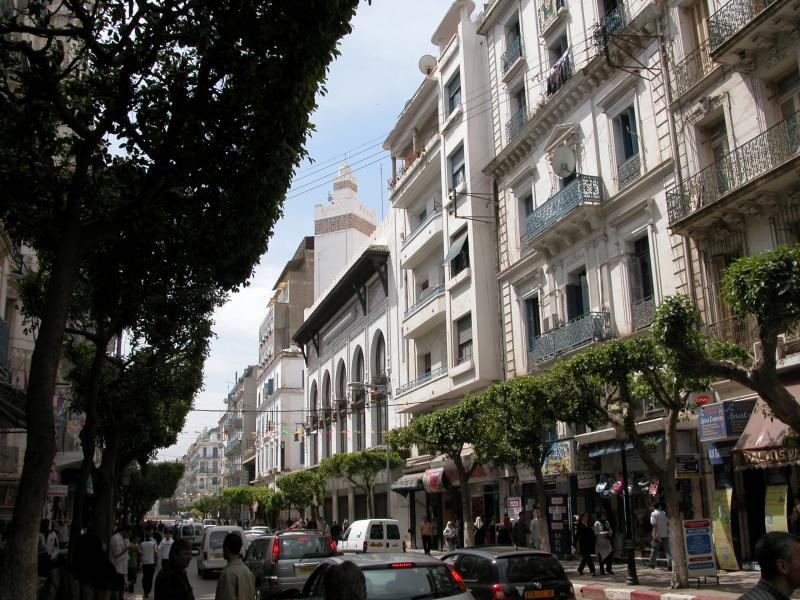
- Larbi Ben M'Hidi Street in 2005
- Interactive map of Larbi Ben M'Hidi Street
- Former name: Rue d'Isly
- Namesake: Larbi Ben M'hidi
- Length: 380 m
- Width: 18 m
- Location: Algiers, Algeria
- Nearest metro station: Ali Boumendjel; Tafourah-Grande Poste

Larbi Ben M'Hidi Street (in Arabic: شارع العربي بن مهيدي), formerly known as Rue d'Isly, is a street in Algiers, Algeria.

== Location and access ==
This street is one of the main commercial arteries in downtown Algiers leading from Grande Poste square to Bab El Oued. It is cut in the middle by Place de l'Émir-Abdelkader.

It is accessible by the ETUSA bus, line 36, as well as the two metro stations Ali Boumendjel and Tafourah-Grande Poste.

== Origin of the name ==
It honors Larbi Ben M'hidi (1923–1957), one of the founders of the National Liberation Front (FLN).

== History ==
Formerly known as the "Rue d'Isly", it was renamed "Larbi Ben M'Hidi Street" after the departure of the French.

On 26 March 1962, a shootout occurred here during the Algerian War, resulting in 80 deaths and over 200 injuries.

== Notable buildings and memorials ==
- No. 18: The building called L'Historial by architect Larbi Marhoum.
- No. 25: Algiers Museum of Modern Art, former Algériennes Galleries.
- No. 42: Headquarters of the National Institute of Industrial Property (Algeria)
