= People's National Assembly building (Algiers) =

Meeting place of the Algerian People's National Assembly

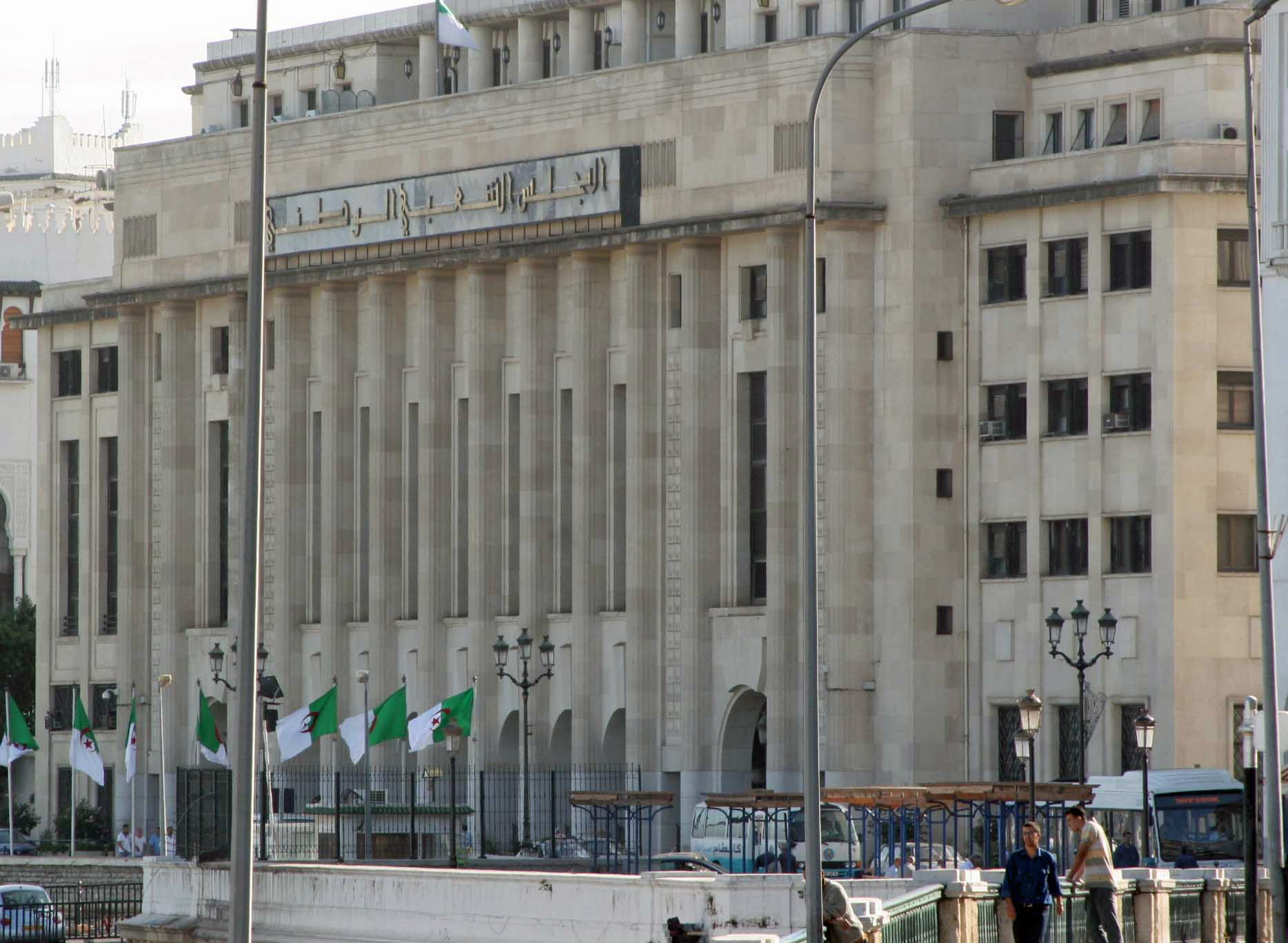
Seafront façade

The People's National Assembly building is a public building in Algiers and home of Algeria's People's National Assembly. It was designed in 1934 and inaugurated in 1951 as a new city hall for the Greater Algiers, and repurposed following the country's independence in 1962.

== Background ==
The building's location was previously used by a logistical branch of the French military (manutention militaire), built during the Second French Empire.

The municipality had previously been located, from 1850 to 1883, in the Vieux Palais of the Casbah of Algiers; and from 1883 to the mid-20th century on the Algiers waterfront, now Boulevard Zighoud-Youcef, in the former Hôtel d'Orient building that still hosts the Casbah municipality.

== History ==
In 1934, an architectural competition was held to build a new city hall for the expanding metropolis of Algiers. The competition's winners, the Paris-based brothers Edouard and Jean Niermans in a team with local architect Jean-Louis Ferlié, designed a compact building in late Art Deco or Stripped Classicism style. The building was substantially completed in 1941 but was then used in the wartime context by civilian and military departments of the French state, which only returned it to the Algiers municipality in 1945. Given the post-war scarcity, the finishing works were protracted and not entirely completed at the time of official inauguration in 1951.

In the 2010s, plans were considered to relocate the People's National Assembly and the Council of the Nation in a new Algerian Parliament complex, to be built northeast of Les Fusillés Station in the waterfront neighborhood of Hussein Dey.

== See also ==
- Palace of the Council of the Nation (Algiers)
- Government Palace (Algiers)
- People's Palace (Algiers)
- El Mouradia Palace
