= Palace of the Council of the Nation (Algiers) =

Meeting place of the upper house of the Algerian Parliament

The Palace of the Council of the Nation is the home of the Council of the Nation, the upper house of the Algerian Parliament, in Algiers, Algeria. It is located on Boulevard Zighoud-Youcef on the Algiers waterfront.

== History ==
The building was built in 1865 on a design by architects Louis Clovis Lefèvre and Pierre Auguste Guiauchain, as the home of the Algiers tax and post office (French: hôtel du trésor et des postes). Between 1912 and 1920, it was comprehensively remodeled by architect Gabriel Darbéda, who also worked on the Summer Palace at the same time, in order to host the délégations financières, a limited-purpose assembly with power over local fiscal affairs but no broad legislative mandate. Between 1948 and 1956 the Assemblée algérienne, which succeeded the délégations financières, was located in the building.

The building has been the home of the Council of the Nation since its establishment in 1997, after decades of unicameralism following the Algerian War and the country's independence in 1962.

In the 2010s, plans were considered to relocate the Council of the Nation and the People's National Assembly in a new Algerian Parliament complex, to be built northeast of Les Fusillés Station in the waterfront neighborhood of Hussein Dey.

== See also ==
- People's National Assembly building (Algiers)
- Government Palace (Algiers)
- People's Palace (Algiers)
- El Mouradia Palace
