= Ketchaoua Mosque =

Mosque in Algiers, Algeria

- جامع كتشاوة
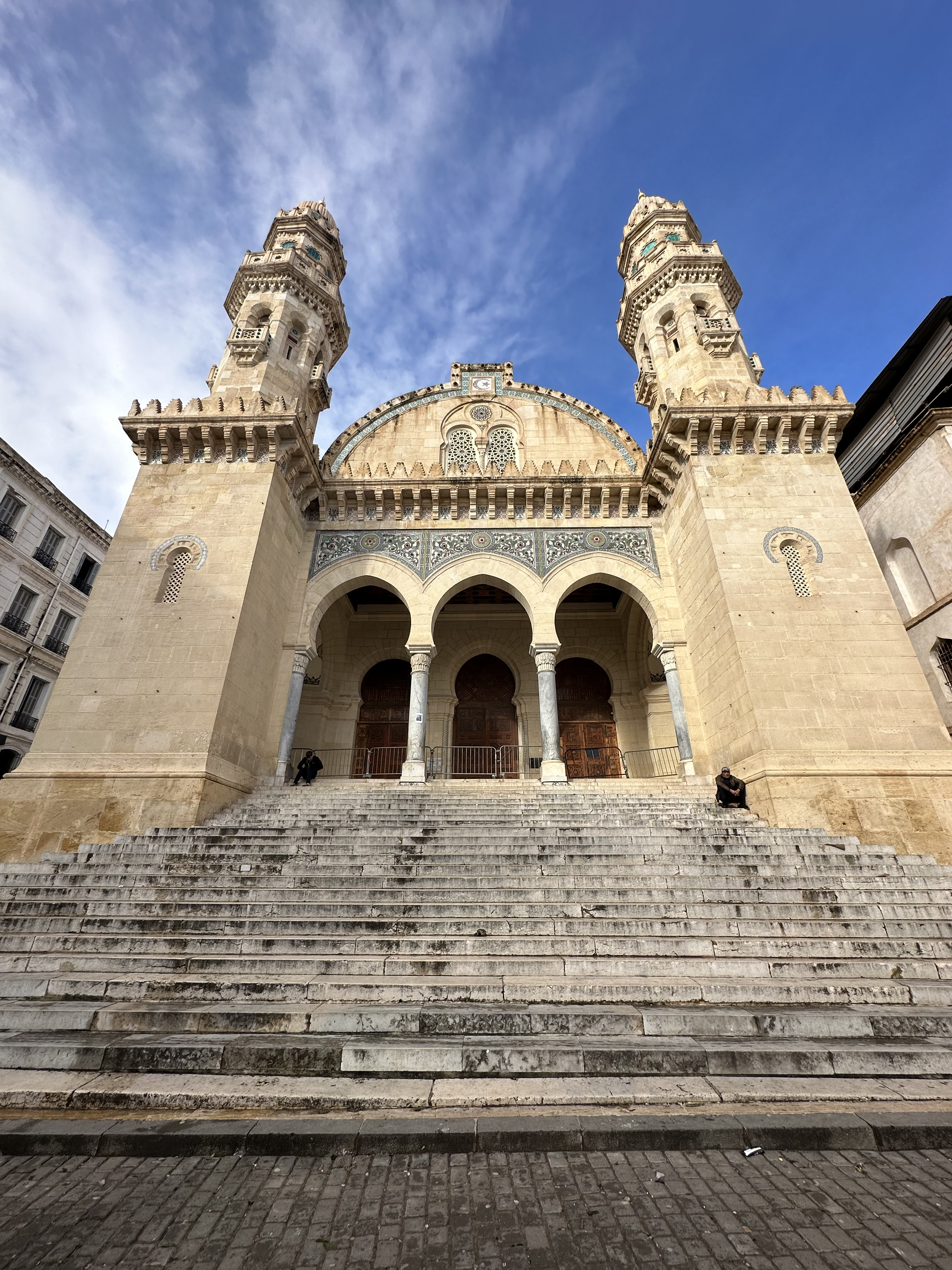
- The mosque facade in 2023

- Location of the mosque in Algiers

Religion
- Affiliation: Sunni Islam
- Ecclesiastical or organisational status: Mosque (1612–1831); Cathedral (1832–1962); Mosque (since 1962– )
- Status: Active

Location
- Location: Casbah, Algiers
- Country: Algeria
- Interactive map of Ketchaoua Mosque
- Coordinates: 36°47′6″N 3°3′38″E

Architecture
- Style: Moorish; Byzantine
- Completed: 1020 AH (1611/1612 CE) (as a mosque); 1208 AH (1793/1794 CE) (rebuilt); 1860 CE (rebuilt as a cathedral); 1962 CE (converted to a mosque)
- Demolished: 1844

Specifications
- Minaret: 2
- Materials: Stone; marble

UNESCO World Heritage Site
- Part of: Casbah of Algiers
- Criteria: Cultural: (ii), (v)
- Reference: 565
- Inscription: 1992 (16th Session)

The Ketchaoua Mosque (Arabic: جامع كتشاوة), also known as Djamaa Ketchaoua, is a mosque in the city of Algiers, the capital of Algeria. Completed in the 17th century, during Ottoman period, the mosque is located at the foot of the Casbah of Algiers, a UNESCO World Heritage Site and is on the first of the Casbah's many steep stairways. Its construction was logistically and symbolically a cynosure of pre-colonial Algiers. The mosque is noted for its unique fusion of Moorish and Byzantine architecture.

Built by Hayreddin Barbarossa as a mosque in 1020 AH (1611/1612 CE), in 1831 Muslims were evicted under French rule and the structure was converted to a Roman Catholic cathedral in 1832, renamed as the Cathedral of St Philippe (French: Cathédrale Saint-Philippe), which it remained until 1962. The former mosque-church was demolished between 1845 and 1860 and a new cathedral was built. Following Algerian independence in 1962, this structure was converted back into a mosque. In spite of these transitions, the mosque has retained its original grandeur and is one of the major tourist attractions of Algiers.

== Geography ==
The Ketchaoua Mosque is located in the Casbah of Algiers in the southern part of the city, approximately 250 metres (820 ft) east of the Djamaa el Kebir Mosque, near the Archbishop's Palace of Algiers and National Library of Algeria. The mosque, built during the city's Ottoman period, was once at the centre of the city. Its strategic location on the first of the Casbah's stairways leading to the five gates of the city, lies in the aristocratic district where lived the rich and the famous royal family members of the Ottoman Regency, the politically prominent, and business magnates. It was built on the site of an icosium, a Phoenician settlement at the site of the mosque.

== History ==
=== Origins ===
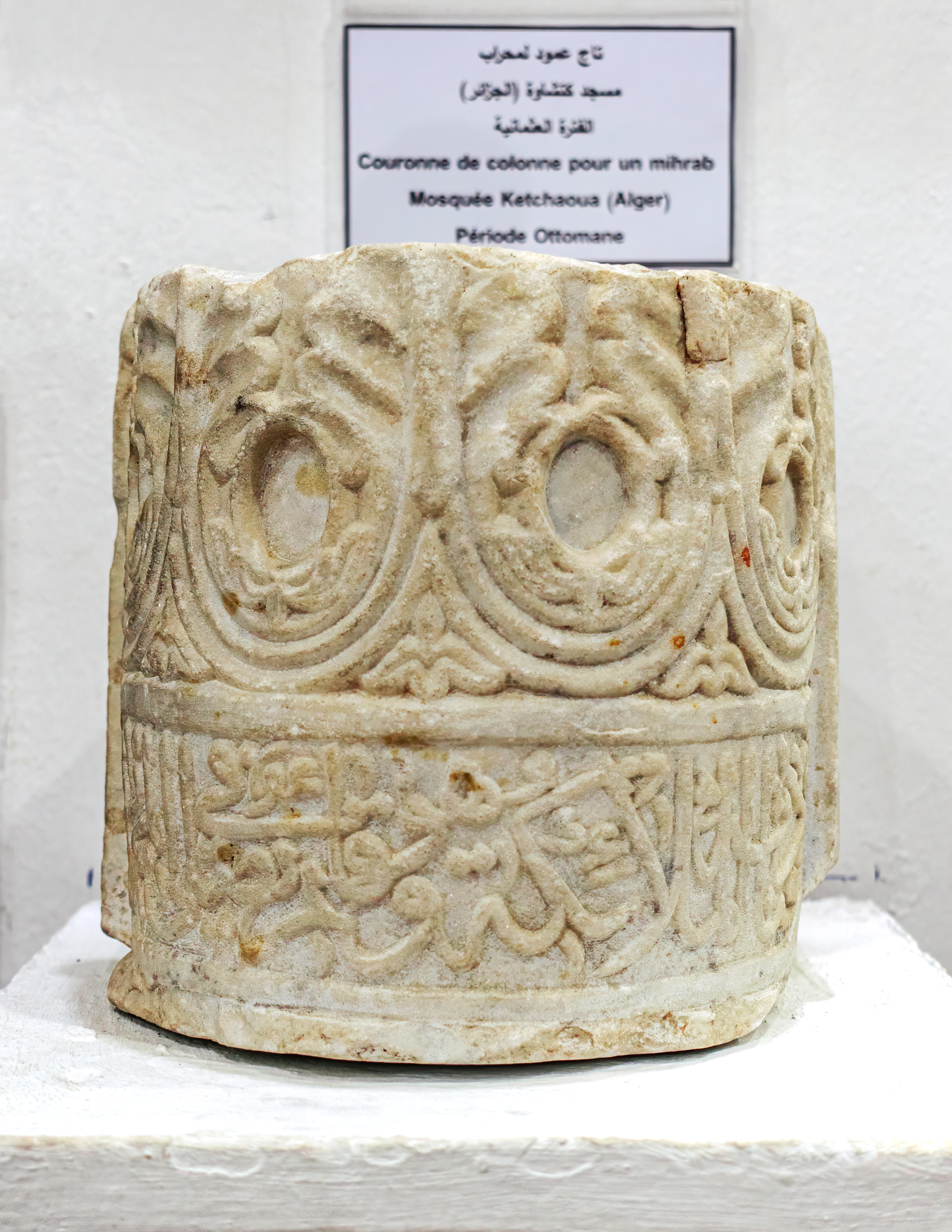
Crown of columns for the mihrab of the original Ketchoua Mosque.

The Casbah (fortress), constructed next to the Mediterranean Sea shore, is a unique kind of medina, or Islamic city, which predates construction of the Ketchaoua Mosque at its centre. It overlooks the islands where a Carthaginian trading-post was established in the 6th century BCE, but the city of Algiers was founded in the 10th century CE by the Zirids. Over the next several centuries the Berbers, Romans, Byzantines, Arabs and Spaniards all made an impact.

The history of the Ketchaoua Mosque is integral to the ancient history of the Casbah, recognized on the UNESCO World Heritage List. Its exact location was at the centre of the city at the intersection of the roads from the lower Casbah leading to the five gates of the Algiers city. An unconfirmed mention is made of the mosque in the 14th century, (Note: The early history of the mosque is debated, with some sources indicating that a mosque was constructed during the 11th century CE.) but the confirmed "notarial document" dates it from 1020 AH (1611/1612 CE). It was rebuilt, according to a commemorative inscription in 1208 AH (1793/1794 CE), when it was glorified as a structure of "unparalleled beauty.”

=== Modern period ===
At the orders of General Savary several hundred Algerians protesting this violation of guarantees given by a previous French military commander General Bourmont were evicted at bayonet-point from the mosque in December 1831 before it was consecrated as the cathedral of Saint Philippe on Christmas Day, 1832. In 1838, following the French conquest of the Algerian city of Constantine, Marshal Sylvain Charles Valée mounted a cross on top of the mosque. When Muslims camped inside the building in protest, Savary demolished the mosque, massacred approximately 4,000 worshippers inside the mosque, and burned copies of the Quran.

Between 1845 and 1860 the old mosque was demolished and a new church was built. After the liberation of Algeria from French rule, the cathedral's restoration as the Ketchaoua Mosque in 1962 is considered as "having significant religious and cultural importance," and it richly testifies to the history of "this mosque-turned-cathedral-turned-mosque". The rededication of the cathedral into a mosque was performed in the first year of Algerian independence, in a formal ceremony presided over by Tawfiq al Madani, the Minister of Harbours, held at the Ben Badis Square (earlier known as Lavigere). This event has also been described as "correlatively for the reconquest of Algeria’s authenticity as a supreme symbol of the nation’s recovery of its integrity." The bells of the cathedral were given in 1965 to the church of Le Vieux-Marché where Louis Massignon had established a Christian-Muslim pilgrimage during the independence war.

Apart from the Ketchaoua Mosque, there are remains of the citadel, other old mosques and Ottoman-style palaces, as well as the remains of a traditional urban structure.

== Architecture ==
The principal entrance to the mosque is through a flight of 23 steps. At the entrance is an ornamented portico supported by four black-veined marble columns. Inside the mosque are arcades of white marble columns. The beauty of the mosque's chambers, minarets and ceilings is accentuated by the distinctly Moorish plaster work. The mosque overlooks the public square in the Casbah, with the sea in front; it has two octagonal minarets flanking the entrance, with Byzantine and Moorish design and decorations. Many of the white marble columns belong to the original mosque. There is a tomb with the remains of San Geronimo enshrined in one of the chambers in the mosque.

An earthquake in 2003 damaged the mosque and forced its temporary closure.

=== Restoration ===
In 2009, the Heritage Department of Algeria began improvements to the octagonal minarets, the central vault of the main fascia and the abutting staircase inside the mosque. These were to be completed over 12 months. With the minarets, which were on the brink of partial collapse, restoration plans were developed for implementation in three stages, including the restoration of the Casbah itself. Launched in September 2008, the plan covered the renovation of several other mosques in old Algiers and the conversion of several houses into libraries, estimated to cost 300 million Algerian dinars (US$21 billion in 2008).

In April 2018, the mosque was reopened following its restoration by the Turkish International Cooperation and Development Agency. The mosque was restored in line with the original Ottoman architectural plan according to historians and researchers from both Algeria and Turkey.

== Gallery ==
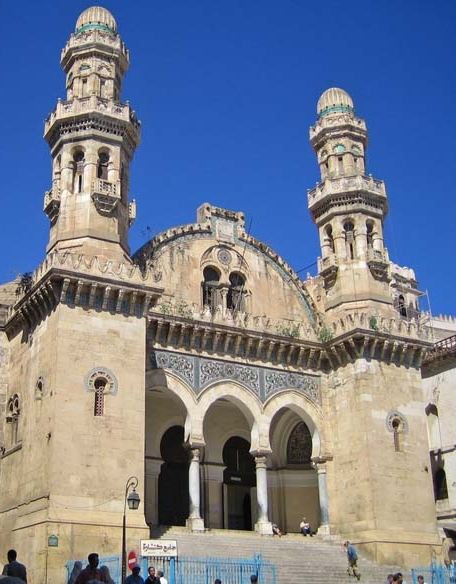
Front full view

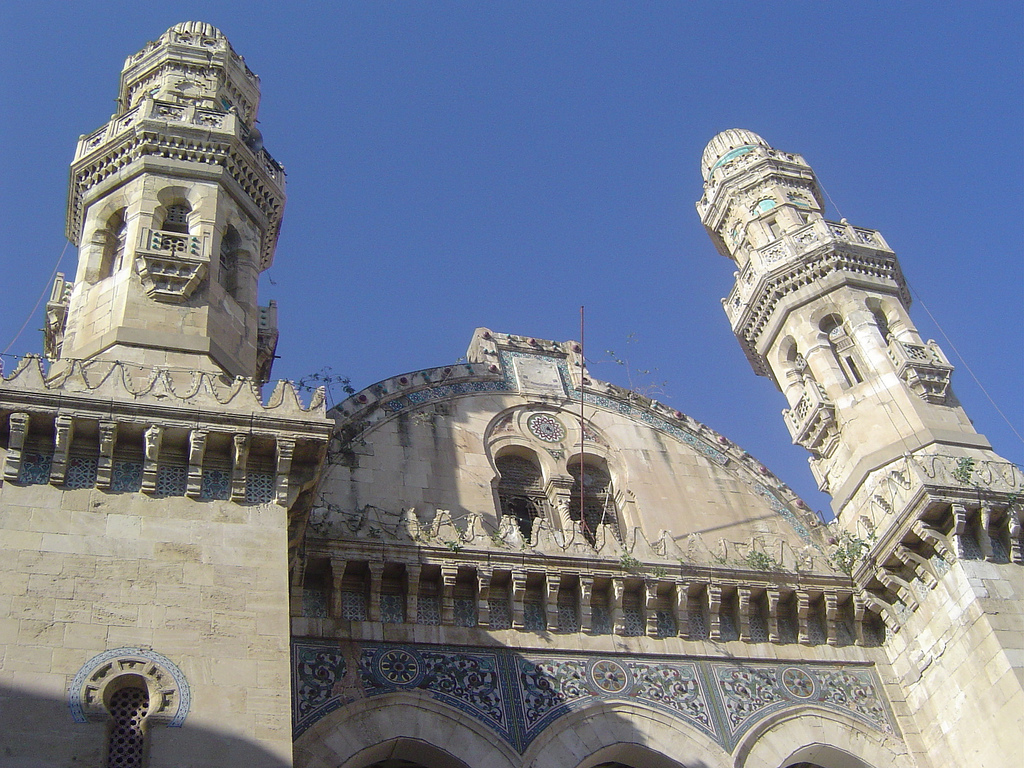
Front top during renovation

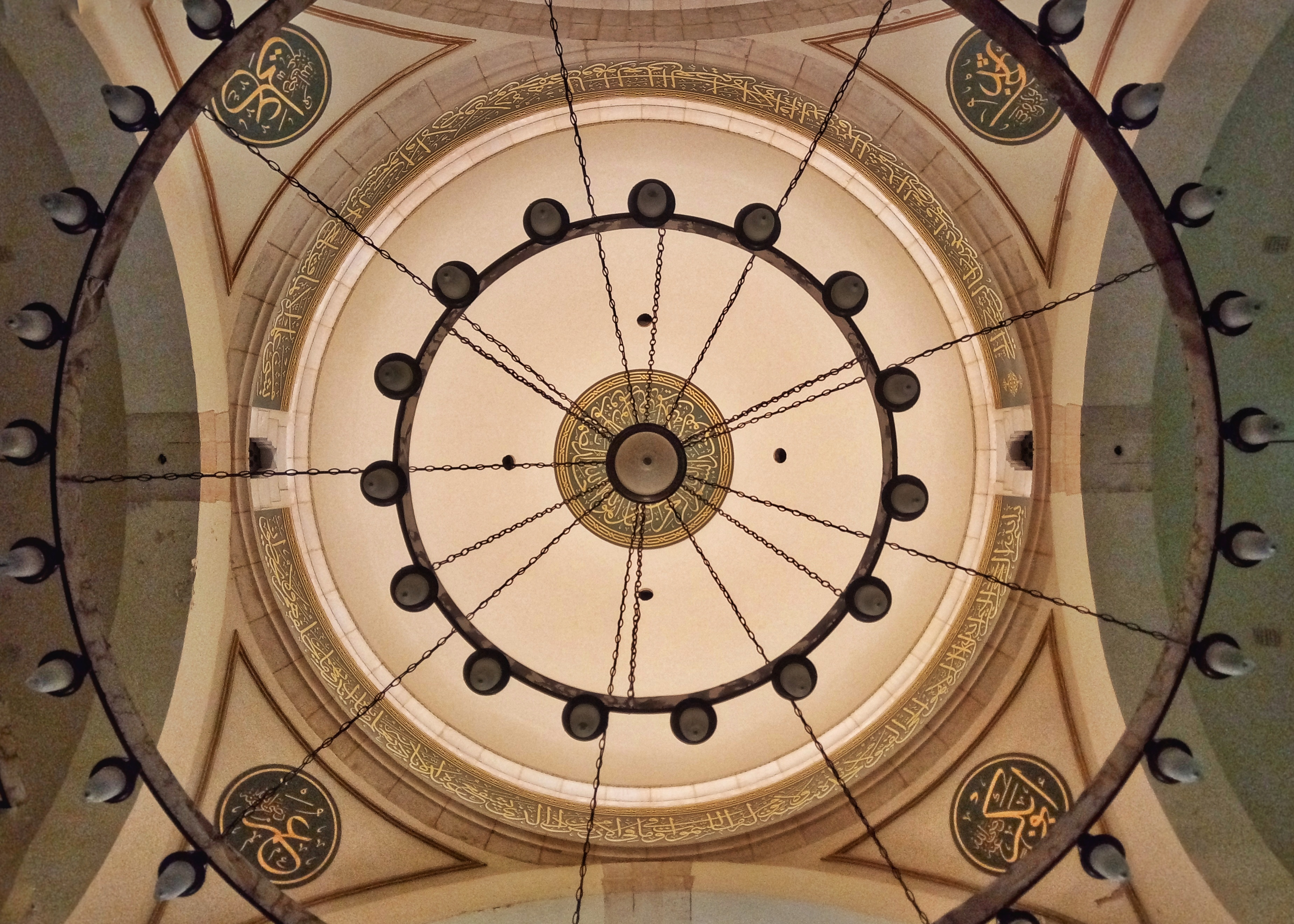
The interior of the dome

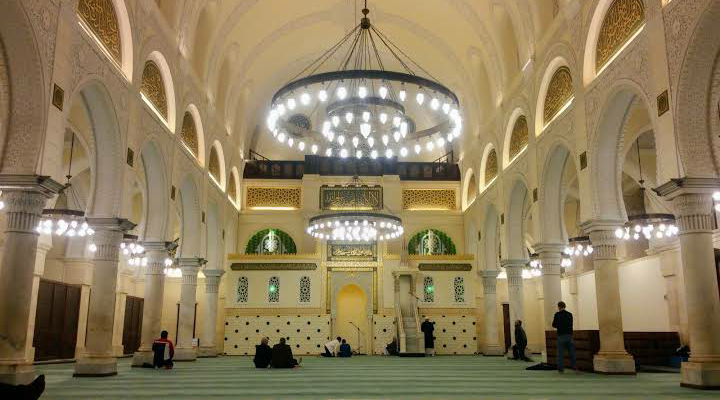
Inside the mosque

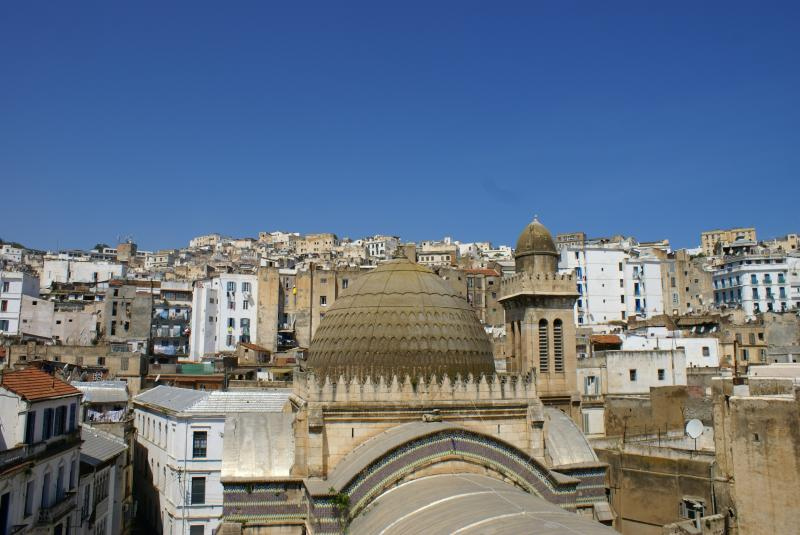
The dome

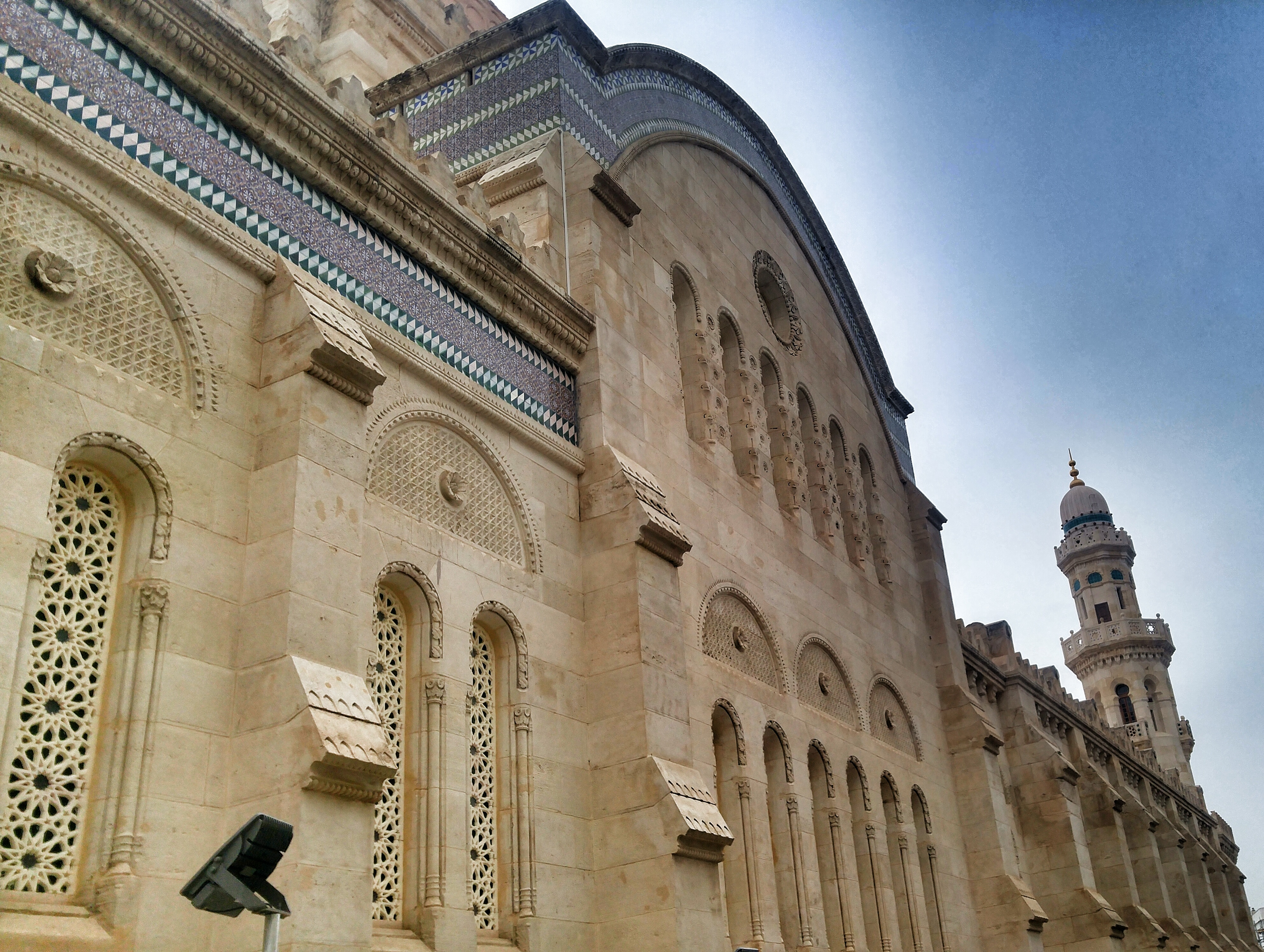
The mosque side wall

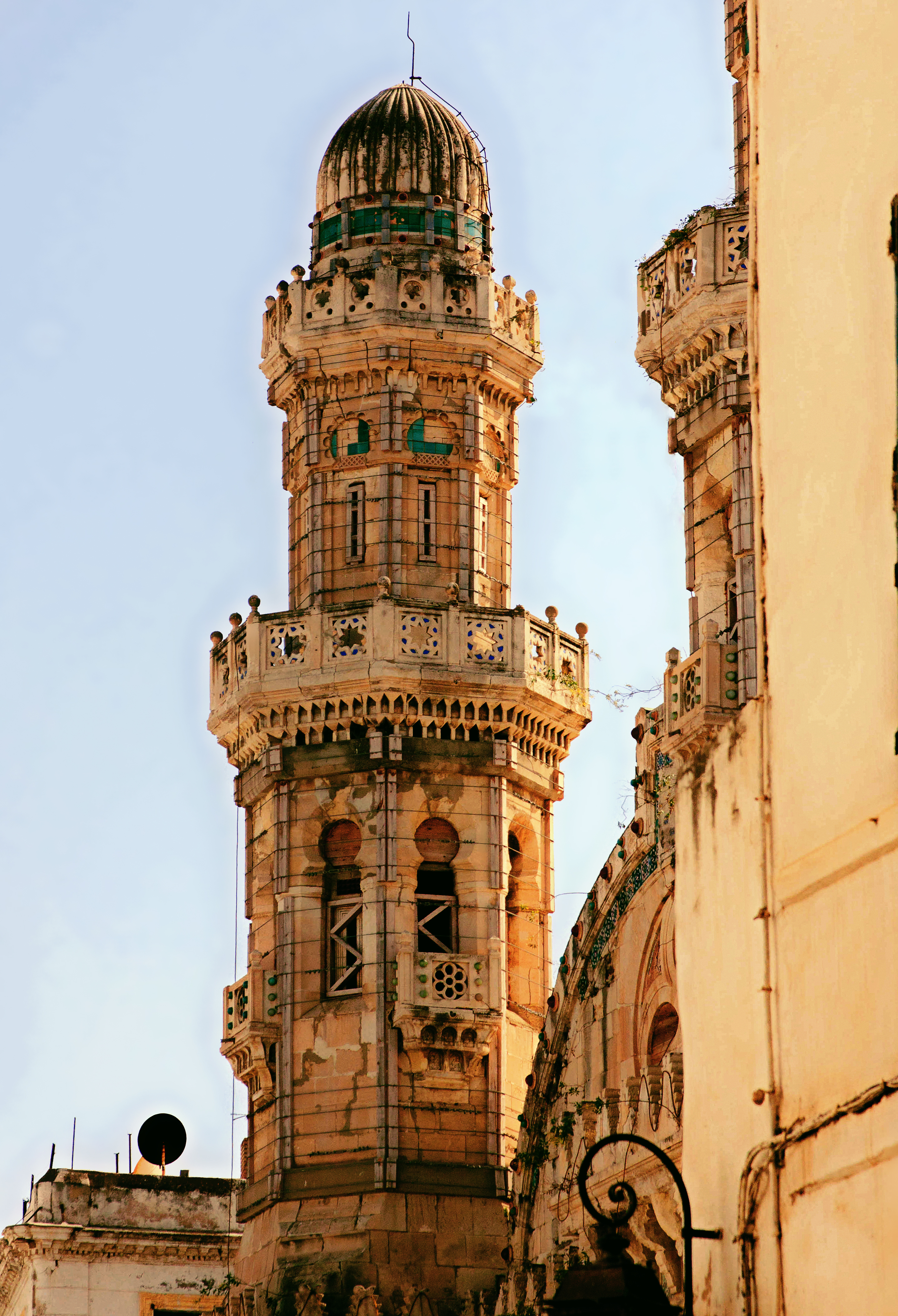
One of the mosque minarets

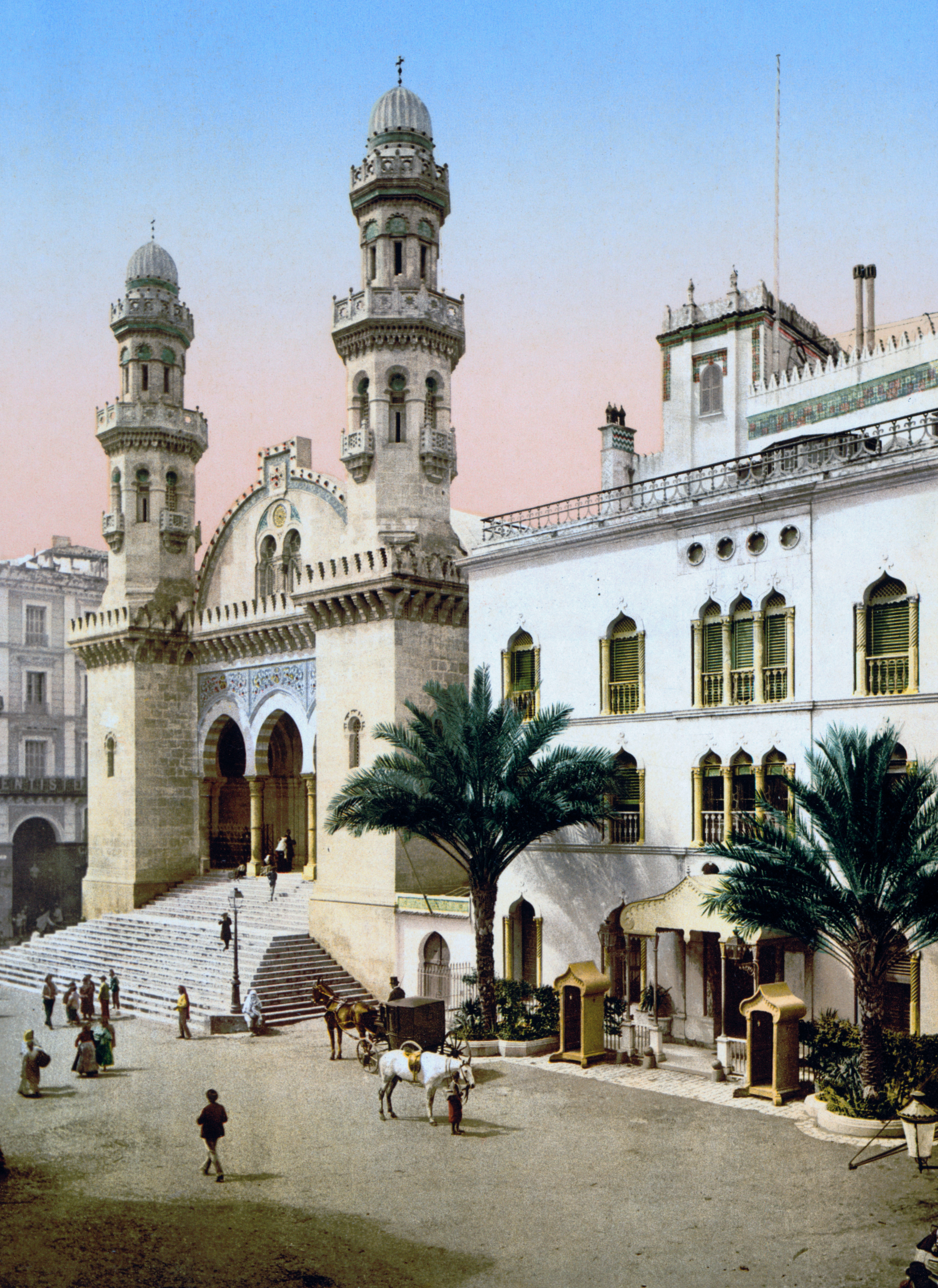
During French rule, in 1899

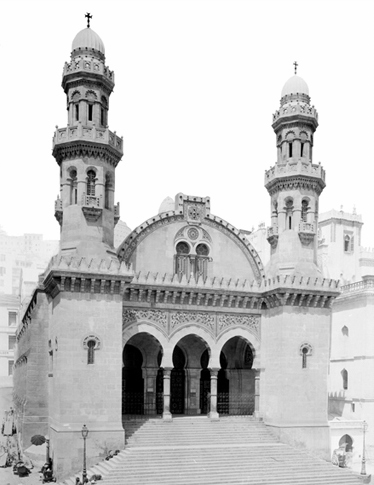
St. Philippe Cathedral, in 1905

== See also ==
- Islam in Algeria
- List of mosques in Algeria
- List of World Heritage Sites in Algeria
