= El Mouradia Palace =

Office and residence of the President of Algeria

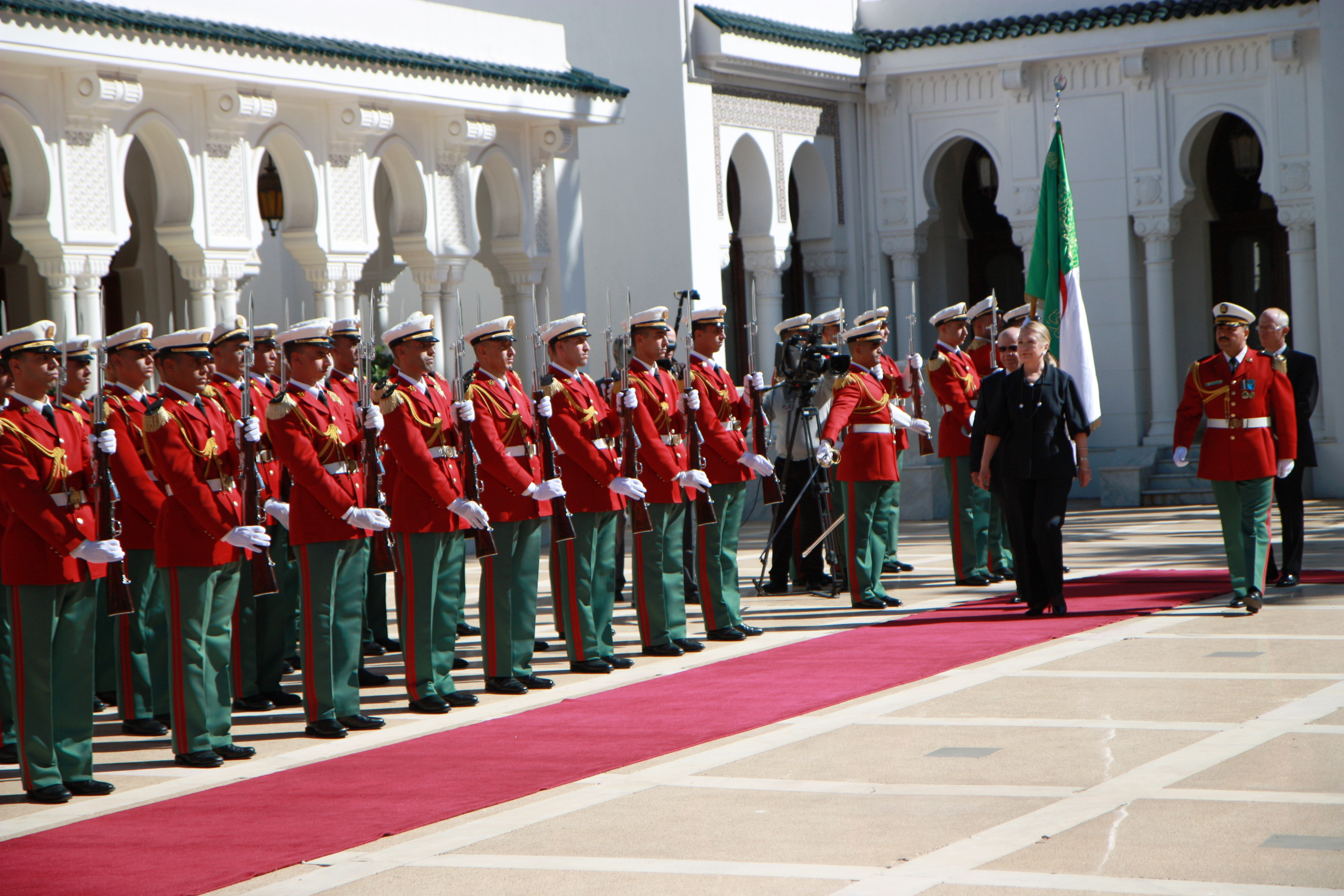
- U.S. Secretary of State Hillary Clinton preparing to meet the Algerian president in 2012.
- Interactive map of the El Mouradia Palace area

General information
- Architectural style: Moorish
- Location: El Mouradia, Algeria
- Opened: 1952; 74 years ago

El Mouradia Palace (Arabic: قصر المرادية) is the office and residence of the president of Algeria. It is located in the neighborhood of El Mouradia on the hills overlooking Algiers. "El Mouradia" is also widely used as a shorthand for the Algerian president's office.

== History ==
The first president of independent Algeria, Ahmed Ben Bella, set up his offices at the Summer Palace formerly used by French governors, but lived at Villa Joly. It was there that he was arrested during Houari Boumédiène's 1965 coup.

The latter, upon becoming president, did not want to settle in either the Government Palace, which was built by the French, or the Summer Palace with its echoes of both the Ottoman and French eras; instead, he chose to install the presidency a little higher in the district of El Mouradia, which was named after the martyr Didouche Mourad. He had a palace built there in the Moorish Revival architecture style. The site also suited his preference for secrecy.

== Description ==
This palace is the official residence of the president of the People's Democratic Republic of Algeria. It is located on the heights of Algiers, about 4 km south of the city centre.

The palace has been occupied by several presidents, namely: Houari Boumédiène, Rabah Bitat, Chadli Bendjedid, Mohamed Boudiaf, Ali Kafi, Liamine Zéroual, Abdelaziz Bouteflika, Abdelkader Bensalah (acting president), and since 2020, the current president Abdelmadjid Tebboune.

== Security ==
The security of the palace is provided by the Directorate of Security and Presidential Protection and Republican Guard.

== See also ==
- Government Palace (Algiers)
- People's Palace (Algiers)
- People's National Assembly building (Algiers)
- Palace of the Council of the Nation (Algiers)
