= 1716 Algiers earthquake =

Earthquake in Algeria

- Location within Algeria
- Local date: 3 February–May 1716
- Magnitude: M_{w} 7.0
- Epicenter: 36.7°N 3.1°E
- Areas affected: Algeria
- Max. intensity: EMS-98 IX (Destructive) – EMS-98 X (Very destructive)
- Casualties: 20,000 dead

The 1716 Algiers earthquake was part of a seismic sequence which began in February and ended in May 1716. The largest and most destructive shock occurred on February 3 with an estimated moment magnitude of 7.0. The earthquakes with an epicenter thought to be in the Algiers region had a maximum European macroseismic scale (EMS-98) intensity of IX (Destructive), killing approximately 20,000 people. The earthquake was felt in Catania and Syracuse on the Italian island Sicily.

== Tectonic setting ==
The nation of Algeria lie near a complex and poorly defined convergent plate boundary separating the African plate from the Eurasian plate. The converging plates create a zone of compression in northern Algeria, which are accommodated by mainly thrust and reverse faults onshore and inland. Thrusting of strata due to compression formed the Atlas Mountains in Algeria and Morocco. The tectonic situation of Algeria also makes the country vulnerable to large and deadly seismic events with magnitudes greater than 6.0. The offshore thrust faults also pose a tsunami threat to the Algerian coast during large earthquakes.

== Earthquake ==
A north-west dipping thrust fault known as the Sahel Fault which runs along the north coast of Algeria is thought to be the source of the quake. Paleoseismology studies along the approximately 60-km-long fault revealed evidence of a major earthquake(s) occurring at the same period as the destructive quake. Surface ruptures uncovered by trenching, and radiocarbon dating of charcoal led to the identification of two historical earthquakes before 1211 A.D., three between 778 A.D. and 1779 A.D., and three after 1727 A.D.. The 1716 earthquake, along with another event in 1365 fell within the range of paleoearthquakes and may correspond with activity on the Sahel Fault.

In an earthquake catalog by Hamdache and other researchers, the moment magnitude was placed at 7.0 M_{w} with an epicenter location at 36.7°N 3.1°E.

== Impact ==
The first shock occurred on the morning of 3 February at 9:45 a.m. local time. It collapsed many poorly constructed homes in Algiers. Well-constructed buildings including a mosque suffered extensive cracks throughout. Detailed documentation of damage to 204 homes and four mosques or palaces. Algiers was mostly destroyed after the earthquake. At the Dar Aziza, the upper floors experienced a collapse and walls cracked. Many homes up to 3 km away from Algiers were also damaged. The city was once again rocked by a second violent shock assigned IX (Destructive). The aftershock caused more damage and collapsed structures that were intact after the February 3 quake.

== See also ==
- List of historical earthquakes
- List of earthquakes in Algeria
