= Boulevard Mohamed-Khemisti =

The Boulevard Mohamed-Khemisti, named after former foreign minister Mohamed Khemisti, is a major artery and public space in Algiers.

== Geography ==
The boulevard runs upwards from east to west, starting near the seashore and ending at the esplanade in front of the Government Palace. It is divided into three sections: a northern boulevard, a middle section of plazas and gardens, and a southern boulevard. The middle section comprises, going from east to west: the place de la Grande Poste, a middle square, known as jardin de la Grande Poste; and on the slope, the Jardin de l'Horloge Fleurie, named after a floral clock, which houses the Memorial to the Liberation of Algeria.

The area is served by the Tafourah - Grande Poste station of the Algiers Metro.

== History ==
The boulevard was created on the location of former fortifications built by the French colonial regime following the destruction of the eastern ramparts of the city at the level of the fort of Bab Azoun and the extension of the urbanization in the direction of the suburb of Agha. It was then named for Édouard Laferrière, a distinguished jurist who had died in mid-1901 shortly after the end of his service as French Governor-General of Algeria. The grounds were acquired in 1900 by a private company, the Compagnie foncière et immobilière de la Ville d'Alger, which developed it as they were made available by the military. The development included several public buildings, namely a customs administration building (completed in 1908), the Grande Poste d'Alger, and the Government Palace.

== Gallery ==
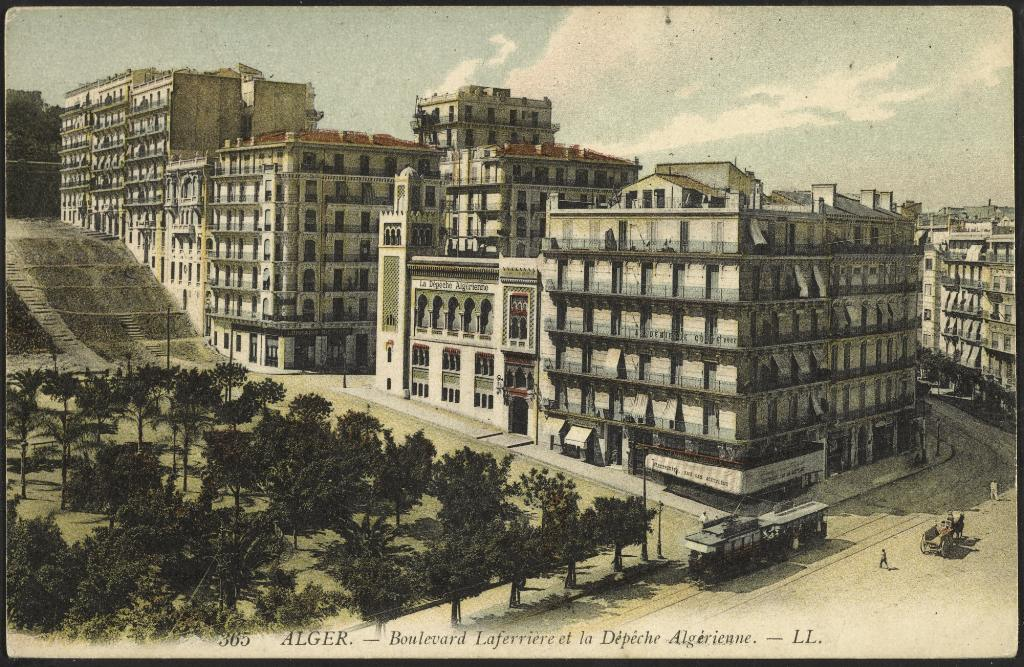
Northern side of the Boulevard Laferrière in the early 20th century

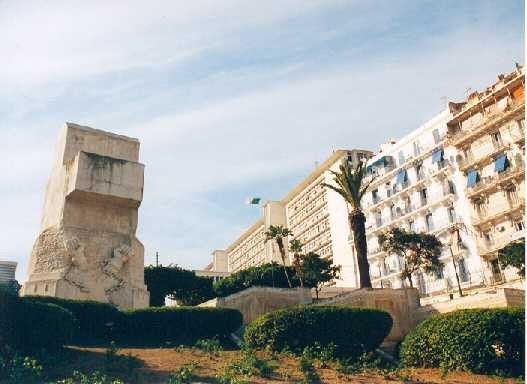
Upper section of the Boulevard viewed from the east, with the Memorial to the Liberation of Algeria in the foreground and the Government Palace in the background

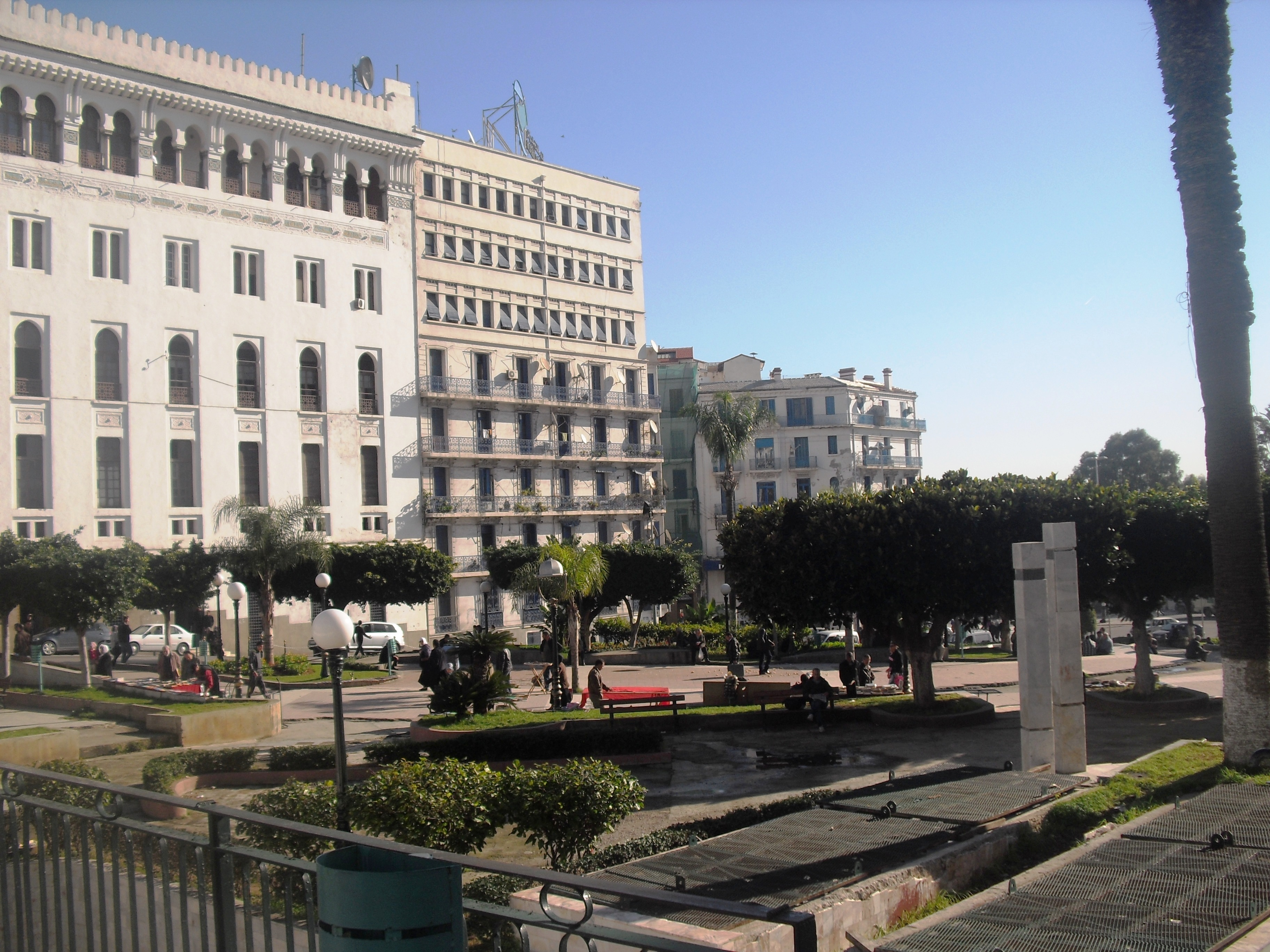
Lower section of the Boulevard Khemisti in 2011

== See also ==
- Martyrs' Square, Tripoli
- Mohammed V Square
