= Dar Hassan Pacha =

Coordinates: 36°47′8.8″N 3°3′38.7″E

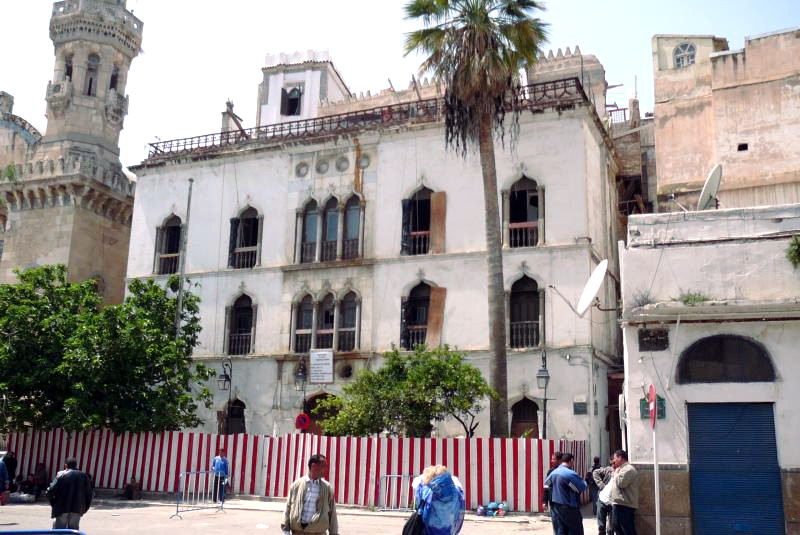
- Dar Hassan Pacha
- Interactive map of the Dar Hassan Pacha area

General information
- Architectural style: Neo-Renaissance
- Location: Algiers, Algeria
- Completed: 1791

Dar Hassan Pacha is an 18th-century palace located in the Casbah of Algiers, Algeria. It was built in 1791 and used to belong to Hassan III Pasha, who signed a treaty with the US September 5, 1795. After 1830, it became the winter residence of the French Governor of Algiers, and was completely remodelled in 1839, when the entrance was changed and a new façade was added.

== See also ==
- Casbah of Algiers
- Palace of the Dey
- People's Palace (Algiers)
