= Memorial to the Liberation of Algeria =

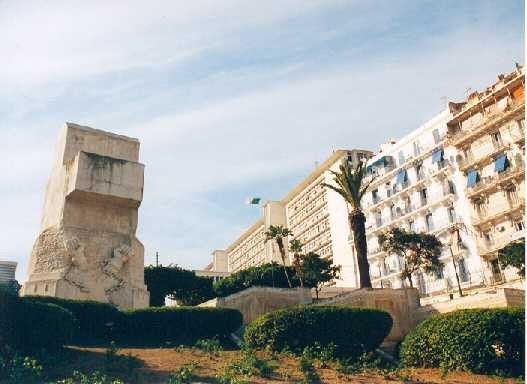
The Memorial (left) with the Government Palace in the background

The Memorial to the Liberation of Algeria is a brutalist monument on Boulevard Mohamed-Khemisti in Algiers. It was designed in 1978 by Algerian visual artist M'hamed Issiakhem, as Algiers was preparing to host the 1978 All-Africa Games. The memorial incorporates an earlier sculpted group from the French colonial era, formerly known as the monument aux morts or Le Pavois (referring to a shield used to carry somebody on high), no longer visible but still extant beneath a concrete casing.

== History ==
Le Pavois was designed by architects Maurice Gras et Édouard Monestès and sculptors Paul Landowski and Charles Bigonet, winners of the public design competition in 1920, and inaugurated on 11 November 1928. It featured a winged Victory evoking Marianne between a French poilu and an Algerian spahi, all three on horseback and together holding a shield (French: pavois) on which rests the body of a fallen World War I combatant. Additional figures included two women and two old men on the monument's back, intended to symbolize the emotional ties between the diverse communities of French Algeria.

Issiakhem's design was a conscious endeavor to preserve the French colonial monument, which also honored the suffering of Algerian fighters, while removing it from public view.

== See also ==
- Martyrs' Memorial, Algiers
- Monuments aux Morts
