= Geronimo (martyr) =

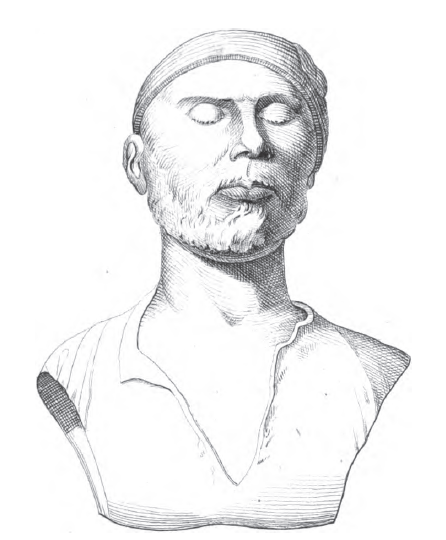
Venerable Geronimo by Adrien Berbrugger (1859)

The alleged finding of human remains, designated San Geronimo, in 1853 was regarded as confirming of an incident recorded by a Spanish Benedictine named Diego de Haedo, who published a topographical history of Algiers in 1612. Haedo sets forth the legend that a young Arab who had embraced Christianity and had been baptized with the name of Geronimo (Jerome) was captured by a Moorish corsair in 1569 and taken to Algiers.

The Arabs endeavoured to induce Geronimo to renounce Christianity, but as he steadfastly refused to do so, he was condemned to death. Bound hand and foot, he was thrown alive into a mould in which a block of concrete was about to be made. The block containing his body was built into an angle of the Fort of the Twenty-four Hours, then under construction. According to Samuel M. Zwemer, in 1853 the Fort of the Twenty-four Hours was demolished, and, in the very angle specified by Haedo, the skeleton of Geronimo was found. The bones were interred at St. Philippe, now the Ketchaoua Mosque. Liquid plaster of Paris was run into the mould left by the saint's body, creating a perfect model showing the features of the youth, the cords which bound him, and even the texture of his clothing. This model was said to be held in the museum formerly at Parc du Galland, Mustapha Superior, Algiers.
