= Government Palace (Algiers) =

Office of the Prime Minister of Algeria

Coordinates: 36.7746°N 3.0566°E

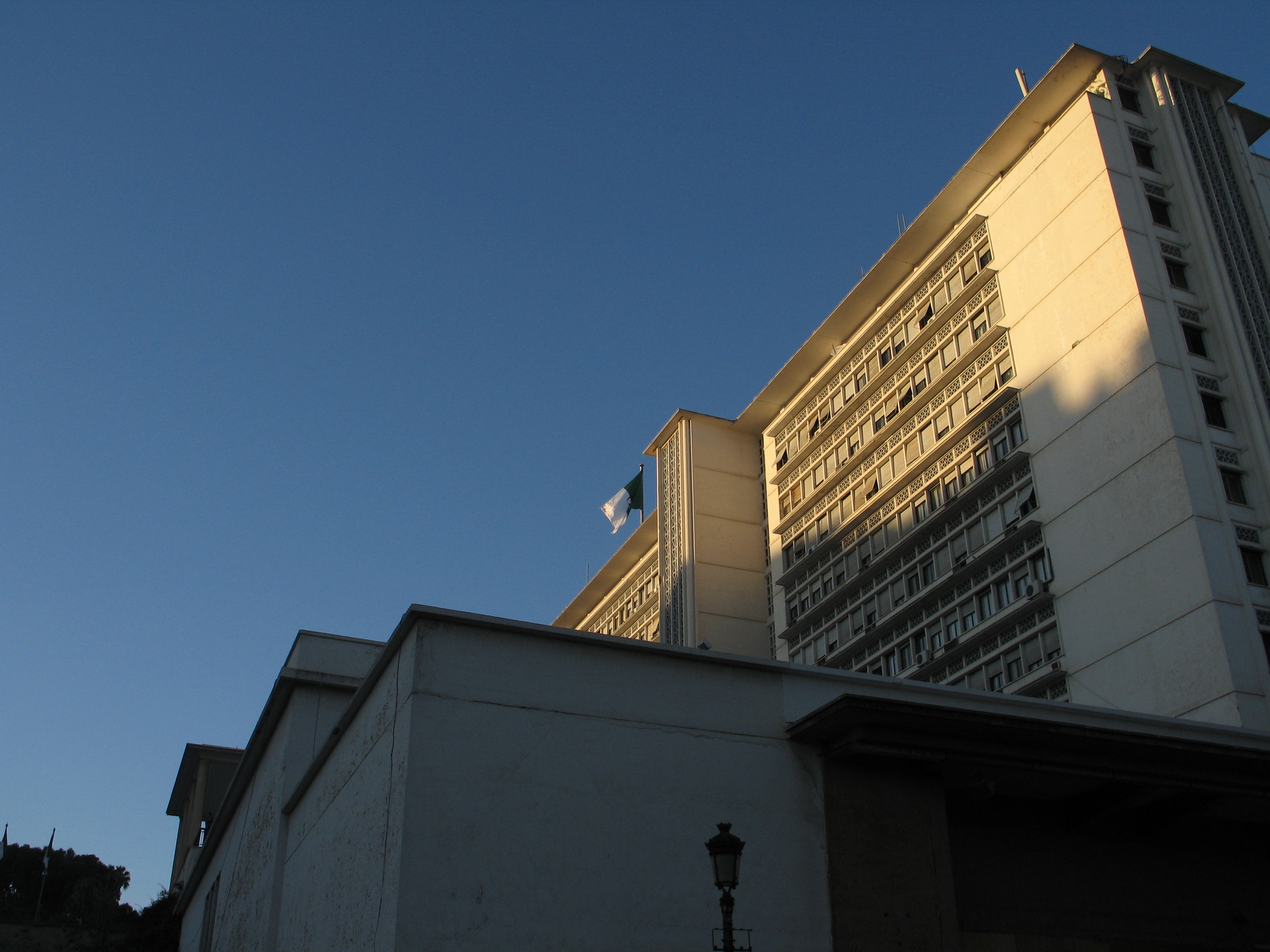
The palace in 2006

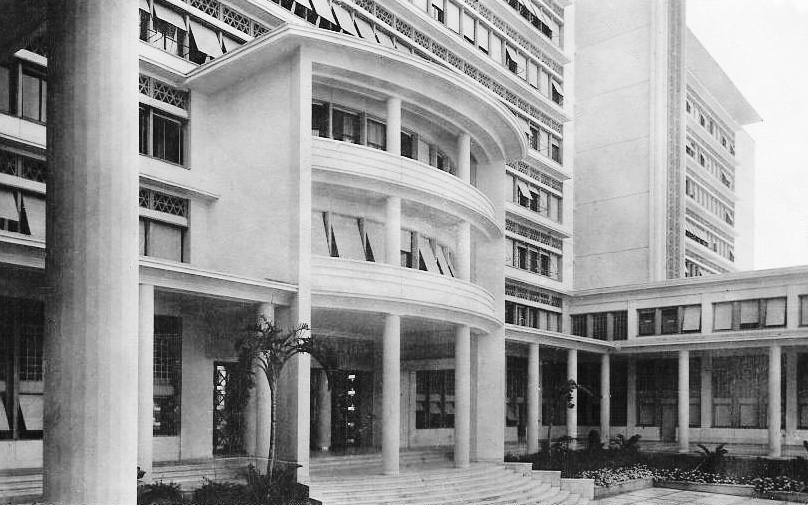
View from the southwest with the Palace's balcony, early 1930s

The Government Palace (Arabic: قصر الحكومة, French: Palais du Gouvernement), known before 1962 as Gouvernement général, is the office of the Prime Minister of Algeria and a major public building in Algiers. At the time of its inauguration in 1933, with a surface of 33,000 m^{2}, it was the largest administrative building of the entire French state.

== History ==
The project to build a new seat for the government of French Algeria was formulated in the context of the 100th anniversary of the Invasion of Algiers in 1830. The complex was built between 1929 and 1934 on a design by architect Jacques Guiauchain, the grandson of one of French Algeria's first colonial architects, Pierre Auguste Guiauchain, and eventually inaugurated in 1933. It encloses an entertainment and cinema venue, the salle des fêtes, which was built in 1929 and is now named after Ibn Khaldun.

The building was ransacked by a mob on 13 May 1958, during the May 1958 crisis. On 4 June 1958, newly arrived Prime Minister of France Charles de Gaulle gave a major speech from the Government Palace's balcony, where he uttered the ambiguous sentence that immediately became iconic, Je vous ai compris ("I have understood you").

After the country's independence in 1962 following the Algerian War, the building became the office and residence of the Prime Minister of Algeria. It is also the home of the Algerian Ministry of the Interior and Local Communities.

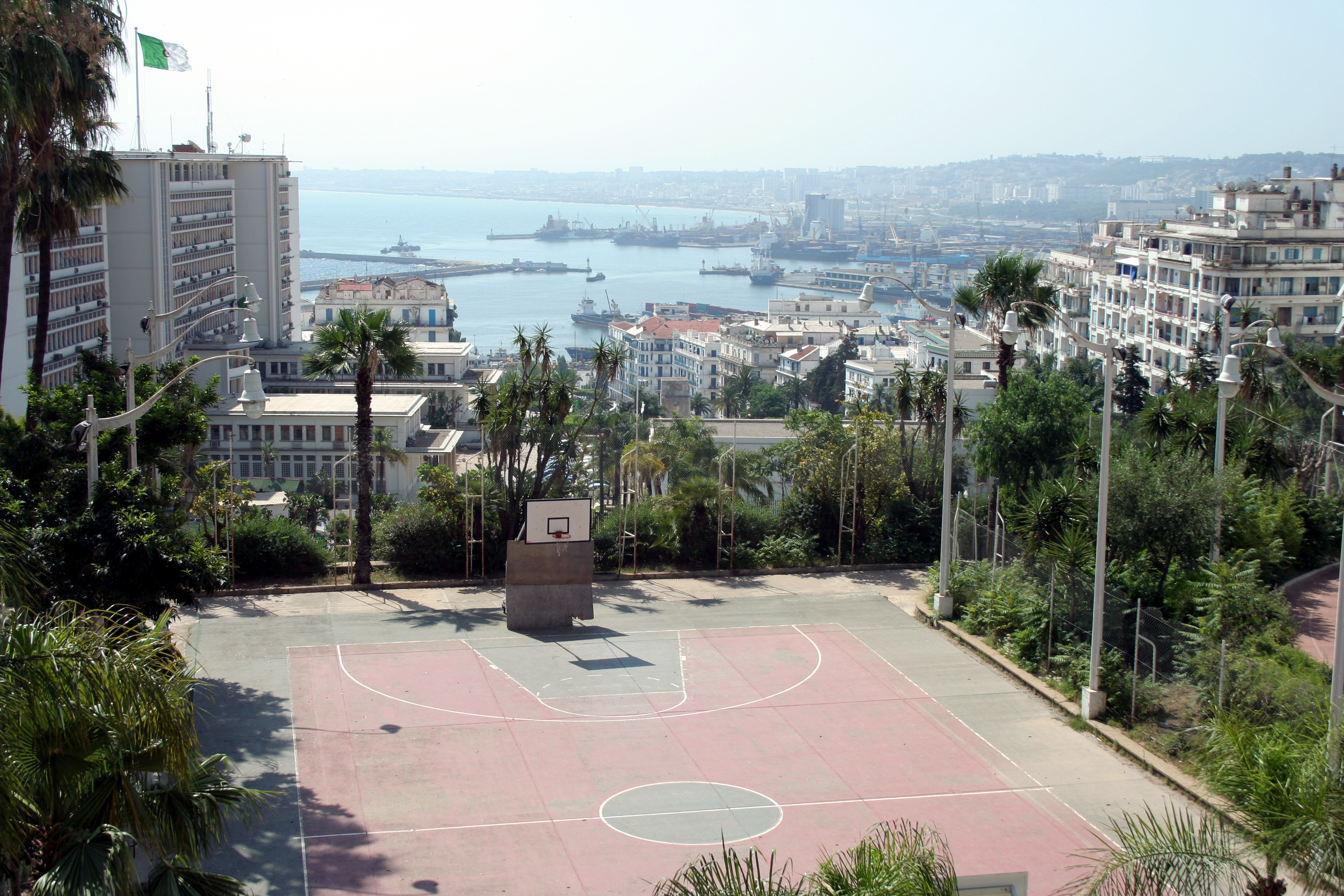
View from Boulevard Frantz-Fanon, with Government Palace on left

== Urban setting ==
The Government Palace crowns the Boulevard Mohamed-Khemisti, a monumental perspective created in the early 20th century on former military grounds, which also includes the Grande Poste d'Alger. The plaza or Forum in front of the Government Palace, formerly an open space but now closed to the public, overlooks Algiers with a broad view towards the sea. Bordering that forum is also the Central Library Arts And Culture, a public library. Just below it, in a public garden, stands the Memorial to the Liberation of Algeria.

== See also ==
- People's National Assembly building (Algiers)
- Palace of the Council of the Nation (Algiers)
- People's Palace (Algiers)
- El Mouradia Palace
