= Khelifa Boukhalfa Station =

Station of the Algiers Metro

Khelifa Boukhalfa
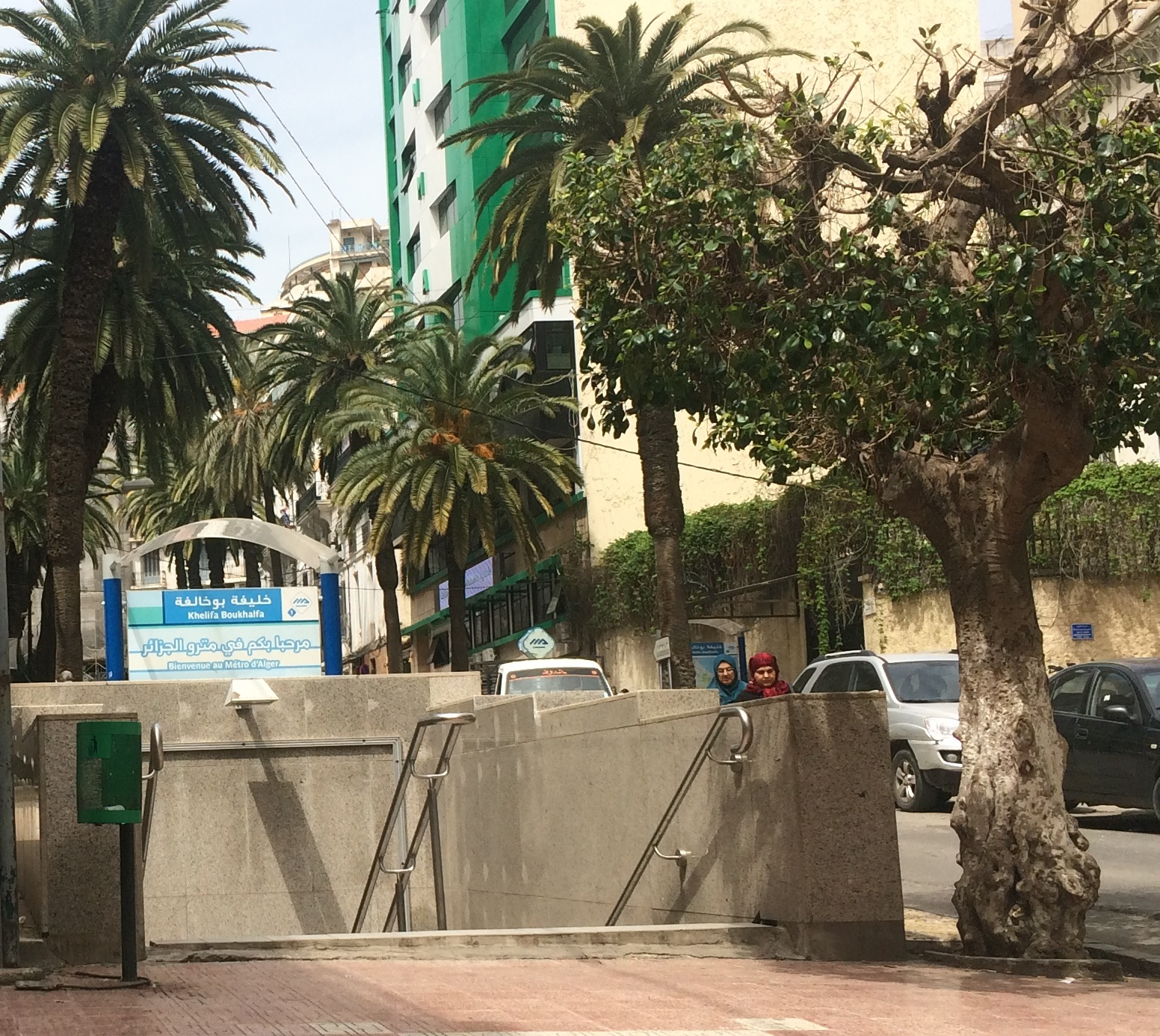

General information
- Location: Sidi M'Hamed
- Coordinates: 36°45′59″N 3°03′13″E
- Line: Line 1
- Platforms: 2 side platforms at each line
- Tracks: 2 per line
- Connections: ETUSA 31, 32, 33, 40, 54

Construction
- Accessible: yes

Other information
- Station code: KBK

History
- Opened: November 1, 2011 (Line 1)

Services
| Preceding station | Algiers Metro | Following station |
|---|---|---|
| Tafourah - Grande Poste towards Place des Martyrs | Line 1 | 1er Mai towards El Harrach Centre |
Location

Khelifa Boukhalfa is a transfer station serving the Line 1 of the Algiers Metro.

== Etymology ==
The Khelifa Boukhalfa station is located under the Boukhalfa Boulevard at the intersection of Mouloud-Belhouchet Boulevard, near the Didouche-Mourad Street and Rue Victor Hugo. It serves the neighborhoods located upstream of the place Maurice Audin-(Didouche-Mourad Mohamed V street and boulevard), the district of Cathédrale du Sacré-Cœur d'Alger and the neighborhood Messonnier.

The station is named after an Algerian fighter Algerian War died in Algiers on 17 December 1957.
