= Tafourah - Grande Poste (Algiers Metro) =

Station of the Algiers Metro

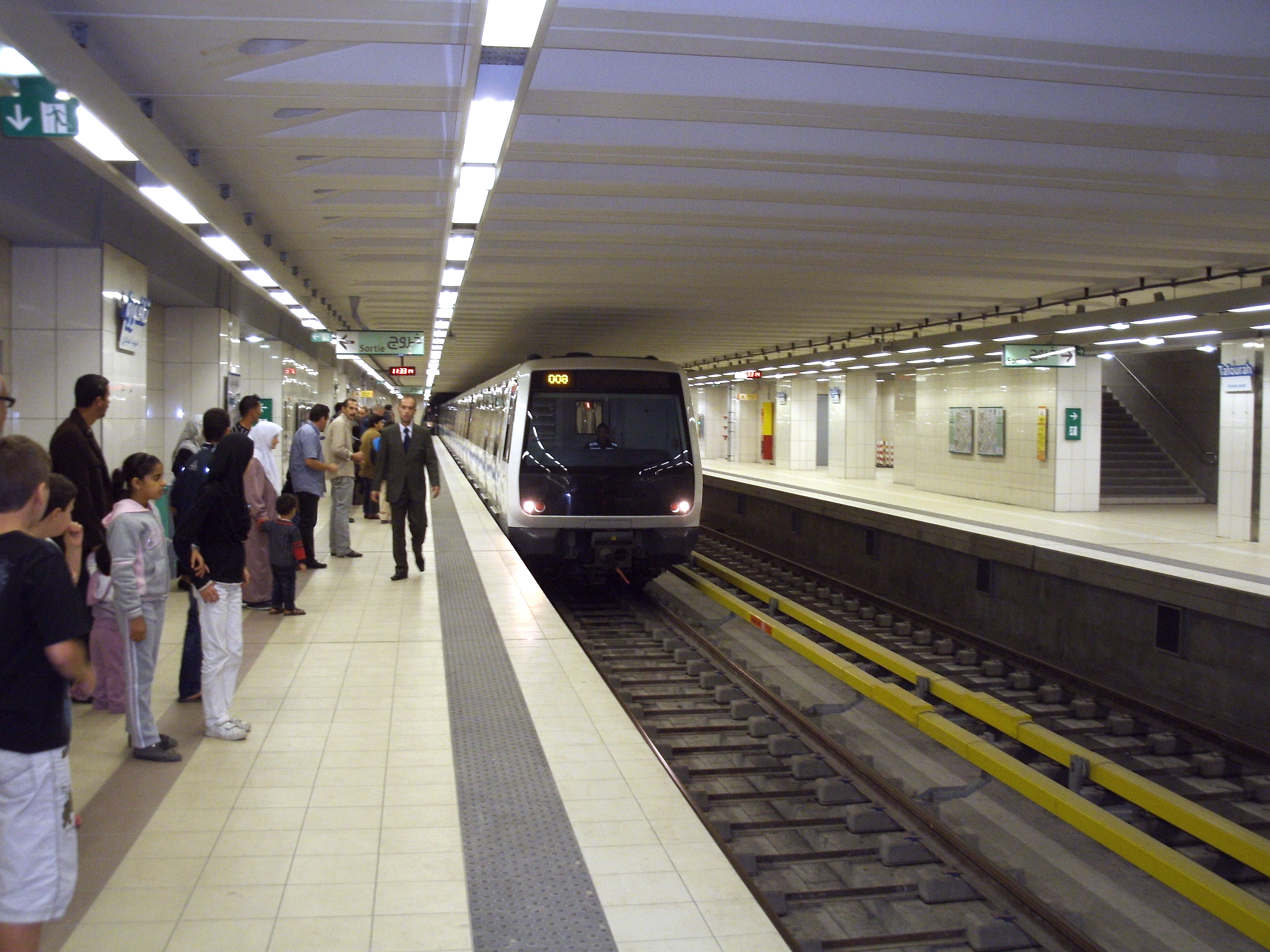
- Tafourah - Grande Poste station on the Line 1.

General information
- Location: Grande Poste Algiers
- Coordinates: 36°46′19″N 3°03′29″E
- Line: Line 1
- Platforms: 2 side platforms at each line
- Tracks: 2 per line
- Connections: ETUSA 15, 37, 40, 43, 100

Construction
- Accessible: yes

Other information
- Station code: TGP

History
- Opened: November 1, 2011 (Line 1)

Services
Preceding station	Algiers Metro	Following station
Ali Boumendjel towards Place des Martyrs	Line 1	Khelifa Boukhalfa towards El Harrach Centre
Location

Tafourah - Grande Poste is a transfer station serving the Line 1 of the Algiers Metro.

== Etymology ==
The Tafourah station - Grande Poste is located in El Khettabi Boulevard near the Grande Poste d'Alger.

The northern exits of the station provide access to the main post office on Boulevard Mohamed-Khemisti and the street Larbi Ben Me Hidi. The south exits giving access to the central power of the University of Algiers.
