= Dar Mustapha Pacha =

Coordinates: 36°47′08″N 3°03′39″E

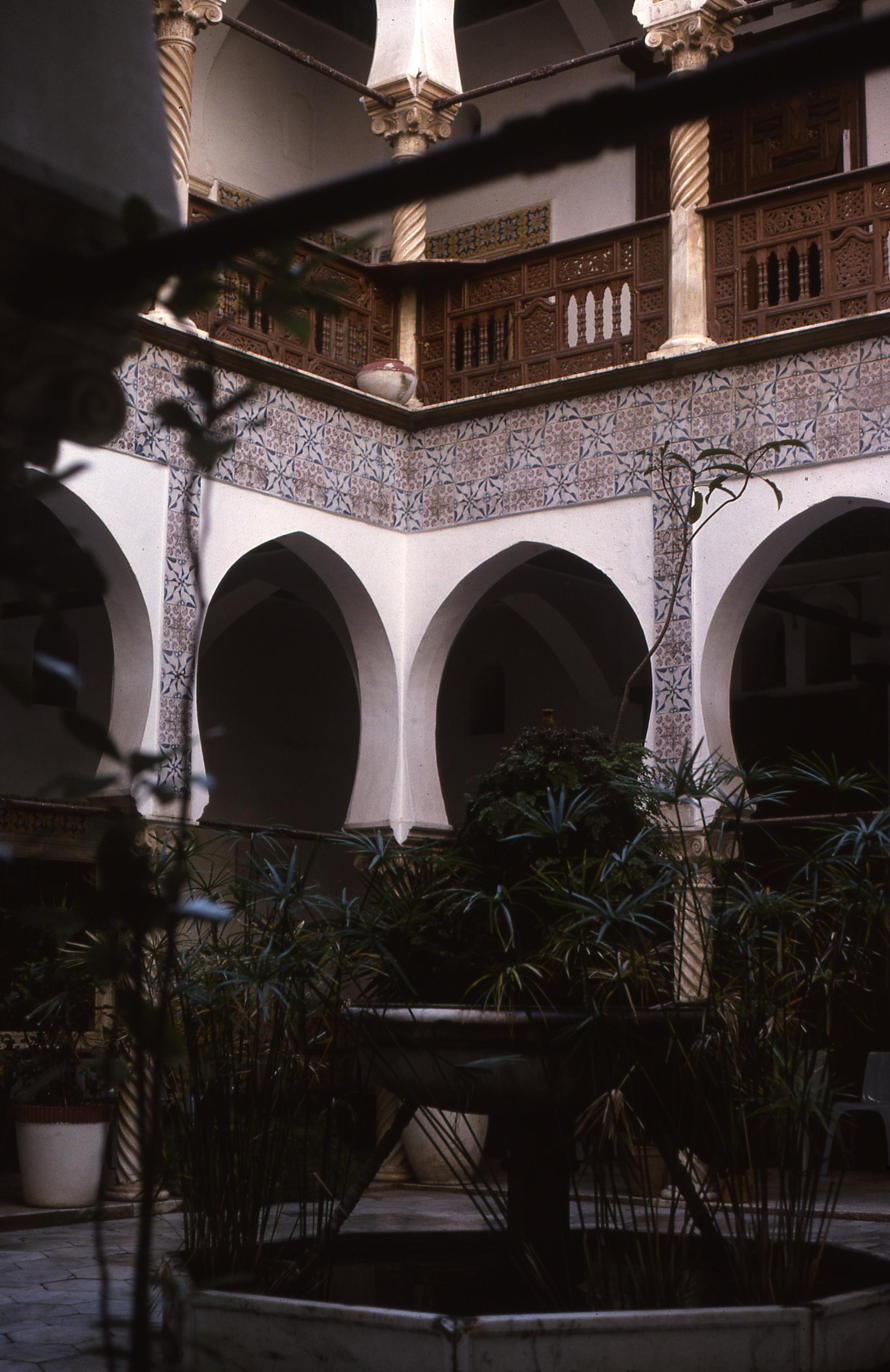
- Interactive map of the Dar Mustapha Pacha area

General information
- Architectural style: Moorish
- Location: Algiers, Algeria
- Construction started: 1798
- Completed: 1799

Dar Mustapha Pacha (French: Palais Mustapha Pacha) is a Moorish palace, located in the Casbah of Algiers, Algiers, Algeria. It houses the National Museum of Miniatures, Illumination and Calligraphy.

It was built by the future Dey Mustapha Pacha between 1798 and 1799. The main entrance to the palace is situated at No. 12 Ahmad and Muhammad Mecheri Street, under a projecting roof terrace which is bordered by rows of Roman tiles. The main door opens onto a sqifa (entrance hall), which leads to the main courtyard of the palace. The courtyard is sheltered with groined vaults and is dispersed with decorative niches which form window-seat benches. There is also a second entrance hall which is overlooked by two marble-framed doors; this connects the main sqifa used by visitors to enter the interior courtyard. The centre of the residential quarters is surrounded by galleries and supported by arches which rest on marble columns and are distinguished by decorative tiles. The ceilings are supported by wooden beams which cover the galleries on the ground floor and the first floor of the palace.

== See also ==
- Casbah of Algiers
