= Dar Aziza =

Coordinates: 36°47′06″N 3°03′41″E

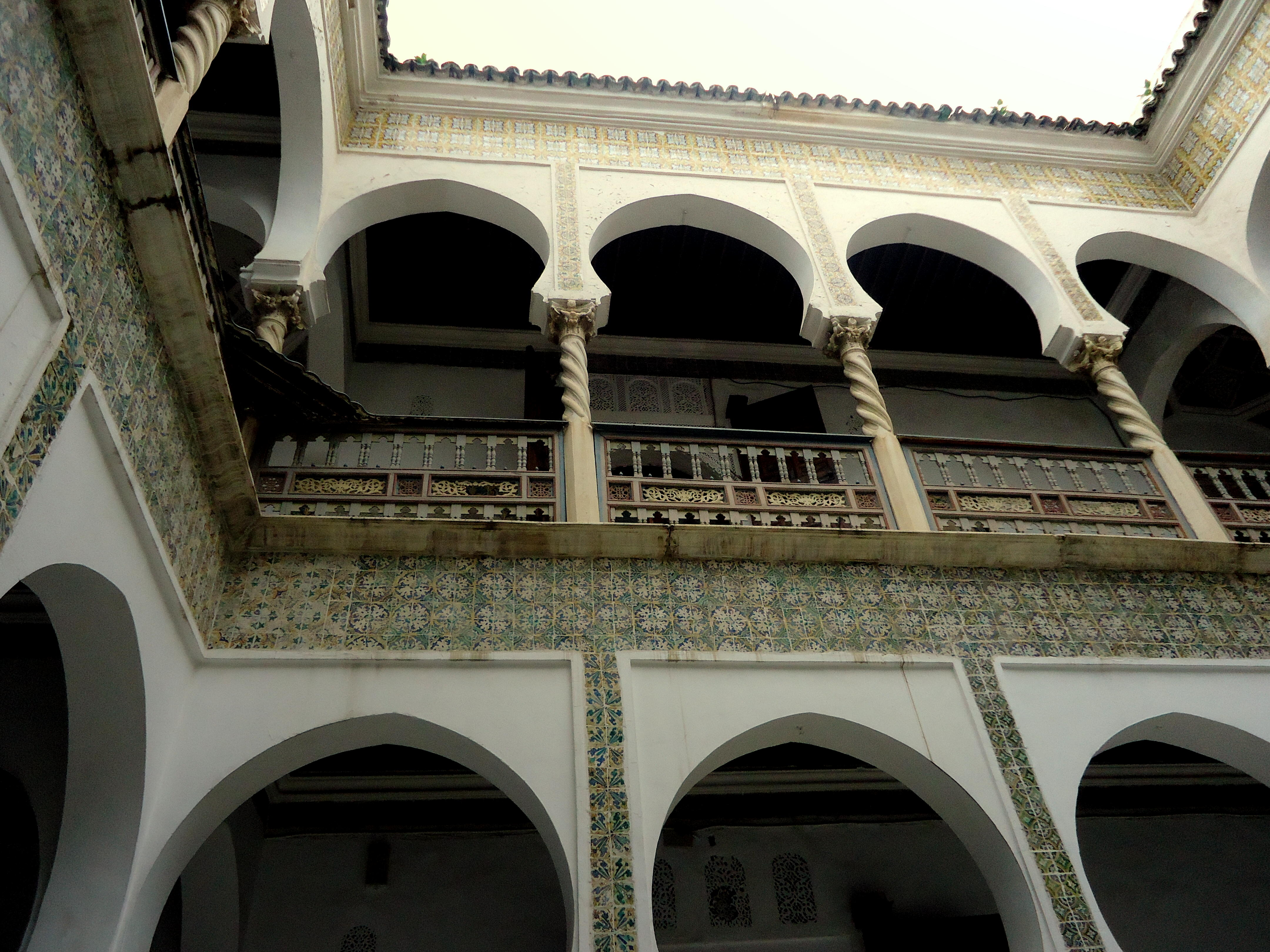
- Interactive map of the Dar Aziza area

General information
- Architectural style: Moorish
- Location: Algiers, Algeria

Dar Aziza is a 16th-century Moorish palace located in the Casbah of Algiers in Algeria. Today, it houses the National Agency of Archaeology and Protection of Historic Sites and Monuments. Dar Aziza, arguably the most iconic surviving building of its era in Algiers, was part of a large governmental compound known as Janina Palace, which existed before the arrival of Turkish corsairs.

== History ==
Dar Aziza was part of a large governmental compound known as Janina Palace, which existed before the arrival of Turkish corsairs. It is believed to have been built at some time in the 16th century, though its surrounding environment was significantly modified after the advent of French colonial rule. In the Ottoman period, it would have served to lodge foreign embassies and, in particular, the Fathers of the Order of Mercy who came to negotiate the redemption of Christian captives. According to a 1721 document, the building had three floors before losing one in the 1716 earthquake. According to Henri Klein, this palace was given by the Dey (probably Dey Hussein) to his daughter Aziza on the occasion of her marriage to the Bey of Constantine.

In 1818, Hussein Dey left Jenina Palace for the more secure Palace of the Dey on a high location dominating the Casbah of Algiers. In 1838, after the French conquest, Dar Aziza became the residence of the Bishop of Algiers and then the archbishopric of Algiers due to its position in front of the cathedral. It was described by the Louis-Antoine-Augustin Pavy as a "jewel of oriental architecture" and was classified as a historic monument in 1887. The other buildings of Janina Palace were largely demolished in 1856 by the French colonial authorities.

Since 1962, the palace has been occupied successively by the Ministry of Tourism, the Ethaqafa magazine and now by the National Agency of Archaeology and Protection of Historic Sites and Monuments.

== Architecture ==
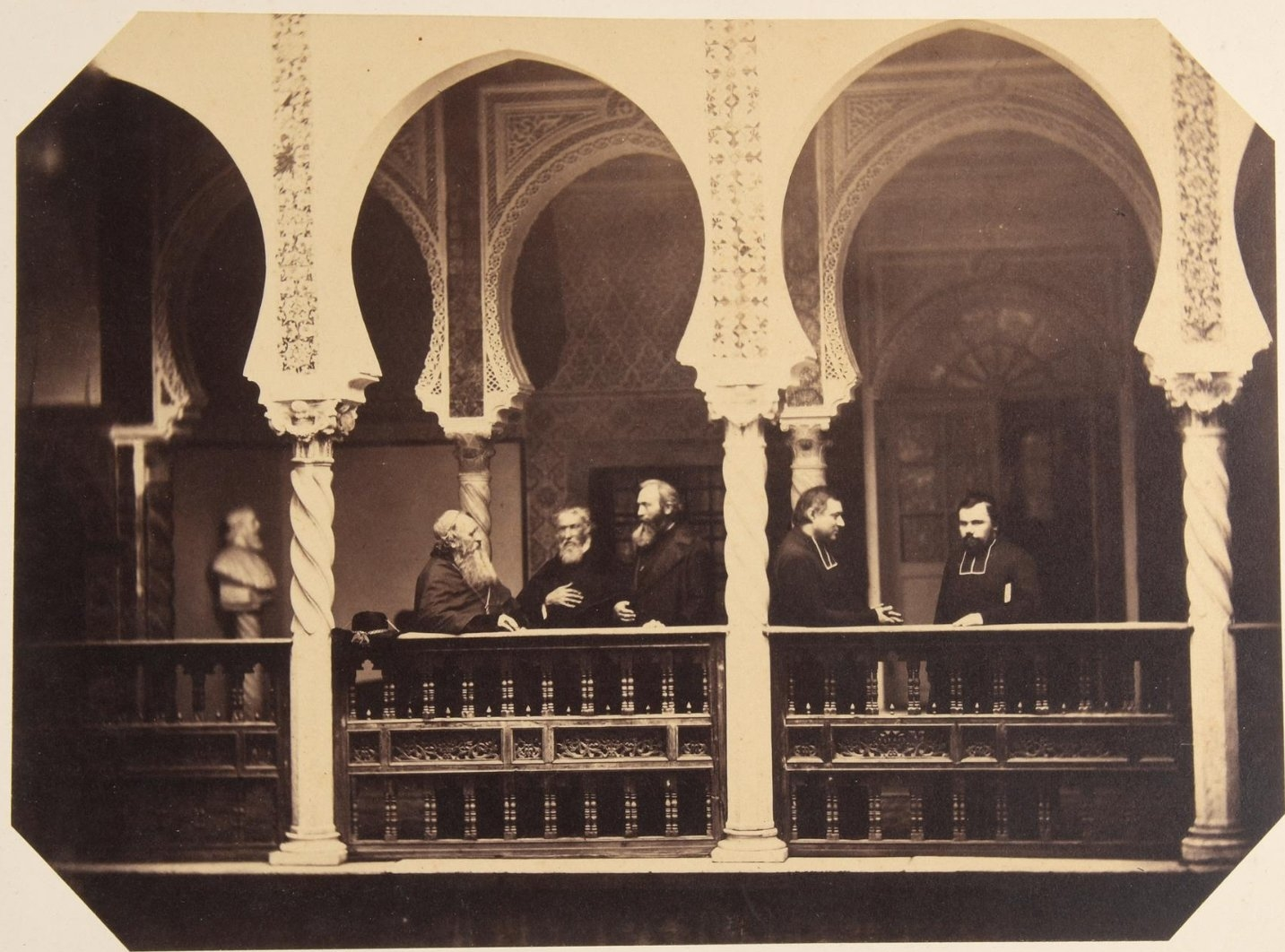
The upper galleries between 1856 and 1857

The palace was originally on a sloping site and had several stories. Its original ground floor, somewhat like a basement, contained storerooms, kitchens, stables, and shops along its exterior, but these have since disappeared and the floor above it has become the ground floor. The main building is a two-story structure centered around an internal square courtyard (the wast ad-dar or 'center of the house'). The courtyard is ringed on all four sides by a two-story gallery with pointed horseshoe arches supported on marble columns. Diverse ceramic tiles, carved stucco, lattice windows, and a fountain are used for decoration, with the decoration generally increasing in richness on the upper level. The rooms of the upper story are also grander and included the main reception hall. A grand staircase leads from the floor of this courtyard to an annex, the dwira (also transliterated as douira, meaning a smaller house or apartment), which was partly demolished in the 19th century. The grand staircase itself is unusual in North African domestic architecture of this period and suggests that the builders may have been familiar with European architecture.
