= Palace of the Dey =

Dey Palace
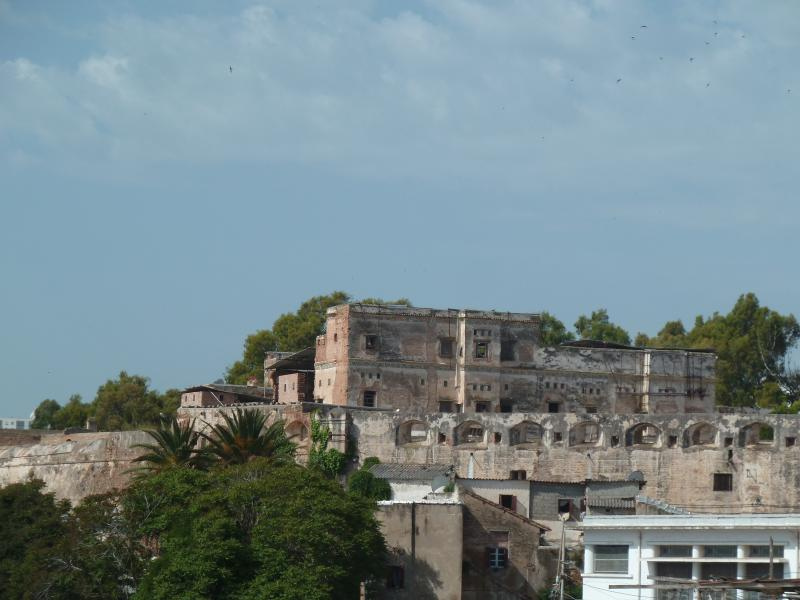
- View of the Dey Palace in 2012
- Interactive map of the Dey Palace area

General information
- Architectural style: Moorish, Ottoman and European
- Location: Algiers, Algeria
- Construction started: 16th-century
- Client: Deys of Algiers
- Owner: Algerian state

Website

UNESCO World Heritage Site
- Part of: Casbah of Algiers
- Criteria: Cultural: ii, v
- Reference: 565
- Inscription: 1992 (16th Session)

Palace of the Dey (Arabic: قصر الداي), also known as Algiers Castle (Arabic: قلعة الجزائر), is an Ottoman era palace in the city of Algiers, Algeria. Completed in the 16th century, it is situated inside the Casbah of Algiers, and settled by successive deys of the city. It once was the second largest palace in the Ottoman Empire, next to Topkapi Palace in Istanbul.

== History ==
The palace became the seat of government of the Regency of Algiers in 1818, when Hussein Dey left Janina Palace for its more secure position. Hussein Dey had lived in the palace for 12 years. The palace witnessed the so-called "Fan Incident" in 1827 which became the indirect cause of the French declaration of war against Algeria.

== Architecture ==
It is a fusion of several architectural styles, namely Moorish, Ottoman and European. The building consists of three floors with rectangle courtyard in the middle surrounded by suites, apartments, kitchens and hamams. Other facilities of the palace including two mosques, a diwan (public room), and an armory. The building was decorated by the Hispano-Moresque ware originated from Andalucia and popularized in Tunisia in the 15th century.

== Condition ==
Although renovations has been conducted in 1979, 1989 and 2006, the palace still suffers from damages which lead to collapse of and major cracks on the wooden parts of the building. The collapse and cracks were resulting from the environment of the building where surrounded by the busy roads. Algerian government has been initiating an international team to conduct even more extensive renovation.

== Gallery ==
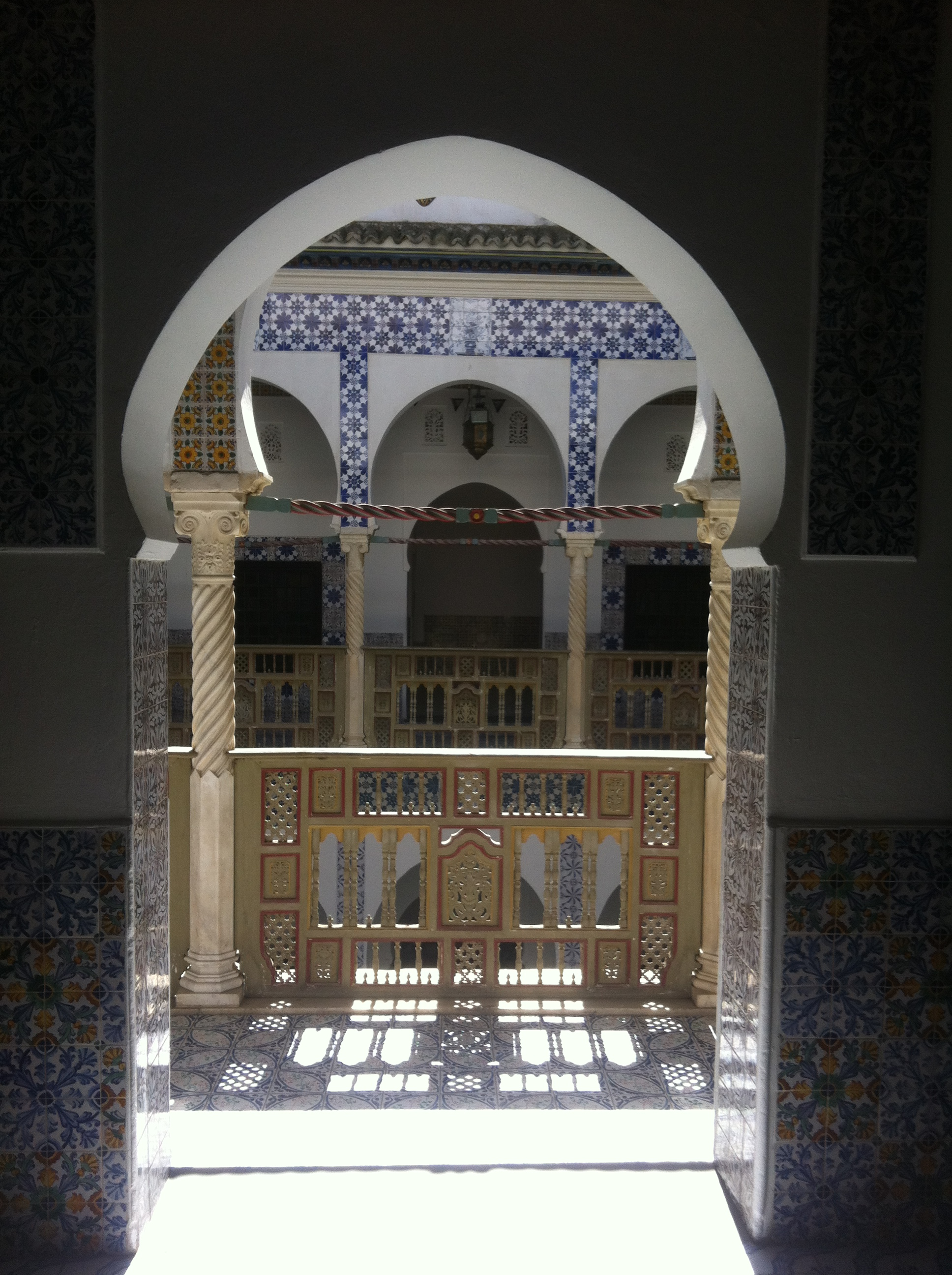
Interior

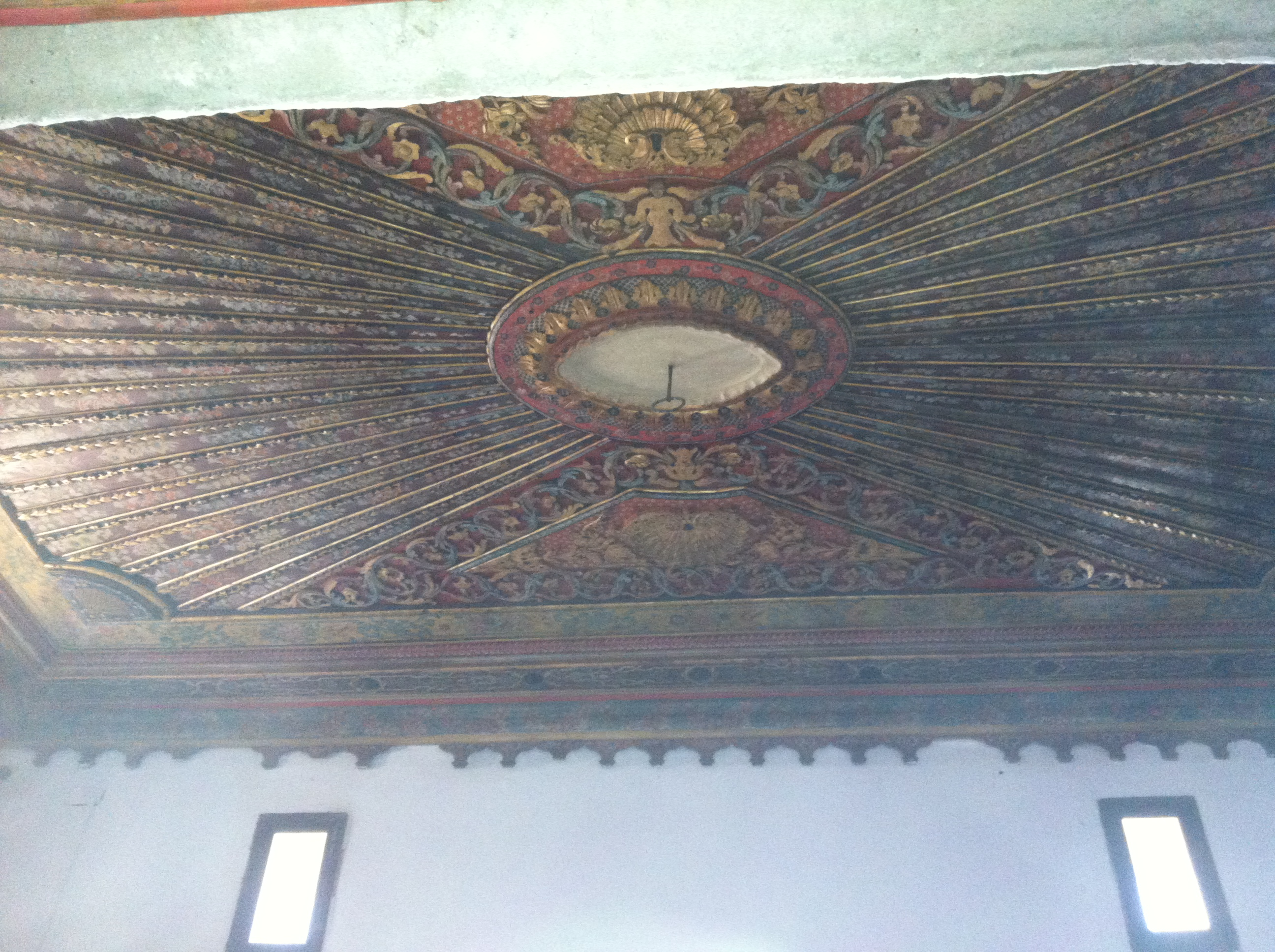
Ceiling

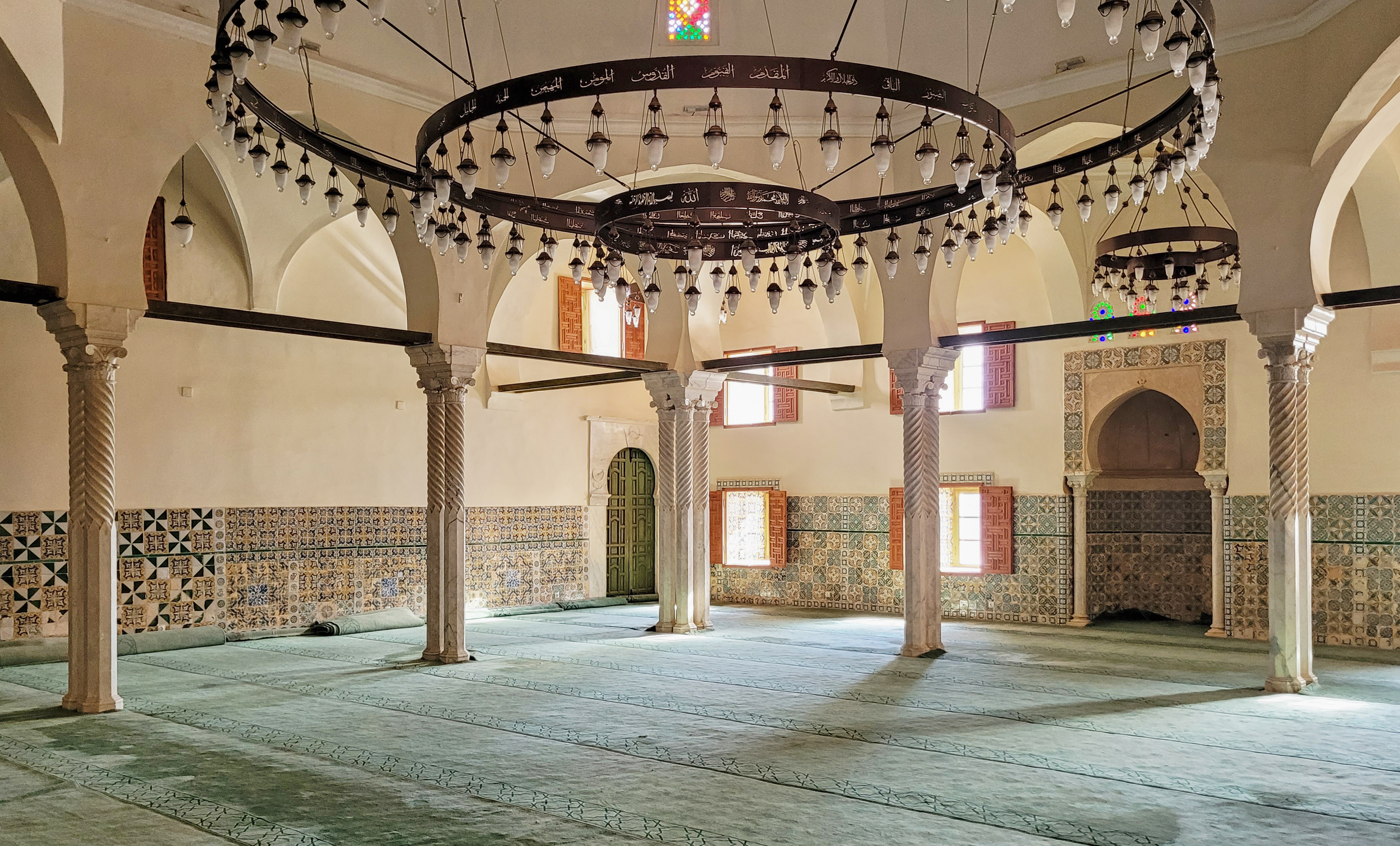
Dey's Mosque

== Bibliography ==
- Broussaud, (général), Les carreaux de faïence peints dans l’Afrique du Nord, Paris : Librairie Plon, « Collection du centenaire de l’Algérie », 1930
- Marçais, G., L’architecture musulmane d’occident, Tunisie, Algérie, Espagne et Sicile, Paris : Arts et Métiers Graphiques, 1957 « Le palais du Dey d’Alger, splendeur et décadence » in Algeriantourism
