= History of the Jews in Algeria =

Algerian Jews
יהדות אלג'יריה يهود الجزائر
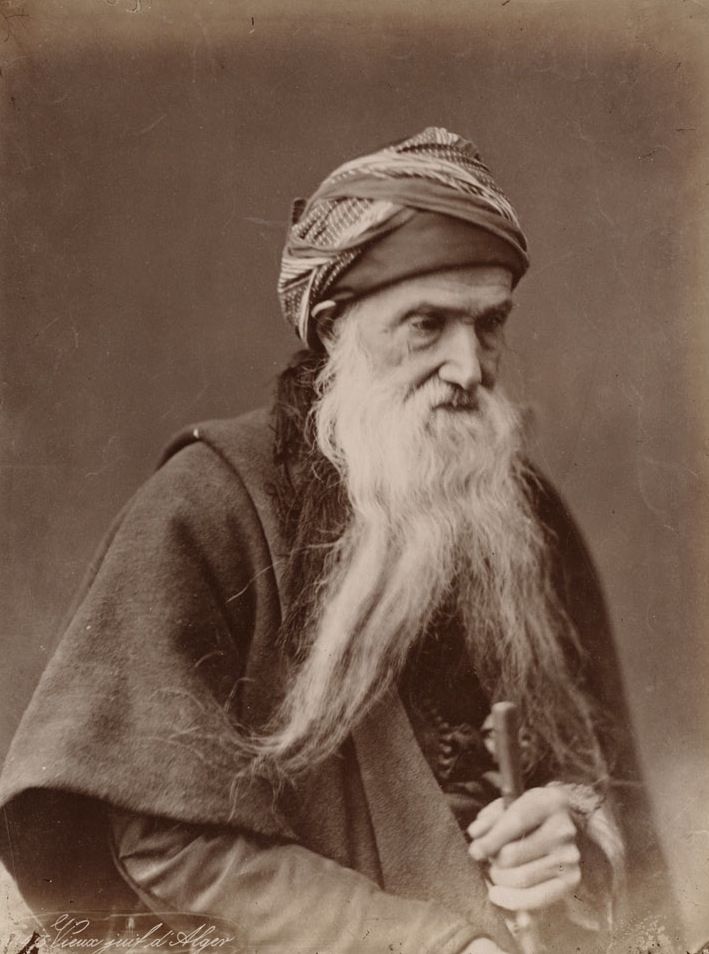
- Algerian Jew (1892).

Total population
- 200 (2025)

Regions with significant populations
- Algiers, France, Canada, United States

Languages
- Arabic, Judeo-Algerian Arabic, French, Berber, Tetuani Ladino

Religion
- Judaism

Related ethnic groups
- Jews (Maghrebi Jews, Sephardi Jews)

The history of Jews in Algeria goes back to antiquity, although it is not possible to trace with any certainty the time and circumstances of the arrival of the first Jews in what is now Algeria. (Note: French: La graphie « Juifs » (avec une capitale) désigne les membres d'une identité nationale ou ethnique. La graphie « juifs » (sans capitale) désigne les pratiquants de la religion juive. Voir à ce propos les articles Juifs et Usage des majuscules en français. English: The spelling "Jews" (with a capital) designates members of a national or ethnic identity. The spelling "Jews" (without capital) designates practitioners of the Jewish religion. See on this subject the articles Jews and Use of capital letters in French.) In any case, several waves of immigration helped to increase the population. There may have been Jews in Carthage and present-day Algeria before the Roman conquest, but the development of Jewish communities is linked to the Roman presence. Jewish revolts in Judea and Cyrenaica in the 1st and 2nd centuries certainly led to the arrival of Jewish immigrants from these regions. The vast majority of scholarly sources reject the notion that there were any large-scale conversions of Berbers to Judaism.

The Muslim conquest of North Africa, which was completed in Algeria in the 8th century, brought North Africa into the realm of Islamic civilization and had a lasting impact on the identity of local Jewish communities, whose status was henceforth governed by the dhimma.

New immigrants later strengthened the Algerian Jewish community: Jews fled Spain during the Visigothic persecutions of the 5th and 6th centuries, and again during the persecutions linked to the Spanish Reconquista of the 14th and 16th centuries. Many Jews from the Iberian Peninsula settled in Algeria, mixing with the local Jewish population and influencing its traditions. In the 18th century, other Jews, the Granas of Livorno, were few in number, but played a role as commercial intermediaries between Europe and the Ottoman Empire. Later in the 19th century, many Jews from Tetouan arrived in Algeria, strengthening the ranks of the community.

After the French colonization of Algeria in 1830, Algerian Jews, like other Algerians, faced discrimination by the colonial state. Like Muslims, they were given the status of "indigène" (indigenous) and were barred from gaining French citizenship unless particular conditions were met. However, the dhimma was abolished, and Jews became equal to Muslims under French law. Indeed, the Muslim law that governed the country put the former at a distinct disadvantage to the latter, especially in the legal sphere and their treatment as inhabitants of the country. This changed in 1870, with the Crémieux Decree granting Algerian Jews French citizenship (except for Mozabite Jews), while Muslims remained under the second-class indigenous status. Algerian Jews increasingly identified with metropolitan France, and despite a period of forced return to second-class indigenous status during World War II, they opted en masse to be repatriated to France on the eve of Algerian Independence—when even the formerly excluded Mozabite Jews were granted French citizenship—with a minority choosing Israel. This virtually put an end to more than 2,000 years of presence on Algerian soil. A relatively small number of Jews still live in Algeria in the 21st century.

Algerian Jews are unique in that they are the only community of North African Jews that did not overwhelmingly emigrate to Israel during the Jewish exodus from Arab and Muslim countries; instead, the majority of Algerian Jews chose France as their destination. Their "repatriation" represents a unique case in the history of Jewish migration given that even though they were physically uprooted, they "returned" to France as citizens and not as refugees.

== History ==
=== Early Jewish history in Algeria ===
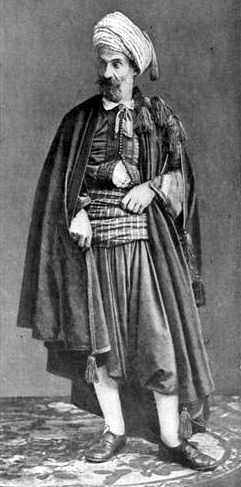
A Jew of Algiers, late 19th century

There is evidence of Jewish settlements in Algeria since at least the Roman period (Mauretania Caesariensis). Epitaphs have been found in archaeological excavations that attest to Jews in the first centuries CE. Berber lands were said to welcome Christians and Jews very early from the Roman Empire. The destruction of the Second Temple in Jerusalem by Titus in 70 CE, and thereafter by the Kitos War in 117, reinforced Jewish settlement in North Africa and the Mediterranean. Early descriptions of the Rustamid capital, Tahert, note that Jews were found there, as they would be in any other major Muslim city of North Africa. Centuries later, the letters found in the Cairo Geniza mention many Algerian Jewish families.

=== Muslim dominance era ===
In the 7th century, Jewish settlements in North Africa were reinforced by Jewish immigrants that came to North Africa after fleeing from the persecutions of the Visigothic king Sisebut and his successors. They escaped to the Maghreb, which was at the time still part of the Byzantine Empire. It is debated whether Jews influenced the Berber population, making converts among them. In that century, Islamic armies conquered the whole Maghreb and most of the Iberian peninsula. The Jewish population was placed under Muslim domination in constant cultural exchanges with Al Andalus and the Near East.

Later many Sephardic Jews were forced to take refuge in Algeria from the persecutions in Spain of Catalonia, Valencia and Balearic Islands in 1391 and the Spanish Inquisition in 1492. Together with the Moriscos, they thronged to the ports of North Africa, and mingled with native Jewish people. Abraham Lévy-Bacrat, a rabbi and one of the Jewish refugees from the 1492 expulsion from Spain, recorded that around 12,000 Jews arrived in the Kingdom of Tlemcen in what is today northwestern Algeria. In the 16th century there were large Jewish communities in places such as Oran, Bejaïa and Algiers. Jews were also present in the cities of the interior, such as Tlemcen and Constantine, and as far as Touggourt and M'zab in the south, with the permission of the Muslim authorities. Some Jews in Oran preserved Ladino language—which was a uniquely conservative dialect of Spanish—until the 19th century.

The fear of Spanish invasions in the 18th century caused Jews in Algeria to face potential expulsion and confiscation of property, similar to what had occurred in Spain.

Jewish merchants did well financially in late Ottoman Algiers. The French attack on Algeria was provoked by the Dey's demands that the French government pay its large outstanding wheat debts to two Jewish merchants. Between the 16th and 17th centuries, richer Jews from Livorno in Italy started settling in Algeria. Commercial trading and exchanges between Europe and the Ottoman Empire reinforced the Jewish community. Later again in the 19th century, many Sephardic Jews from Tetouan settled in Algeria, creating new communities, particularly in Oran.

On the eve of the conquest of 1830, Algerian Judaism was as far removed culturally from the France of the Enlightenment as Islam. Three features characterise this distance.

The first is civilisational. Algerian Judaism, and more broadly North African Judaism, is a traditional Judaism that bases its social and religious order not only on the law of God and rabbinical teaching, but also on a foundation of values, beliefs, and practices common to all North African ethnic groups. The centuries-long cohabitation with Islam has given rise to an original culture, as evidenced by the Judeo-Arabic language, fertility rituals, and the practice of maraboutism.

The second characteristic is institutional. Submission to the Muslim sovereign had one major consequence for community organisation: independence. Indeed, the dhimma pact, which gave Jews the status of protected inferiors, granted - apart from its very restrictive aspects - almost total freedom to the communities in the management of their worship. Each community (independently of the others) was free to manage its own resources, appoint its own rabbis, keep civil records, and maintain its religious infrastructure (synagogues, ritual baths, cemeteries).

Finally, the third determining factor is social and political. Community independence and extreme poverty resulted in a clannish organisation of Jewish society. The need to be represented before the Muslim sovereign stimulated competition between the large families and clientelism.

=== French Algeria ===
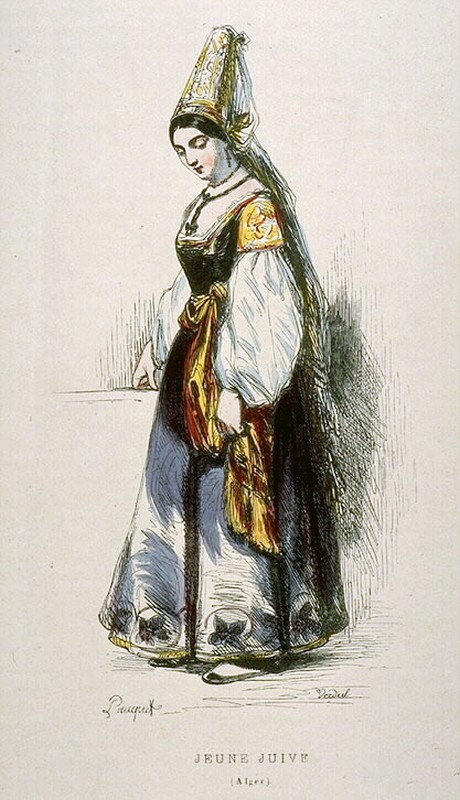
Algerian Jewish woman wearing a Sarma, 1841

In 1830, the Jewish population of Algeria was estimated at 26,000 mostly congregated in the coastal area. As a frontier population, natural intermediaries between Europeans and Muslims and fluent in Arabic, Jews were recruited as a priority to accompany French troops in the operations of conquest. Some Algerian Jews aided in the conquest, serving as interpreters or suppliers. However sympathetic some Algerian Jews were to the conqueror, the first priority was to subjugate the ‘indigenous’ populations. In this respect, the Jews were no exception.

Although Ottoman subjection had been abolished with the conquest and annexation by France, they did not enjoy the rights of French citizens because they had a specific personal legal status of religious origin. Until the decree of 1870, the legal status of the Jews of Algeria was hardly different from that of Muslims. The Act of Capitulation of 5 July 1830 guaranteed the "inhabitants of Algeria", whether Muslims or Jews, freedom of worship and respect for their religious traditions. In other words, Algerian Jews remained subject to the jurisdiction of the rabbis, in accordance with Mosaic law. More specifically, the natives of Algeria had the status of French citizens by virtue of the general principles of international law applied to cases of annexation. However, to avoid any confusion and for fear of giving too much weight and rights to this status, the ruling specifies that the natives do not enjoy the rights of French citizens due to the maintenance of their own laws (respect for religion recognised since 1830): "While not being a French citizen, the Muslim or Jewish native is French".

By 1841, the Jewish batei din "religious courts" were placed under French jurisdiction, linked to the Israelite Central Consistory of France. Regional Algerian courts or consistoires were put in place, operating under French oversight.

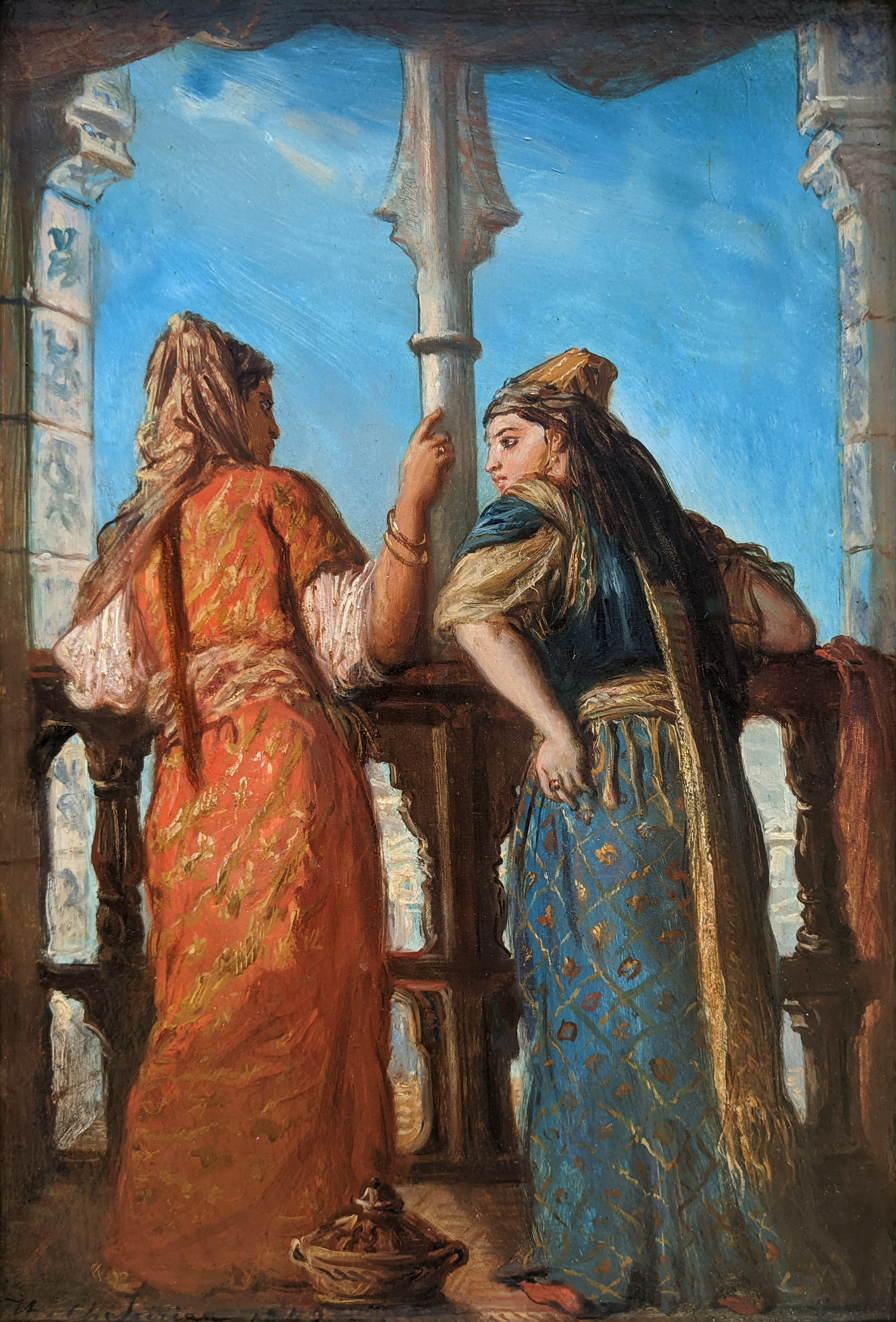
Jewish women at the balcony, Algiers (1849), by Théodore Chassériau, Louvre Museum

On 9 November 1845, the French government organised community worship along metropolitan lines by creating an Algerian Israelite Consistory in Algiers and two provincial consistories, in Oran and Constantine (with metropolitan rabbis), thus completing the legal ‘assimilation’ of Algerian Jews. The creation of consistories would make it possible to achieve two other objectives: firstly, to remove the communities from the authority of the rabbis, considered to be the breeding ground for fanaticism, by entrusting management to a secular and "enlightened" elite; secondly, to break down the clan structure of indigenous society by imposing a single authority.

In 1845, the French colonial government reorganized communal structure, appointing French Jews, who were Ashkenazi Jews, as chief rabbis for each region, with the duty "to inculcate unconditional obedience to the laws, loyalty to France, and the obligation to defend it". Such oversight was an example of the French Jews' attempt to "civilize" Jewish Algerians, as they believed their European traditions were superior to Sephardic practices.

This marked a change in the Jewish relationship with the state. They were separated from the Muslim court system, where they had previously been classified as dhimmis. As a result, Algerian Jews resisted those French Jews attempting to settle in Algeria; in some cases, there was rioting, in others the local Jews refused to allow French Jewish burials in Algerian Jews' cemeteries. In 1865, the Senatus-Consulte liberalized rules of citizenship, to allow Jewish and Muslim "indigenous" peoples in Algeria to become French citizens if they requested it. Few did so, however, because French citizenship required renouncing certain traditional mores. The Algerians considered that a kind of apostasy.

In October 1870, Adolphe Crémieux, a lawyer and former minister under the Second Republic, but also President of the Alliance Israélite Universelle, as Minister of Justice in the National Defence government, promulgated the decree that today bears his name. The decree declared the "indigenous Israelites" of the Algerian departments to be French citizens and made them legally subject to the Civil Code. However, the Jews of the Southern Territories, an administrative entity that existed from 1902 to 1957, were "indigenous" subjects subject to ‘local civil status’ (also known as "personal status" or "local status"); as a result, they had no political rights whatsoever. The importance of the decree lies in the massive and compulsory nature of the change in status. That decree met with resistance from hostile Algerian Jewish circles, especially from traditional Algerian rabbis faced with the intrusion of French Judaism.

The French government granted the 'indigenous Israelites' (nothing is said about the explicit definition of the category of 'Israelite', unlike what will later happen under Vichy), who by then numbered some 33,000, French citizenship in 1870 under the Crémieux Decree, while maintaining an inferior status for Muslims who, though technically French nationals, were required to apply for French citizenship and undergo a naturalization process. For this reason, they are sometimes incorrectly categorized as pieds-noirs. The decision to extend citizenship to Algerian Jews was a result of pressures from prominent members of the liberal, intellectual French Jewish community, which considered the North African Jews to be "backward" and wanted to bring them into modernity.

Within a generation, despite initial resistance, most Algerian Jews came to speak French rather than Arabic or Judaeo-Spanish, and they embraced many aspects of French culture. In embracing "Frenchness," the Algerian Jews joined the colonizers, although they were still considered "other" to the French. Although some took on more typically European occupations, "the majority of Jews were poor artisans and shopkeepers catering to a Muslim clientele." Moreover, conflicts between Sephardic Jewish religious law and French law produced contention within the community. They resisted changes related to domestic issues, such as marriage.

The Crémieux decree, which brought so-called ‘indigenous’ Jews into the fold of French citizenship, de facto separated Muslims and Jews on a legal and civic level. The latter, albeit with apparent differences depending on the region, welcomed the French policy of assimilation, into which many threw themselves wholeheartedly, and which accelerated the march towards Westernisation. In everyday life, however, relations were often cordial and even fraternal, with Jews not being assimilated into the colonists and frequently acting as intermediaries between Muslims and Europeans. In the end, the naturalisation decree of October 1870 was a measure devised by the ruling circle of French Judaism. It was in no way the consecration of a de facto state of affairs—namely the spontaneous francization of Algerian Jews—but a measure to encourage them to enter (willingly or by force) into French normality.

After the 1882 conquest of the M'zab, the French government in Algeria legally categorized southern Algerian Jews, like the Muslims, as "indigènes", and thus subject to restricted and decreased rights under the indigénat compared to their northern Jewish counterparts, who were still French citizens under the Crémieux Decree of 1870. In 1881, there were only about 30,000 Mozabite Jews in Southern Algeria. They established, in Southern Algeria, "local civil status" laws, with rabbis overseeing legal issues. The French government recognized Jewish laws pertaining to domestic issues, such as marriage and inheritance. While these laws allowed for Jews to be structured under halakha, it prevented southern Jews from accessing "elite" opportunities, as their indigenous status established them as lesser citizens.

French antisemitism set down strong roots among the expatriate French community in Algeria, where every municipal council was controlled by antisemites, and newspapers were rife with xenophobic attacks on the local Jewish communities. Much of this was encouraged by the French colonial administration, in particular by the militant antisemitic Max Régis. In Algiers when Émile Zola was brought to trial for his defense in an 1898 open letter, J'Accuse...!, of Alfred Dreyfus, sympathy for whom was widespread in the Arabic press, over 158 Jewish owned shops were looted and burned and two Jews were killed, while the army stood by and refused to intervene (see 1898 Algerian riots). Hannah Arendt was to comment later that, "pogroms against Jews in Algeria were carried out not, as it was claimed, by 'backward Arabs' but by 'thoroughly sophisticated officers of the French colonial administration' and by the mayor of Algiers, Max Régis."

Under French rule, some Muslim anti-Jewish riots still occurred, as in 1897 in Oran.

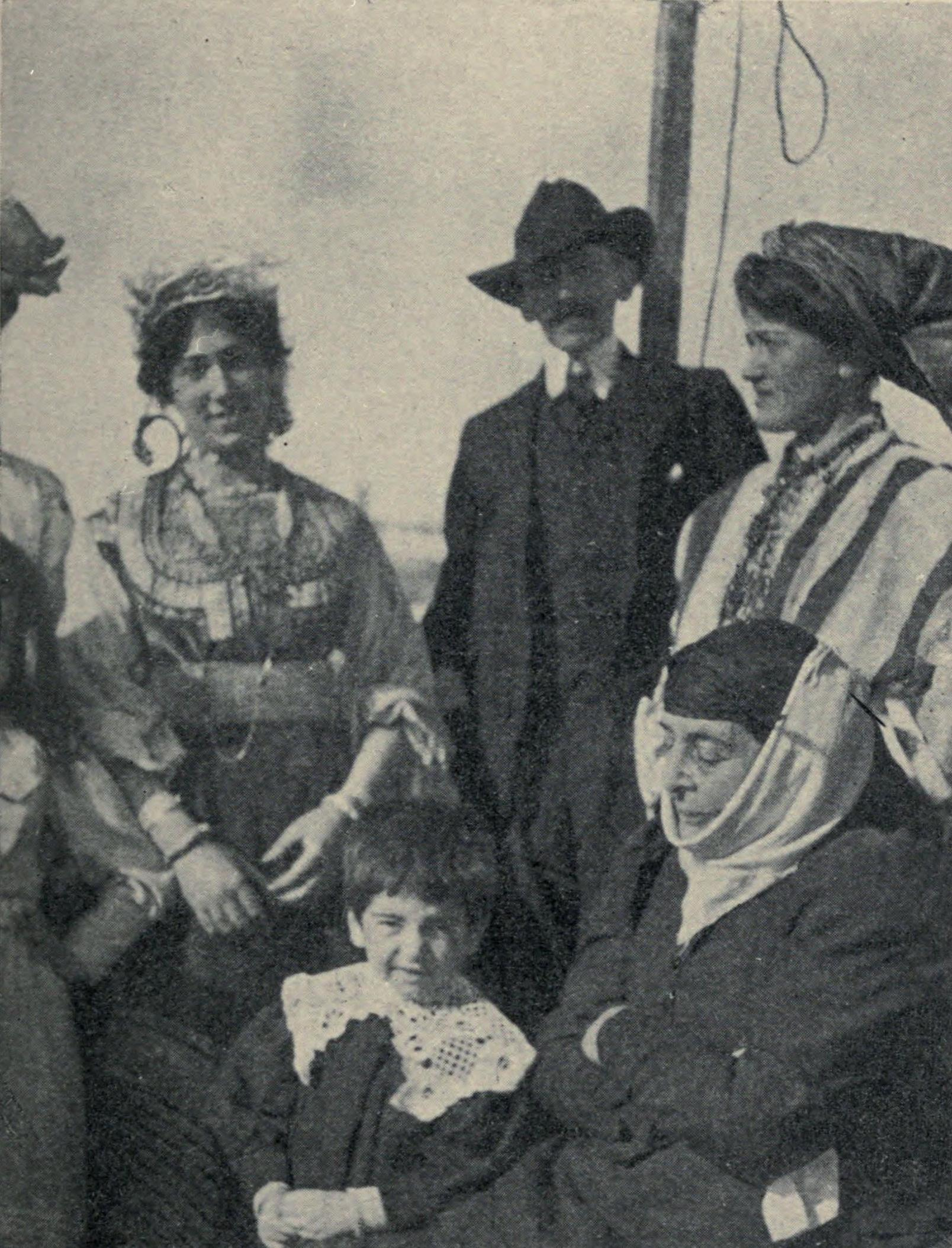
Sephardi Jews of Algiers c.1905

In the late 19th century and during the 1930s, mayors elected on anti-Jewish agendas sought to disenfranchise Jewish voters in their municipalities, as seen in Sidi-Bel-Abbès, when they could not directly repeal the Crémieux Decree. In these municipalities, Jewish voters were required to provide proof that they or their ancestors had been born in Algeria before 1830. Failure to provide such proof was considered attempted fraud and resulted in removal from the electoral rolls.

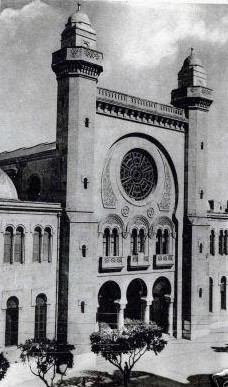
Great Synagogue of Oran, turned into a mosque

In 1931, Jews made up less than 2% of Algeria's total population. This population was more represented in the largest cities: Algiers, Constantine, and Oran, which each had Jewish populations of over 7%. Many smaller cities such as Blida, Tlemcen, and Setif also had small Jewish populations. By the mid-thirties, François de La Rocque's extremist Croix-de-Feu and, later, the French Social Party movements in Algeria proved active in trying to turn Muslims against Algerian Jews by publishing tracts in Arabic, and were responsible for inciting the 1934 Constantine Pogrom, in which 25 Jews were killed and some 200 stores were pillaged.

Zionism had a marginal presence under French rule. A 1920 communication from a 250-strong local Zionist association to the World Zionist Organization said that in the upper echelons of Algerian Jewry, "the wealthy and influential Jews of Algeria are opposed to Zionism and so far we have not counted on their support"; because they consider themselves "French first and foremost, they have no interest in the question of Zionism and are happy here".

=== Holocaust in Algeria, under the Vichy regime ===
After the Nazi German occupation of Northern France and the creation of the pro-Nazi collaborationist Vichy regime in Southern France during the Second World War, Algeria was under the control of the Vichy regime. One of the first moves of the regime was to revoke the effects of the Crémieux Decree, on October 7, 1940, thereby abolishing French citizenship for Algerian Jews, affecting some 110,000 Algerians. Under Vichy rule in Algeria, even Karaites and Jews who had converted to another religion were subject to antisemitic laws, known collectively as Statut des Juifs. The Vichy regime's laws ensured that Jews were forbidden from holding public office or other governmental positions, as well as from holding jobs in industries such as insurance and real estate. In addition, the Vichy regime set strict limitations on Jewish people working as doctors or lawyers. In no way dictated by Nazi Germany, this policy of blacklisting Jews was exclusively the initiative of the Vichy government.

The Vichy regime also limited the number of Jewish children in Algeria's public school system, and eventually terminated all Jewish enrolment in public schools. In response, Jewish professors who had been forced from their jobs set up a Jewish university in 1941, only for its forced dissolution to occur at the end of that same year. The Jewish communities of Algeria also set up a system of Jewish primary schools for children, and by 1942 some 20,000 Jewish children were enrolled in 70 elementary and 5 secondary schools all over Algeria. The Vichy government eventually created legislation allowing the government to control school curriculum and schedules, which helped dampen efforts to educate young Jews in Algeria.

It was in this context that the French authorities carried out a legal spoliation of Jewish property, known as "economic Aryanisation" in Nazi-inspired terminology, in order to "eliminate all Jewish influence" in the economy. In the space of a few months, more than 2,500 properties were taken from their owners and entrusted to commissaires-gérants who had put themselves forward as candidates and whose dossiers had been validated. While most of them were French nationals from the colony, there were also a handful of Muslims among the provisional administrators, at least those who had not been rejected by the authorities. Careful examination of the archives reveals a geography of spoliation. As the Jews were main actors in trading with the Muslims, the colonial authorities sometimes feared that spoliation would jeopardise the fragile social balance, or even create unrest among the "indigenous" population that would be difficult to control. After the Allied landings, the return to normality was slow and many spoliated people had difficulty recovering their property.

Under Admiral Darlan and General Giraud, two French officials who administered the French military in North Africa, the antisemitic legislation was applied more severely in Algeria than France itself, under the pretext that it enabled greater equality between Muslims and Jews and considered racial laws a condition sine qua non of the armistice. Under the Vichy regime in Algeria, an office called the "Special Department for the Control of the Jewish Problem" handled the execution of laws applying to Algeria's Jewish population. This was unique in French North Africa, and as such the laws covering the status of Jews were governed much more harshly in Algeria than in Morocco or Tunisia. A bureau for "Economic Aryanization" was also installed in order to eradicate the Jewish community's significance in the economy, mostly by taking control of Jewish businesses.

On March 31, 1942, the Vichy government issued a decree demanding the creation of a local Jewish government called the Union Générale des Israélites d'Algérie (UGIA). The UGIA was intended to be a body of Jews that would execute the Vichy regulations within Jewish communities, and was seen by much of the Jewish population as collaboration with the government. In response, many young Jews joined the Algerian resistance movement, which itself had been founded by Jews in 1940. On November 8, 1942, the Algerian resistance to the Vichy government took part in the takeover of Algiers in preparation for the Allied liberation of North Africa, known as "Operation Torch." Of the 377 resistance members who took Algiers, 315 were Jewish. In November 1942, Allied forces landed and took control of Algiers and the rest of Algeria. However, Jews were not returned all of their former civil rights and liberties, nor their French citizenships until 1943. This can partially be explained by the fact that Giraud himself, along with the Governor-General Marcel Peyrouton, in promulgating the cancellation of Vichy statutes on March 14, 1943, after the allies landed in North Africa, retained exceptionally the decree abolishing citizenship rights for Algerian Jews, claiming that they did not wish to incite violence between the Jewish and Muslim communities in Algiers. It was not until the arrival of Charles de Gaulle in October 1943 that Jewish Algerians finally regained their French citizenship with the reinstatement of the Crémieux Decree.

In addition to the discriminatory and antisemitic laws faced by Jews throughout Algeria, some 2,000 Jews were placed in concentration camps at Bedeau and Djelfa. The camp at Bedeau, near Sidi-bel-Abbes, became a place for the concentration of Jewish Algerian soldiers, who were forced to perform hard labor. These prisoners formed the "Jewish Work Group," and worked on a Vichy plan for a trans-Saharan railroad; many died from hunger, exhaustion, disease, or beatings.

=== After WWII ===
During the Algerian War, most Algerian Jews took sides with France, out of loyalty to the Republic which gave them French citizenship, against the Arab Independence movement, though they rejected that part of the official policy which proposed independence for Algeria. Some Jews did join the FLN fighting for independence, but a larger group made common cause with the OAS, secret paramilitary group. Throughout the Independence War, violence remained palpable and relations deteriorated following clashes and assassinations, such as that of the rabbi of Nédroma in November 1956, the chief rabbi of Médéa in March 1957, and the great singer Cheikh Raymond Leyris.

The FLN published declarations guaranteeing a place in Algeria for Jews as an integral constituent of the Algerian people, hoping to attract their support. Algerian Muslims had assisted Jews during their trials under the Vichy régime in WW2, when their citizenship rights under the Crémieux Degree had been revoked.

Some Algerian Jews responded positively to the call from the FLN, joining with local militias or making financial contributions. For these Jews, they recognized a common attachment to Algeria and the antisemitism prevalent among the French. For others, memories of the 1934 pogrom, and incidents of violent Muslim assault on Jews in Constantine and Batna, together with arson attacks on the Batna and Orleanville synagogues, played a role in their decisions to turn down the offer.

In 1961, with the French National Assembly Law 61-805, the Mozabite Jews, who had been excluded from the Cremieux Decree, were also given French citizenship.

Between late 1961 and late summer 1962, 130,000 of Algeria's approximately 140,000 Jews left for France, while about 10,000 of them emigrated to Israel. Moroccan Jews who were living in Algeria and Jews from the M'zab Valley in the Algerian Sahara, who did not have French citizenship, as well as a small number of Algerian Jews from Constantine, also emigrated to Israel at that time. The fact that Israel was unable to attract more Jewish immigrants from Algeria dismayed Zionist representatives in Algeria as well as the Israeli authorities; Zionism remained a marginal movement within Algerian Jewish society compared to other North African countries. In any case, it is clear that the weakness of Zionist action in Algeria was largely due to the French nationality of Algerian Jews.

Algerian Jews massively left Algeria because of the fear of a return to the status of dhimmi, which an independent state founded on an Arab-Muslim identity – the pillar of the future Algeria might engender, where the Jewish minority would find no place, as many had foreseen from the eve of independence.

In 1961, the Bizerte crisis caused upheaval and increased the rate of Jewish migration to France. Jews, considered to be responsible for the conflict because of their proximity to Europeans, were the victims of antisemitic movements. In just a few months, France received as many refugees as in the previous six years.

Following a 1961 referendum, the 1962 Évian Accords secured Algerian independence. Some Algerian Jews had joined the Organisation armée secrète, which aimed to disrupt the process of independence with bombings and assassination attempts, targets including Charles de Gaulle and Jean-Paul Sartre.

The OAS and the right-wing in Algeria reached out to Jews and portrayed them as French, while the FLN reminded Jews of the Vichy years and urged Jews to follow the Jews of Morocco and Tunisia in embracing the "liberty," "prosperity" and "dignity" of the FLN. Despite the appeals, Jews became victim of attacks from both groups. The FLN became uninterested in outreach and began assassinating Jewish leaders. The OAS for their part also assassinated Jews perceived as supporting independence. Jews were caught in the middle and began to leave the country.

The accords led to a mass exodus of pieds noirs in the early 1960s, while North African Jews faced a wave of antisemitism in the Maghreb. Moreover, Algerian Jews also identified more with their attachment to France, which Algerians discovered in the nineteenth century in their fight for French naturalization. The Jews of Algeria, but also of Morocco and Tunisia, showed a great attachment to metropolitan France, as shown by their attitude during the colonial wars and their choice to settle in France: "The Jews felt perfectly French and proud to be so. Moreover, the antisemitic violence that had been manifesting itself in the colony since the last quarter of the nineteenth century affected every aspect of daily life in minute detail.

=== Independent Algeria ===
More than 90% of Algerian Jews (130,000 out of about 140,000) opted for France, they left Algeria en masse. According to Joëlle Allouche-Benayoun, it was not because they were persecuted there as Jews but because they had so deeply internalized their "Frenchness" that they considered their destiny linked to that of the French, although some went to Israel. Johannes Heuman ascribes the flight not only to their greater identification with France, but to having faced violence and anti-Jewish sentiment during the Algerian War as a response to the community's general stance of neutrality. By 1969, fewer than 1,000 Jews were still living in Algeria. By 1975, because of a lack of worshippers, all but one of the country's synagogues were closed, having been converted into mosques or libraries.

After the Evian agreements of 19 March 1962, the vast majority of the remaining Jews in Algeria were among the 800,000 French people who crossed the Mediterranean at in the space of a few months. Regarded as repatriates in the same way as the pieds noirs, they gradually integrated into the French Jewish community, which they helped to reshape, like their co-religionists who had previously arrived from Egypt, Tunisia and Morocco. The number of those who settled in Israel is estimated at 10,000. As for those who remain in Algeria, they can only observe that the young independent nation is being built on an Arab-Muslim identity, since the law on the nationality code of 12 March 1963 automatically grants Algerian nationality only to those who have a ‘nationality of origin’, defined by their Muslim personal status under French domination.

Following the mass departure of Algerian Jews in 1961–1962, the 1963 Nationality Code granted Algerian citizenship to those with Muslim civil status. While the Évian Accords provided a three-year window for French citizens in Algeria, including the remaining Jewish population, to apply for Algerian nationality, few chose to do so. Johannes Heuman and Delphine Perrin note that because the 1963 code explicitly defined the new nation in terms of Muslim status, it effectively alienated the non-Muslim population. Consequently, almost all the remaining Jews felt excluded from the new Arab-Islamic national identity and retained their French citizenship.

Since 2005, the Algerian government has attempted to reduce discrimination against the Jewish population by establishing a Jewish association and passing a law that recognized freedom of religion. They also allowed a relaunching of Jewish pilgrimage, to the most holy Jewish sites in North Africa. In 2014, the Minister of Religious Affairs Mohammed Eissa announced that the Algerian government would foster the reopening of Jewish synagogues. However, this never came to fruition, with Eissa stating that it was no longer in the interest of Algerian Jews. In 2017, there were an estimated 50 Jews remaining in Algeria, mostly in Algiers. As of 2020, there were an estimated 200 Jews in Algeria.

== Traditional dress ==
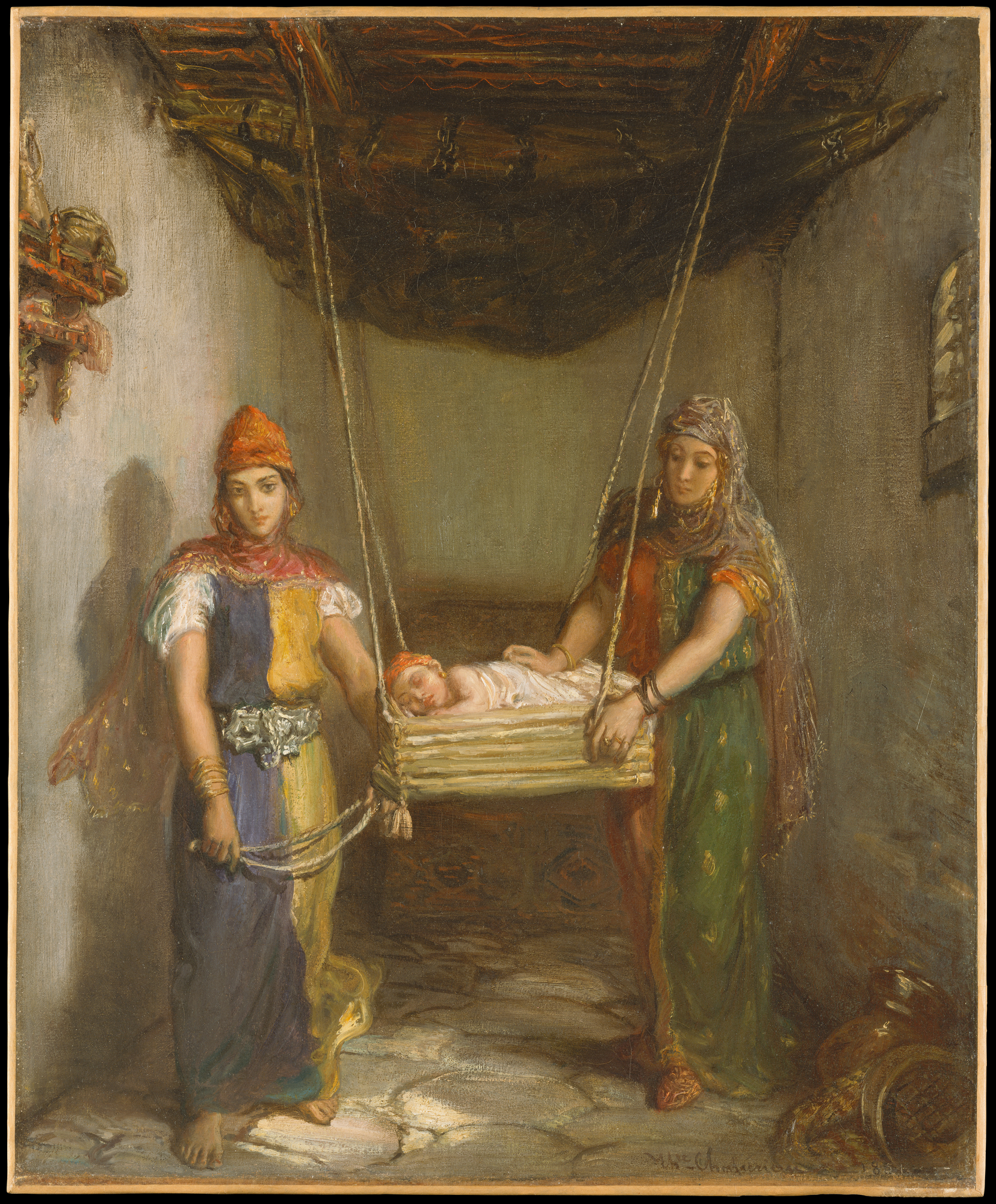
Jewish women in Constantine, Algeria (1851), by Théodore Chassériau, Metropolitan Museum of Art

According to the Jewish Encyclopedia,

A contemporary [1906] Jewess of Algiers wears on her head a "takrita" (handkerchief), is dressed in a "bedenor" (gown with a bodice trimmed with lace) and a striped vest with long sleeves coming to the waist. The "mosse" (girdle) is of silk. The native Algerian Jew wears a "ṭarbush" or oblong turban with silken tassel, a "ṣadriyyah" or vest with large sleeves, and "sarwal" or pantaloons fastened by a "ḥizam" (girdle), all being covered by a mantle, a burnus (also spelled burnoose), and a large silk handkerchief, the tassels of which hang down to his feet. At an earlier stage the Algerian Jewess wore a tall cone-shaped hat resembling those used in England in the fifteenth century.

== Synagogues in Algeria ==
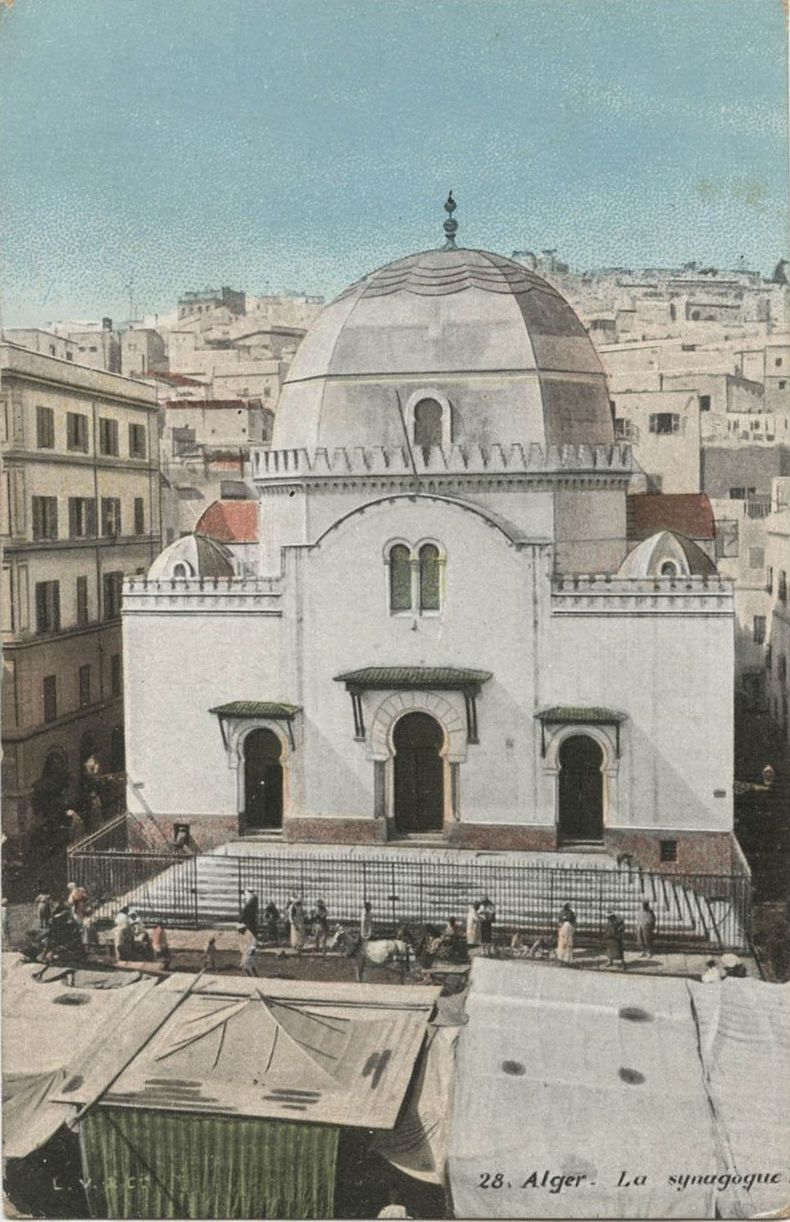
Grande Synagogue, Algiers

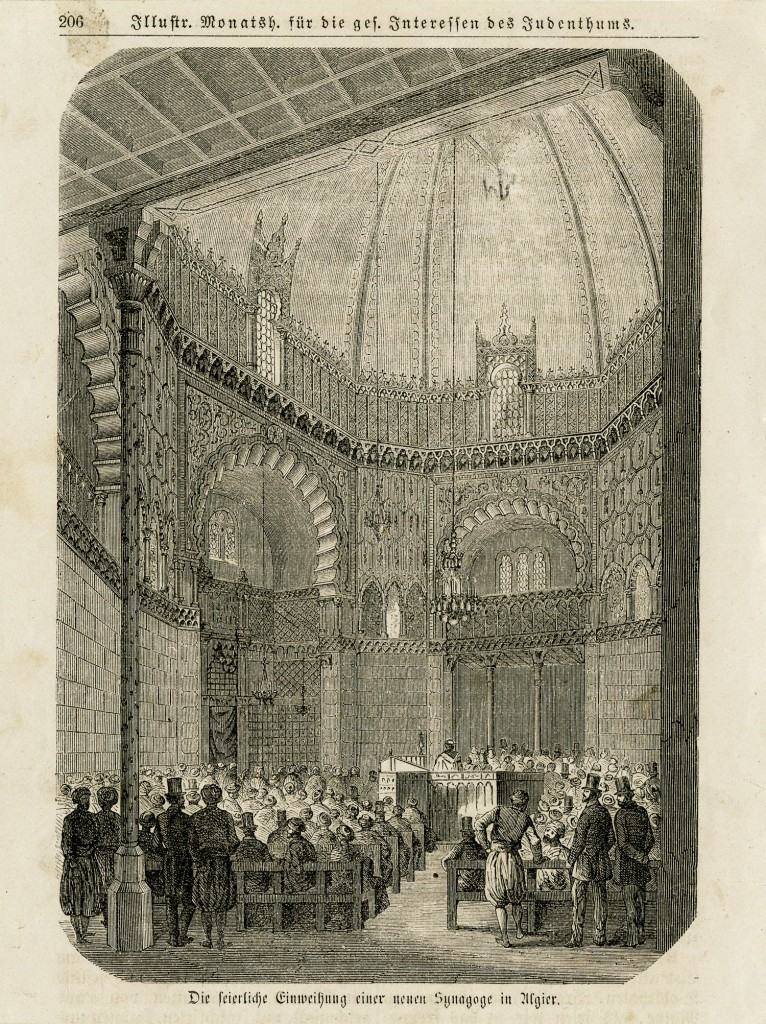
Grande Synagogue, Algiers

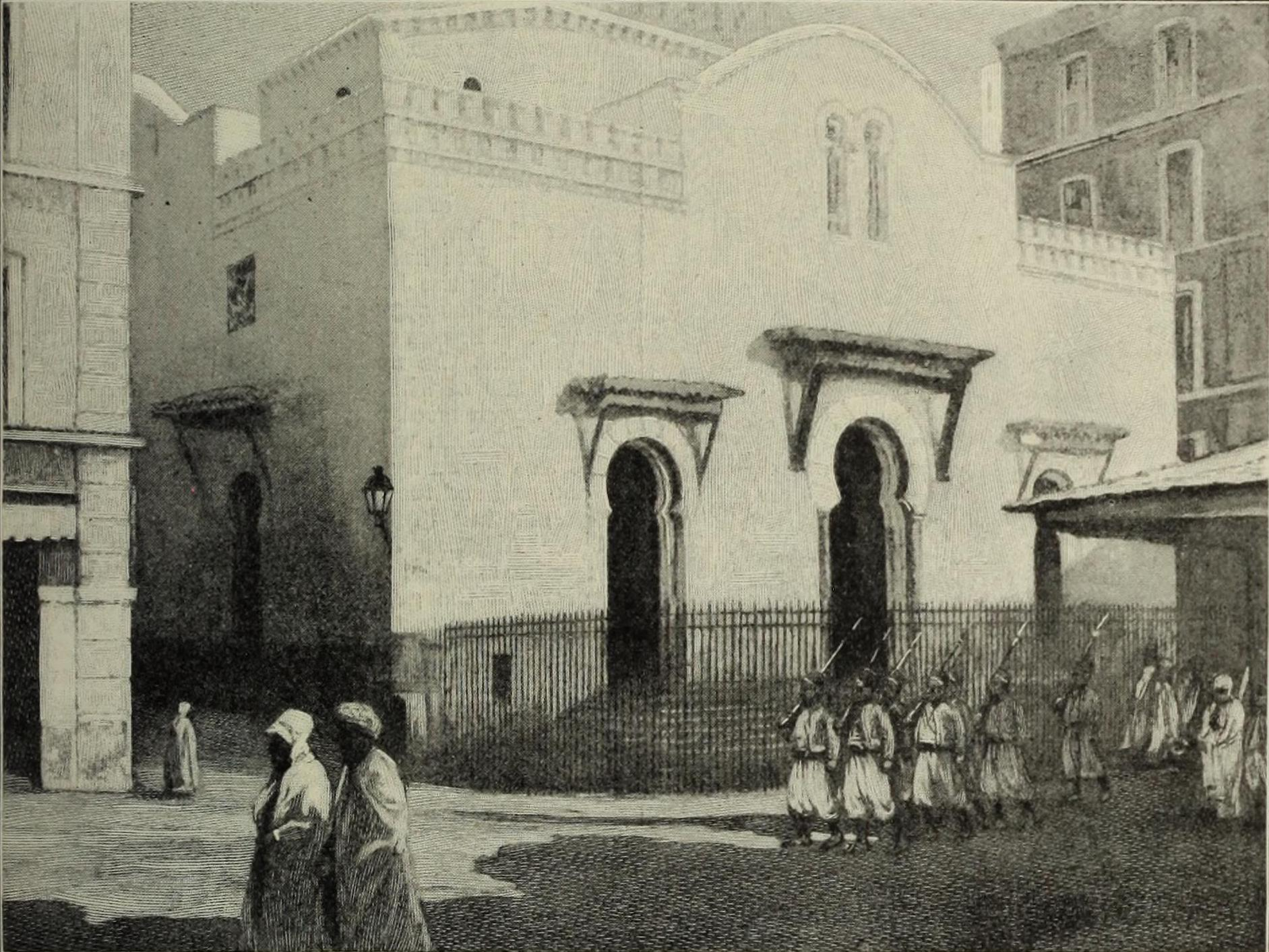
Grande Synagogue, Algiers

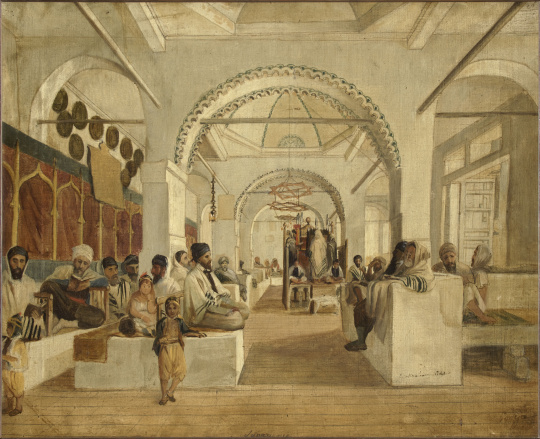
Sanya Synagogue, Algiers

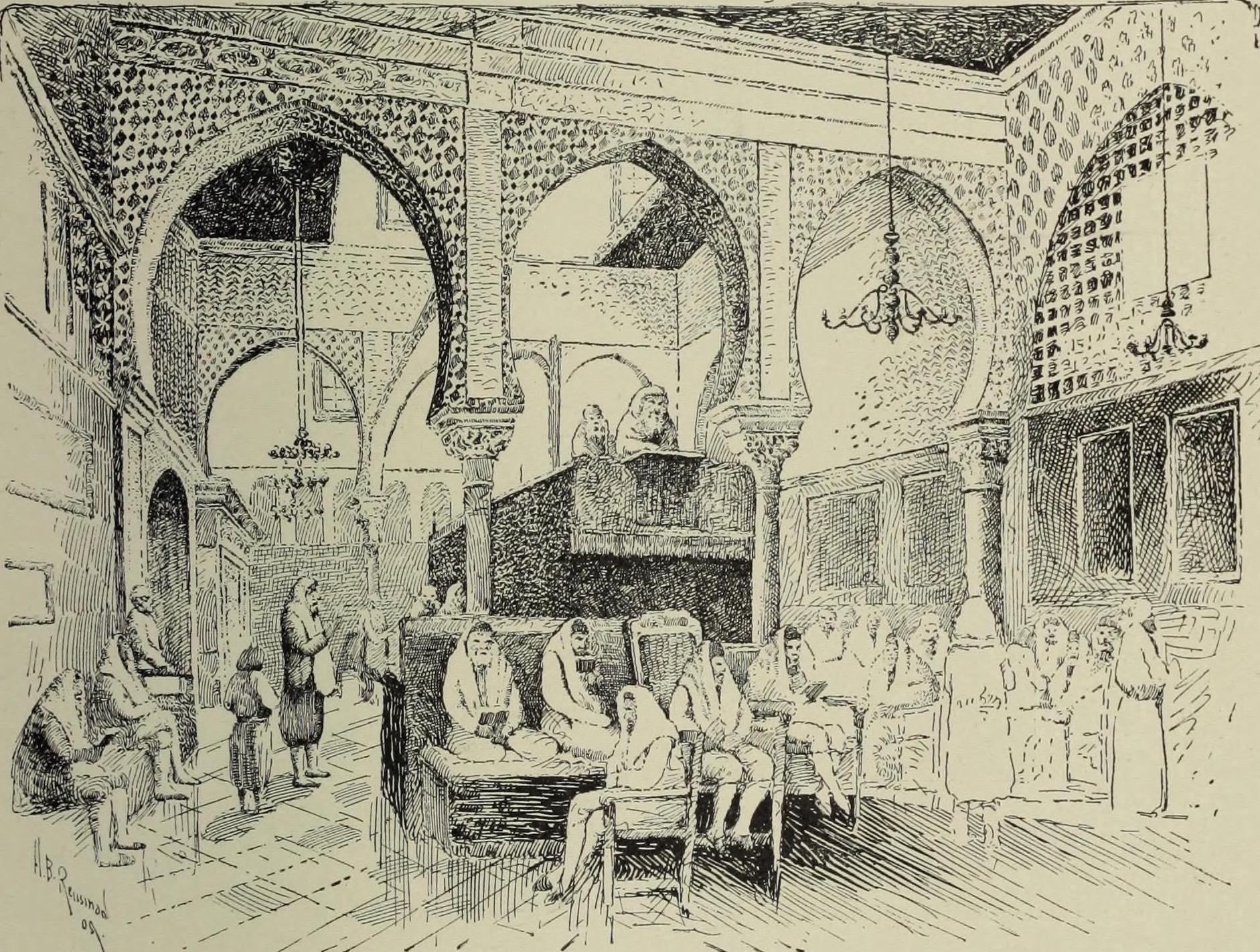
Synagogue, Algiers

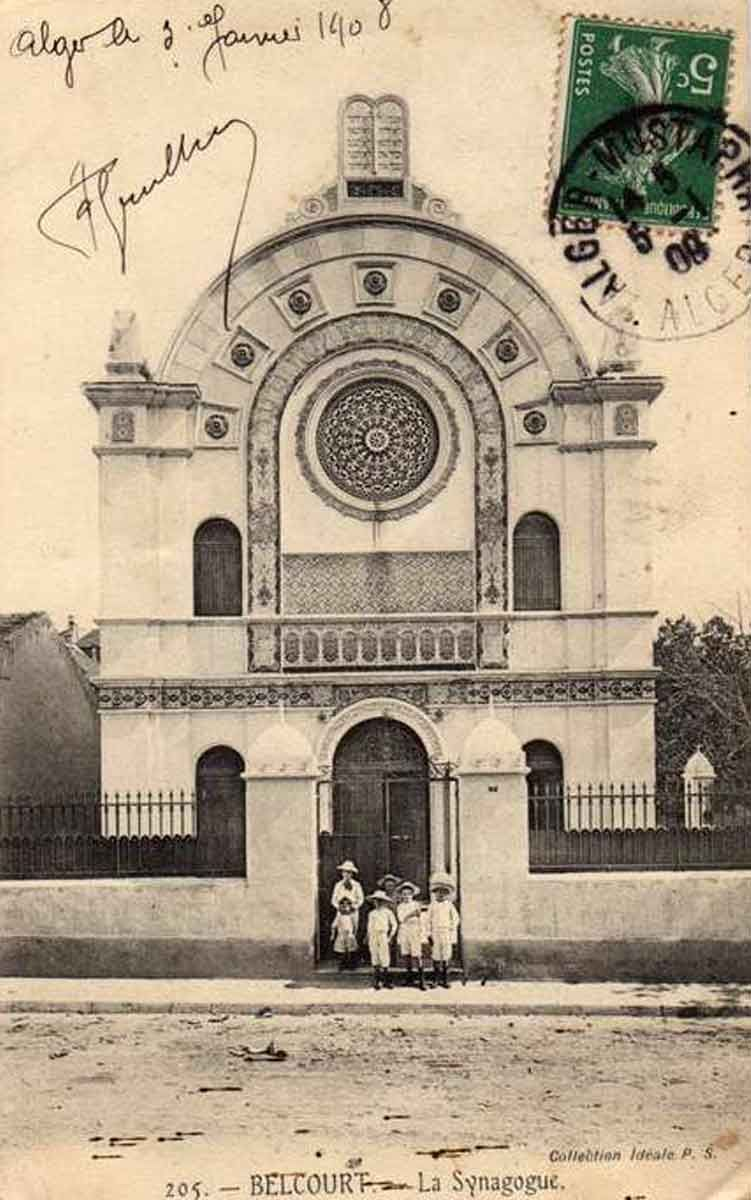
Belcourt Synagogue, Algiers

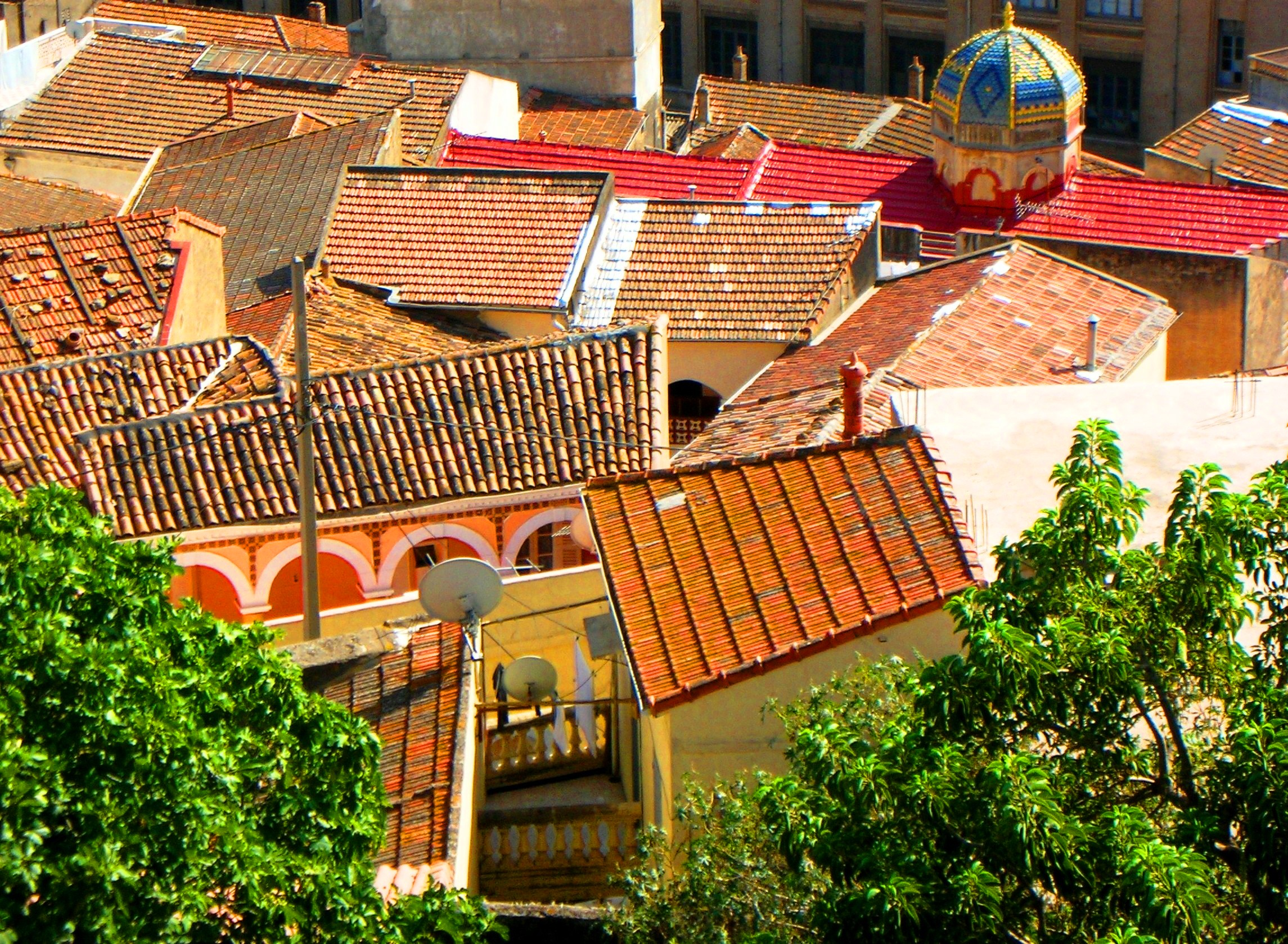
Houma Keramane, Béjaïa

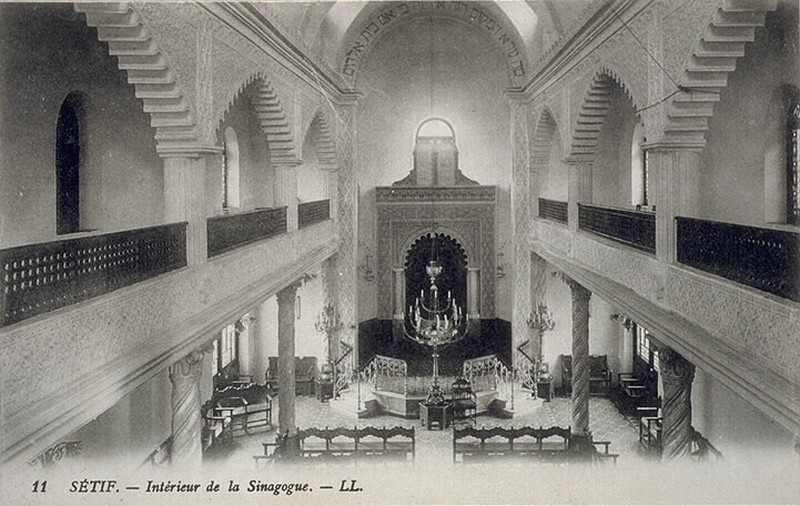
Sétif synagogue

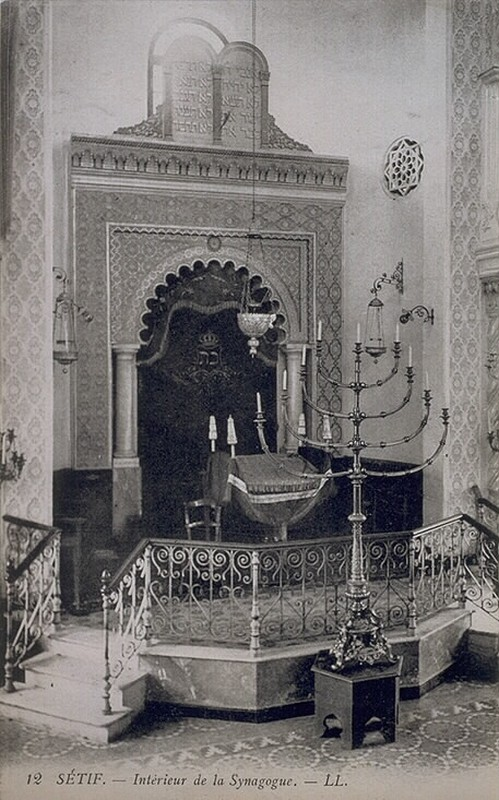
Sétif synagogue interior

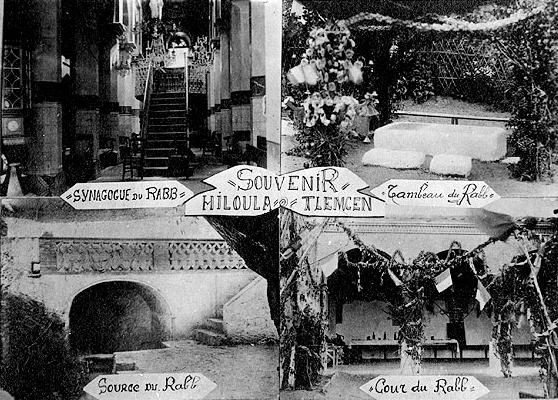
Tlemcen synagogue

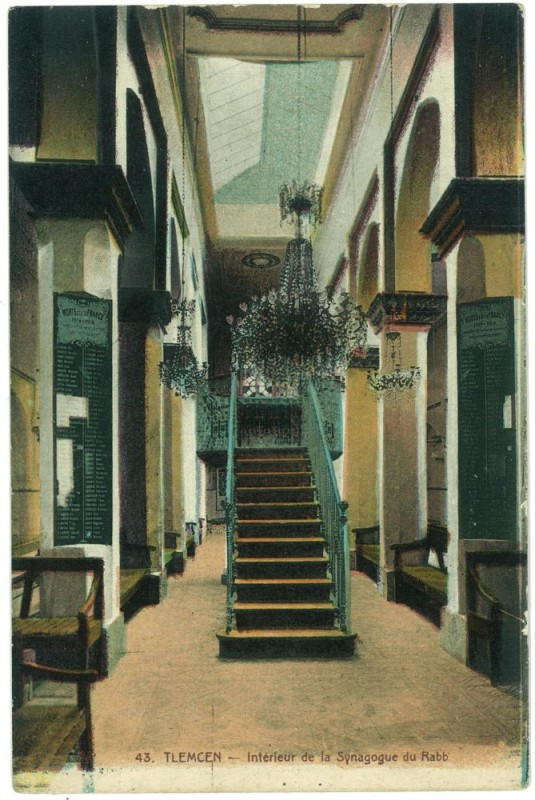
Rabbi Ephraim Ankawa Synagogue in Tlemcen

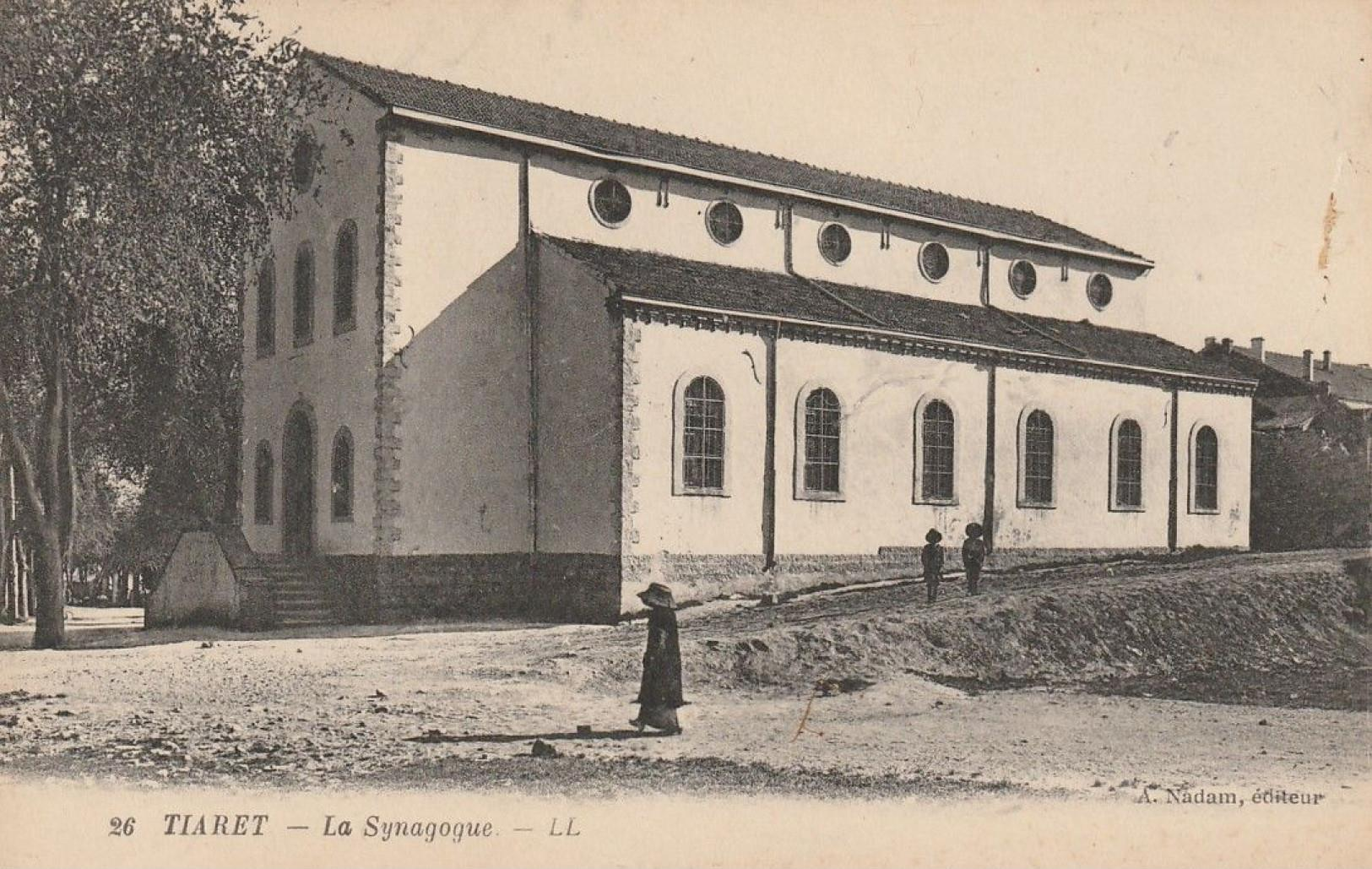
Tiaret Synagogue

== Notable Algerian Jews ==
- Ariella Azoulay, author, curator, and decolonial scholar recognised for developing the theory of ‘potential history’
- Jean-Pierre Barda, singer, actor, make-up artist
- José Aboulker, member of the anti-Nazi resistance
- Alon Abutbul, actor
- Franck Amsallem, jazz pianist and composer
- Françoise Atlan, French singer
- Yvan Attal, film director, actor (Algerian-born parents)
- Jacques Attali, economist, writer
- Danny Ayalon, politician
- Jean-Pierre Bacri, actor
- Myriam Ben, activist and novelist
- Baruj Benacerraf, immunologist, Nobel prize (1980) (Algerian Jewish mother)
- Paul Benacerraf, philosopher (Algerian Jewish mother)
- Maurice Benayoun, artist
- Jean Benguigui, actor
- Éric Benhamou, businessman, CEO of 3Com, venture capitalist, philanthropist
- Michel Benita, double bass player
- Daniel Bensaïd, philosopher and trotskyist (Jewish Algerian father)
- Richard Berry, actor
- Lili Boniche, musician
- Eliyahu Zini, Algerian-born rabbi and head of a Hesder Yeshiva in the Israeli town of Haifa and doctor of mathematics from the Technion.
- Yosef Ben David Renassia, Constantine-born rabbi, writer, and preservationist. Moved to Israel in 1962 and died in Dimona.
- Patrick Bruel, singer, actor
- Alain Chabat, actor
- André Chouraqui, writer
- Élie Chouraqui, French film director and scriptwriter
- Hélène Cixous, feminist writer
- Robert Cohen, boxer: World Bantamweight Champion
- Annie Cohen-Solal, academic and biographer of Jean-Paul Sartre
- Claude Cohen-Tannoudji, physicist, Nobel prize (1997)
- Jean-François Copé, (Algerian Jewish mother), President of the Union for a Popular Movement (UMP) Group in the French National Assembly
- Abraham Daninos, author, wrote the first theatre play in Arabic (1847)
- Gérard Darmon, actor
- Jacques Derrida, post-structuralist philosopher
- Pascal Elbé, actor
- Jean-Pierre Elkabbach, journalist
- David Foenkinos, French born author and screenwriter.
- Eva Green, actress (mother was of Algerian Jewish descent)
- Alphonse Halimi, boxer: World Bantamweight Champion
- Roger Hanin, film actor & director
- Marlène Jobert, actress
- Judah Kalaẓ, cabalist and moralist
- Oded Kattash, Israeli basketball player, a superstar in Israel and Greece, currently head coach of Israel's national team and Panathinaikos
- Haim Korsia, Chief Rabbi of France (Algerian parents)
- Claude Lelouch, film director (Algerian Jew father)
- Bernard-Henri Lévy, philosopher
- Reinette L'Oranaise, singer
- Enrico Macias, singer
- Shiri Maimon, singer
- Elissa Rhaïs, novelist
- Martial Solal, jazz pianist and composer
- Benjamin Stora, historian
- Avraham Tal, Israeli singer
- Patrick Timsit, humorist, actor
- Shmuel Trigano, sociologist and philosopher
- Éric Zemmour, journalist
- Claude Zidi, film director

== Genetics ==
The largest study to date on the Jews of North Africa has been led by Gerard Lucotte et al. in 2003. Sephardi population studied is as follows: 58 Jews from Algeria, 190 from Morocco, 64 from Tunisia, 49 from the island of Djerba, 9 and 11 from Libya and Egypt, respectively, which makes 381 people. This study showed that the Jews of North Africa showed frequencies of their paternal haplotypes almost equal to those of the Lebanese and Palestinian non-Jews when compared to European non-Jews.

The Moroccan/Algerian, Djerban/Tunisian and Libyan subgroups of North African Jewry were found to demonstrate varying levels of Middle Eastern (40-42%), European (37-39%) and North African ancestry (20-21%), with Moroccan and Algerian Jews tending to be genetically closer to each other than to Djerban Jews and Libyan Jews. According to the study:

"distinctive North African Jewish population clusters with proximity to other Jewish populations and variable degrees of Middle Eastern, European, and North African admixture. Two major subgroups were identified by principal component, neighbor joining tree, and identity-by-descent analysis—Moroccan/Algerian and Djerban/Libyan—that varied in their degree of European admixture. These populations showed a high degree of endogamy and were part of a larger Ashkenazi and Sephardic Jewish group. By principal component analysis, these North African groups were orthogonal to contemporary populations from North and South Morocco, Western Sahara, Tunisia, Libya, and Egypt. Thus, this study is compatible with the history of North African Jews—founding during Classical Antiquity with proselytism of local populations, followed by genetic isolation with the rise of Christianity and then Islam, and admixture following the emigration of Sephardic Jews during the Inquisition."

== Population numbers ==
There are gaps in the information available on the Jewish population in Algeria over time, and everyone tries to get around them as best they can, which leads to variations in estimates and results depending on the source. These estimates are clearly flawed because part of the territory was outside French control, because only ‘municipal populations’ are counted, because rural dwellers are not counted, and because the evaluation methods were incomplete.

Year	Jewish Population
1830	26,000
1850	21,048
1866	33,952
1881	52,000
1914	96,000
1921	73,967
1931	110,000
1941	117,646
1948	140,000
1954	140,000
1962	110,000
1963	5 000
1970	2000
1980	1000
2020	300
2025	200

== In culture ==
- The Rabbi's Cat — A 2011 French animated film directed by Joann Sfar and Antoine Delesvaux, based on volumes one, two and five of Sfar's comics series with the same title. It tells the story of a cat, who obtains the ability to speak after swallowing a parrot, and its owner who is a rabbi in 1920s Algeria.

== See also ==
- History of the Jews in Africa

=== Regions ===
- History of the Jews in Central Africa
- History of the Jews in East Africa
- History of the Jews in North Africa
- History of the Jews in Southern Africa
- History of the Jews in West Africa

=== Topics ===
- History of the Jews in Carthage
- History of the Jews in Constantine
- Jewish exodus from the Muslim world
- Maghrebi Jews
- Sephardic Jews

== Sources ==
- Fieni, David (2020). Decadent Orientalisms: The Decay of Colonial Modernity. Fordham University Press. ISBN 9780823286409.
- Roberts, Sohpie P. (2017). Citizenship and Antisemitism in French Colonial Algeria, 1870-1962. Cambridge University Press. ISBN 9781107188150.
- Maddy-Weitzman, Bruce (2014). "Narrating The Past, Serving the Present: The Berber Identity Movement and the Jewish Connection". Nationalism, Identity and Politics: Israel and the Middle East. Studies in Honor of Prof. Asher Susser: 106 – via ResearchGate.
