= Abdellah Ben Salem Mosque =

Mosque in Oran City, Oran Province, Algeria

- مسجد عبدالله بن سلام
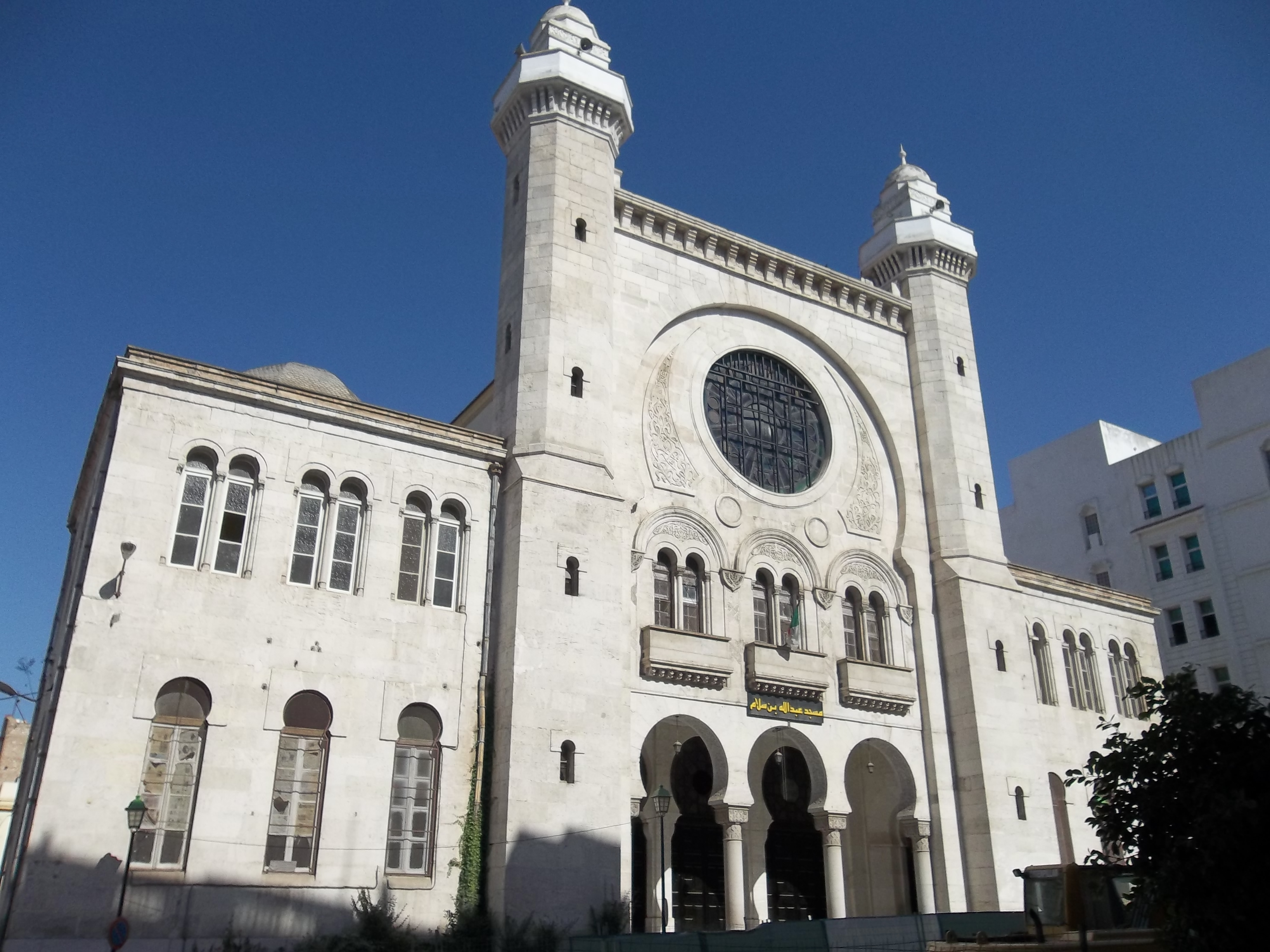

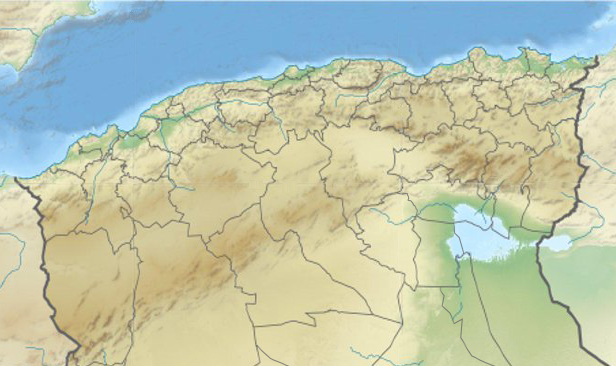
- Location of the mosque in northern Algeria

Religion
- Affiliation: Islam
- Ecclesiastical or organizational status: Synagogue (1880–1962); Mosque (since 1975)
- Year consecrated: 1918 (as a synagogue); 1975 (as a mosque)
- Status: Active

Location
- Location: Boulevard Maata Mohamed El Habib, Oran
- Country: Algeria
- Interactive map of Abdellah Ben Salem Mosque
- Coordinates: 35°42′00″N 0°39′01″W

Architecture
- Type: Synagogue architecture
- Style: Moorish Revival
- Completed: 1880 (as a synagogue); 1975 (as a mosque)

The Abdellah Ben Salem Mosque (Arabic: مسجد عبد الله بن سلام) is a mosque in Oran, Algeria. Formerly the Great Synagogue of Oran (French: Grande synagogue d'Oran), it was the largest synagogue in Africa. Also known as Temple Israélite, it was located on Boulevard Joffre, currently Boulevard Maata Mohamed El Habib.

== History ==
Construction of the Orthodox Jewish synagogue began in 1879 at the initiative of Simon Kanoui, and took 38 years to complete. The synagogue was completed in the Neo-Mudéjar and Moorish Revival styles. When Algeria gained its independence in 1962, almost all Algerian Jews, who were considered French citizens since the Crémieux Decree of 1870, were repatriated to France alongside the Pied-Noir settlers.

In 1975, the synagogue was converted into a mosque and named after Abdullah ibn Salam, a seventh-century Jew from Medina and companion of Muhammad who converted to Islam.

== See also ==
- History of the Jews in Algeria
- Djamaa Ben farès
- Conversion of non-Islamic places of worship into mosques
- List of mosques in Algeria
- List of synagogues in Algeria
