= History of the Jews in Constantine =

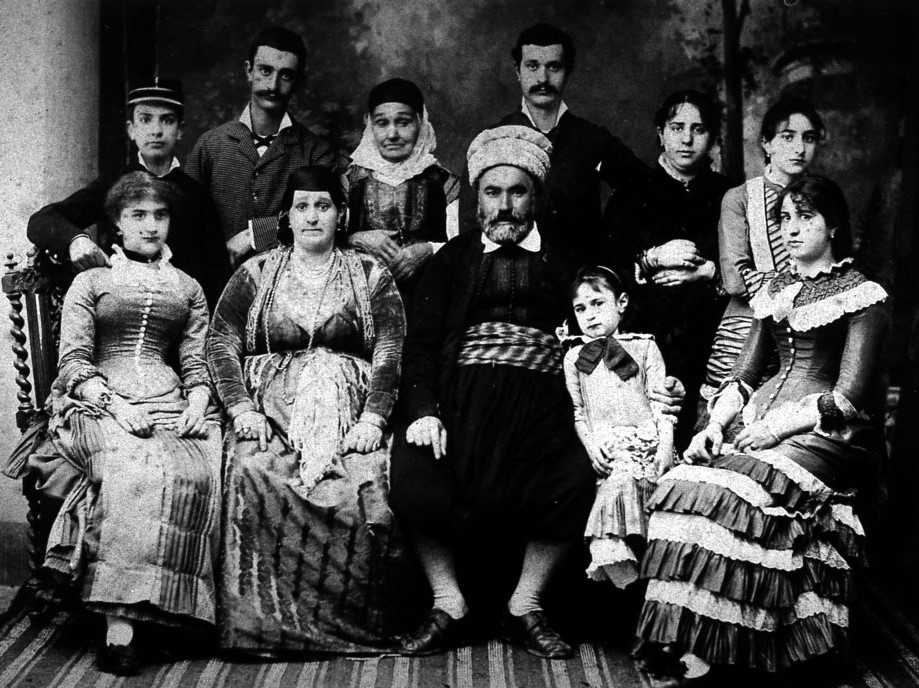
Jewish family of Constantine c. 1880

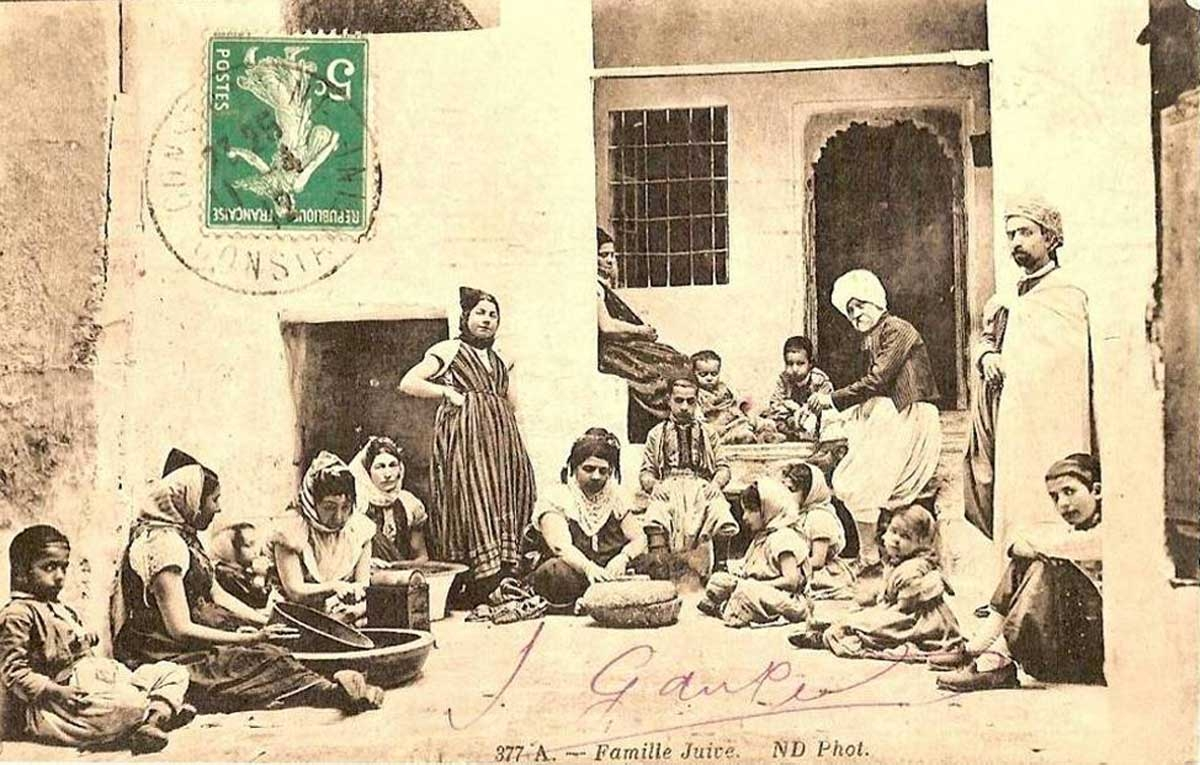
Jewish family of Constantine c. 1900

The Jewish community of Constantine dates back to the 2nd century AD though legends say it goes back the second temple period. The Jewish community of Constantine thrived under Muslim rule and reached prominence from the 15th to 18th centuries, with several prominent figures and a Jewish quarter. After French colonization in 1837 and citizenship grants in 1870, tensions between Muslims and Jews led to the 1934 Constantine riots. After Algerian gained independence in 1962, the Jews were expelled and most left for France instead of Israel due to Francophilia and a lack of Zionism, leaving only a few families by the late 1960s. Rabbi Yosef ben David Renassia's preservation efforts ensured the legacy of Constantine's Jewish heritage through religious texts and language preservation.

== Establishment ==
The Jewish community of Constantine dates back to the 2nd century AD. Though local tradition states that it goes back to the first temple period. During this time, Judaized Berbers inhabited the area surrounding Constantine.

== Muslim Rule ==
The Islamic conquest of the Maghreb brought little change to the Jewish community of Constantine. During this time Jewish Zakenim or elders would often serve similar functions in the Jewish community as Shieks would in the Muslim community. The Jewish community of Constantine had its own dialect of Judeo-Algerian Arabic called Constantinian.

Constantine was one of North Africa's greatest Jewish centers from the 15th century to the 18th century. With multiple notable figures including the poet Joseph Zimron the rabbi Maimun Najjar and writer Masʿud Zerbib.

During the 17th century a dedicated Jewish quarter was built in Constantine.

== French Colonization and Exodus ==
The French conquered Constantine in 1837 1534 of the 5000 Jews The Jews of Algeria were given French citizenship by the Crémieux Decree in 1870.

A Judeo-Algerian Arabic newspaper called El-Hikma ran in Constantine from 1922 to 1923. In 1934 riots erupted in Constantine against the local Jewish population.

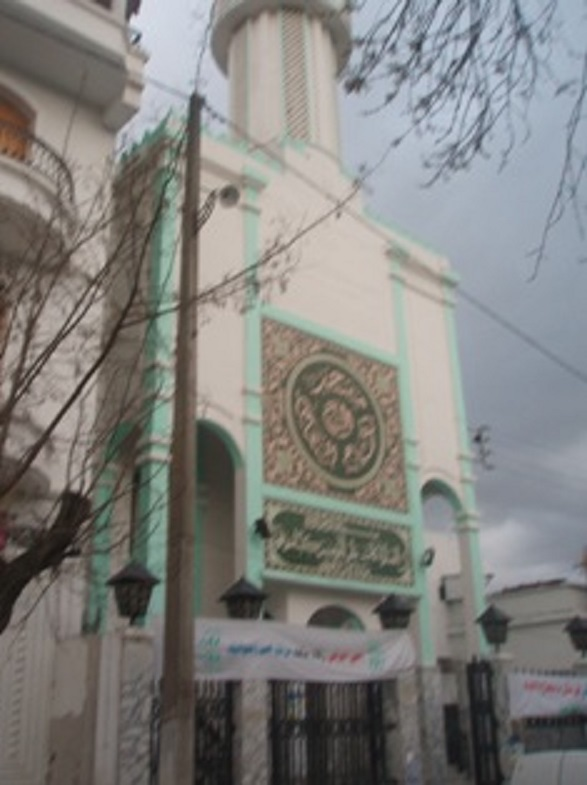
Former synagogue in Constantine, turned into a mosque

After Algerian Independence in 1962 most of the 15-20 thousand Jews in Constantine left the country mostly moving the France due to the communitie's francophilia and its lower amounts of Zionism. By the end of the 1960s only a few Jewish families remained in Constantine. The communities abandoned synagogues where either abandoned or they were turned into mosques.

== Legacy ==
A large of amount of works in the Constantinian dialect of Judeo-Algerian Arabic were preserved due to the works of the Rabbi Yosef ben David Renassia. Rabbi Renassia was determined to preserve the unique dialect, history and culture of the Jews on Constantine. he believed that preserving the language of the Constantine Jews was necessary to preserving their identity. His efforts to preserve the language resulted in over 100 volumes of texts on many topics, but most were religious in nature.
