= 1898 Algerian riots =

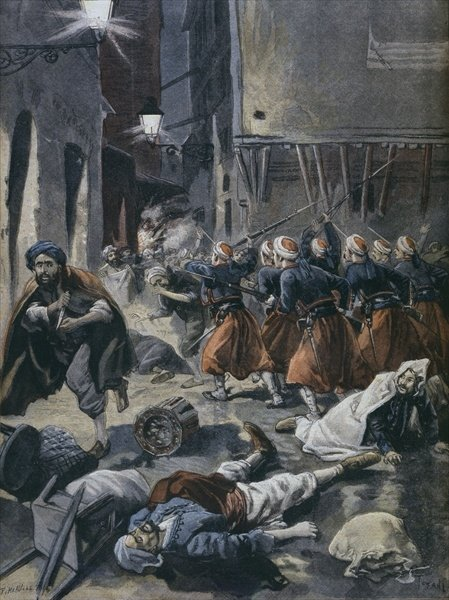
- Illustration by Le Petit Journal depicting the riots
- Location: Algiers, Mostaganem, Si-Mustapha, Boufarik, and Blida
- Date: January 18, 1898-January 24, 1898
- Target: Algerian Jews
- Attack type: Pogrom
- Convictions: 700 people

The 1898 Algerian riots were a series of violent and antisemitic attacks or pogroms against the Jewish community in Algeria, French North Africa, that occurred from January 18 to 24, 1898. The riots were sparked by the release of Alfred Dreyfus, a Jewish French officer who had been falsely convicted of treason. Riots occurred in Algiers, Mostaganem, Si-Mustapha, Boufarik, and Blida. Over 700 people were convicted and received prison terms for the riots.

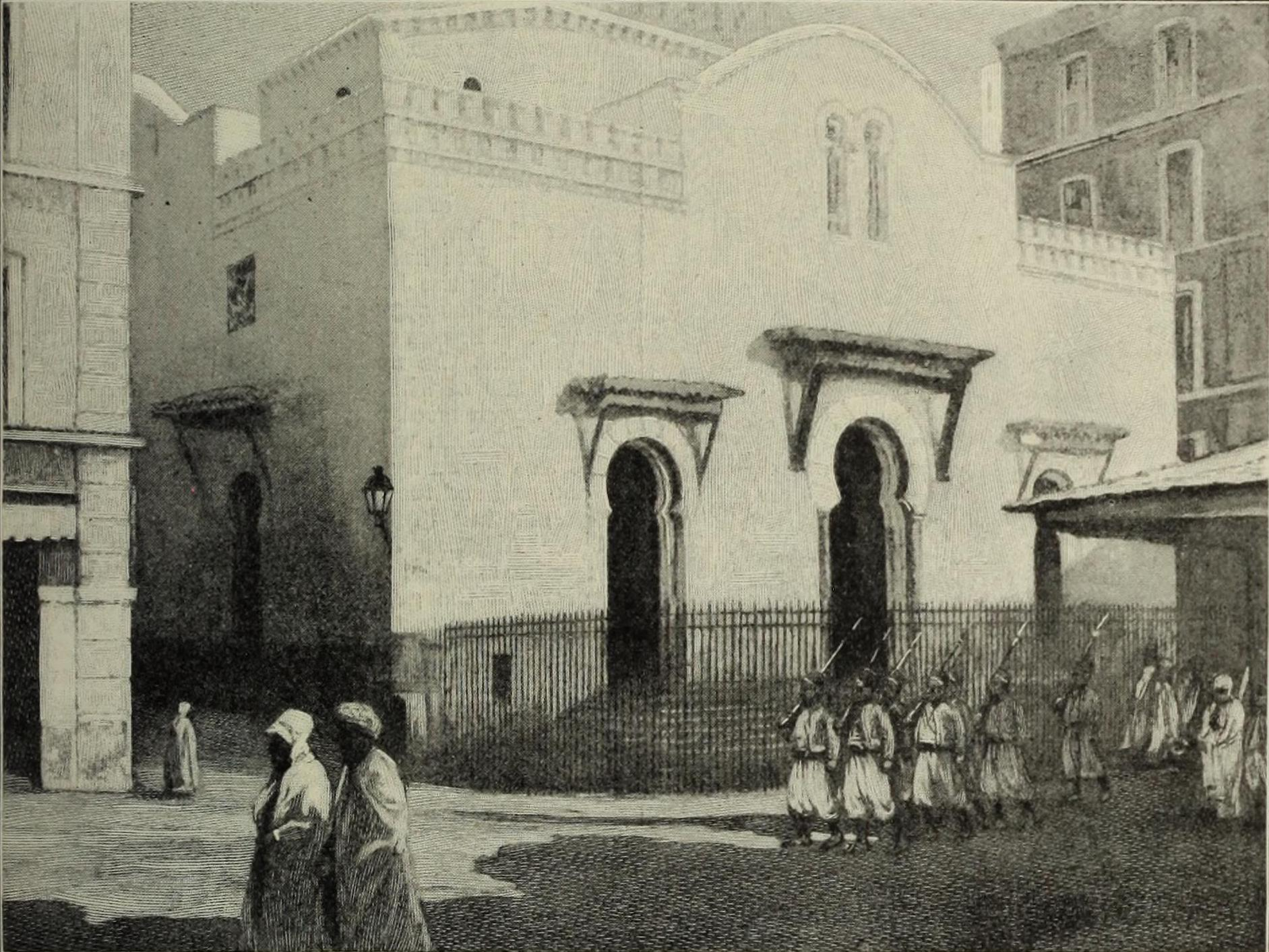
Great Synagogue of Algiers protected during the riots

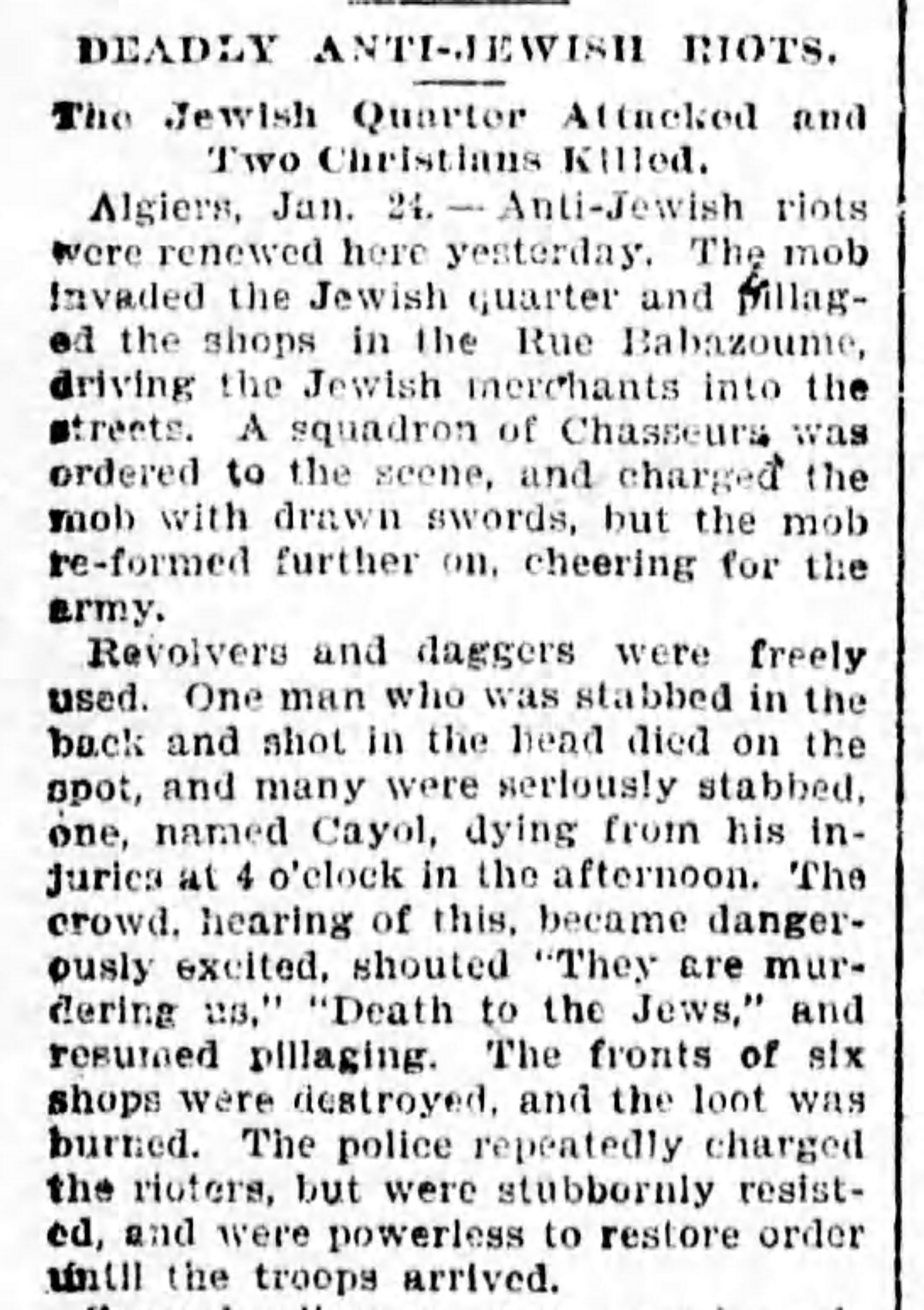
1898 report on the anti-Jewish riot in Algeria
