= List of synagogues in Algeria =

A partial list of synagogues in Algeria:

Name	Images	Location	Year	Remarks
Great Synagogue of Algiers		Casbah of Algiers	1865	Turned into a mosque in 1962
Chartres Square Synagogue		Casbah of Algiers		Demolished in 1837
Medée Street Synagogue		Casbah of Algiers	1852	Abandoned
Scipion Street Synagogue		Casbah of Algiers		Turned into a shop
Hara Synagogue		Bab El Oued, Algiers		Demolished in 1942
Shalom Lebar Synagogue		Bab El Oued, Algiers	1894	Demolished in 2025
Kaoua Synagogue		Belcourt, now Belouizdad, Algiers	1900	
Bologhine Synagogue		Saint-Eugène, now Bologhine, Algiers		In ruins
Old Batna Synagogue		Batna		Extant
New Batna Synagogue		Batna		Extant
Béjaïa Synagogue		Béjaïa		Turned into a school
Blida Synagogue		Blida	1863	Abandoned
La Ghriba Synagogue		Bône, now Annaba		Turned into a mosque in 1963
Constantine Synagogue		Constantine		Abandoned
Sanya Synagogue		Constantine		Not active as a synagogue today. The building is likely still standing but is either abandoned or has been repurposed
Sidi Mabrouk Synagogue		Constantine	1930	Turned into a mosque
Ghardaya Synagogue		Ghardaya		Abandoned
Laghouat Synagogue		Laghouat		Does not exist as a functioning synagogue and is likely repurposed or in ruins
Médéa Synagogue		Médéa		Divided into a tannery and a potter's studio
Miliana Synagogue		Miliana		Turned into a municipal gymnasium
Mostaganem Synagogue		Mostaganem		Abandoned
Great Synagogue of Oran		Oran	1918	Turned into a mosque in 1975
Old Synagogue of Orleansville		Orleansville, now Chlef		Destroyed by an earthquake
New Synagogue of Orleansville		Orleansville, now Chlef		
Philippeville Synagogue		Philippeville, now Skikda		Turned into a mosque
Relizane Synagogue		Relizane		Extant
Rabb Synagogue		Tlemcen		No longer functions as a synagogue and its building's status is complex, with some sources suggesting it's a cultural site or in disuse after the Jewish community left, while the tomb of the revered Rabbi Ephraim Aln-Kaoua nearby remains a significant pilgrimage spot for Jews
Grande Synagogue		Tlemcen		Turned into a school. Now closed
Sétif Synagogue		Sétif		Extant
Tiaret Synagogue		Tiaret	1900	Extant

== See also ==
- History of the Jews in Algeria
- List of synagogues in Morocco
- List of synagogues in Tunisia
