= Yosef ben David Renassia =

Rabbi, soldier, translator and educator

Yosef Ben David Renassia
- רבי יוסף גנאסיא
- Born: November 22, 1879; Constantine, French Algeria
- Died: 7 July 1962 (aged 82); Dimona, Israel
- Education: Etz Hayyim Yeshiva
- Children: 8
- Parents: David Renassia (father); Zehira Renassia (mother)

Yosef ben David Renassia (Hebrew: רבי יוסף גנאסיא; November 22, 1879–July 7, 1962) was a Jewish rabbi, soldier, translator, educator, writer, preservationist, and dayan from the Jewish community of Constantine. He served for many years as the chief rabbi of Constantine and worked in various educational roles until 1962. In 1962 he fled Algeria for Israel but before leaving he preserved many Constantine Jewish works of literature.

== Early life ==
Yosef ben David Renassia was born on November 22, 1879, in Constantine, French Algeria to David Renassia and Zeharia Zaffran. He was educated at the Etz Hayyim yeshiva in Constantine becoming a rabbi. He would later serve in the French military.

== Career ==
Renassia had many different jobs throughout his career. He worked for a time as the Rosh Yeshiva of the same Etz Hayyim yeshiva he went to. While here we would author several textbooks to teach the students and he would develop his populist, broad focused education philosophy. As part of this philosophy he would translate numerous works into both the common Judeo-Algerian-Arabic and into the more elitist literary language. Throughout his career he would be a major educator among Algeria's Jewish community and worked to separate Jewish and French national education in Algeria, as he was concerned over growing French cultural influence among Algerian Jews and was worried it would replace the Judeo-Arabic culture.

Renassia wrote over 130 books about Kabbalah, history, philosophy, and poetry while translating various texts into Judeo-Arabic and French.

The gradual exodus of the Jewish community of Constantine began in the 1950s eventually almost everybody moving the France and Israel. As the community dissolved Renassia used his connections with President of Israel, Izhak Ben-Zvi to help ensure the preservations of many Constantine Jewish works of literature, sending him several works to be preserved and receiving his help in preserving others. Without Renassia's efforts it is doubtful the works would have survived.

== Family ==
Renassia had two brothers, Benjamin and Yisrael as well as two sisters, Chanina and Ma-Leah. He would marry Rabbanit Rose Bandakiya and would have four sons and four daughters: David, Daniel, Yehuda, Yaakov, Helen, Julie, Cecille, and Fortuna Simcha.

== Death ==
Renassia died one and a half months after his aliyah in 1962 in Dimona. He was and still is buried in Israel.

== Works ==
- Ora V’Simcha – Sefer HaRambam
- Binyan Shlomo
- Ben David
- Zeved Tov
- Zachor V’Shamor
- Chelek Binyamin
- Yalda Milka
- Kibud Av V’Em
- Melechet Avoda
- Nishmat Kol Chai: Translation of the Six Orders of the Mishna
- Petirat Moshe
- Shai L’Mora
- Shir Ben David
- Tefilat Moshe
