= Judah Kalaẓ =

Algerian writer

Judah Kalaẓ (Khallaṣ) was a cabalist and moralist. He lived in Algeria, probably at Tlemçen, at the beginning of the sixteenth century. The surname Kalaẓ is derived from the Arabic khallaṣ (= "collector of taxes"). Kalaz was descended from a Spanish family, members of which settled in Algeria after the expulsion from Spain. A grandson of his, also named Judah, was rabbi at Tlemçen at the end of the sixteenth century. Kalaẓ was the author of a valuable work on ethics entitled Sefer ha-Musar (Constantinople, 1536–37). He frequently quotes the Zohar and other cabalistic works, which he held in great esteem.
