= Judeo-Algerian Arabic =

Judeo-Arabic variety of Algerian jews

- Native to: Algeria
- Region: France, Israel, possible small community in Algeria
- Ethnicity: Algerian Jews
- Language family: Afro-Asiatic: Semitic; Central Semitic; Arabic; Maghrebi Arabic; Algerian Arabic; Judeo-Algerian Arabic
- Dialects: Constantinian; Algiers; Djidjelli
- Writing system: Hebrew alphabet Arabic script

Language codes
- ISO 639-3: –

Judeo-Algerian Arabic, also known as Algerian Judeo-Arabic, is a Judeo-Arabic dialect based on Algerian Arabic. Today it is nearly extinct with only a few elderly speakers remaining. The language has a large amount of historical literature. It contained influence from several dialects of Arabic as well as from Hebrew and Aramaic.

== History ==
Historically, Algerian Jews would use Judeo-Algerian Arabic as everyday vocabulary while using Hebrew for religious purposes. They would also use several other languages such as the Berber languages, and Arabic. With the French conquest of Algeria in 1830, the Algerian Jews began to gradually take on French influence and language. With this process speeding up in 1870 when the Jewish population of Algeria were made French citizens by the Crémieux Decree. Early linguistic studies would occur in 1864, on the Algiers dialect of Judeo-Algerian Arabic would occur in 1912 and on the Constantine dialect would occur in 1988.

=== Decline ===
The decline of Judeo-Algerian Arabic would begin with the frenchification of the Algerian Jews as Judeo-Arabic began being replaced by French.

== Status ==
Today Judeo-Algerian Arabic is nearly extinct with a shrinking amount of elderly speakers remaining. This has made linguistic research difficult as the normal method of interviewing speakers is not possible. As such, the research being done now has increasingly shifted to analyzing Judeo-Algerian Arabic literature.

== Features ==
Judeo-Algerian Arabic is a member of the North African Judeo-Arabic group. It contains influence from Moroccan- and Tunisian Judeo-Arabic, Moroccan and Tunisian Arabic, French, Hebrew, Aramaic and to a lesser extent Spanish and Italian. Similar to many other Jewish languages, Judeo-Algerian Arabic uses the Hebrew script instead of the Arabic script more popular in Algeria. Judeo-Algerian Arabic also contains several conservative features abandoned in regular Algerian Arabic. Judeo-Algerian Arabic had different dialects for different Algerian Jewish population with there being dialects for the cities of Constantine and Algiers.

All three Judeo-Algerian Arabic dialects have a large reduction in the amount of short vowels, with the Djidjelli dialect only having one short vowel.

In a study of a 19th Judeo-Algerian Arabic text, it was found 16% of the words in the text were of Hebrew origin. New words are made by combining Arabic conjugations with Hebrew root words showing a high degree of linguistic exchange and integration.

== Dialects ==
Judeo-Algerian Arabic is divided into three dialects based on the dialect spoken in the cities of Constantine, Algiers, and Djidjelli.

=== Constantinian ===
The dialect of Constantine known as Constantinian is characterized by conservative linguistic features and the preservation of archaic traits.

=== Algiers dialect ===
The book Perah Shoshan which is an important source of Judeo-Algerian Arabic is written in the Algiers dialect.

== Usage ==
There is a large amount of Judeo-Arabic literary texts, and Judeo-Algerian Arabic is no exception. Today the study of Judeo-Algerian Arabic texts is the primary method used by linguists to study Judeo-Algerian Arabic. These texts include bible translations, liturgy, non biblical translation, newspapers and more. There are samples of Judeo-Algerian Arabic available online.

== Sample text ==
Judeo-Arabic	English
האדול הומאן אצלאטן והאדול הומאן דוד חזקיה משיח דניאל חנניה מישאל עזריה	These are the sultans; and these are David, Hezekiah, Masiah, Daniel, Hanaiah, Mishael, and Azariah
קאל לפסוק ווקר אילא אובוך ואילא אומך	the verse says: "Honor your father and your mother"
קאל לפסוק ”את ה’ אלהיך תירא“ חב יקול תהאב ותכ’אף אילא אללא אילאהך	and the verse said “You shall fear the Lord, your God”
