= Ben Farès Mosque =

Mosque in Algiers, Algeria

- مسجد ابن فارس
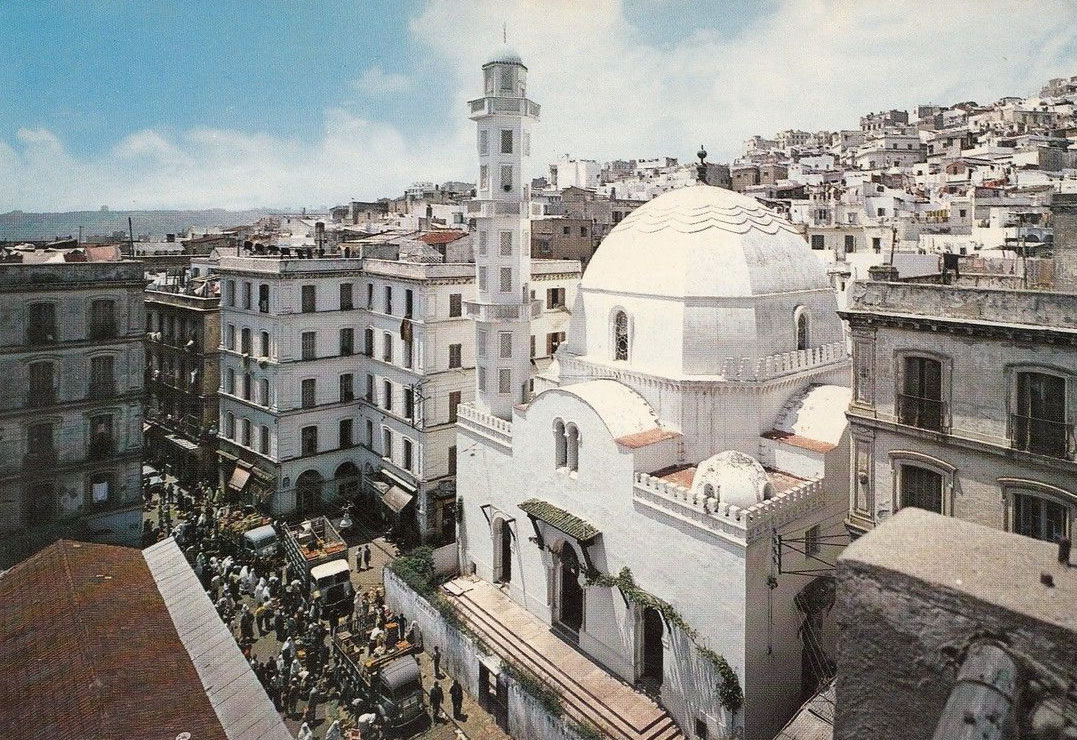
- The mosque in 1975

- Location of the mosque in Algiers

Religion
- Affiliation: Islam
- Ecclesiastical or organisational status: Synagogue (1865–1960); Mosque (since 1962)
- Status: Active

Location
- Location: Place Randon, Casbah, Algiers
- Country: Algeria
- Interactive map of Ben Farès Mosque
- Coordinates: 36°47′2″N 3°3′33″E

Architecture
- Architect: Pierre Guiauchain
- Type: Synagogue architecture
- Style: Moorish
- Founder: Napoleon III (as a synagogue)
- Completed: 1865 (as a synagogue); 1962 (as a mosque)

Specifications
- Capacity: 1,100 worshippers (as a synagogue)
- Dome: 1
- Minaret: 1
- Materials: Granite

The Ben Farès Mosque, also known as Djamaa Ben Farès (Arabic: مسجد ابن فارس) and formerly as Djamâa Lihoud (Jewish Mosque), is a mosque located on Place Randon in Algiers, the capital of Algeria. The mosque is located in the Casbah of Algiers, a UNESCO World Heritage Site.

Built by Napoleon III in 1865 as a synagogue and named as the Great Synagogue of Algiers (French: Synagogue de Rue Randon), the structure was abandoned by Jews in 1962, during the independence of Algeria, and repurposed as a mosque.

== History ==
The site of the mosque holds deep historical layers. Around 1400, it was originally the location of the medieval Sidi Al-Harbi Mosque (Djamaâ Sidi Al-Harbi). Following the fall of Granada in 1492, the Andalusian theologian and merchant El Hadj Abdelaziz Ben Farès settled in the neighborhood, giving his name to the area and the rebuilt structure.

In 1842, the French colonial administration declared the old mosque alienated due to dilapidations and subsequently ceded the plot to the Jewish community in 1845. The Grand Synagogue of Algiers was constructed on this site and inaugurated in 1865. Following Algeria's independence in 1962, the building was converted into a mosque, recovering its historical Andalusian name as the Ibn Fares Mosque.

Supported by funding from the French government, large synagogues were constructed in Algiers, Oran, and Setif, to establish a public Jewish presence in parallel to Roman Catholic cathedrals and grand mosques. In 1839, the French government tore down several buildings and synagogues in the Jewish quarter as part of urban renewal, promising in return to provide FF120,000 toward the construction of a grand synagogue. It took 25 years but a new building was finally inaugurated on September 19, 1865, on the site of an ancient mosque on Place Randon.

On 11 December 1960, Algerian rebels battling French rule took over the synagogue. Protesting against a visit by General de Gaulle, Algerian rebels were fired upon by Jews from nearby balconies, inducing them to attack the synagogue; the rebels succeeded in raising a green and white flag above the building. After two days of rioting, French forces restored order, though the synagogue itself was abandoned.

In 1962, the former synagogue was converted into the Ben Farès Mosque. Much of the exterior of the former synagogue was preserved, with the only major change being the addition of an octagonal minaret. Regarding the interior, all Jewish symbols were removed and the Torah ark was replaced by a mihrab. The building is sometimes referred to as the Mosque of the Jews.

== Architecture ==
Designed by Pierre Guiauchain in the Moorish style, the square interior with a large dome and horse-shoe arches accommodate 900 men, plus 200 women in the second-floor balconies. A chandelier hung from the central dome, with light streaming in from stained-glass windows. Plaques on the walls saluted community benefactors, and in 1922 the synagogue added two large plaques on either side of the ark memorializing community members who died in World War I. The ark housed many scrolls, including a Sefer Torah from Spain, completed centuries before the synagogue was built. An organ was added at some point. The façade faces the market plaza with a large door flanked by two columns and two side doors, with a wide granite staircase.

== See also ==
- Islam in Algeria
- List of mosques in Algeria
- List of synagogues in Algeria
