= Crémieux Decree =

1870 French decree regarding Algerian Jews

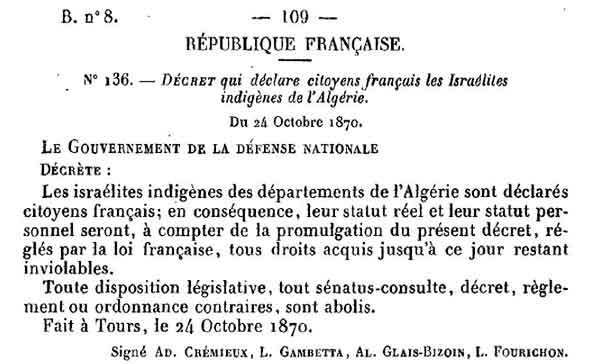
The decree

The Crémieux Decree (French: Décret Crémieux; IPA: [kʁemjø]) was a law that granted French citizenship to the majority of the Jewish population in French Algeria (around 35,000). Signed by the Government of National Defense on 24 October 1870 during the Franco-Prussian War, it was named after French-Jewish lawyer and Minister of Justice Adolphe Crémieux.

The decree automatically made the native Algerian Jews French citizens, while their Muslim Arab and Berber neighbors were excluded and remained under the second-class indigenous status outlined in the Native code (code de l'Indigénat). The decree did not grant citizenship to the Berber Mozabite Jews, who only acquired "common law civil status" and French citizenship in 1961, over ninety years later.

Muslim Algerians could on paper apply individually for French citizenship, but this required that they formally renounce Islam and its laws and their requests were additionally very seldom accepted. That set the scene for deteriorating relations between the Muslim and Jewish communities, with tensions increased by the colonial administration's discrimination between natives and citizens. Seeing a fellow Algerian become a first-class citizen while being left as a second-class citizen made them suspect of collaboration with the colonial authorities as harkis, and strongly divided locals.

This eventually proved fateful in the 1954–1962 Algerian War, where suspects of French collaboration were seen as enemies of the revolution and traitors of the people and the nation, after which the vast majority of the Jews of Algeria emigrated to France.

== History ==
Jews first migrated to Algeria during the Roman period. The Spanish inquisition later led to a huge influx of Jewish migration, who most Algerian Jews are descended from. France conquered Algeria in 1830–1834. France became focused on assimilating colonized people into French citizens, and a sénatus-consulte in 1865 revised citizenship laws to allow indigenous Algerians to apply for French citizenship. But Algerian culture prided itself on its customary practices, and as a result application rates were low. Many European Jews lived in France, and so the French believed that Algerian Jews would be more likely to assimilate due to having Sephardic (Portuguese Jews, like Crémieux's mother) and also Ashkenazi relatives in France. Thus, Jews gained recognition in France as a means of control: the French government having realized that, by enabling Ashkenazi practices, they could appoint chief Rabbis with a duty to "inculcate unconditional obedience to the laws, loyalty to France, and the obligation to defend it". France had already given the Sephardic Jews of France citizenship in 1790, and almost two years after, in September 1791, granted citizenship to their Ashkenazi co-religionists who were seen as less French at the time. By granting citizenship to Algerian Jews, the French believed the local Jews would forgo their traditions, and become loyal to France. The intent was rapid acculturation of Algerian Jews into French Jews.

It was signed as Decree 136 of 1870 by Adolphe Crémieux as Minister of Justice, Léon Gambetta as Minister of the Interior, and Léon Martin Fourichon as Minister of the Navy and the Colonies. These ministers were members of the provisional Government of National Defense (based in Tours, since France was at war and Paris was besieged. The Muslim revolt of 1871 created distrust of the indigenous non-Jews, as it established that they would not respect French authority. This amplified French desire to attempt the assimilation of Algerian Jews over other indigenous communities who, it was felt, would be more resistant.

At the same time, the naturalization regime in French Algeria was confirmed by Decree 137, which stated that Algerian Muslims were not French citizens. The aim was to maintain the status quo, the sovereignty of France over its North African colonies. Five years later, in 1875, this was confirmed in the framework of the Native code (code de l'indigénat).

Decrees 136 and 137 were published in Official Gazette of the City of Tours (Bulletin officielle de la ville de Tours) on 7 November 1870.

=== After effects of the decree ===
Within a generation, most Algerian Jews came to speak French and embrace French culture in its entirety. Conflicts between Sephardic Jewish religious law and French law troubled community members as they attempted to navigate a legal system at odds with their established practice. The French army's control over civilian life in Algeria was limited, as Algerian Jews were legally viewed as equal to other French citizens. The Crémieux Decree also heightened French feelings of racial superiority in Algeria. Many French colonists refused to accept Jews as citizens, leading to a wave of antisemitism that continued to worsen well into the mid-1900s. This led to a divide after the 1882 conquest of M'zab when the French government categorized Southern Algerian Jews and Northern Algerian Jews as distinct groups, recognizing only the rights of the latter, while treating the former as indigenous Algerians.

Following the fall of France and the formation of the Vichy government, Interior Minister Marcel Peyrouton abolished the decree on 7 October 1940, at the same time as the new government promoted antisemitic laws in metropolitan France.

After the Anglo-American landings in Algeria and Morocco in November 1942, Vichyist Admiral François Darlan was initially kept in power by the Allies and did not abrogate the laws of Vichy. After Darlan's assassination on December 24, 1942, General Henri Giraud was appointed French Civil and Military Commander-in-Chief and, on March 14, 1943, he revoked the antisemitic laws of Vichy and reinstated the Crémieux decree. The Decree remained in effect until Algeria won its independence in 1962 and most of the Algerian Jewish population relocated to France. More than 80% of Algerian Jews (110,000 out of about 130,000) opted for France, leaving Algeria en masse, not because they were persecuted there as Jews but because they had so deeply internalized their "Frenchness" that they considered their destiny linked to that of the French.

== Text of the decree ==
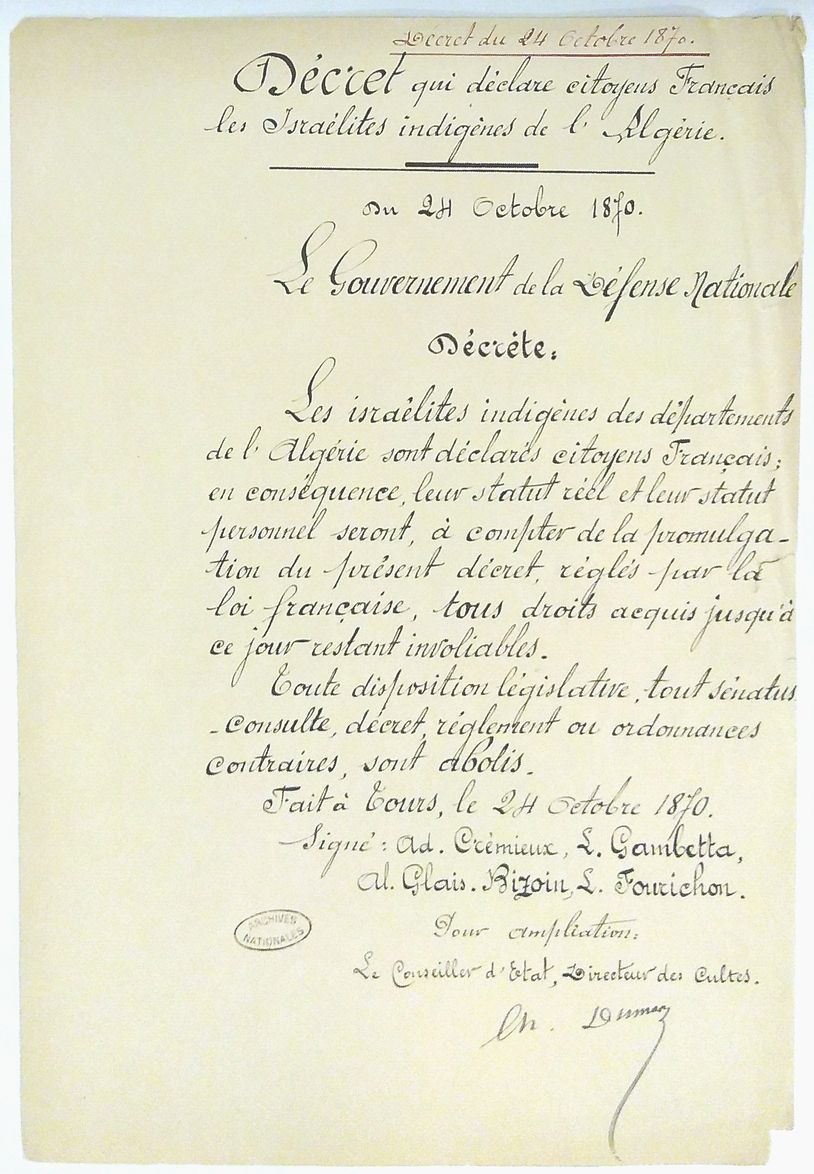

French Republic
No. 136. - Declaring the indigenous Jews of Algeria French citizens.
24 October 1870.

The Government of National Defense Decrees:

The indigenous Jews of the departments of Algeria are declared French citizens; therefore, their actual status and personal status will, after the promulgation of this decree, be settled by French law, any rights acquired to date remaining inviolable.

Any legislative provision, any Sénatus-consulte, decree, regulation or ordinance to the contrary is abolished.

Done at Tours, 24 October 1870

Signed Ad. Crémieux, L. Gambetta, Al. Glais-Bizoin, L. Fourichon

== See also ==
- Economic antisemitism § Restrictions on occupations and professions
- Divide and rule
  - Salami slicing tactics
  - Model minority myth
  - Rwandan genocide § Pre-independent Rwanda and the origins of Hutu, Tutsi and Twa groups
  - Wedge issue
- Kabyle myth
- Social exclusion
