= History of USM Alger (1937–1962) =

Algerian professional association football club

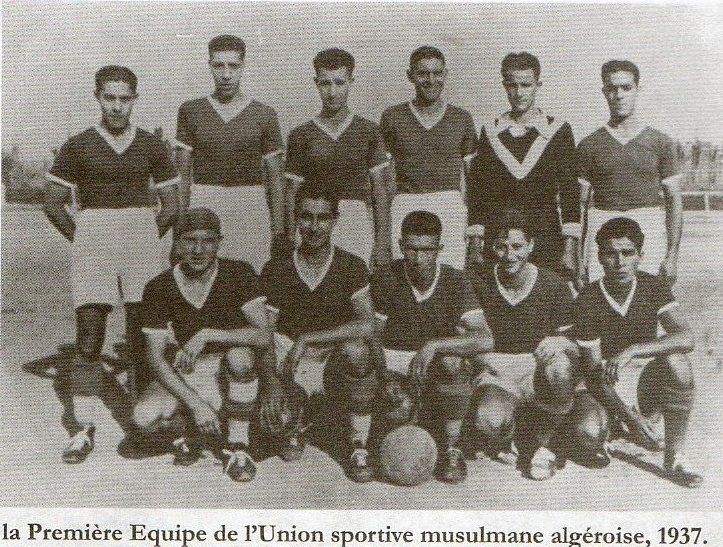
USM Alger's team during their first season 1937–38 with From Left to Right: Stand Up : Hamid Bahri – Mohamed Hamdi – Youssef Choudar – Benyoucef Benhoura – Franck Bailek (GK) – M'hamed Idriss. Sitting Smain – Mokrane – M'hamed Nasri – Ortula – Maâmar Haouari.

The history of Union Sportive Muslmane Algéroise between 1937 and 1962, commonly referred to as USM Alger or simply USMA, is an Algerian professional association football club based in Algiers, as a Muslim football club under French colonial rule. It quickly becomes a symbol of national identity and pride for Algerians. USMA competes in the lower divisions of the Algiers League. World War II disrupts football activity. Despite limited resources and colonial repression, the club survives and maintains strong community support.

A difficult period marked by discrimination against Muslim clubs. USMA occasionally reaches the top division of the Algiers League but is disadvantaged compared to European teams. It becomes a gathering point for nationalist youth.

1954: The Algerian War of Independence begins. Several players and officials join or support the FLN (National Liberation Front). USMA withdraws from all official competitions following an FLN directive, along with other Muslim clubs, as a protest against colonial control. The club enters a period of silent resistance.

1956–1962: No official activity. However, USMA remains alive in people's memory. Many former players and leaders participate in the independence struggle; some are imprisoned or martyred. In July 5, 1962: Algeria gains independence. USMA is revived and reenters national competition, becoming part of the new era of Algerian football.

== Before establishment ==
By the end of the 19th century and the beginning of the 20th, football began to expand and spread globally. The first international football federation (FIFA) was founded in Paris in 1904, followed by the creation of various regional football bodies in Europe. Its influence soon reached the Maghreb countries Algeria, Tunisia, and Morocco. In Algeria, the sport was first introduced by European colonial associations, which established football clubs such as the Club des Joyeusetés in 1894, Club de la Chapelle Blanche in 1904, Association Sportive de Blida in 1905, C.S.C. Philippeville in 1910 and Association Gymnastique de la Vieille Garde Algérienne was founded in 1917, among other clubs managed exclusively by Europeans.

Muslim youth were prohibited from practicing football, and the sport remained limited to a small elite among the European settlers and colonial administrators. However, a small group of Algerian youth sought to establish clubs that would allow them to play football in an organized manner. Their aim was not merely recreational, but social and political as well affirming their identity and resisting colonial exclusion. Amid these restrictions, several Muslim led clubs were established with a reformist and nationalist orientation: Mouloudia Club Algéroise in 1921, Club sportif constantinois in 1926, Union sportive musulmane Oranaise in 1926, Union Sportive Musulmane de Sétif in 1933, Union Sportive Musulmane Blidéenne in 1936. Barely had the first four decades of the past century passed when the number of Algerian clubs with a national and Islamic character had grown significantly across the country. This number continued to rise steadily until the mid-1950s, when all sporting activities were suspended under colonial rule by order of the Liberation Revolution.

These early clubs were more than just sports institutions. They were platforms for national awareness, cultural resistance, and social reform. Their players and members often came from reformist circles students in Quranic schools and disciples of Islamic reform movements. The clubs were deeply intertwined with Algeria's Islamic identity and national cause, forming a unique fusion of sport and political consciousness. Under colonial rule, football was organized by the French Federation (F.F.F.A.), which imposed strict and exclusionary rules. Still, by the mid-1930s, several Algerian clubs had become strong enough to compete in five regional leagues (Algiers, Oran, Constantine, Tunisia, and France), leading to national finals in Algiers. Clubs were then divided under the Fédération sportive et gymnique du travail (F.S.G.T.), which classified and ranked clubs under colonial standards.

=== Early years ===
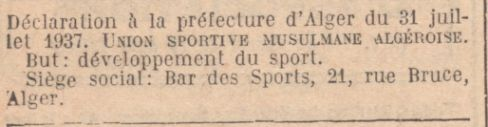
Union sportive musulmane algéroise.

In July 1935, Omar Aichoun and Mustapha Kaoui, both merchants of jute bags, decided to create an exclusively Muslim sports association in which no European would appear. At the time, the National Movement, led by Étoile Nord-Africaine of Emir Khalid ibn Hashim, grandson of Emir Abdelkader, ran out of steam while the creation of the PPA (Parti du peuple algérien), spiritual father, was organized. of the FLN, Aichoun and Kaoui, join the popular effervescence. They frequent the activists of the National Movement, many in the district of the Casbah and hear about the need to create sports clubs, the ideal framework to bring together Algerian youth. The increasingly seasoned national movement is pushing for the creation of sports associations.

In 1935, two determined men intensified their contacts with the support of Arezki Meddad, father of future martyr Ourida Meddad. Their choice of leadership fell upon Ali Lahmar, known as Ali Zaid, a future martyr of the liberation war of Liberation, along with Sid Ahmed Kemmat. These men formed the first executive committee of USM Alger, with Ali Zaid serving as president. The honorary presidency was entrusted to Omar Aichoun and Arezki Meddad.

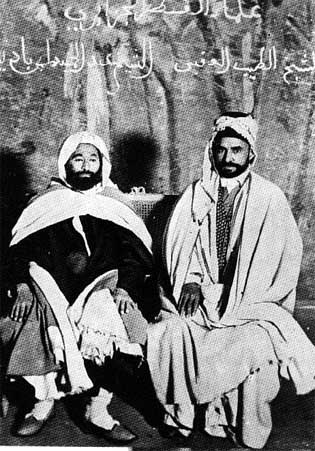
Tayeb el-Oqbi right with Abdelhamid Ben Badis.

In addition to their nationalist and sporting efforts, Omar Aichoun and Mustapha Kaoui were active members of the Nadi Ettaraki (Circle of Progress), an association established under the French 1901 Law on Associations. Its headquarters were located at 9, Place du Gouvernement in Algiers (now Place des Martyrs). The Circle was closely associated with the Islamic Reform Movement (El Islah), led by Sheikh Tayeb El Okbi. Notably, his son Djamel El Okbi would later become a goalkeeper for USM Alger.

Concerned that engaging in sports might conflict with Islamic principles, the founders consulted Sheikh Tayeb El Okbi, who not only reassured them but also blessed the creation of the club and offered his full encouragement. For administrative formalities and to obtain the colonial authorities’ approval, the founders approached the Secretary General of MC Alger, who generously provided them with a copy of the club statutes to serve as a model.

At that time, the Algerian youth were cut off from playing football or any other sport freely, according to their preferences. Opportunities to practice were scarce the playing fields were the only space for creativity. No one was expected to take responsibility or open up prospects for them. The Wilaya of Algiers alone could not meet the demands of the large number of young people eager for sports activities. Well known sports figures like Ahmed Kemmat, Ali Zaid, and Arezki Meddad would often use their own money to purchase balls and equipment so that these youths could continue practicing their hobbies without interruption. As Mr. Ahmed Kemmat continues:

In 1937, Algiers had only Mouloudia or rather, the Casbah had only Mouloudia. The rest of Algiers belonged to clubs like Red Star, AS Saint Eugène, RU Alger, Union Sportive d'Alger, and others mostly composed of French settlers. Rue Salluste, behind the Church of Saint Vincent de Paul (now Ketchaoua Mosque), was where neighborhood youth wandered, idle due to forced inactivity. Barbed wire hadn't yet closed off the city streets you could enter the Casbah, leave it, and play while waiting and maybe it was the appearance of someone like Kemmat, with his proposal to create another Muslim club in Algiers a club full of values that opened up the possibility of launching into the struggle later on.

In an interview with Ahmed Kemmat, published in the magazine AFRIC Sports, issue no. 18 (June–July 1987), he recounted his deep belief in this cause. As one of the original founders of USM Alger, he spoke about the birth of the idea, which emerged around 1937, and how it gradually became a concrete decision moving from Rue Salluste to other neighborhoods.

There was a neighborhood team, the sports club of (Salluste Street), which impressed us. We were Lahmar, known as Ali Zaid, Zemmouri Ali, Slimani Ali, Bennour Saïd, Meddad Arezki and myself a group of neighborhood friends living through the difficult times of colonization. We often discussed everything, life in general and little by little, we were drawn to sport. The example of Muslim clubs at the time inspired us especially Union Sportive Musulmane Oranaise, founded in 1928, especially for its name. We had a burning desire to do something similar, and this desire would grow every time the topic came up.

I knew all the ins and outs of such an operation. My frequent contacts with Mouloud Djazouli, an active leader of Mouloudia Club of Algiers, had taught me a lot. I got to work immediately. We had to prepare the statutes and file the application with the prefecture. No sooner said than done the file was submitted and registered under the number 1687, if my memory is correct! The only issue that troubled the colonial administration was the word "Muslim" it was frowned upon. We discussed and argued both sides, and in the end, the approval was granted. On July 5, 1937, the club was officially created: USMA was born.

Its headquarters was located on Rue du Divan. The first board of directors included the names already mentioned, with others joining later such as Amrani Abdelkader, Hammaz Omar, Zennagui Mohamed, Lakhal Omar, Basta Mohamed Ouali, and Cherifi Ali. The first president was Meddad Arezki, the owner of the neighborhood café. When he was told, dear Arezki, ‘he was over the moon!

— The idea of founding a club first took shape in Sid Ahmed Kemmat's mind in May 1937.

=== The Birth of USM Alger: Between Oral Memory and Official Records ===
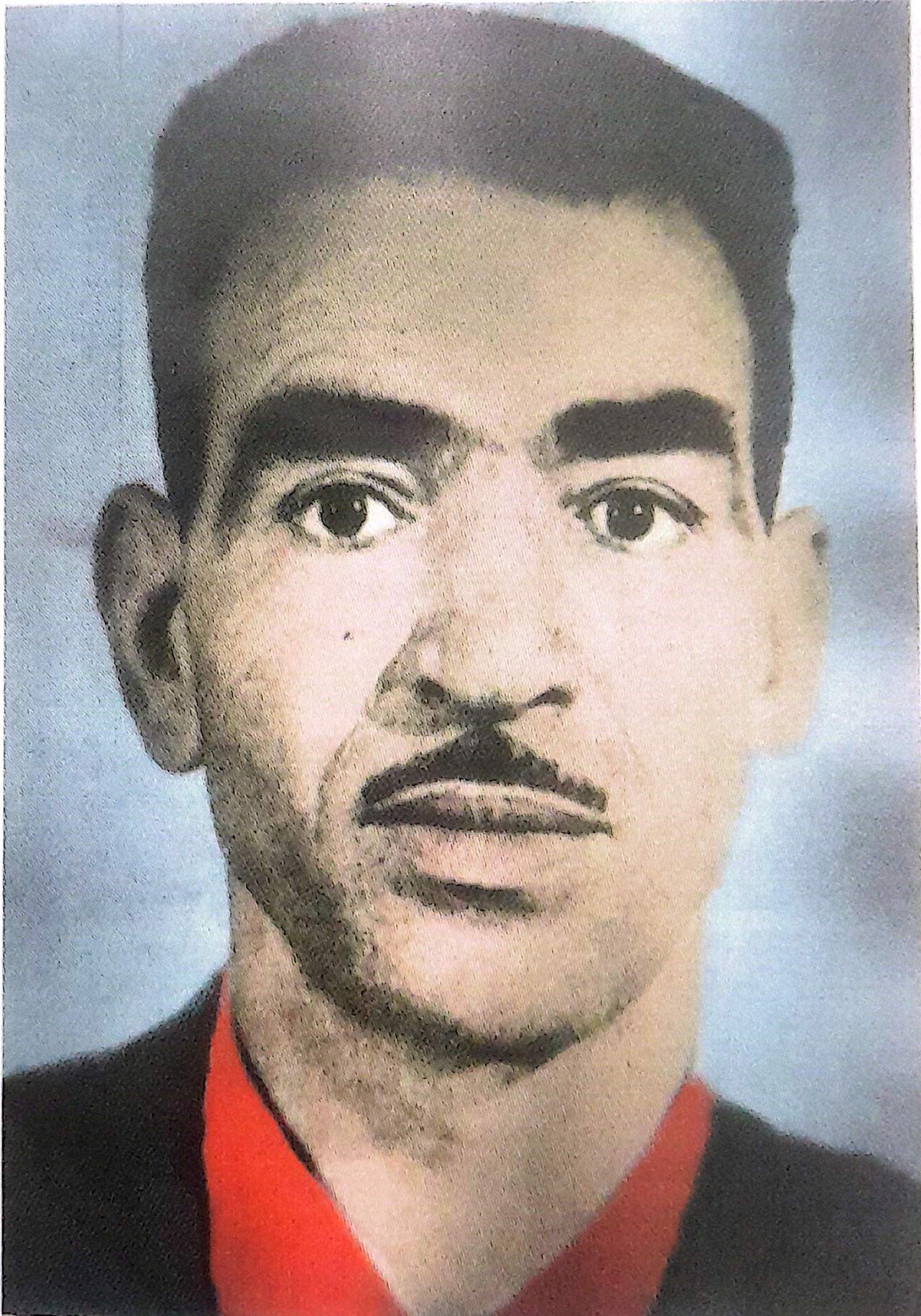
Ali Zaid, known as Lahmar, was the first president, serving from its founding on July 5, 1937, until 1938.

Arezki Meddad served as president from 1938 to 1942.

Despite the differing accounts regarding the identity of USM Alger's first president, the official document dated July 5, 1937, addressed to the Algiers prefecture, clearly confirms that Ali Zaid who would later become a martyr of the Algerian War of Independence was the first official and administrative president of the club. The same document indicates that Arezki Meddad held the role of honorary president, suggesting his symbolic and social influence without occupying a formal administrative position. However, press sources particularly the Alger républicain newspaper dated June 20, 1963, state that the club was founded through the efforts of Arezki Meddad (brother of Saïd Meddad, a later president), martyr Ali Zaid, and former player Mohamed Hamdi. This version relies heavily on oral testimony from former club members and was written nearly 29 years after the club's founding, reflecting the influence of post-independence memory and narrative construction. From these findings, it is clear that the club's founding unfolded in two distinct phases.

An unofficial, grassroots phase that began in early 1937, driven primarily by Arezki Meddad, whose café in Rue Salluste (Casbah of Algiers) served as the informal headquarters for the founding meetings. A formal, legally recognized phase initiated with the club's official registration with colonial authorities in July 1937, under the presidency of Ali Zaid, in compliance with French colonial legal requirements for associations. Most of the founding members and early club activists were young men from the Casbah, aged between 16 and 20. Their unity stemmed from shared social and political convictions, as well as a collective desire to create a Muslim Algerian sports club that reflected their identity and resisted the dominance of colonial sports institutions.

founded clubs in Algeria, it was not the first such club established in the country. Several Muslim oriented or Muslim European mixed sports clubs preceded it during the Colonial era, including: Union Sportive d'Alger (USA): Founded in 1919 by a group of Algerians and French settlers. Its headquarters was located on Rue du Soudan in Algiers. Union Athlétique (UA): Founded in 1921 by both Muslim Algerians and Europeans, and based near Valièze Slope (Pente Valièze), Algiers. Union Sportive Musulmane (USM): Created in 1927 exclusively by Muslim Algerians. Its base was located near Rue de Lyon, Algiers.

Despite the similar naming conventions Union, Sportive, Musulmane there is no conclusive evidence of a direct organizational, legal or historical link between any of these earlier clubs and USMA, founded officially in July 1937. USMA appears to have been established independently, although inspired by the nationalist and social spirit shared by those earlier clubs. This matter was specifically addressed in a report published by Algérie Actualité magazine (issue dated June 13–19, 1971), under the headline: "L'Union Sportive Musulmane" To Awaken National Spirit. The article emphasized that, while naming overlaps were common during the colonial period partly to express Muslim identity within a restricted legal environment USMA had its own genesis, driven by a group of young men from the Casbah in 1937, notably Ali Zaid, Arezki Meddad and others, with no confirmed continuity from the older organizations.

=== Club Colors: From Variety to National Symbolism ===
When USM Alger was first established, the club's founders chose light burgundy red (purplish red) and black as the official team colors. This combination was a stylistic choice in line with trends seen in several football clubs of the era, reflecting elegance and strength. However, due to the complex realities of colonial Algeria marked by political repression, material scarcity, and administrative restrictions USMA did not always play in its chosen colors. At various times, the team adopted alternative kits based on availability and circumstance.

Other color variations included: red and white, red and black, Plain red, or other temporary combinations. These adaptations were not ideological but practical driven by limited access to equipment and the financial constraints facing Muslim clubs under colonial rule. A defining moment in the club's identity came in the wake of the May 1, 1945, demonstrations in Algiers, particularly in the neighborhoods of Soustara and the Lower Casbah, where several members of the USMA community lost their lives. These protests were part of a broader wave of unrest and national resistance and preceded the infamous massacres of May 8, 1945, in which tens of thousands of Algerians were killed across the country.

In tribute to the martyrs from within its own community and across Algeria, USM Alger made a conscious decision to solidify its visual identity. From that moment forward, the club officially adopted: red symbolizing blood and sacrifice, and black representing mourning and resistance. Together, red and black became more than just colors, they were a declaration of national dignity, memory, and struggle. These colors came to embody the soul of the club and have remained a symbol for both players and fans ever since.

==== 1937–38 season ====
Sandra (GK), Boualem Midah (GK), Simon Grangeon, Ali Chouidi, Mohamed Hamdi, Mouloud Laazizi, Hamid Benali, Hamid Bahri, Ali Slimani, Ali Zemmouri, Ibrahim Boudar, Mohamed Nadji, Omar Lakhal, Si M'hamed, Maamar Ould Rouis, Bachir Kouach, Mohamed Oulmi, Saïd Saïd, Naseri Alasnami, Ramadan Bouarour, Mohamed Bouarroub.

— Squad of 1937–38 USM Alger season.

The emergence of the Union Sportive Muslmane Algéroise on the football scene was like a lightning bolt it quickly made a name for itself thanks to the arrival of a large number of Algerian players, especially those coming from other clubs, notably from European teams active in Algeria at the time. However, this rapid rise was met with resistance from the colonial football league authorities, who refused to grant these incoming players the A license, which was required to participate in official matches. Instead, they were only given a B license, limiting them to playing in friendly games. This administrative obstacle delayed the club's official entry into the Third Division until the following season, in accordance with the existing regulations.

While waiting for its legal and sporting status to be regularized, the team played its first season in a trial competition organized by the Workers’ Sports Association, which oversaw alternative leagues for clubs with national or working class character. In the meantime, the club played its first competitive football season in what was known as the Championnat d'Alger de la F.S.G.T, also referred to as the Championnat du Comité Directeur à Alger. This competition was essentially equivalent to the Fourth Division and was organized under the authority of the colonial league management in Algiers.

During that season, USM Alger was placed in a group that included the following teams: JSL Belfort, JS Blida, U Saloumbier FM, JSO Hussein Dey, CP Harrach, PS Orléanvilles and JSO Maison Carrée. According to the competition's rules, each club was required to participate with two teams: a first team and a reserve team, with fixtures scheduled for both on matchdays. During this inaugural season, USM Alger hosted its home matches either at the Bainem Stadium or at the Belfort Stadium, depending on availability and logistical considerations. The first match was on October 17, 1937, against JSO Hussein Dey and it ended in a draw.

Thanks to the team's strong performance in this trial championship finishing in second place with a respectable points total and due to structural reforms introduced by the League Algiers Football Association and the French Amateur Football Federation (FFFA), which expanded the number of teams across different levels of competition, USM Alger earned well deserved promotion to the Third Division, the following season. USM Alger are allowed to participate in this competition by paying symbolic contributions for the following cup tournaments: the F.S.G.T. Cup, the SAFRAN Cup (reserved for companies), and the SENDRA Cup (for the reserve group B). This group may also take part alongside teams from the corporate and institutional championships affiliated with the ‘Algerian Working Class Organization’ (ALGERIE OUVRIÈRE). All of these are considered local cups, supervised by corporative teams, with a participation fee of 10 francs.

==== 1938–39 season ====
Following the strong performance displayed by USM Alger in the previous season, the club officially entered the competitive scene within Group B of the Third Division Championship of the Algiers League. The team approached this new challenge with high morale and great determination to continue its upward trajectory in Algerian football. Group B consisted of the following six teams: SC Miliana, RC Koléa, ECS Cherchell, ALB Olympique, JS Rovigo and USM Alger. In preparation for the upcoming season's championship, several meetings were held by the club's board of directors and the football committee. These meetings aimed to renew various management structures and address any shortcomings observed in the previous season. Additionally, sessions were held with both new and returning players to complete the signing of annual licenses and to organize the necessary physical and technical preparations. A series of friendly matches was also scheduled as part of the pre-season training program.

At the end of the season, USM Alger secured second place with a total of 24 points after 10 rounds. These strong results qualified the team to participate in the promotion play-offs, which were organized to determine the overall champion of the Third Division across all groups and, ultimately, to decide promotion to the higher level. As part of these decisive matches, USM Alger faced the following teams in classification encounters: ECS Cherchell, Bouira AC and Club Alger. In the promotion play-offs, USM Alger achieved excellent results: victory over ECS Cherchell, a win against Bouira AC, and a draw with Club Alger. These performances earned USM Alger second place in the overall standings, making the club the runner-up of the Algiers League Third Division. This distinction officially qualified the team for promotion to the Second Division, marking a significant step forward in its competitive journey.

It is worth noting that the match against ECS Cherchell, originally scheduled to be played at the Blida Stadium, was marked by incidents that reflected the hostile intentions of the colonial authorities toward the club. The match was canceled the first time despite the presence of both teams, after the match commissioner invoked a regulation from French colonial law, claiming that the USM Alger did not include three European players, as allegedly required. Following a formal complaint filed by USM Alger and a review of the commissioner's report, the league was compelled to postpone the match and reschedule it multiple times. It was finally played in Algiers, at the Le bon Stadium.

=== World War II period ===
In light of the serious current events and the recall of many club officials and players to military service, the French Football Association has decided to cancel, until further notice, all official championship competitions, as well as the Coupe de France and the North African Cup. This measure will be lifted if the international crisis is resolved peacefully.

— A paragraph from the newspaper "Le tell", issue 2, September 1939, on the tongue of the French Football Federation.

All competitions were supposed to start normally, and USM Alger was expected to begin its new chapter by competing in the Second Division championship. Everyone was awaiting the league schedule, which was either about to be published or had already been published. However, things did not go as planned, as World War II broke out an event that had a deeply negative impact on all sectors, especially on the management of clubs and teams. This was primarily due to the shortage of human resources, as the situation of the teams became unstable following the colonial government's declaration of general mobilization (la mobilisation générale) and the mass conscription of young people, including players from various teams competing in the Algiers League and other regional leagues.

As a result of these circumstances, the senior championship in particular and other competitions in general were completely paralyzed. These competitions usually began before mid-September, but up to September 29, 1939, only a few friendly football tournaments were organized, primarily to encourage ongoing conscription efforts. These events were mainly held among Honor Division teams and youth categories up to the intermediate level. With the outbreak of World War II, conditions became even harsher than before. Official competitions were suspended and replaced by a symbolic or mock championship, in which USM Alger found itself facing heavyweight teams.

==== 1939–40 season ====
1939–40 League Algiers Standings

During the months of September and October, the Algiers League (L.A.F.A.) held several sessions, meetings, and discussions with club representatives to assess the possibility of continuing competitions, to consider organizational reforms suited to the new situation, and to find appropriate solutions, including the adoption of new regulations. It was agreed to maintain football activity in the form of a unified transitional championship called the Championnat de guerre de la Ligue d'Alger. This competition would bring together teams from the three divisions. Honor Division, First Division, and Second Division that expressed and confirmed their willingness to participate.

As of October 6, 1939, only 42 clubs had confirmed their participation in the football competitions for (seniors, juniors, and youth categories). According to the decisions of the league, USM Alger announced its readiness to continue competing at the junior and youth levels on September 22, 1939, and submitted a request to take part in the senior championship in early October. A special committee was also formed within the league to draft exceptional regulations for the organization and supervision of this transitional championship. The participating teams were divided into three groups, whose winners would compete in playoff matches (rencontres de barrage) to determine the Algiers League champion. The draw placed USM Alger in Group A, which consisted of seven teams: RU Alger, AS Saint Eugène, O Tizi Ouzou, O. Rouïba, RS Alger, US Alger and USM Alger.

Based on match coverage and press commentary throughout the season, USM Alger played its home matches at Stade le Bon and wore either purple and black or red and white kits, according to sports journalists of the time writing in various sports pages. The standout players included goalkeeper Abderrahman Ibrir, who was also the keeper for the Algiers city team and later turned professional with Toulouse FC in France. Another key player was the brilliant Mohamed Hamdi, whose name was often chanted by the fans, as well as the excellent Mokrane Karassane. USM Alger entered the Algiers championship with modest experience and faced seasoned and well established teams, ultimately delivering a very modest season performance.

==== 1940–41 season ====
Starting in July 1940, the league initiated a series of meetings and discussions with club representatives to examine issues related to the new season and the preparatory measures to be taken. In this context, USM Alger began its preparations for the competition as early as August. Player licenses were made available for signing at the Belcourt office, specifically at the Alcazar café on rue de l’Union, as well as at the club's official headquarters on rue Devon, at the home of Mr. Meddad. The club also announced the resumption of training starting on August 23. These sessions were held at the Bainem Stadium, in a gym in Belcourt, and at the P.C.M.A. Hall in algiers.

One of the notable developments during this period was the departure of USMA's goalkeeper, Abderrahmane Ibrir, who transferred to AS Saint Eugène. Ibrir would go on to shine with that club, which enjoyed better conditions compared to USM Alger. On September 7, 1940, USMA's management held a general assembly at the Bainem Stadium, attended by nearly all the players and a large number of supporters. During this assembly, several updates were announced, and some organizational shortcomings were addressed, all with the goal of ensuring continuity and maintaining the serious work that had already begun.

After several meetings and consultations, the league decided based on the number of clubs meeting the necessary criteria to modify the structure of the amateur championships in Algeria compared to the previous season, which was known as the War championship. These changes led to the creation of the following competitions: the Critérium de Division d'Honneur, the Critérium de 1re Division, and the Critérium des 2e et 3e Divisions. USM Alger was placed in Group B of the Critérium des 2e et 3e Divisions, alongside the following teams: US Alger, Club Cherchell, CA Paté, SC Algérois, FC Kouba, and USM Alger.

USM Alger recorded strong results that season, finishing in third place in their group, which allowed the club to retain its position in the competition for the following year. The final tally, after 10 matchdays, included five wins and a total of 22 points. As with the previous season, this one was considered experimental. The primary objective was to increase exposure to competition and gain experience in both management and player development. The club at the time included a large number of young players, particularly at the youth level. As for the senior team, the club's leadership especially the football committee focused on evaluating players and giving them more opportunities to showcase their abilities, with the long-term aim of building a strong team that could represent the club's colors with pride in the future.

==== 1941–42 season ====
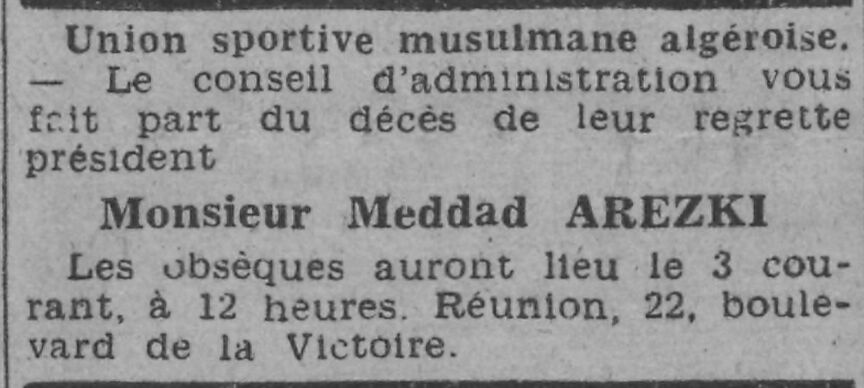
Announcing The death of the club president Arezki Meddad in L'Écho d'Alger newspaper.

The season unfolded under the shadow of a worsening global conflict. World War II was still raging and had grown more intense, especially following the occupation of most of France. Military conscription remained in full force, compounding the challenges faced by football clubs particularly smaller ones with limited resources and capabilities. The management of competitions by the football leagues became increasingly disorganized, leading to widespread doubts, both in official and informal settings, about whether and how the season could be held.

Despite the difficult context, it was confirmed in August that the number of clubs ready to continue competing was largely similar to that of the previous season across various regions. After much deliberation, the league decided to launch the 1941–42 competitions both the championship and the cup on September 1, 1941. The same rules used during the 1938–39 season were reinstated, particularly those governing the organization of playoff matches to determine the champions, as well as the distribution of match revenues and other logistical matters. As part of this reorganization, USM Alger was included in the newly unified second and third division championship, placed in Group C alongside the following eight teams: ASPTT Alger, AS Ain Taya, AS Rovigo, AS Rivet, RC Fondouk, US Alger, USM Maison Carrée and USM Alger.

USM Alger began its preparations for the season early, covering both administrative and technical aspects. The club's management worked on renewing player licenses, registering new recruits, and releasing some of the older players who were no longer part of the team's plans. The squad resumed its physical and technical training at the Bainem stadium, also making use of civil education halls as part of its preseason program. The core lineup for the season did not undergo significant changes compared to the previous year, and it included several well known players such as: Franck Bailek (GK), Ismaïl Mahmoudi, Mustapha Choudar, Mohamed Bouaroub, Ali Slimani, Mohamed Hamdi, Ramon Bergès, Abdelkader Zouani, Mokrane Hadj Rabia, and Mokrane Karassane.

For its home matches, USM Alger played either at the Kouba Stadium or the Bainem Stadium, depending on the schedule and the availability of the venues. Despite having a promising squad, the team's results fell short of expectations. Under the guidance of Mohamed Hamdi, USMA played 14 league matches, but managed to win only three. In the League Cup, the team was eliminated early in the second round, suffering a heavy 5–0 defeat against Stade de Guyotville on October 5, 1941, at the Bainem Stadium. The season was further overshadowed by a tragic event: on April 2, 1942, Arezki Meddad, the club's president, died after contracting typhus, a disease that was spreading widely in the country at the time. His death was a great loss for the club, as he had been USMA's first honorary president, the first treasurer of the inaugural board, and a key member of the executive council. His funeral was held the following day, attended by many members of the community who came to pay their final respects.

==== 1942–43 season ====
The members of the league met on July 23, 1942, to discuss the organization of competitions for the new season. They agreed to publish the calendar during the first half of August. USM Alger began its preparations by renewing player licenses, launching physical and technical training sessions, and playing several friendly matches. The season kicked off with the League Cup matches, which served as qualifiers for the North African Cup. In the first round, USMA defeated US Alger with a score of 2–0. In the second round, the draw pitted them against US Fort de l'Eau, a team from the First Division. USMA once again managed to qualify, winning 1–0 at the Stade de Maison Carrée. However, in the Round of 16, their journey came to an end after a heavy 4–1 defeat to the renowned Gallia Sports d'Alger, considered one of the best clubs in the Division d’Honneur. The match was played on November 1, 1942, at the Stade Communal de Saint Eugène.

The championship for the 1942–43 season had begun at the level of the top divisions but was suddenly interrupted at the end of November 1942 due to the global political and military context, particularly the landing of Allied forces in Algeria. The competition resumed only at the beginning of January 1943, with the publication of an initial schedule, which was quickly modified due to the large number of withdrawals recorded among the clubs. These withdrawals were caused by several difficulties, including a lack of available players and the extreme poverty in which most teams found themselves reflecting the conditions experienced by the broader Algerian population at the time. On January 15, 1943, a new group allocation was published for a championship merging the First and Second Divisions, divided into three groups. USM Alger was placed in Group B, which included the following clubs: CA Paté, AS Douéra, SC Menerville, US Palestro, OM Ruisseau, USM Maison Carrée, and USM Alger.

Shortly before the official start, SC Menerville announced its withdrawal from the competition, reducing the number of teams in the group to six. Despite the challenging context, USM Alger had a generally satisfactory season, considering the numerous difficulties faced not only by the club but also by the other teams in the group. Several clubs forfeited matches or failed to travel, which disrupted the normal course of the championship. Nevertheless, thanks to the commitment of its officials, the solidarity among club members, and the loyal support of its fans, USMA managed to maintain some stability and deliver commendable sporting performances. The club finished the season in an honorable third place in its group, with a total of 29 points from 12 matches.

==== 1943–44 season ====
The League Algiers Association held a meeting on September 1, 1943, to assess the conditions surrounding the launch of the new football season, in a context marked by disorder and instability that had affected the previous season due to the ongoing war. Despite the importance of the meeting, no immediate decision was made, as the situation of the clubs likely to participate in the various competitions remained unclear. As a result, it was decided to postpone any decision regarding the league structure until the teams began their usual annual preparations. In this context, the League announced on September 16 that all affiliated clubs wishing to take part in the competitions were invited to submit their applications. These applications had to specify the stadium where the club would host its matches, as well as the number of teams it intended to field in the various divisions. The deadline for submitting this information was set for September 25, to allow the League to schedule the competitions in accordance with wartime regulations.

In preparation for the new sporting season, USM Alger organized a multi-sport event at the Stade Municipal, with a humanitarian and charitable focus. The event featured several competitions in various disciplines: football, basketball, cycling, and athletics, under the slogan: "Sport in the service of charitable causes" All proceeds from this initiative were donated to the International Committee of the Red Cross and the Islamic Charitable Organization. The event drew a large crowd and was attended by numerous civil and sporting figures. It was widely praised for its excellent organization and the warm, united atmosphere, making it a model for using sport in service of humanitarian causes.

The scheduling for the new season shows that USM Alger hosted its opponents alternately at the Stade Municipal and the Saint-Eugène Stadium, in line with the League's calendar, which took stadium availability into account. USM Alger was placed in the Critérium des équipes inférieures (Lower Teams’ Division) due to the restructuring of the league system during that period. The League set the start of the Championnat Honneur (Honor Division) for November 14, 1943, to be followed immediately by the Critérium, which included USM Alger and other clubs, some of which participated with their reserve teams. These clubs included: USM Alger, USM Maison Carrée, USM Blida, MC Alger, RU Alger, AS Saint Eugène, CA Paté, ASPTT Alger, AS Menerville, RAS Algérois, RS Alger et O Hussein Dey.

For the first time, USM Alger played such a large and intense number of matches in a single year, facing a group of formidable teams. Despite the difficulty of the challenge, the club achieved respectable results, in line with its reputation in the football world. The team featured several well known players, such as the El Kamal brothers (Mostefa, Ahmed, and Youssef), Mohamed Hamdi, Amar Kacib, and Mokrane Karassane who all contributed significantly to this performance. USMA would finish in third place in the overall standings of the lower tier group.

==== 1944–45 season ====
After numerous discussions within the League, and thanks to the goodwill shown by a significant number of clubs wishing to take part in the competition this season a number higher than the previous season it was decided to retain last year's competition format, with a few adjustments: the Critérium d'Alger will be organized for both senior and youth categories, and the Critérium des équipes inférieures will also involve seniors and youth teams, and will be divided into two groups. The qualified teams from each group will face off in playoffs to determine the Algiers Lower Division Champion.

USMA has always worked in the positive spirit of competition, namely: to educate, train, and help young people grow culturally, given the situation that prevailed during that period (World War II).

— Former player Mouloud Lazizi stated in the newspaper OLYMPIC (issue from May 19 to 25, 2000).

USM Alger was placed in Group B, which does not include any reserve teams from first division clubs. All such reserve teams were grouped in Group A. The name of this division has changed over time and is now more commonly referred to as the First Division Championship. Lastly, a cup competition was introduced, open to all teams, called (La Coupe Départementale). USM Alger's group is composed of eight teams, namely: CA Paté, AST Alger, AS Montpensier, ASPTT Alger, RAS Algérois, RC Maison Carré, USM Maison Carré, and USM Alger. USM Alger began the season with a mixed squad, combining some veteran players with new young recruits. Among the most notable additions was Rabah Zouaoui, a centre forward and former player of SC Algérois and MC Alger.

The level reached by USM Alger this season is the result of several factors, chief among them the determination of those in charge of managing this young team, as well as their constant commitment to raising the club's flag high. They succeeded in overcoming the many challenges and harsh conditions surrounding the team and football in general, in a context marked by war, poverty, and the harsh realities of daily life. The engagement of the supporters and fans of the club around this young team also played a crucial role, providing valuable support during the most critical moments, especially when facing experienced opponents with a rich footballing history and a respectable level of management and practice.

=== Post-war career ===
Like many Algerian clubs, USM Alger was heavily affected during World War II. Official football activities were halted, and only informal matches were held under strict French colonial supervision. After the war ended, Algerian Muslim players and club officials, including those at USM Alger, faced significant repression. Many were banned from returning to sporting activities, particularly those suspected of political involvement or support for the nationalist movement. USM Alger was directly impacted by the massacres of May 8, 1945, which left a deep scar on the club. Some of its members were killed or injured during the brutal French crackdown. In remembrance of these tragic events, the club adopted its iconic red and black colors as a lasting symbol of sacrifice and mourning, according to club leaders and contemporaries.

==== 1945–46 season ====
USM Alger began its physical and technical preparations early, while also playing several friendly matches. The club committed to taking part in the league and cup competitions and requested to join the youth and junior championships. Through this, the league identified the number of teams set to participate in the cup and lower-division tournaments. At the start of the season, the experienced player El Kamal Mostefa was nominated to attend a coaching training course organized by the Algiers League under the supervision of the French Amateur Football Federation (FFFA). El Kamal finished fourth in the course with an average score of 52.5, earning a coaching certificate. He was then entrusted with the role of team manager for the Union during the current season and in the following ones, eventually becoming a well-known coach in the sporting community.

Since USM Alger finished as runner-up in the previous season after recording positive results, the club's management decided to approach the current season by keeping the majority of the experienced players while adding a few new recruits. The squad is composed of: goalkeeper Bazile Nival, Rezki Izgouti, Miri Salvador, Abdelkader Chaouane, Mostefa El Kamel, Abdelkader Chico, Mohamed Hachlaf, Mahmoud Ismaïl, Rabah Zouaoui, Abdelkader Boufaras, Ahmed El Kamel, Mohamed Elouardi, Rabah Bedarane, Youssef El Kamel, Allel Ouaguenouni, and Mustapha Ouaguenouni. The team manager is none other than the seasoned player Mostefa El Kamel. The Algiers League announced the system for the distribution of clubs affiliated with the lower-division championship for the current season. It was decided to adopt five geographical groups, namely: West Group, East Group, Littoral Group, Center I Group, and Center II Group. USM Alger belongs to the Center II Group, which brings together the following seven clubs: AST Alger, AS Kouba, US Ain-Taya, CC Alger, RAS Alger, OM Ruisseau, and USM Alger.

The shortage of pitches is painfully felt, a problem that particularly affects the leagues in Algiers and in the major cities. As highlighted by La Dépêche Algérienne, the pitch crisis is widespread, but it is even more pronounced in large urban centers where, as in Algiers, the public authorities have not always given it the attention it deserved. In the ongoing Forconi Cup this season, Union Sportive Musulmane d’Alger entered the competition as early as the second round, where they managed to eliminate GS Orléansville with a 2–1 victory at the Boufarik Stadium. A balanced performance and great enthusiasm enabled the Union to secure their qualification for the next round. In the third round, USM Alger faced Olympique Littoral. The match, played in a highly competitive atmosphere, was decided by a precious goal from Rabah Zouaoui, which earned his team a ticket to the quarter-finals. At this stage, the Union came up against FC Blida and lost 2–0.

However, the match did not end without controversy. A columnist from the colonial press accused the Union of "deliberate brutality" while also mentioning stone throwing allegedly carried out by some Algiers supporters. These allegations led the Algiers League to open an inquiry, sanctioning the capital's club with a fine of 500 francs. At the same time, the League re-examined the case of the protest filed by Olympique Littoral and ordered the match to be replayed at the Saint-Eugène Stadium. The Union confirmed its superiority by winning once again, this time 1–0. But the opponent did not give up and lodged a new complaint. This time, the decision was made in their favor: Olympique Littoral was declared qualified in place of USM Alger, who also received a second fine of 500 francs. Thus ended the Union's journey in this edition of the Cup: an administrative elimination coupled with two financial penalties, for a total of 1,000 francs.

==== 1946–47 season ====
USM Alger concluded its previous season with a board of directors meeting held at the end of June, and opened the new season with a general assembly on June 22, 1946, attended by all active and honorary members. This meeting was dedicated to reviewing the outcomes of the past season and discussing the prospects of the new one, particularly with the announcement of a return to the regular competition format that had been in place before the outbreak of the war. In this context, and with the aim of restoring football competition to its pre war level or even achieving a better standard the League held its first meeting in early August 1946. It was decided that the organization of the 1946–47 season would take into account several factors: the recommendations from the previous season, the final standings of the 1938–1939 championships, the rankings from the 1941–42 season, and the results of the 1945–46 season.

As part of the resumption of football activity following the end of World War II, the League held an important meeting on August 31, 1946, dedicated to organizing the 1946–47 sports season. A series of key decisions were made, including setting the official start of the competitions for September 15, 1946, beginning with the North African Cup qualifiers, and setting the participation fee for these qualifiers at 100 francs. USM Alger began its season by competing in the North African Cup qualifiers, where, as was customary, it faced Olympique Littoral in the first round and successfully advanced. However, the team's journey came to an end in the second round, following a defeat to the AS Saint Eugène.

By analyzing the pattern of home matches during the season, it becomes clear that USM Alger preferred to host its games either at the Kouba Stadium or the El Biar Stadium. However, the League's decision was often the deciding factor in venue selection, due to a shortage of available stadiums across the Algiers League. During the general assembly held in the second half of August, the League decided based on a proposal by the competition management committee and in accordance with earlier recommendations to organize the season under the following structure: Division Honneur, First Division, Second Division (divided into two groups, with USM Alger placed in Group B), and Third Division.

USM Alger's group in the Second Division included eight teams: US Ain-Taya, AS Rivet, ASPTT Alger, US Arabaa, JSI Issers, US Rovigo, SC Algérois, and USM Alger. One of the most notable events of the season was the tea reception organized by USM Alger on April 8, 1947, in honor of former player Mostapha El Kamal, who had returned from France holding an advanced coaching diploma. The event took place in a warm and friendly atmosphere, attended by players, club officials, and several guests a gesture reflecting the club's deep appreciation for its former members.

==== 1947–48 season ====
On August 22, 1947, USM Alger inaugurated the new headquarters and multi-sports hall.

At the end of June 1947, the General Assembly of the Algiers League concluded its work and decided the following: the current competition regulations would remain in force until 1949, when they would be revised for the 1950–1951 season. The two groups of the First Division were also drawn. USM Alger was placed in Group II, which consisted of ten clubs: SCU El Biar, US Blida, O Rouiba, O Tizi Ouzou, AS Trèfle Alger, US Fort de l'Eau, SA Belcourt, US Ain-Taya, AS Rivet, and USM Alger.

On August 22, 1947, USM Alger officially inaugurated its new headquarters and multi-sports hall located at 5, rue de Bône (Algiers). The ceremony was attended by many personalities, as well as club officials and honorary members. The large complex included several physical training rooms equipped with changing rooms and showers, a basketball court, a boxing ring, a gymnastics hall, and areas for medical care. The upper floor housed offices and meeting rooms. L'Écho d'Alger reported the words of club leader Mohamed Zenagui, who declared: "The Union’s projects will not stop here, we will continue along the path we have set, inch’Allah.”

According to club official Abdelkader Omrani, the building had once been a stable for animals, located in a narrow alley leading toward the Soustara neighborhood. The club obtained the property and undertook its transformation. The work was carried out by volunteers, including officials, members, supporters, and sympathizers. The son of former player Hassan Rabah recalled that his father, a bricklayer by trade, took an active part in the construction and renovation, supervising several phases of the project.

Recently, in the presence of many personalities, the friendly Muslim multi sports club, USM Alger, inaugurated its physical culture hall. Located at 5, rue de Bône, this spacious venue includes several rooms with changing rooms and showers where basketball players, boxers, gymnasts, and athletes can train in the best possible conditions. During the event, speeches were made and donations were offered to encourage the leaders of USMA to strive for even greater achievements in the future.

— The daily newspaper L’Égalité wrote about the new headquarters and multi-sport hall.

USM Alger then entered the Coupe départementale, an official competition that brought together clubs from Algiers and its surroundings. Exempt from the first round, USMA made its debut in the second round. On September 7, 1947, at the Hydra Stadium, the "Red and Black" faced SCU El Biar and won 2–1. Two weeks later, on September 28, they traveled to Palestro to take on Bouira AC. In a one-sided match, USMA claimed a convincing 4–0 victory, cheered on by a large crowd that had traveled to support the team.

On October 26, at Guyotville Stadium, USMA continued its fine run by defeating ÉS Zéralda 3–1, securing a place in the next round. Then, on December 7 at Saint-Eugène Stadium, the club met SC Algérois and narrowly won 1–0, thanks to a decisive goal from right winger Abdelkader Djaknoun. Despite protests lodged by the Sporting club after the match, the result was upheld, and USMA qualified for the final qualifying round.

That last encounter would go down in history: on January 4, 1948, at Algiers Stadium, USM Alger faced MC Alger for the very first time in an official match. In front of some 3,500 spectators, the contest went in favor of the "Green and Red," who won 2–0. Even though USMA was eliminated from the competition, this match marked the official birth of the first Algiers Derby between USM Alger and MC Alger a rivalry that would go on to become one of the most iconic in Algerian football.

==== 1948–49 season ====
On July 17, 1948, USM Alger celebrated its annual anniversary, as usual, with a festive evening held in the new municipal hall. A large number of athletes and supporters attended to encourage this young institution. The evening was lively and rich in entertainment, featuring the play "Si Meziane" performed by Madame Hattab, as well as a performance by the rising artist Mahieddine Bachtarzi, who was just beginning to make a name for himself on the cultural scene. A few days later, on July 23, 1948, the League issued a call for clubs to finalize their commitments for the championship and cup competitions. It also announced the composition of the two groups of the first division. USM Alger was placed in Group B, which consisted of ten teams: Stade Guyotville, Olympique Rouiba, Olympique Littoral, SC Algérois , US Blida, ÉS Zéralda, AS Montpensier, ÉS Cherchell et USM Alger.

On August 2, 1948, USM Alger held a general assembly that brought together both former and new players at the club's headquarters, with the aim of preparing for the new season and strengthening team cohesion. A few days later, starting on August 12, physical and technical training resumed, taking place in the new sports hall as well as on various available pitches. For this season, it was decided that USMA would host its opponents during championship matches at the Bab El Oued Stadium, then called La Consolation (formerly known as Stade d’Alger). This decision finally provided the club with a permanent home ground for its official fixtures.

USM Alger began its official competitions with the Forconi Cup, a well established tradition among its supporters. Thanks to its strong performances in the previous season, the club was exempted from the first round and prepared directly to face its first opponent in the second round. The draw paired them with JSM Algérois, in a match held at the Stade de la Consolation. From the very first whistle, USMA displayed great determination, imposing its superiority on the field, and secured a 2–0 victory with goals from Abdelkader Djaknoun, earning qualification for the next round.

In the third round, on October 3, 1948, USMA traveled to Blida to face SC Affreville. The match was tense, with the "Red and Black" taking the lead thanks to a goal from Hassan Chabri. But after only half an hour of play, the atmosphere deteriorated: the protests from the opposing side became uncontrollable. The referee, described by the press as weak and unable to manage the situation, was forced to abandon the match, thus awarding victory to USMA under extraordinary circumstances. The journey, however, ended prematurely. In the fourth round, on October 17, 1948, USM Alger came up against a formidable opponent from the Honor Division: AS Saint Eugène. The Algiers club suffered a heavy 3–0 defeat, which brought its cup run to an end despite a promising start.

USM Alger also experienced a difficult season in a fiercely competitive first division championship. After 18 matches, the club recorded six victories, five defeats, and seven draws, collecting a total of 35 points. Offensively, the team scored 31 goals, while conceding 24. This was considered an average record, but it was enough for USMA to finish in sixth place and secure its place in the first division.

==== 1949–50 season ====
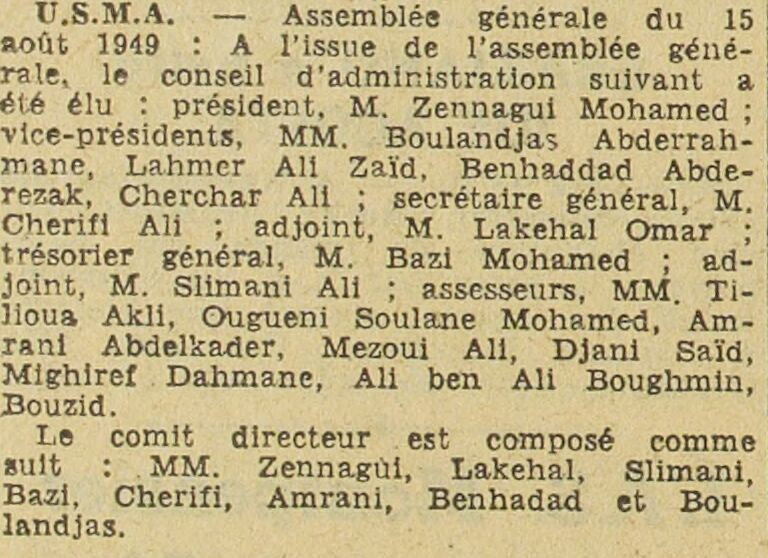
General meeting of USM Alger, August 15, 1949, in L'Écho d'Alger.

Following an average season on several fronts, USM Alger began preparing for its return to first division competition, launching efforts early on both administrative and sporting levels. In this context, the club held its general assembly on July 15, 1949, at the official headquarters, during which the latest developments in organizational and sporting matters were discussed. Following this meeting, the club's officials submitted the registration applications for participation in the First Division Championship and the Algiers League Cup, after the official authorizations were issued on July 14.

Regarding the squad, the club opened the period for signing and renewing player licenses starting on August 1. On August 13, a presentation meeting was held to introduce both new and returning players to coach El Kamal Mostefa. Physical and technical training officially began the following day, August 14, marking the start of preparations for the upcoming season. The management of USM Alger decided to host its official matches this season at the La consoltation Stadium, which would later be renamed Marcel Cerdan Stadium. This decision was part of the club's organizational preparations for the start of the new season.

Meanwhile, the Algiers League released on July 21, 1949, the official list of clubs competing in the First Division, Group A. The group includes ten teams: US Fort-de-l'eau, O. Tizi Ouzou, OM Saint Eugène, AS Kouba, SCU El Biar, JS Birtouta, Olympique Rouiba, AS Rivet, AS Douéra and USM Alger. In a festive and lively atmosphere, USM Alger held its grand annual celebration on the evening of September 15, 1949, at the Majestic cinema hall, drawing a large audience. The event featured a special performance by the renowned Tunisian troupe led by artist Ali Sriti, adding a distinct Maghrebi flair to the occasion. Attendees also enjoyed the popular comedy play Chakchouk, along with a variety of other entertainment segments, making the evening a vibrant cultural celebration just days before the start of the new football season.

==== 1950–51 season ====
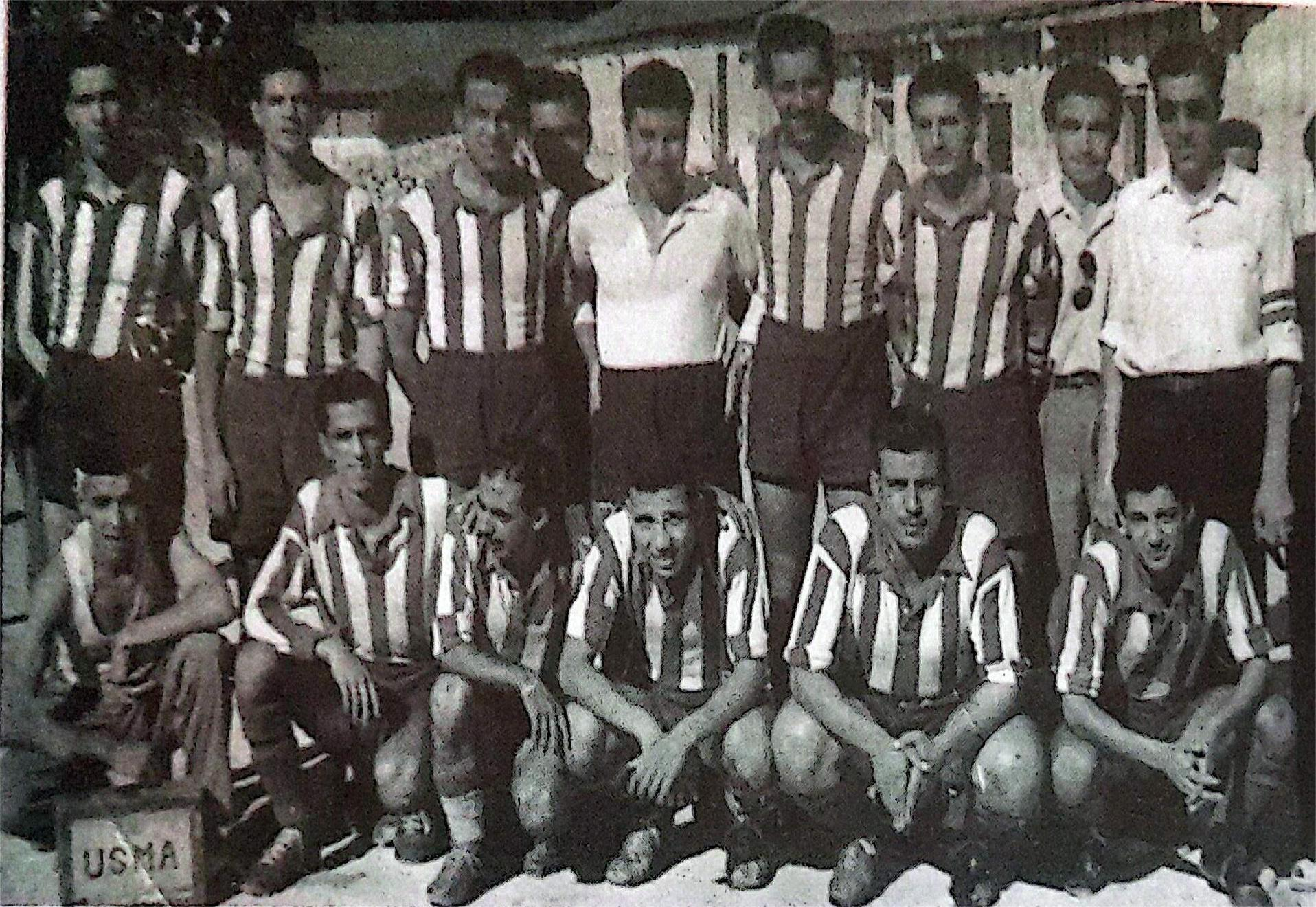
USM Alger 1950–51 with From Right to Left: Stand Up : Hamid Akliouat (coach), a supporter, Kamal Benhaddad, Mustapha Ouaguenouni (C), Zitouni (GK), Allel Ouaguenouni, Bouadjadj, Cherif. Sitting Naït Kaci, Zouaoui, Chabri, Bedaréne, Hamadouche "Bisco", Hamid Rekkal (team nurse).

As part of their preparations for the new season, USM Alger began their activities very early by opening the door to new player signings and renewing the licenses of several veterans as early as July 1950, to preserve the team's experience and stability despite the advanced age of some players. Physical training sessions started in the club's gym located on Bone Street, while technical training sessions were held on various pitches from the beginning of August, with the aim of preparing the players physically and tactically for the upcoming season. On the technical side, the club's former coach, Mr. Mustapha El Kamal, joined OM Saint Eugène and was replaced by Mr. Hamid Akliouat, who was officially presented to players of all categories on October 6, 1950, at the club's headquarters.

At that time, the club's management insisted on close medical monitoring of players at all levels, in accordance with the regulations of the Federation and the Algiers League. For this reason, a large number of players were called up to undergo general and specialized medical examinations at the Stade d’Alger on December 5 and 7, 1950, in application of certain decisions issued by the League about five years earlier regarding changes to the competition system. As a result, the teams qualified to play in the First Division were divided into three groups, and USM Alger was placed in the second group, which included ten clubs: OM Saint Eugène, O. Tizi Ouzou, U.S.A. Fort de l'Eau, SC Alger, O. Rouïba, AS Rivet, JS Kabylie, GS Alger-Hydra, USM Maison Carrée and USM Alger.

The draw for the first round of the "Forconi" League Cup pitted USM Alger against a Second division team, JSI Issers, at the Rouiba Stadium on September 3, 1950. The match was largely dominated by USMA, who qualified with a comfortable 3–0 victory. The first goal was scored by an JSI Issers player against his own side, before Rabah Zouaoui doubled the lead early in the second half. Right-back Dahmane Hamadouchi sealed the win by scoring the third goal in the final minutes, sending his team through to the next round.

In the second round, USM Alger continued their strong form by facing another Second division side, US Ben Aknoun, at Hussein Dey Stadium on September 17. The Red and Black delivered an impressive attacking performance, winning by a large 6–1 scoreline. The goals were scored by Rabah Zouaoui, Rabah Bedaréne, and Ouaguenouni, while Hacène Chabri shone by netting a hat-trick, thus securing a deserved qualification for the third round. However, USMA's run came to an end in the third round after being eliminated by OM Saint Eugène in a match played at the Saint Eugène Stadium on October 8. The encounter was one-sided and dominated from start to finish by the home team, who won 4–1. Zoubir Naït Kaci scored the only goal for the Usmistes to salvage some pride.

USM Alger ended the season on a disappointing note, far from the ambitions expressed at the start of the campaign. Considered a serious contender for the title, the club ultimately failed to live up to expectations. Over the course of 18 matches, the Red and Black recorded 6 wins, 5 draws, and 7 losses, collecting a total of 35 points. The team scored 27 goals and conceded 24. With this mixed record, USMA had to settle for 7th place in their group, merely securing their survival in the First Division instead of competing for the top spots. Despite having favorable conditions, poor preparation at the start of the season heavily affected the team's overall performance. Thus, the teammates of Mustapha and Allel Ouaguenouni once again missed their appointment with glory, despite the predictions that had already seen them as champions.

==== 1951–52 season ====
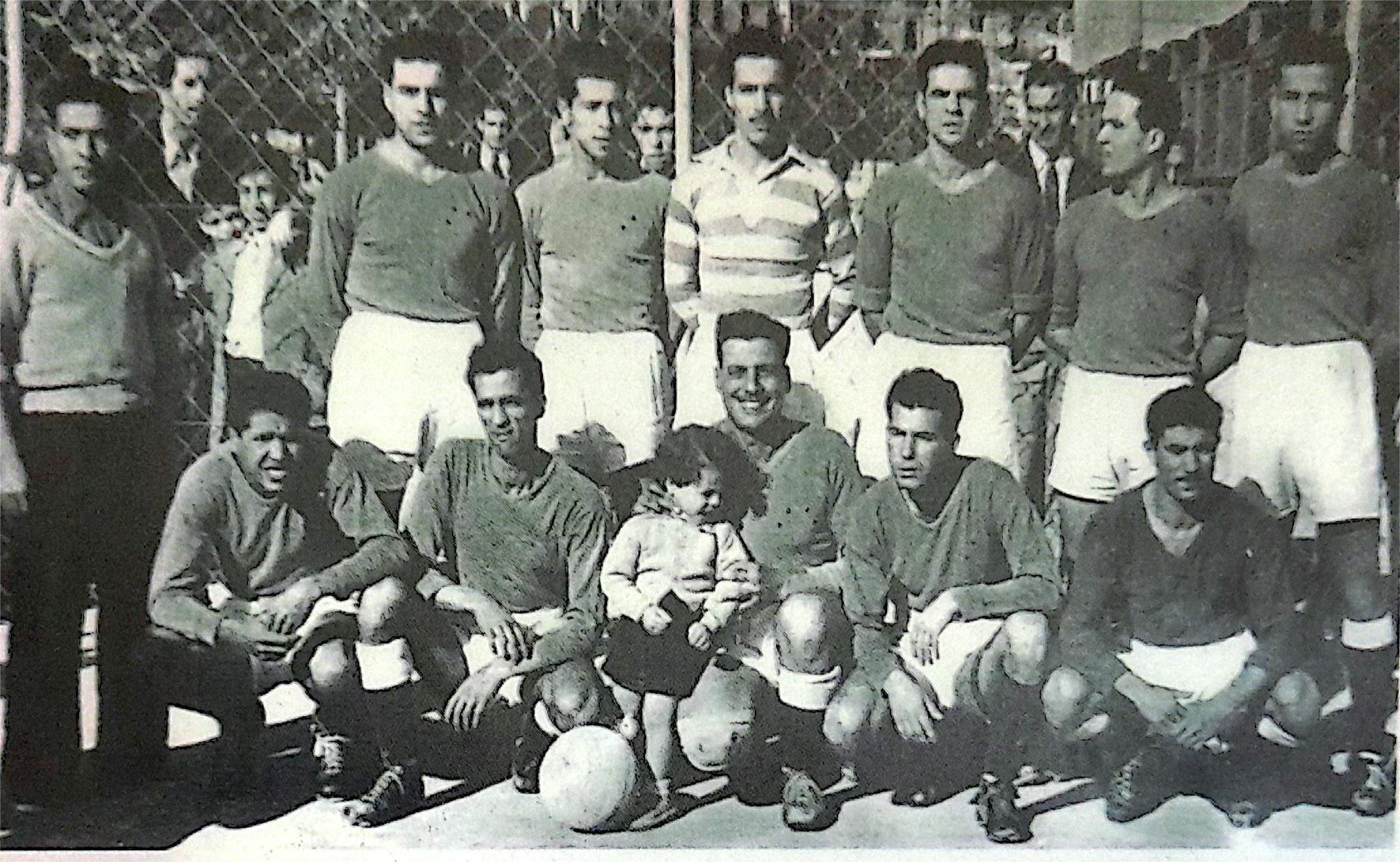
USM Alger 1951–52 with From Right to Left: Stand Up : Hamid Akliouat (coach), Allel Ouaguenouni, Bouhraoua, Benbouha (GK), Bouadjadj, Bedjani, Chabri. Sitting Benhaik, Hamadouche, Zouaoui, Messat, Azzouz.

At the end of the previous sports season, the Union club held its annual general assembly on May 20, 1951. The board of directors met on May 24, in the presence of all members, to evaluate the results of the past season and to take the necessary measures to reorganize the board's office as well as the various committees. Other meetings were also held on the evening of May 31 and on June 23 to discuss various issues related to preparations for the new sports season. On September 6, 1951, the League published the composition of the three groups of the First Division. USM Alger was placed in Group I, which included the following ten teams: RC Maison Carrée, US Ouest Mitidja, O. Tizi Ouzou, O. Rouïba, US Blida, JS El Biar, RC Kouba, NA Hussein Dey, GS Alger-Hydra, USM Alger.

The competition began, as usual, with the Forconi Cup qualifiers for the North African Cup. USM Alger qualified in the first round by eliminating CS Algérois with a 2–0 victory at Stade Marcel Cerdan on September 9, 1951. Boualem Bedjani opened the scoring before Mohamed Messat doubled the lead. However, the Union's run came to an end in the second round after a 2–0 defeat against ES Zéralda on September 23 at the Guyotville Stadium. The Red and Blacks failed to show much despite the efforts of their players especially Krimo Rebih, who stood out but the score remained unchanged until the final whistle.

The Union Sportive Musulmane Algéroise secured first place in Group A, finishing at the top of the table with 49 points from 18 matches, achieving 14 wins, 3 draws, and only 1 defeat. The team's attack scored 51 goals, while the defense conceded only 15, as they awaited the outcome of the promotion play-offs. This was the best record achieved by the Union since its promotion to the First division. The club's board of directors met on April 11, 1952, at the team's headquarters, with all members present, to address the unresolved issues still affecting the team and to prepare as best as possible for the play-off matches.

In the first match, the Union lost to SCU El Biar, champions of the second group, by a score of 3–2 in a match played at the Stade de La Kouba on April 20. The match was played in an atmosphere worthy of a major clash, as the Stade de La Kouba was packed with spectators, to the point that some had to rent or bring their own chairs to sit outside the already overcrowded stands. The Union managed to pull two goals back in the last 20 minutes of the second half through Hacène Chabri and Krimo Rebih, but the team was ultimately defeated.

In the second match, the Union suffered a surprising 3–0 defeat against O. Marengo, in the game played at the Stade de Blida on April 27, which saw complete domination by O. Marengo throughout the match. After the game, altercations broke out between players of both teams, and several players, including Ahmed Azzouz and Boualem Bedjani, were sanctioned, while both clubs were fined 1,000 francs due to some supporters invading the pitch and causing incidents after the match. Thus, the Union wasted a very rare opportunity one that will be difficult to recreate in the future to win promotion to the Division d’Honneur, despite all the favorable conditions, as this season is considered exceptional compared to previous ones.

==== 1952–53 season ====
At the end of the season, USM Alger, in coordination with its main supporters, organized a recreational outing to the Sidi Fredj beach on May 18, 1952, for the benefit of the players and loyal fans of the club, in a friendly and relaxed atmosphere. During the holy month of Ramadan, the club also hosted musical evenings led by the dean of popular Algerian music, Cheikh El Hadj M'Hamed El Anka, a symbolic artist who often sang for USMA on various occasions, thus strengthening the cultural ties between the club and its community. The board of directors met on May 12 and 30 in preparation for the extraordinary general assembly, which was held on June 20 under the presidency of Mohamed Zenagui, with the presence of active, honorary, and beneficiary members, at the club's headquarters. Finally, the founding general assembly took place on July 6 and 12 and concluded on the same day with the first meeting of the new board of directors, marking the beginning of a new chapter in the club's organization.

A new meeting of the USM Alger board of directors was held on July 30, 1952, marking an important step in preparations for the new season. On this occasion, both former and new players were introduced to the coach, who immediately began physical and technical training sessions starting from the first week of August 1952. Meanwhile, the Algiers Football League held a general assembly on June 28 to address various issues facing football in Algiers and its surroundings. The meeting brought together presidents from most clubs, particularly those playing in the Division d’Honneur, who submitted their proposals and demands to the League. Among these were: The creation of an intermediate division between the Division d’Honneur and the First Division (called "Pré honneur") A revision of the playoff system. However, no concrete decisions were made on the matter.

On July 4, 1952, the League published the composition of the First Division groups for the upcoming season. USM Alger was placed in Group 3, which included a total of ten teams: GS Alger, ES Zéralda, OCB Oued-Fodda, ASPTT Alger, OM Saint Eugène, AS Kouba, WA Boufarik, NA Hussein Dey, Olympique de Médéa and USM Alger. The competition began, as usual, with the qualifying rounds of the League Cup the Edmond Forconi Cup which served as a qualifier for the North African Cup. USM Alger advanced from the first round without playing, due to a forfeit by Olympique Pointe-Pescade. In the second round, USMA faced AS Montpensier-Berre and secured a comfortable 6–2 victory in an easy match held on September 21 at the Kouba Stadium, despite strong winds during the first half. The Algiers based club continued its run by qualifying for the third round with a narrow 1–0 win over JSM Algérois, in a match played at the Marcel Cerdan Stadium on October 12, in front of a large crowd. This hard fought victory came in a difficult encounter against strong opposition.

USMA's journey came to an end in the fourth round, following a defeat against Olympique Hussein Dey, one of the leading clubs in the Honor Division and champions of Algeria for the regular season. The match took place on November 2 at the Municipal Stadium and ended in a 2–0 victory for O. Hussein Dey, secured during extra time after a goalless draw in regulation. USMA had a poor season, with modest results that nearly led the club to a dangerous outcome. It is difficult to pinpoint the reasons that prevented the team from competing at the top, despite having quality players and being reinforced by several young talents. These efforts were only enough to ensure survival in the First Division. USMA finished the championship in seventh place, with a total of 34 points, recording four wins, eight draws, and six losses in 18 matches.

==== 1953–54 season ====
The Algiers Football League announced the composition of the First Division groups for the new season very early, and this composition underwent several changes. Group 3, to which USM Alger belongs, included ten teams: OCB Oued-Fodda, Olympique Littoral, SC Algérois, US Blida, JS El Biar, RC Kouba, GS Alger Hydra, USM Marengo, OM Ruisseau et USM Alger. As part of the season's preparations, USM Alger held an elective general assembly on June 10, 1953, at the club headquarters, attended by members, players, and new candidates. This meeting resulted in the election of a new board of directors, which held its first meeting the following day (June 9) to finalize organizational matters.

Azef (GK), Bellout (GK), Allel Ouaguenouni, Mustapha Ouaguenouni, Bouadjadj, Zouaoui, Naït Kaci, Chibane, Saâdi, Mekkiri, Rabah Hassan, Belkraoui, Tchikou, Ramadan Achir, Tadjouni, Bedarane, Kassar, Bouazzaz, Hamel, Rekkal, Samghouni, Zoubir Bengnife, Ahmed Kherouni, Hamdouchi, Bouchakour, Ben Arrafa, Hamid Ben Ali, Seghane, Babassi, Ben Salem, Belarbi, Kouirat, Atti, Ammari, Challali, Maamani, Ouair, Fourmak.

— Squad of 1953–54 USM Alger season.

The board subsequently held several follow up meetings, the most significant being on June 19, during which it was decided to open license renewals for returning players and to begin signing licenses for new players starting, July 2, 1953. On July 8, the board met again with both returning and new players in preparation for their presentation to the coach on August 9, after undergoing a preliminary medical check-up on August 6, with special focus on the new signings. Physical training sessions began on August 12, 1953, at the club's physical education hall and on the Stade Marcel Cerdan, as part of a comprehensive training program to prepare for the start of the championship.

As usual, USM Alger began its season with the Forconi Cup qualifiers, a highly followed competition at the time. The club was exempt from the first round and started directly in the second round, where it crushed Djendel CA 7–0 on the Médéa pitch on September 13, 1953. In the third round, played on September 20, USMA faced Olympique Littoral. In a thrilling match, the Red and Black put on a brilliant and spectacular performance, winning 3–2 and thus securing their place in the next round. The run ended in the fourth round after a 2–1 defeat to JS Isserville at the Stade de Fondouk on October 11. The match was played in front of a large crowd of USMA fans who had traveled en masse to support their team away from home, but in vain.

While all hopes were pinned on a possible promotion to the newly created Division of Access to the Honneur, USM Alger nearly suffered relegation to the Second Division. Ultimately, Rabah Zouaoui's teammates narrowly managed to retain their place in the First Division, which would be downgraded to the third level in the hierarchy starting the following season, with the introduction of a new league pyramid. This championship is widely considered the worst in the club's history since its founding in 1937. The team's journey was marred by instability, tactical disarray, and a chronic inability to settle on a consistent starting eleven throughout the season. USMA lacked consistency and efficiency, showing an unrecognizable and disappointing face to both supporters and officials.

=== Liberation revolution ===
When the Algerian War of Liberation broke out on November 1, 1954, sports competitions especially football were not immune to the events unfolding in the country. As the football season got underway in the early months of the revolution, Algerian youth, including athletes and football players, responded to the call of the revolution and joined its ranks. These young men were active in various competitions at the time, all of which were under the control of the French colonial system. Players and officials from USM Alger (Union Sportive Musulmane d'Alger) were no exception. Like many Algerians across different walks of life, they embraced the national cause and joined the revolutionary struggle some immediately after the revolution began, others later as it progressed, and particularly following the club's withdrawal from the Second Division championship in response to the revolution's growing momentum.

Among the most notable figures were: Ali Zaid, known as Lahmar, one of the founders and key officials of USM Alger, who joined the revolution and later died as a martyr in the line of duty. Saadi Yacef, a nationally renowned freedom fighter and a key leader of the Zone autonome d'Alger (ZAA), who was also connected to the club and Mustapha Ouaguenouni, who followed the same path of resistance and fell as a martyr on the battlefield. The decision of USM Alger to withdraw from the colonial football league was a clear act of defiance, and a powerful symbol of solidarity with the liberation movement. It demonstrated how deeply intertwined sports and the national struggle had become, and how athletes refused to be instruments of the colonial regime.

==== 1954–55 season ====
After the end of the 1953–54 season with very modest, if not outright poor, results, USM Alger failed to secure promotion to the newly established Honor Promotion Division at the level of the Algiers League. As a result, the club remained in the First Division for another season. In this context, the club's board of directors held a regular meeting on June 10, 1954, at the team's headquarters, attended by all members. Several key issues were discussed, including: Releasing a number of players from various levels. Recruiting new players to strengthen the squad and implementing decisions previously made by the league at the start of the past season. Discussing the conditions for continuing competition in the upcoming season, in light of the escalating political tensions in the country with the Algerian Revolution looming on the horizon.

USM Alger began registering both returning and new players starting in early August 1954. The club's committee met with the players and introduced them to the coach on August 14. The team resumed physical and technical training sessions starting on August 27. In accordance with the regulations in force at the time which required clubs to sponsor and develop a number of referees USM Alger followed this directive and developed a group of skilled referees, several of whom later played a prominent role after Algeria's independence. The board of directors convened again on September 7, 1954, to finalize preparations before the start of the competition, in accordance with decisions made before the start of the previous season, particularly those related to the reorganization of competitions and the integration of the new Honor Promotion Division. The Algiers League issued a new structure for the First Division, which included Group III, consisting of 10 teams: SC Alger, Olympique de Rouiba, US Oumale, WA Revet, US Fort-de-l’Eau, ASM Barre, AST Alger, USM Maison Carrée, RC Kouba and USM Alger.

The season ended with USM Alger relegated to the second division, after a very poor campaign due to the ongoing revolution, the beginning of a mass exodus of the club's best players, and other reasons known only to the club's management. A review of the team's season shows that it occupied last place almost throughout the year. They lost several matches at home and drew many others. Away from home, the results were very poor despite a generally acceptable level of play. It is also noticeable that the team used a heavily rotated squad throughout the season, changing lineups from one match to the next. The club management failed to establish a consistent starting eleven by the end of the season. The team also suffered from a weak defensive line and poor coordination between its different departments.

==== 1955–56 season ====
It is well known that many clubs from Algiers, particularly those in the lower divisions, are facing extremely serious difficulties. Currently, USMA is going through a very grave crisis and is on the verge of withdrawing entirely from the upcoming season.
USMA has not yet submitted its registration to the Football League for the 1955–1956 season, despite the deadline having already passed. There is concern that the registration of the Muslim club from Algiers may not be accepted, even if their officials eventually decide to send it.

— Commentary from Le Journal d'Alger on the situation of USM Alger.

As part of its preparations for the 1955–56 season, USM Alger held several important meetings, including a general assembly on July 10, 1955, followed by a meeting of the new board of directors, chaired by Ali Chérifi, on August 15. However, despite these steps, the club faced a deep internal crisis that threatened its very existence. This instability was reflected in delays in carrying out essential administrative procedures most notably, the failure to submit the club information sheet to the Algiers League, which was already flagged on July 9, 1955. In response to this inaction, the League took a firm stance. The press reported the League's warnings: La Dépêche announced that USMA was considered "inactive" and risked automatic relegation. L'Écho d'Alger also published a warning from the disciplinary committee, stating that the club risked being excluded if its situation was not resolved quickly.

In September 1955, after internal discussions among its board members, USM Alger confirmed its continued participation in the 1955–56 Second Division Championship. This decision followed a hearing with the league, during which club president Chérifi assured the team's full commitment to completing the season. The league accepted the club's position, stating that only one match had been delayed. Subsequently, players were called to renew their licenses, and individual negotiations were initiated with key players like Ghanem, Kouiret, Chouchane, and Kouroufi Ahmed regarding their future at the club.

The departure of USM Alger's veteran and experienced players those who had defended the club's colors in previous seasons was due to several reasons. Chief among them were: the decision to retire from football entirely, joining the Algerian revolution in response to the call of national duty, or transferring to another team. The league released the program for the Second Division, divided into four groups. USM Alger was placed in Group III, which included the following teams: US Hospitaliers Alger, AS Rivet, AS Douéra, CC Alger, SCM Blida, JS Birtouta, JU Algéroise, FC Sidi Moussa, RAS Algéroise.

Amid the growing revolutionary movement in Algeria, Muslim sports clubs began withdrawing from official French organized competitions in response to the call of the National Liberation Front (FLN). The FLN urged all Algerian athletes and clubs to cease participation as a rejection of colonial control and in support of the national cause. On March 19, 1956, Le Journal d’Alger reported: "The competition lineup was diminished by the withdrawal of USM Alger and CC Alger, who declared they were abandoning the tournament." This decision became official starting from the match scheduled on March 25, 1956, at Stade Marcel Cerdan, where USM Alger was set to face JS Birtouta. The club's absence made clear that USM Alger had withdrawn from the competition, alongside several other nationalist leaning Muslim clubs, in obedience to the FLN's directive. Despite not completing the season, USMA was ranked 8th in the final standings evidence of the club's competitive level before its withdrawal.

=== Official and Honorary presidents, Managers, and Cultural Influence ===
Presidents of USM Alger during the colonial period
#	Name	Years
1	(France) Ali Zaid	1937–1938
2	(France) Arezki Meddad	1938–1942
3	(France) Abderrahmene Boulandjas	1942–1943
4	(France) Mohamed Aïchoun	1943–1946
5	(France) Mohamed Zenagui	1946–1948
6	(France) Mohamed Bensiam	1948–1950
7	(France) Mohamed Zenagui	1950–1953
8	(France) Ali Chérifi	1953–1956

Since its official founding in 1937, USM Alger was led by a succession of presidents and executive members who oversaw the club through its formative years under French colonial rule and during the challenging period of the Second World War. The first executive committee was established shortly after the club's legal recognition, based on testimonies from early members and the official document submitted to the Governor of the Algiers Department. This founding committee was composed as follows: President: Ali Zaid, Vice presidents: Bennaceur Lakhdar, Fernane Taieb, General Secretary: Halit Ali, Assistant General Secretary: Ahmed Kemmat, Treasurer: Arezki Meddad. This initial leadership laid the organizational groundwork for the club and managed its early activities during a period of growing political and social tensions in Algeria.

The first president of USM Alger, Ali Zaid, officially assumed his role on July 5, 1937, and remained in office until October 1938. He was succeeded by Arezki Meddad, who took over the presidency in October 1938. Meddad presided over the club during the difficult early years of the Second World War and remained in office until his death while still serving as president in April 1942. Following Meddad's passing, Abderrahmane Boulendjas was elected on October 15, 1942. His term lasted for one year, ending on October 17, 1943, and he was succeeded by Mohamed Aïchoun, who served from October 17, 1943, until October 30, 1946. Aïchoun led the club during the immediate post-war years, a time of renewed activity and reorganization.

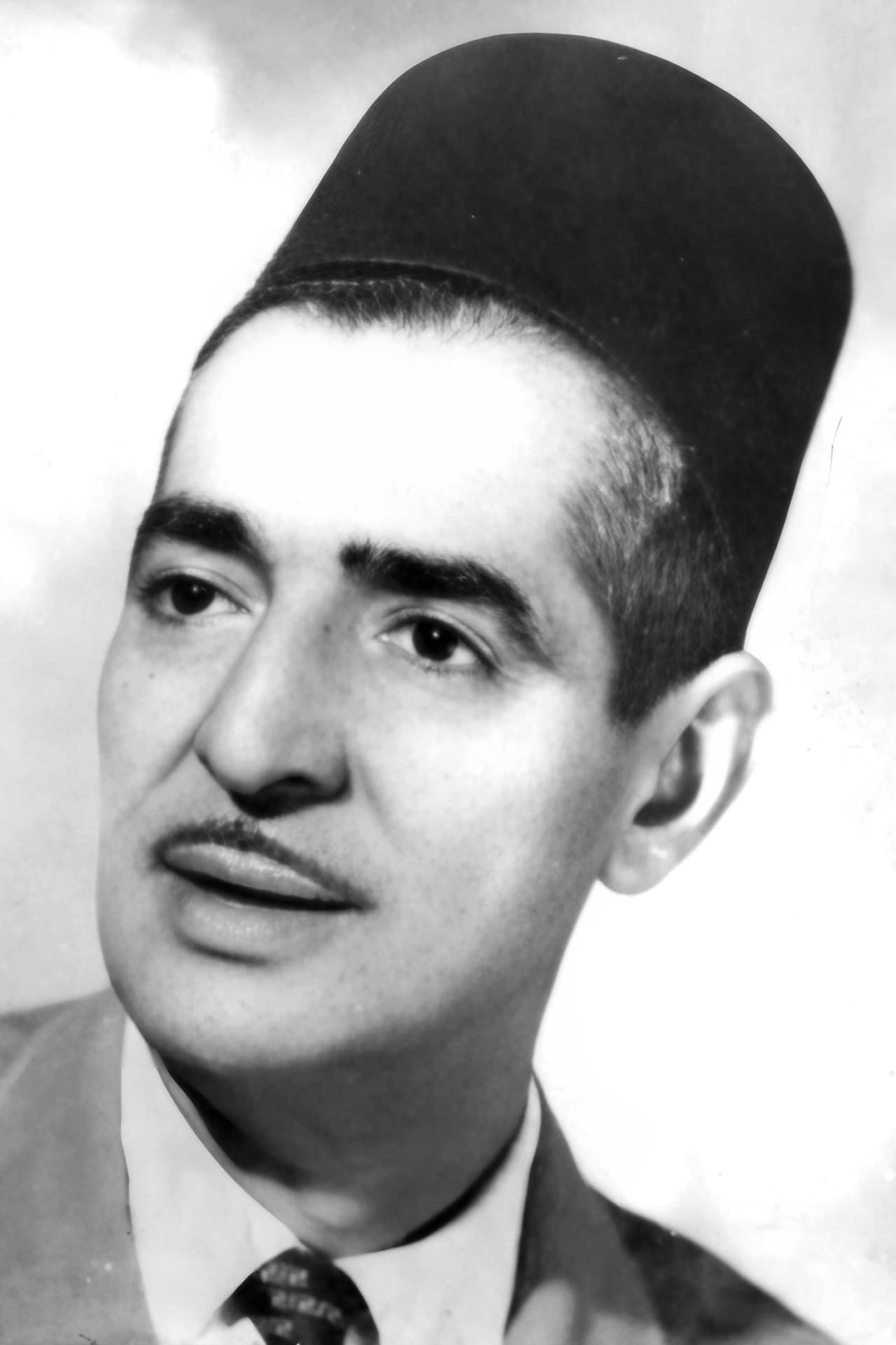
Musician El Hadj M'Hamed El Anka was one of the biggest fans of the club.

On October 30, 1946, Mohamed Zenagui was elected president for the first time, a term that lasted until September 1948. He was succeeded by Mohamed Bensiam, who held the presidency from September 1948 to 1950. Zenagui returned for a second term in 1950, which lasted until June 10, 1953, when Ali Chérifi assumed the role. Chérifi's presidency extended into the mid-1950s, though the precise end date of his mandate is not definitively recorded.

Since its founding, USM Alger has maintained a close bond with many Algerian artists and musicians who supported the club both morally and financially. Prominent figures such as El Hadj M'Hamed El Anka and El Hadj Mahfoud were known for their devotion to the club, often performing at events organized by USMA supporters in the 1930s and 1940s. In 1937, a celebratory concert marking the club's founding featured performances by several artists, including a young El Anka. During a financial crisis in the club's early years, artists like Farid Oujdi held benefit concerts to help sustain the team. El Anka also composed the famous song "L’Union L’USMA" in the early 1940s, considered the first Algerian patriotic sports song.

It celebrated the club's victories and praised its athletes, further cementing the cultural ties between USMA and the Algerian artistic community. This song is considered the first national artistic work to address the subject of sports in Algeria. It holds a special place in the country's cultural history due to its pioneering nature and widespread recognition. The song was released before the one performed by Hadj M'rizek about Mouloudia d’Alger, making it the earliest known national sports themed song in Algeria.

The first verse of the famous song "L'Union L'USMA"

                                                 لُيُونُيُونَ لُويَاسْمَا
                                          يَارَبِّي سَهَلِّي نَنْشَدْ    ………    يَا نِعْمَ الْقَيُّومُ
                                           نَفْخَرْ بَلْسَانِي وَانْجَدَّدْ    ………    حَرْبُ التَّقَدُّمُ   
                                         شَايَن لسبور بتعناد    ………    خُصُوصُ للْهَمَّة
                                           عَلَىالْفَحْشِ وَالْخَمْرُ تُبَاعَدْ    ………    بُشْرَى للأُمَّة
                                           رَانِي فَارَحْ بُشَبَانُ الْيُومُ    ………    يَفْجِيوُ الْغُمَّة
                                         مُوجُودِينْ يَضْوِيوْ كَنْجُومْ    ………    في ليلت ظلمة 
                                         اتَّقَدِّمُو وَاجَبْي نَشْكُرْهُمْ   ………    لِّيُونُيُونِ لُويَاسْمَا

                                           حَدَّادُ او زايد أَو مَدَّادُ   ………   رَايَسُ الْقُومَانُ
                                           الْهَاشْمِي لَحَرِيزِي مَعَ كَمَّاتُ   ………   العَبْدَ الرَّحْمَانُ
                                            بُودِيرْ أَوْ بَأَسْطَةً مَعَ بَخْتِي   ………   لَعْدُوهُمْ نَقْمَة
                                          الْعَاقَلْ بَاسَمْهُمْ يَرْتِي   ………   فُخُرْ بُلا حَشْمَة
                                              رَانِي فَارَحْ لُيُونُيُونَ لُويَاسْمَا

                                                L’Union L’USMA
                   O Lord, make it easy for me to sing ……… O Perfect and Eternal One
            I take pride in my speech and renew myself ……… it is the war of progress
                     We play sports with determination ……… especially with great spirit
                        Far from vice and from alcohol ……… good news for the nation
                         I am happy with today's youth ……… they dispel the sorrow
                  They are present, shining like stars ……… in the dark night
              They move forward, and I must thank them ……… L’Union, L’USMA

                             Haddad or Zayed or Meddad ……… Rais of the brave
                       El Hachemi Lahreizi with Kammat ……… Abdelrahman
                          Boudir and Basta with Bakhti ……… their foes face vengeance
                       The wise one praises their name ……… pride without shame
                                          I am joyful L’Union, L’USMA

The name of USM Alger is closely associated with one of Algeria's greatest chaâbi artists, El Hachemi Guerouabi, who was a passionate supporter of the club since the colonial period. His loyalty to the team remained strong after independence, and he was later named an honorary member of the club in recognition of his unwavering support. Guerouabi paid tribute to USM Alger in several performances, with one of his most iconic songs becoming a cultural anthem among the team's supporters. The lyrics of the opening verse go:

                                   لياسما هوما لبطال           ………          حومت غزلان وفوتبال
                                       كحل واحمر يشرح البال           ………          يوالم كي يلبسوه

                       The USM Alger's is the champion     ………       A neighborhood of gazelles and football
                   Black and red that lifts the spirit     ………       It suits them when they wear it  

These lyrics reflect Guerouabi’s deep affection for the club and illustrate the powerful bond between Algerian music and football. His voice became part of the collective memory of USM Alger fans, blending art and sport into a shared cultural legacy.

In its early years, USM Alger relied on modest sources of funding, primarily donations and assistance from local merchants, well off individuals, and sympathizers of the club. Some shop owners even allocated parts of their establishments for the club's use when needed such as Ben Kanoun Café, Ouaguenouni Café, and others which served as informal support hubs. Despite these efforts, the club faced significant financial burdens, including a particularly high cost of 5,000 francs to rent the stadium a considerable amount at the time. Given the club's financial difficulties, several supporters stepped in to help, most notably the renowned artist El Hadj M'Hamed El Anka, who donated the proceeds from several concerts he performed, either to celebrate the founding of the team or to provide financial support.

=== Club headquarters ===
During the first decade of its existence, USM Alger had several headquarters in Algiers, reflecting the club's changing administrative and social environment, the club's first headquarters was established in 1937, shortly after its foundation. It was located at 21 rue de Bruxelles, in the lower part of the Casbah, in premises associated with a café known as Café (Bar) des Sports. The address was subsequently used by the club during its earliest period. In 1938, USM Alger moved its headquarters to Café Olympique, located at 17 rue de la Marine in Algiers. In 1939, the club moved again, this time to Café Meddad, at 8 rue de Divan.

The premises also served as a place for some of the club's meetings. The source records the address as one of the club's principal headquarters during this period. In 1942, the club's headquarters was transferred to 3 bis rue Randon, in the lower Casbah, where the premises were identified with the former Café Moderne. Four years later, in 1946, USM Alger moved to 7 rue Bône. In 1947, a sports complex was inaugurated at the club's premises on rue Bône. It included the club's headquarters, administrative offices and a meeting room. The address was subsequently given as 7 rue Bône, near the intersection with rue Djebali Mokhtar, in the Soustara area.

=== Home grounds ===
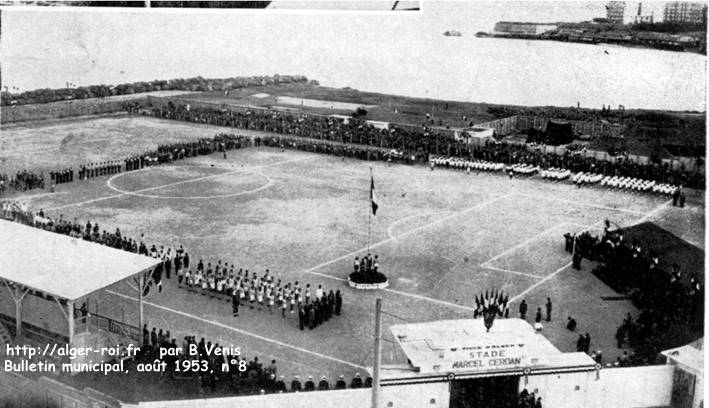
Stade marcel cerdan USM Alger played some of its matches during the colonial period.

During its first years, USM Alger did not have a permanent home ground and played its matches at several stadiums in and around Algiers. During the 1937–38 season, the club hosted its opponents at the Stade du 5e RT in Belfort and the Stade de l'O.P.P. in Baïnem. In 1938–39, it continued to use the Stade de l'O.P.P. in Baïnem. During the 1939–40 season, USM Alger again played its home matches at the Stade de l'O.P.P. in Baïnem. In 1940–41, the club used the Stade Lebon, while some matches were also played at the Stade Saint-Eugène, depending on the fixture schedule. During 1941–42, its home fixtures were divided between the Stade de Baïnem and the Stade Saint-Eugène.

For the 1942–43 season, the club's home ground was initially unclear because the league programme had not yet determined the stadium at which USM Alger would receive its opponents. Following the publication of the schedule, the club's home fixtures were allocated accordingly. In 1943–44, USM Alger played at the Stade Municipal and the Stade Saint-Eugène, while during 1944–45 it used the Stade de Hydra. During the 1945–46 season, USM Alger did not rely on a single home ground, with its matches being scheduled at different stadiums. In 1946–47, the club continued to face difficulties in securing a permanent venue and played most of its home matches at the Stade de Kouba and the Stade d'El Biar.

In 1947–48, USM Alger played its home matches at the Stade de Kouba and the Stade de Maison Carrée. During the 1948–49 season, the club moved to the Stade de la Consolation in Belcourt (B.E.O.). The following season, 1949–50, the same venue was identified as the Stade Marcel Cerdan, and USM Alger continued to receive its opponents there. From the 1950–51 season until 1955–56, the Stade Marcel Cerdan became the principal venue used by USM Alger for its home matches. The club also held training sessions at a ground in the Belcourt district, in the vicinity of the Stade Marcel Cerdan. This succession of grounds illustrates the absence of a fixed home stadium for USM Alger during the colonial period and the club's reliance on several municipal and district stadiums in Algiers.

=== USM Alger and National Liberation War ===
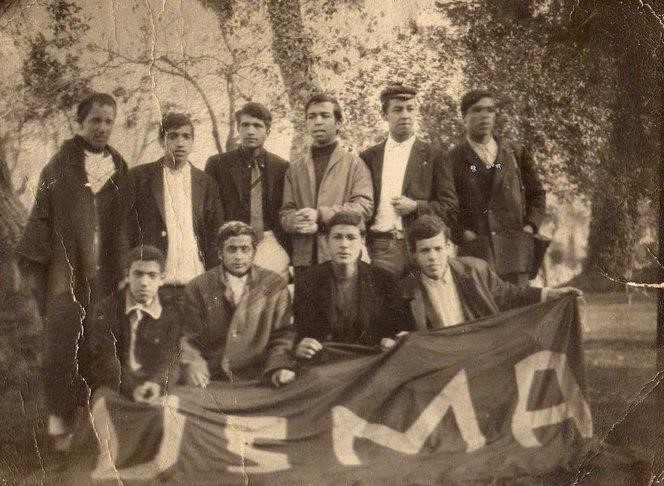
A picture of some USM Alger players in the mountain during the Algerian revolution.

USMA is also a school of Nationalism, says Mr. Kemmat. At the beginning of 1955, the revolution was in full swing, and Mr. Ali Chérifi, who was the club president at the time, having heard of foolish behavior committed by some young players, summoned the minimes, cadets, and juniors to give them a moral lesson. He said to them:

My children, I don't have the right to call you thugs, even if you’re behaving like them, because I know you're from good families, and I know your parents. Listen carefully to what I’m about to say: our country is at war, and we need men to fight French colonialism and drive it out. If tomorrow the leaders of the FLN or the ALN contact us asking for men to join the maquis, do you know what I’d have to tell them? That I only have children here who know nothing but how to fool around. I’ve made a serious decision if you don't change your behavior, you will no longer play football.

In 1956, the central leadership of the National Liberation Front (FLN) made the strategic decision to suspend all sporting activities of Muslim clubs as part of the national resistance effort. A pivotal meeting was held at the USM Alger circle, located on Rue de Bône, to discuss and decide on the cessation of football. This meeting was chaired by Ali Cherifi, then vice president of USMA and financial officer of the Zone autonome d'Alger (ZAA). Two of the early leaders of the ZAA were active members of USMA, further illustrating the club's close ties to the liberation movement. Among them was Mohamed Hattab, better known by his nom de guerre Habib Reda, a key figure in the ZAA's bomb network. Hattab, who was later sentenced to death by the colonial authorities, was also a basketball player with USM Alger.

A group of mujahideen during the Algerian War of Liberation, including players from USM Alger, from right to left: Colonel Saadi Yacef, Ahmed Lazali, Abdelkader Sas, and Rabah Hassan.

Following the closure of the Casbah by French forces sealed off with barbed wire and restricted checkpoints the USMA circle at 7 Rue de Bône became a known refuge for Fedayeen fighters. In response, the colonial administration targeted the location, it was first occupied by Zouave troops in November 1956, and later by paratroopers, who converted it into a torture center. As a result, all administrative and technical archives of USM Alger were seized by the occupying army, marking a tragic loss in the club's historical record and further evidence of the club's entwinement with the struggle for Algerian independence.

Despite the extraordinary circumstances of the Algerian War, the football league authorities ultimately decided to include USM Alger in the final standings of the 1955–56 season, in order not to penalize the club. Under normal regulations, a general forfeit (withdrawal from competition) would result in automatic relegation. However, the league made an exception, anticipating a possible resumption of activity in the following season. This withdrawal came at the explicit request of the National Liberation Front (FLN), as a symbolic gesture of support for the Algerian revolution against French colonialism, and to draw international attention to the cause. Following the club's withdrawal, several players joined the FLN in the mountains to take part in the armed struggle.

In reaction to the refusal of MC Alger to follow suit and suspend its sporting activities, officials from the Zone autonome d'Alger (ZAA) tasked two fidayins, both USMA players, with disrupting a match between AS Saint Eugène and MC Alger at the Saint Eugène stadium. Their mission was to create disorder and pressure MCA into ceasing participation. These two men were Abdelkader Boudissa, known as "Chichois", who later fell in battle in Wilaya IV and Rachid Ferhaoui, known as "Rachid Red", who was sentenced to death in 1957.

Their actions and sacrifice were part of a broader pattern: USM Alger would go on to contribute the highest number of martyrs (Chouhada) among all Algerian football clubs. The tally reached 46 martyrs, including captain Allel Oukid, head of the 4th region of Wilaya IV and Mohamed Arezki Bennacer, head of the 3rd region of the ZAA and leader of the bomb network. This legacy solidified USM Alger's historical identity as not only a football club, but also a deeply committed national symbol of resistance and sacrifice during Algeria's fight for independence.

List of USM Alger martyrs.
1 Noureddine Benkanoune	2 Abdelkader Belkraoui	3 Taher Abbas	4 Mohamed Halami	5 Abderezak Salama says Pons
6 Ali Zaid says Lahmar	7 Moussa Chrih	8 Mohamed Hamitouche	9 Mustapha Djouab	10 Athmane Doudah
11 Boualem Mekkiri	12 Kamel Belhaddad	13 Mahmoud Louchal	14 Mohamed Djaknoune	15 Ahmed Djaknoune
16 Hamada Hachlaf	17 Abderahmane Boussoura	18 Omar Lalal	19 Omar Sahnoune	20 Abdelkader Boudissa
21 Mustapha Ouaguenouni	22 Moh Arezki Bennacer	23 Mustapha Oukid	24 Mustapha Moudhab	25 Mustapha Lounes says Hafiz
26 Abderrahmane Arbadji	27 Oukid Allal	28 Kheireddine Zenouda	29 Mohamed Rekabi	30 Mohamed Taled
31 Achour Maidi	32 Mohamed Benghenif	33 Rabah Timsit	34 Boualem Merdab	35 Ali Toumiat
36 Djelloul Doussas	37 Abderahmane Taleb	38 Amar Taleb	39 Mohamed Boulenjas	40 Mohamed Tazairte
41 Mohamed Basta	42 Hocine Asla	43 Taib Zermi	44 Mohamed Souak	45 Abdelmadjid Boutalbi
46 Idriss Benhabyles				
