= The Journey of the Union Sportive Muslmane Algérois, Part One =

2014 history book

The Journey of the Union Sportive Muslmane Algérois, Part One 1937 – 1956
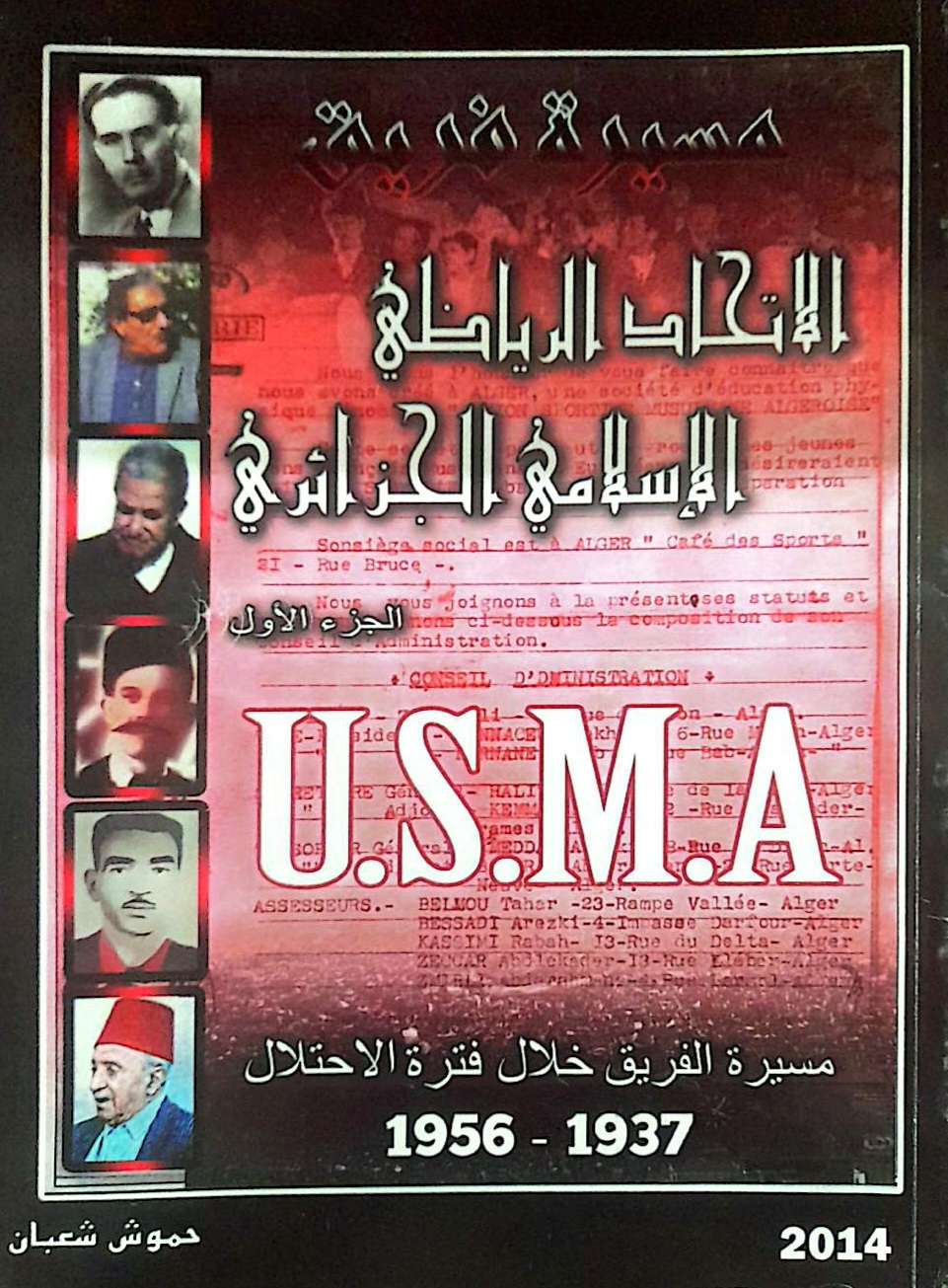
- Author: Hammouche Chaâbane
- Original title: مسيرة فريق الإتحاد الرياضي الاسلامي الجزائري الجزء الاول 1937 – 1956
- Language: Arabic
- Series: 1
- Genre: Biography
- Publisher: دار كرم الله للنشر والتوزيع
- Publication date: 2014
- Publication place: Algeria
- Pages: 282
- ISBN: 978-9931-554-02-8

The Journey of the Union Sportive Muslmane Algérois, Part One 1937 – 1956 (Arabic: مسيرة فريق الإتحاد الرياضي الاسلامي الجزائري الجزء الاول 1937 – 1956) is a 2014 book by Hammouche Chaâbane which explores the history of USM Alger (Union Sportive Musulmane Algéroise) during the French colonial period.

== What Is This Book About? ==
This book explores the history of USM Alger (Union Sportive Musulmane Algéroise) during the French colonial period, from the club's foundation on 5 July 1937 until the suspension of sporting activities by Algerian Muslim clubs following the 1956 strike in support of the Algerian War of Independence. It traces the origins of the club, the challenges faced by its founders under the colonial administration, and its sporting journey through the various competitions in which it participated during this period.

Beyond its sporting achievements, the book highlights the significant social and national role played by USM Alger. More than just a football club, it became a symbol of Algerian identity, bringing together supporters, athletes, and members of the nationalist movement at a time when sport served as an important expression of cultural resistance and solidarity. The narrative also presents the contributions of the club's founders, presidents, administrators, coaches, and players who shaped its development between 1937 and 1956.

Drawing on rare archival documents, contemporary newspapers, original photographs, and historical testimonies, the book provides a well documented account of one of the most important periods in the club's history. It offers valuable insight into the relationship between sport and the Algerian national movement, illustrating how USM Alger established itself as one of the country's most influential sporting institutions long before Algeria achieved independence in 1962.

== Acknowledgements ==
In the acknowledgements section, the author expresses his gratitude to the many individuals and institutions who contributed to the research and preparation of the book. He gives special thanks to former USM Alger players, club officials, veteran supporters, Historians, researchers, Archivists, photographers, and members of the National Archives and the Archives of Algiers Province for providing documents, photographs, testimonies, historical information, and guidance. The author also acknowledges the assistance of several families of former players and supporters who granted access to private archives and memorabilia, as well as all those who offered moral support and encouragement throughout the project.

== Historical figures interviewed ==
- Former player of USM Alger Zoubir Bouadjadj.
- Former player of USM Alger Allel Ouaguenouni.
- Former player of USM Alger Zoubir Naït Kaci.
- Former player of USM Alger Abdelkader Berbachi.
- Former player of USM Alger Dahmane Hamadouche.
- Former player of USM Alger Krimo Rebih.
- Former player of USM Alger Rabah Zouaoui.
- Former player of USM Alger Mohamed Oulmi.

== About the author ==
Chaâbane Hammouche, born in 1952, is a retired senior military officer, historian, and researcher. He holds an advanced degree in History as well as a diploma in Scientific Geography. Throughout his career, he has combined his academic interests with a strong commitment to sports and physical education, earning recognition for his contributions in both fields.

Raised in the football-loving neighborhoods of Bab El Oued and Diar el Kef in Algiers, Hammouche grew up in an environment where football was more than a sport it was a way of life. At a time when conversations in these communities rarely strayed from football, USM Alger and MC Alger were the dominant subjects of discussion, shaping his lifelong passion for the game.

From an early age, he played football in his neighborhood, at school, and later in various local and regional military competitions. During the first years following Algeria's independence, he also attended a football school, encouraged by his uncle, Ali Boubghila, known as Ali Chouidi, who was among the pioneering players of USM Alger during the club's inaugural seasons of 1937–38.

Driven by his passion for history and football, Hammouche devoted years to researching the origins and early development of USM Alger. Drawing on archival documents, historical records, and personal testimonies, he has sought to preserve the memory of one of Algeria's most emblematic football clubs and to document its role during the French colonial era.

== Press sources ==
- Alger républicain : journal républicain du matin
- L'Echo d'Alger : journal républicain du matin
- La Dépêche quotidienne : journal républicain du matin
- Le Tell : journal des intérêts coloniaux
- Le Journal d'Alger : Journal officiel de l'Algérie
