= 1941–42 USM Alger season =

USM Alger
1941–42 season
- President: Arezki Meddad (until 2 April 1942)
- Third Division: 7th
- Coupe de la Ligue: Second Round

In the 1941–42 season, USM Alger is competing in the Third Division for the 5th season French colonial era, as well as the Forconi Cup. They will be competing in Third Division, and the Coupe de la Ligue. On April 2, 1942, the board of directors announced the death of their late president, Arezki Meddad and the funeral take place at 12 p.m. meeting 22 boulvard de la Victoire.

== Review ==
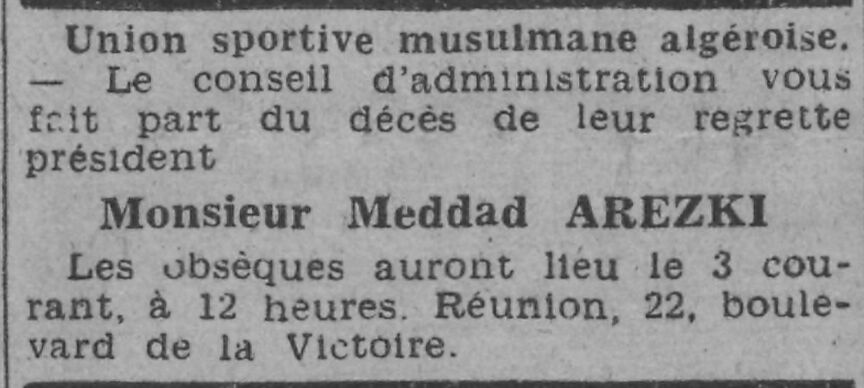
Announcing The death of the club president Arezki Meddad in L'Écho d'Alger newspaper.

The season unfolded under the shadow of a worsening global conflict. World War II was still raging and had grown more intense, especially following the occupation of most of France. Military conscription remained in full force, compounding the challenges faced by football clubs particularly smaller ones with limited resources and capabilities. The management of competitions by the football leagues became increasingly disorganized, leading to widespread doubts, both in official and informal settings, about whether and how the season could be held.

USM Alger began its preparations for the season early, covering both administrative and technical aspects. The club’s management worked on renewing player licenses, registering new recruits, and releasing some of the older players who were no longer part of the team’s plans. The squad resumed its physical and technical training at the Bainem stadium, also making use of civil education halls as part of its preseason program. The core lineup for the season did not undergo significant changes compared to the previous year, and it included several well known players such as: Franck Bailek (GK), Ismaïl Mahmoudi, Mustapha Choudar, Mohamed Bouaroub, Ali Slimani, Mohamed Hamdi, Ramon Bergès, Abdelkader Zouani, Mokrane Hadj Rabia, and Mokrane Karassane.

The season was further overshadowed by a tragic event: on April 2, 1942, Arezki Meddad, the club’s president, died after contracting typhus, a disease that was spreading widely in the country at the time. His death was a great loss for the club, as he had been USMA’s first honorary president, the first treasurer of the inaugural board, and a key member of the executive council. His funeral was held the following day, attended by many members of the community who came to pay their final respects.

== Competitions ==
=== Overview ===
Competition	Record							
Competition	G	W	D	L	GF	GA	GD	Win %
Third Division	14	3	2	9	20	23	−3	21.43
Coupe de la Ligue	2	1	0	1	6	6	+0	50.00
Total	16	4	2	10	26	29	−3	25.00

== League table ==
=== Group C ===
Pos	Team	Pld	W	D	L	F	A	GD	Pts	Notes
1	ASPTT Alger	14	0	0	0	0	0	0	38	
2	AS Ain Taya	14	0	0	0	0	0	0	36	
3	AS Rivet	14	0	0	0	0	0	0	35	
4	USM Maison Carrée	14	0	0	0	0	0	0	24	
5	AS Rovigo	14	0	0	0	0	0	0	24	
6	US Alger	14	0	0	0	0	0	0	23	
7	USM Alger	14	3	2	9	20	23	−3	22	
8	RC Fondouk	14	0	0	0	0	0	0	20	

=== Matches ===
Win Draw Loss

12 October 1941 Round 1	USM Alger	2–4	US Alger	Kouba
		Report

2 November 1941 Round 2	USM Maison Carrée	2–1	USM Alger	Maison-Carrée
				Stadium: Stade Lavigerie

16 November 1941 Round 3	ASPTT Alger	2–1	USM Alger	Baïnem
		Report

23 November 1941 Round 4	USM Alger	6–0	AS Rovigo	Kouba
		Report

14 December 1941 Round 5	USM Alger	3–1	RC Fondouk	Maison-Carrée
				Stadium: Stade Lavigerie

11 January 1942 Round 6	AS Rivet	5–2	USM Alger	Rivet
		Report

28 December 1941 Round 7	AS Ain Taya	?–?	USM Alger	Ain Taya

11 January 1942 Round 8	US Alger	0–0	USM Alger	Saint Eugène
				Stadium: Stade Communal de Saint Eugène

8 February 1942 Round 9	USM Alger	0–1	USM Maison Carrée	Baïnem
		Report

22 February 1942 Round 10	USM Alger	1–1	ASPTT Alger	Baïnem
		Report

1 March 1942 Round 11	AS Rovigo	4–1	USM Alger	Rovigo
		Report

1 March 1942 Round 12	RC Fondouk	2–1	USM Alger	Fondouk

22 March 1942 Round 13	USM Alger	0–1	AS Rivet	Kouba
		Report

29 March 1942 Round 14	USM Alger	2–0	AS Ain Taya	Kouba
		Report

== Coupe de la Ligue ==
5 October 1941 2nd round	USM Alger	0–5	Stade Guyotville	Baïnem
		Report
