= 1938–39 USM Alger season =

USM Alger
1938–39 season
- President: Arezki Meddad
- Third Division: 2nd

In the 1938–39 season, USM Alger competed in the Third Division for the 2nd season French colonial era, as well as the Forconi Cup. They competed in the Third Division.

== Review ==
Following the strong performance displayed by USM Alger in the previous season, the club officially entered the competitive scene within Group B of the Third Division Championship of the Algiers League. The team approached this new challenge with high morale and great determination to continue its upward trajectory in Algerian football. Group B consisted of the following six teams: SC Miliana, RC Koléa, ECS Cherchell, AL Bab El Oued, JS Rovigo and USM Alger. In preparation for the upcoming season’s championship, several meetings were held by the club’s board of directors and the football committee. These meetings aimed to renew various management structures and address any shortcomings observed in the previous season. Additionally, sessions were held with both new and returning players to complete the signing of annual licenses and to organize the necessary physical and technical preparations. A series of friendly matches was also scheduled as part of the pre-season training program.

It is worth noting that the match against ECS Cherchell, originally scheduled to be played at the Blida Stadium, was marked by incidents that reflected the hostile intentions of the colonial authorities toward the club. The match was canceled the first time despite the presence of both teams, after the match commissioner invoked a regulation from French colonial law, claiming that the USM Alger did not include three European players, as allegedly required. Following a formal complaint filed by USM Alger and a review of the commissioner’s report, the league was compelled to postpone the match and reschedule it multiple times. It was finally played in Algiers, at the Le bon Stadium.

== Squad list ==
USM Alger squad list.
1 Abderrahman Ibrir	2 Ivian Oltra	3 Mokrane Hadj Rabia	4 Abdellah Betouche	5 Mouloud Oalmi
6 Ramadan Boumedrar	7 Nacer Nini	8 Benyoucef Benhoura	9 Maâmar Haouari	10 M'hamed Idriss
11 Mouloud Lazizi	12 Saïd Ben Merabet	13 Saïd Bennour	14 Rabah Brahiti	15 Mohamed Hamdi
16 Rodenas	17 Abdelkader Chaouane	18 Yahya Touati	19 Youcef Choubane	20 Slimane Ghanem
21 Omar Filali	22 Ali Chouidi	23 Saïd Chibane	24	25
26	27	28	29	30

== Competitions ==
=== Overview ===
Competition	Record							
Competition	G	W	D	L	GF	GA	GD	Win %
Third Division	10	7	1	2	15	7	+8	70.00
Play-offs	3	2	1	0	6	3	+3	66.67
Total	13	9	2	2	21	10	+11	69.23

== League table ==
=== Group II ===
Pos	Team	Pld	W	D	L	GF	GA	GD	Pts	Qualification
1	E Cherchell S	0	0	0	0	0	0	0	0	Qualified for Playoffs Second Division
2	USM Alger	10	7	1	2	15	7	+8	25	Qualified for Playoffs Second Division
3	RC Koléa	0	0	0	0	0	0	0	0	
4	JS Rovigo	0	0	0	0	0	0	0	0	
5	AL Bab El Oued	0	0	0	0	0	0	0	0	
6	SC Miliana	0	0	0	0	0	0	0	0	Relegated to 1939–40 Four Division

Source: [ L'Echo d'Alger]

=== Matches ===
Win Draw Loss

30 October 1938 Round 1	RC Koléa	3–0	USM Alger	Koléa
14:00		Report

13 November 1938 Round 2	USM Alger	2–2	ECS Cherchell	Baïnem
14:00		Report		Stadium: Stade de Baïnem

27 November 1938 Round 3	USM Alger	w/o	AL Bab El Oued	Baïnem
14:00		Report		Stadium: Stade de Baïnem

4 December 1938 Round 4	SC Miliana	w/o	USM Alger	Miliana
14:00		Report

18 December 1938 Round 5	JS Rovigo	1–0	USM Alger	Rovigo
14:00		Report
Note: forfait général

15 January 1939 Round 6	USM Alger	4–0	RC Koléa	Baïnem
14:00		Report		Stadium: Stade de Baïnem

29 January 1939 Round 7	ECS Cherchell	0–1	USM Alger	Cherchell
14:00		Report

12 February 1939 Round 8	AL Bab El Oued	0–3	USM Alger	Algiers
14:00		Report

26 February 1939 Round 9	USM Alger	w/o	SC Miliana	Baïnem
9:30		Report		Stadium: Stade de Baïnem

12 March 1939 Round 10	USM Alger	5–1	JS Rovigo	Baïnem
14:00		Report		Stadium: Stade de Baïnem

=== Ranking match ===
2 April 1939	ES Cherchell	v	USM Alger	Blida
14:30		[Report https://gallica.bnf.fr/ark:/12148/bpt6k75854334/f4.item.zoom] Report; Report		Stadium: USB Stadium

30 April 1939	ES Cherchell	1–2	USM Alger	Ruisseau, Algiers
15:15		Report		Stadium: Stade Lebon

=== Promotion play-offs ===
7 May 1939	SC Alger	3–0	USM Alger	Ruisseau
15:30	Cristol	Report		Stadium: Stade Lebon; Referee: M. Rippol
