= 1937–38 USM Alger season =

USM Alger
1937–38 season
- President: Ali Zaid
- Stadium: Bainem Stadium or Belfort Stadium
- Third Division: 2nd
- F.S.G.T. Cup: ?
- SAFRAN Cup: Semi-finals
- SENDRA Cup: ?

In the 1937–38 season, USM Alger competed in the Third Division for the 1st season French colonial era, as well as They competed in the F.S.G.T. Cup, SAFRAN Cup and SENDRA Cup.

== Review ==
Despite the differing accounts regarding the identity of USM Alger's first president, the official document dated July 5, 1937, addressed to the Algiers prefecture, clearly confirms that Ali Zaid who would later become a martyr of the Algerian War of Independence was the first official and administrative president of the club. The same document indicates that Arezki Meddad held the role of honorary president, suggesting his symbolic and social influence without occupying a formal administrative position. However, press sources particularly the Alger républicain newspaper dated June 20, 1963 state that the club was founded through the efforts of Arezki Meddad, Ali Zaid and former player Mohamed Hamdi.

This founding committee was composed as follows: President: Ali Zaid, Vice Presidents: Bennaceur Lakhdar, Fernane Taieb, General Secretary: Halit Ali, Assistant General Secretary: Ahmed Kemmat, Treasurer: Arezki Meddad. This initial leadership laid the organizational groundwork for the club and managed its early activities during a period of growing political and social tensions in Algeria.

During that season, USM Alger was placed in a group that included the following teams: JSL Belfort, JS Blida, U Saloumbier FM, JSO Hussein Dey, CP Harrach, PS Orléanvilles and JSO Maison Carrée. According to the competition's rules, each club was required to participate with two teams: a first team and a reserve team, with fixtures scheduled for both on matchdays. During this inaugural season, USM Alger hosted its home matches either at the Bainem Stadium or at the Belfort Stadium, depending on availability and logistical considerations. The first match was on October 17, 1937 against JSO Hussein Dey and it ended in a draw.

== Squad list ==
USM Alger squad list.
1 Sandra (GK)	2 Boualem Midah (GK)	3 Simon Grangeon	4 Ali Chouidi
5 Mohamed Hamdi	6 Mouloud Laazizi	7 Hamid Benali	8 Hamid Bahri
9 Ali Slimani	10 Ali Zemmouri	11 Ibrahim Boudar	12 Mohamed Nadji
13 Omar Lakhal	14 Si M'hamed	15 Maamar Ould Rouis	16 Bachir Kouach
17 Mohamed Oulmi	18 Saïd Saïd	19 Naseri Alasnami	20 Mohamed Bouarroub
21 Ramadan Bouarour

== Competitions ==
=== Overview ===
Competition	Record							
Competition	G	W	D	L	GF	GA	GD	Win %
Fourth Division	14	7	4	3	34	22	+12	50.00
F.S.G.T. Cup	0	0	0	0	0	0	+0	—
SAFRAN Cup	0	0	0	0	0	0	+0	—
SENDRA Cup	0	0	0	0	0	0	+0	—
Total	0	0	0	0	0	0	+0	—

== League table ==
=== Matches ===
Win Draw Loss

17 October 1937 1	USM Alger	2–2	JSO Hussein Dey	Belfort
:		Report		Stadium: Belfort Stadium

24 October 1937 2	PS Orléanvilles	1–0	USM Alger	Orléanvilles
:		Report

3	USM Alger	3–2	JSO Maison Carrée	Bainem
:		Report		Stadium: Bainem Stadium

4	JSL Belfort	2–2	USM Alger	Ruisseau, Algiers
:		Report		Stadium: Stade le Bon

5	USM Alger	2–3	JS Blida	Bainem
:		Report		Stadium: Bainem Stadium

6	U Saloumbier FM	1–1	USM Alger	Hussein Dey
:		Report		Stadium: Stade Hussein Dey

7	CP Harrach	1–3	USM Alger	Belfort
:		Report		Stadium: Belfort Stadium

8	JSO Hussein Dey	3–1	USM Alger	Hussein Dey
:		Report		Stadium: Stade Hussein Dey

9	USM Alger	2–0	PS Orléanvilles	Bainem
:		Report		Stadium: Bainem Stadium

10	JSO Maison Carrée	2–4	USM Alger	?
:		Report		Stadium: Stade Zivacou

11	USM Alger	6–2	JSL Belfort	Bainem
:		Report		Stadium: Bainem Stadium

12	JS Blida	2–2	USM Alger	Blida
:		Report

13	USM Alger	1–0	U Saloumbier FM	Bainem
:		Report		Stadium: Bainem Stadium

14	USM Alger	5–1	CP Harrach	Bainem
:		Report		Stadium: Bainem Stadium

== Local cups ==
Thanks to the team’s strong performance in this trial championship finishing in second place with a respectable points total and due to structural reforms introduced by the League Algiers Football Association and the French Amateur Football Federation (FFFA), which expanded the number of teams across different levels of competition, USM Alger earned well deserved promotion to the Third Division, the following season. USM Alger are allowed to participate in this competition by paying symbolic contributions for the following cup tournaments: the F.S.G.T. Cup, the SAFRAN Cup (reserved for companies), and the SENDRA Cup (for the reserve group B). This group may also take part alongside teams from the corporate and institutional championships affiliated with the ‘Algerian Working Class Organization’ (ALGERIE OUVRIÈRE). All of these are considered local cups, supervised by corporative teams, with a participation fee of 10 francs.
