= Shahid (Algeria) =

Algerian honorary title

Shahid شَهيد
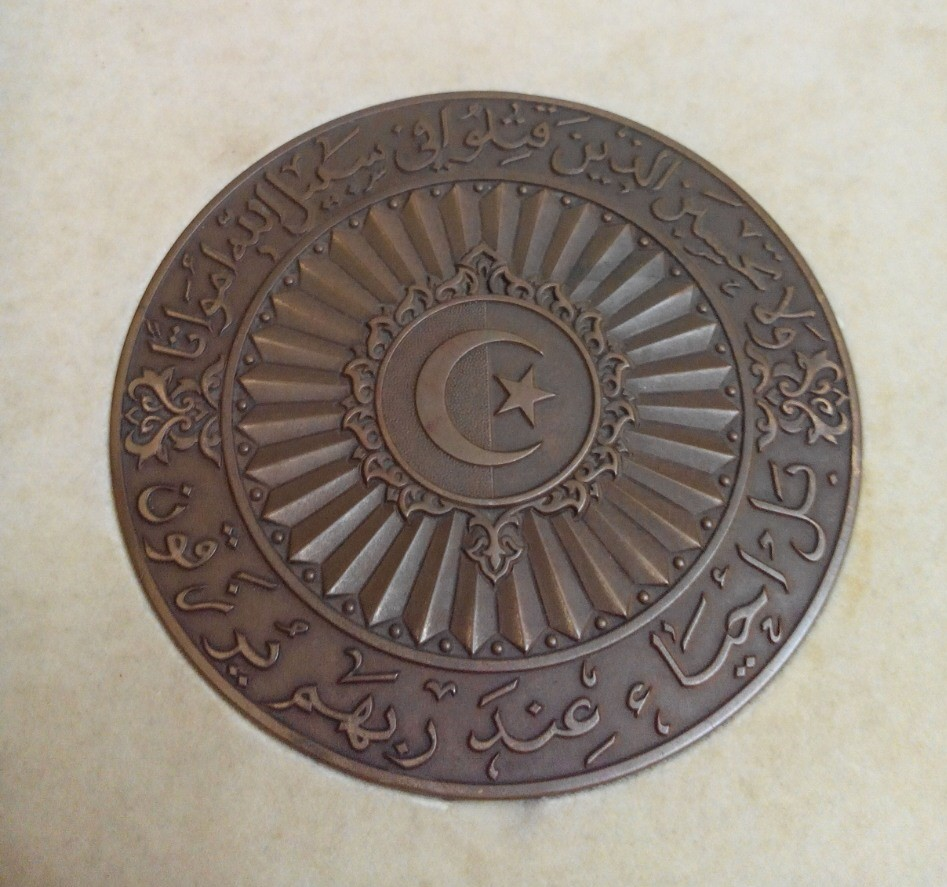
- The medal reads verse 169 of the 3rd Surah of the Quran: Think not of those who are killed in the way of God as dead. Rather, they are alive, with their Lord, well provided for.

A shahid (Arabic: شَهيد, romanized: Shahīd), meaning "martyr", is an official title in Algeria for anyone who died while fighting for the independence movement during the Algerian War.

== Monuments of the martyrs ==
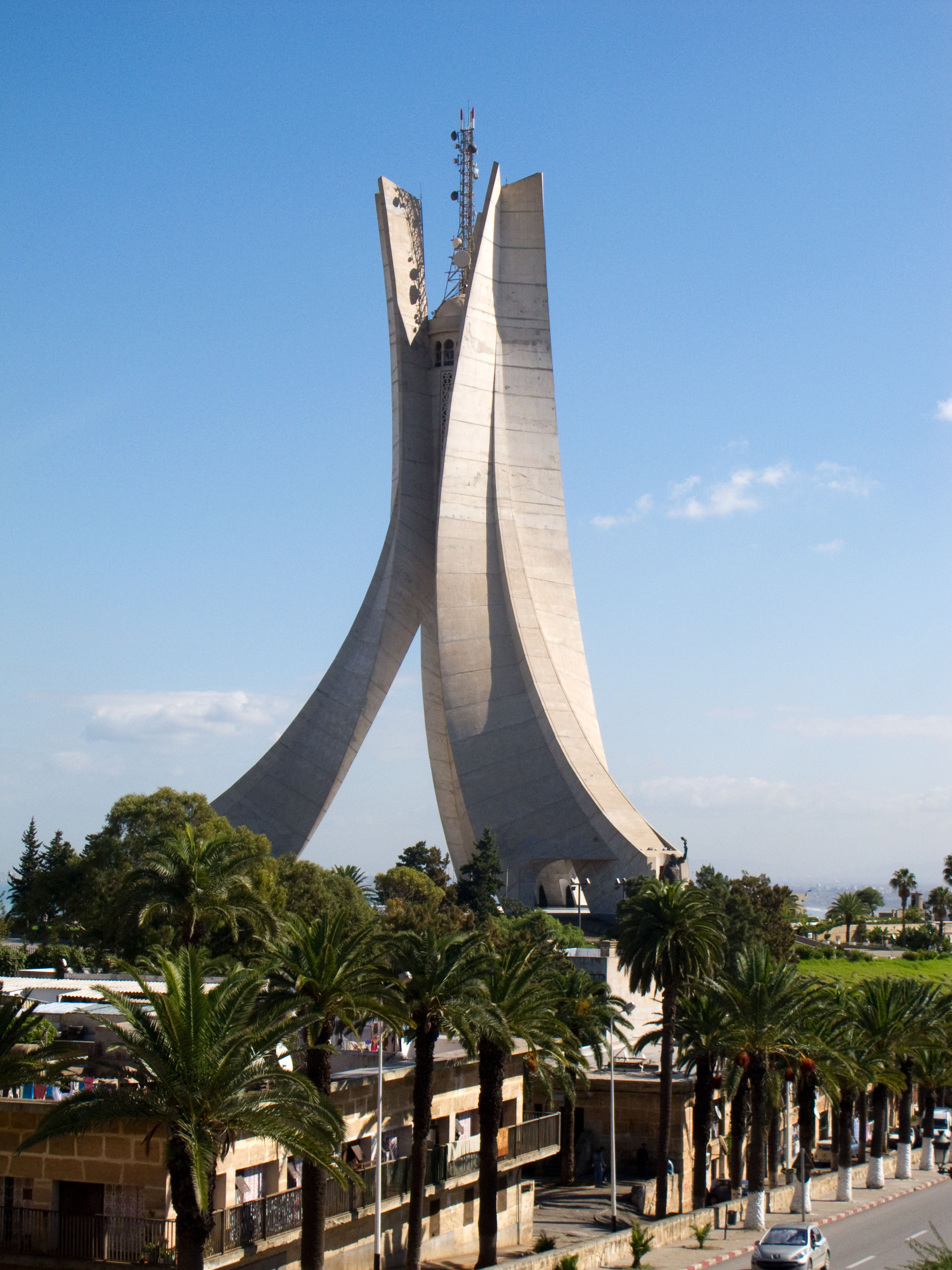
Maqam Echahid, a monument to the martyrs built at end of the war of independence in Algiers.

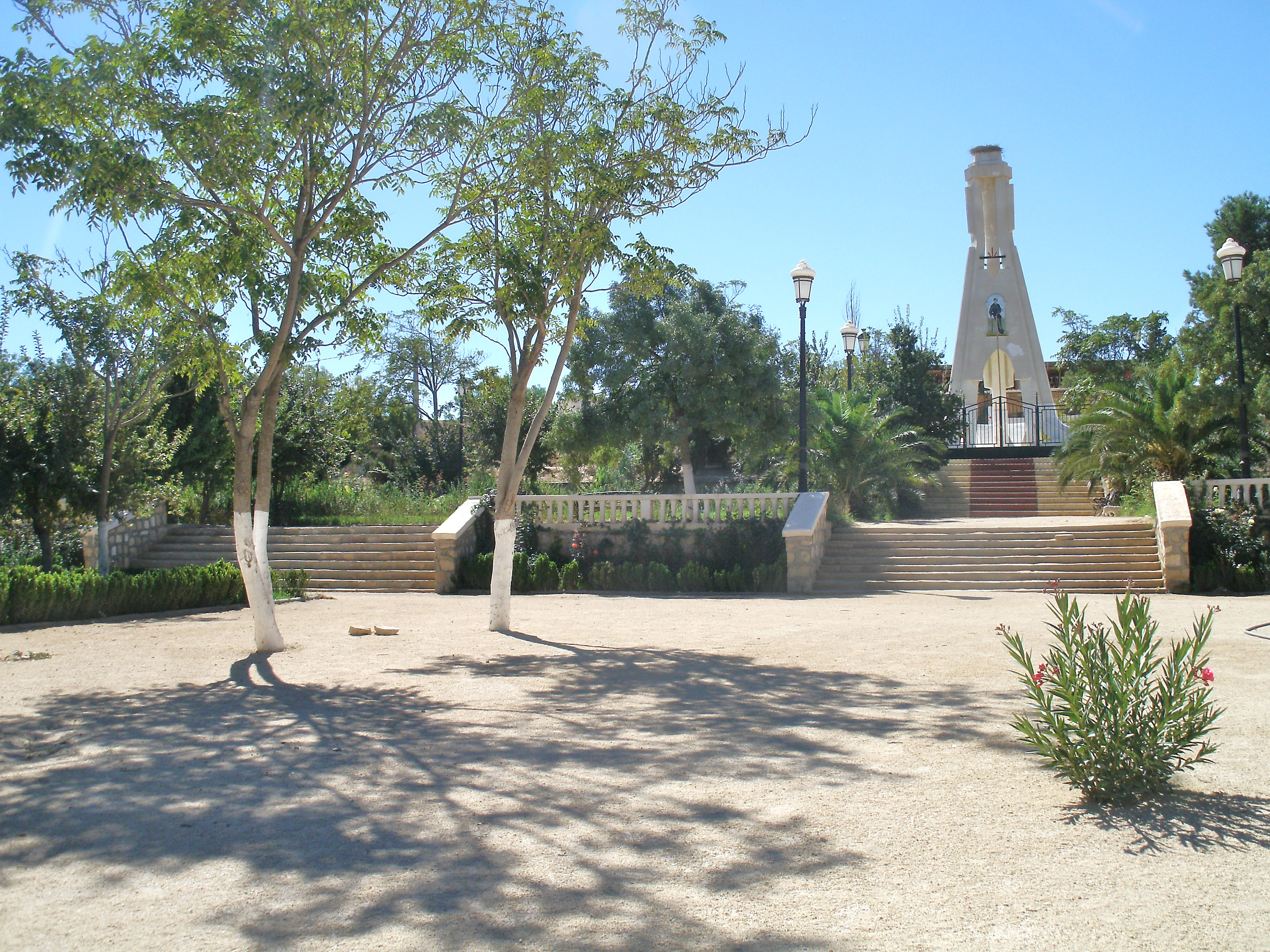
Monument to the Martyrs of the city of Djelfa.

== See also ==
- Algerian War
- Martyr
- Shahid
