= Abderahmane Arbaji =

Algerian nationalist figure

Abderrahmane Arbadji
- Born: 6 March 1929; Casbah Algiers, French Algeria
- Died: 23 February 1957 (aged 27); Casbah Algiers, French Algeria
- Cause of death: Killed in Combat
- Known for: National Liberation Front; National Liberation Army; Algerian War; Battle of Algiers
- Movement: FLN

Abderrahmane Arbadji ((Arabic: عبد الرحمن عرباجي; 6 March 1929 – 23 February 1957) was an Algerian nationalist militant and a fighter in the National Liberation Army (ALN). A key figure of the Battle of Algiers, he was the deputy of Saadi Yacef within the Zone autonome d'Alger (ZAA) and served as the military commander of Region I until his death in combat.

== Early life and education ==
Abderrahmane Arbadji was born at 31 Sidi M’Hamed-Chérif Street, in the Casbah of Algiers, into a modest family deeply committed to the nationalist cause. His father, Lakhdar, was known for his early patriotic engagement in the 1940s and for later joining the Algerian Revolution after its outbreak on 1 November 1954. He began his schooling in Blida before moving to Algiers, studying at M’cid Fatah School (Boulevard de Verdun), and eventually obtained the Primary Education Certificate (CEP) from the Tanger Street School. Like many Algerians of his generation, he was unable to pursue secondary education.

A member of the Muslim Scouts of Algeria (SMA), Arbadji developed a militant spirit and acquired basic paramilitary skills. Passionate about football, Arbadji played in the youth categories of USM Alger (USMA), a club that included several other militants and future martyrs. He later worked for the Post, Telegraph and Telephone services (PTT), a position that allowed him to travel within Algeria and abroad, broadening his political and cultural awareness.

== Revolutionary activity ==
Convinced of the necessity of armed struggle, Arbadji joined the national movement from the early days of the Algerian War. In late 1954, he organized a fidaï (commando) group in the Casbah. In January 1956, alongside Omar Hamadi, Arbadji carried out a major operation: the seizure of weapons and ammunition from the 22nd rural company barracks in Aïn Taya, with support from Saadi Yacef. This marked the beginning of his central role in the armed resistance. After a short period in the maquis of Palestro, Arbadji was recalled to Algiers by Saadi Yacef to strengthen the urban guerrilla network.

== Role in the Zone autonome d'Alger ==
Following the Soummam Congress (20 August 1956), the Zone autonome d'Alger (ZAA) was established. Arbadji was appointed military commander of Region I, with Othmane Hadji (alias Ramel) as his deputy. Arbadji took part in several urban guerrilla actions, including operations targeting prison guards accused of torturing and mistreating prisoners at Barberousse (Serkadji) prison. His effectiveness quickly attracted the attention of the French colonial authorities. His portrait was posted in police stations and military headquarters, and he became one of the most wanted figures of the Casbah, alongside Ali La Pointe, Belkacem Bouchafa, and Saadi Yacef.

== Death and legacy ==
On 23 February 1957, French paratroopers discovered Arbadji’s hideout on Rue du Diable, in the heart of the Casbah of Algiers. Surrounded from all sides, Arbadji refused to surrender and fought until the end. Arbadji was killed in combat at the age of 27, dying with his weapon in hand. Arbadji is remembered as one of the heroes of the Battle of Algiers. Each year, tributes are paid to him in the Casbah by veterans of the Algerian War, children of martyrs, and members of the FLN. His brother Mahmoud Arbadji was also a moudjahid, a member of the FLN’s commando units, and was imprisoned at the Lambèse penal colony.

== See also ==
- Battle of Algiers
- Saadi Yacef
- Ali La Pointe
- Zone autonome d'Alger
