= L'Écho d'Alger =

French newspaper in Algeria (1912–1961)

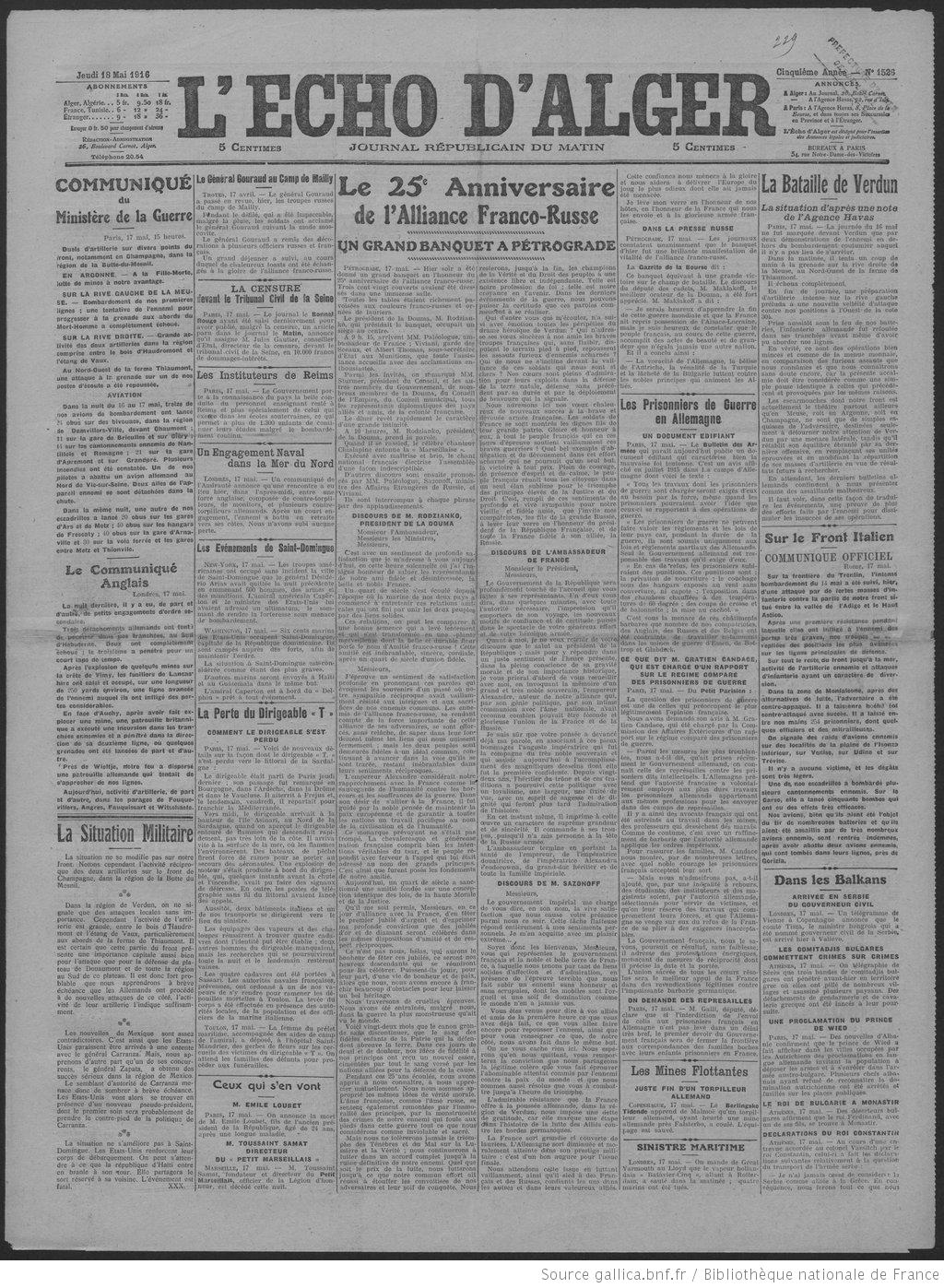
- Cover page dated 18 May 1916
- Type: Daily newspaper
- Founder: Étienne Baïlac
- Founded: 16 March 1912
- Ceased publication: 25 April 1961
- Political alignment: Conservative
- Language: French
- Headquarters: Algiers
- Country: Algeria

L'Echo d'Alger (French: The Echo of Algiers) was a daily newspaper in Algiers, Algeria, which was published between 1912 and 1961. Its subtitle was journal républicain du matin (French: Republican morning paper). It was first a leftist publication, but from 1941 it supported the French rule in Algeria.

== History and profile ==
The first issue of the paper appeared on 16 March 1912. Its founder was Étienne Baïlac, a French journalist born in Algeria. The paper came out daily with combined issues for Sunday and Monday. It had a leftist political stance during its early period.

In 1941 Alain de Sérigny became the editor and publisher of L'Echo d'Alger. Under his editorship which lasted until 1961 the paper had a conservative political stance and supported the rights of the European settlers in Algeria against the French President Charles de Gaulle's support for the self-determination of the country. It was subject to censorship of the French authorities when it contained anti-De Gaulle articles. During this period it had a circulation of 55,000 copies.

On 8 February 1960 its publisher and editor, Alain de Sérigny, was arrested and imprisoned in the Barberousse detention centre. He had been under house arrest since 3 February and was detained due to his alleged role in undermining the internal security of the country. The final issue of the paper was published on 25 April 1961.
