= Hammamet, Algiers =

Coordinates: 36°48′44″N 2°58′17″E

El Hammamet
- Commune and town
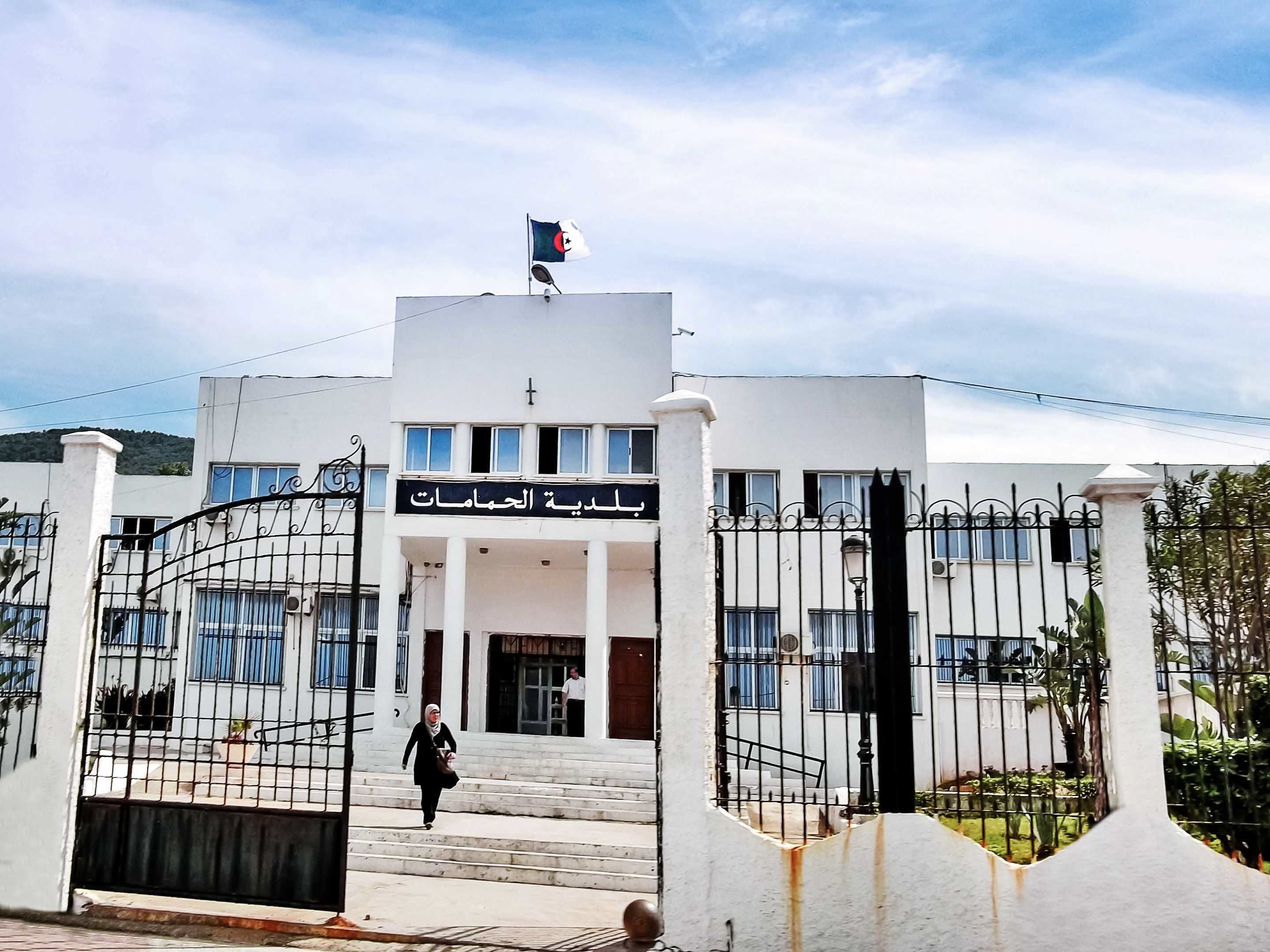
- Interactive map of El Hammamet
- Country: Algeria
- Province: Algiers Province
- District: Chéraga District

Population (1998)
  - Total: 15,879
- Time zone: UTC+1 (CET)

Hammamet or El Hammamet (Arabic: الحمامات, al-Ḥamāmāt, [ʔal ħɑmæmɛːt], Kabyle: Lḥemmamat) is a town and commune in Algiers Province, Algeria. In 1998 the commune had a total population of 15,879.

== See also ==
- Communes of Algeria
