= Arezki Meddad =

Algerian nationalist figure

President of USM Alger
- In office October 1938 – 2 April 1942

Personal details
- Born: 1899 Azeffoun Tizi Ouzou, French Algeria
- Died: 2 April 1942 (aged 42–43) Algiers, French Algeria
- Party: Algerian People's Party (PPA)

Arezki Meddad (Berber languages: ⴰⵔⴻⵣⴽⵉ ⵎⴻⴷⴷⴰⴷ, Arabic: أرزقي مداد; 1899 – 2 April 1942) was an Algerian nationalist figure and one of the founding members of USM Alger. Meddad played a pivotal role in the club’s creation during the French colonial period, becoming its first honorary president in 1937.

== Personal life ==
Arezki Meddad poor family emigrated from Tigounatine in Kabylie, to the Casbah of Algiers. Meddad has only one daughter, Ourida who was an Algerian independence activist and was martyred on August 29, 1957.

== Life and career ==
Arezki Meddad, one of the prominent founding members of USM Alger, was born in 1899 in the Kabylie region, near Azeffoun in Tizi Ouzou Province, into a long established family of farmers for generations. He was the eldest of his siblings. His father was forced to leave their native region due to the harsh conditions of French colonial rule, which weighed heavily on the rebellious Kabylie region at the time. Meddad moved the family to Algiers, when Arezki was no more than three years old. Meddad grew up in the historic Casbah among his peers and learned the Quran, managing to master it through his own dedication and perseverance.

The young Arezki grew up influenced by his surroundings and was deeply interested in religious matters. He became a regular visitor to Nadi Al-Taraqi, which served as the official headquarters of the Association of Algerian Muslim Ulema, where he became an active member. Meddad had a close relationship with Sheikh Tayeb el-Oqbi, who sent him several times on behalf of the association to Constantine to meet Sheikh Abdel-Hamid ibn Badis and Sheikh Larbi Tbessi. Meddad was also a frequent visitor to Café Belhafaf, where he helped establish a charitable association together with some members of the Association. With the rise of the national movement and the expansion of its activities, Arezki Meddad joined the Algerian People's Party (PPA) in 1937, and he contributed significantly to the political struggle alongside some of his brothers and peers.

As part of the ongoing wave of founding national sports clubs that began with the emergence of MC Alger in 1921, and as an effort to establish another national club in the heart of Algiers an idea that had preoccupied many for years the initiative took shape during the 1936–37 sports season, when Arezki Meddad, together with a group of dedicated activists, took the step of founding the Union Sportive Muslmane Algéroise on July 5, 1937.

Arezki contributed everything he could to ensure the success of this new club. Many of his contemporaries affirm that he was the one who proposed giving the club its religious character and defended this idea vigorously. Arezki Meddad also supported the club with his own funds and considerable efforts, helping it enter sports competitions despite the many obstacles it faced. Thanks to his noble character, strong ethics, and wide network of relationships, many nationalists rallied around the club, helping it emerge and take off.

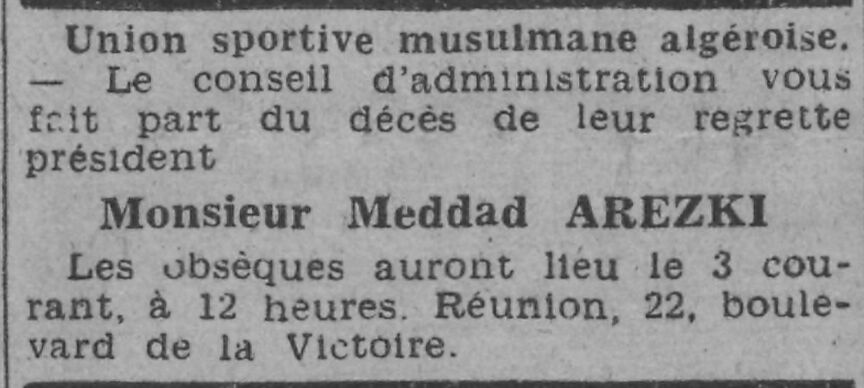
On April 3, 1942 announcing the death of Arezki Meddad in L'Écho d'Alger.

Arezki Meddad owned a popular café on Rue du Divan, which at the time was frequented by many prominent religious, political, and sports figures. In the 1930s, a small prayer room (Musalla) was set up beneath this café where the five daily prayers were held. However, after the creation of USM Alger and as the club’s main premises became too small to accommodate its growing community, Arezki Meddad transformed his café into an additional headquarters for the club, and thus the Musalla was converted into a meeting room where the club’s gatherings and activities were held.

On April 2, 1942, Arezki Meddad, the club’s president, died after contracting typhus, a disease that was spreading widely in the country at the time. His death was a great loss for the club, as he had been USMA’s first honorary president, the first treasurer of the inaugural board, and a key member of the executive council. His funeral was held the following day, attended by many members of the community who came to pay their final respects.
