= 1955–56 USM Alger season =

USM Alger
1955–56 season
- President: Ali Chérifi
- Stadium: Stade Marcel Cerdan
- Second Division: 8th
- Forconi Cup: Withdrawal
- Top goalscorer: League: Mouloud Timsit (4 goals); All: Mouloud Timsit (4 goals)

In the 1955–56 season, USM Alger competed in the Second Division for the 19th season French colonial era, as well as the Forconi Cup. They competed in Second Division, and the Forconi Cup. In 1956, the central management of the National Liberation Front (FLN) decided to cease all sporting activities of Muslim clubs. A meeting was held at the USMA circle on Rue de Bône to decide on the cessation of football. In 1955–56 Second Division, the last season before the independence of Algeria, where on March 4, 1956 in the 16th round against AS Rivet and two games before the end of the season USM Alger withdrew from the tournament, the League of Algiers office registered the packages of many Muslim clubs following the events that occurred at the match between the MC Alger and AS Saint Eugène. In Promotion Honneur, RC Kouba, USM Marengo, WR Belcourt, JS Kabylie, JS El Biar and OM Saint Eugène declared general forfeiture on 11 March 1956.

== Review ==
It is well known that many clubs from Algiers, particularly those in the lower divisions, are facing extremely serious difficulties. Currently, USMA is going through a very grave crisis and is on the verge of withdrawing entirely from the upcoming season.
USMA has not yet submitted its registration to the Football League for the 1955–1956 season, despite the deadline having already passed. There is concern that the registration of the Muslim club from Algiers may not be accepted, even if their officials eventually decide to send it.

— Commentary from Le Journal d'Alger on the situation of USM Alger.

As part of its preparations for the 1955–56 season, USM Alger held several important meetings, including a general assembly on July 10, 1955, followed by a meeting of the new board of directors, chaired by Ali Chérifi, on August 15. However, despite these steps, the club faced a deep internal crisis that threatened its very existence. This instability was reflected in delays in carrying out essential administrative procedures most notably, the failure to submit the club information sheet to the Algiers League, which was already flagged on July 9, 1955. In response to this inaction, the League took a firm stance. The press reported the League’s warnings: La Dépêche announced that USMA was considered "inactive" and risked automatic relegation. L'Écho d'Alger also published a warning from the disciplinary committee, stating that the club risked being excluded if its situation was not resolved quickly.

In September 1955, after internal discussions among its board members, USM Alger confirmed its continued participation in the 1955–56 Second Division Championship. This decision followed a hearing with the league, during which club president Chérifi assured the team's full commitment to completing the season. The league accepted the club’s position, stating that only one match had been delayed. Subsequently, players were called to renew their licenses, and individual negotiations were initiated with key players like Ghanem, Kouiret, Chouchane, and Kouroufi Ahmed regarding their future at the club.

The departure of USM Alger’s veteran and experienced players those who had defended the club’s colors in previous seasons was due to several reasons. Chief among them were: the decision to retire from football entirely, joining the Algerian revolution in response to the call of national duty, or transferring to another team. The league released the program for the Second Division, divided into four groups. USM Alger was placed in Group III, which included the following teams: US Hospitaliers Alger, AS Rivet, AS Douéra, CC Alger, SCM Blida, JS Birtouta, JU Algéroise, FC Sidi Moussa, RAS Algéroise.

Amid the growing revolutionary movement in Algeria, Muslim sports clubs began withdrawing from official French organized competitions in response to the call of the National Liberation Front (FLN). The FLN urged all Algerian athletes and clubs to cease participation as a rejection of colonial control and in support of the national cause. On March 19, 1956, Le Journal d’Alger reported: "The competition lineup was diminished by the withdrawal of USM Alger and CC Alger, who declared they were abandoning the tournament." This decision became official starting from the match scheduled on March 25, 1956, at Stade Marcel Cerdan, where USM Alger was set to face JS Birtouta. The club's absence made clear that USM Alger had withdrawn from the competition, alongside several other nationalist leaning Muslim clubs, in obedience to the FLN’s directive. Despite not completing the season, USMA was ranked 8th in the final standings evidence of the club’s competitive level before its withdrawal.

== Squad list ==
USM Alger squad list.
1 Mouloud Timsit	2 Mohamed Larbi	3 Allel Ouaguenouni	4 Mohamed Kherouni	5 Ali Gherbi
6 Omar Zenagui	7 M'hamed Ben Ali	8 Youcef Bouaza	9 Ahmed Halimi	10 Abderahmane Bouabdallah
11 Abdelkader Belkraoui	12 M'hamed Rouane	13 Abdelkader Berbachi	14 Abdelkader Kessar	15 Boumaaza M'hamed
16 Mohamed Tazairte	17 Maidi Achour	18 Rabah Channouf	19 Hamid Bernaoui	20 Mustapha Boudissa
21 Abdelkader Chemlal	22	23	24	25

== Transfers ==
Several players left the team, with some joining the National Liberation Army, while others chose to pursue new experiences with different clubs. Among the players who departed were goalkeeper Maâmar Azef, goalkeeper Hasaine, Mustapha Ouaguenouni, Zoubir Naït Kaci, Saadi Yacef, Mohamed Chibane, Mohamed Hamdi, Boualem Djoumai, Omar Ferrad, Rabah Bedaréne, Abdelkader Tchico, Kamel Lounas, and Abderrahmane Haddad. The departure of these players veterans and experienced footballers who had defended the club’s colors in previous seasons was due to several reasons. The main factors included their permanent retirement from football, their commitment to the revolution in response to the call of national duty, and their transfer to other clubs.

=== In ===
Pos	Player	From club

=== Out ===
Pos	Player	To club
	Boualem Mekkiri	SCU El Biar
GK	Maâmar Azef	ASPTT Alger
	Mohamed Meftouch	OM Saint-Eugène
	Otmane Tail	OM Saint-Eugène
	Zoubir Naït Kaci	OM Saint-Eugène
	Kamel Lounas	AS Saint Eugène

== Competitions ==
=== Overview ===
Competition	Record								Started round	Final position / round	First match	Last match
Competition	G	W	D	L	GF	GA	GD	Win %	Started round	Final position / round	First match	Last match
Second Division	18	5	5	8	22	39	−17	27.78	—N/a	8th	2 October 1955	25 March 1956
Forconi Cup	0	0	0	0	0	0	+0	—	First round	Withdrawal		
Total	18	5	5	8	22	39	−17	27.78				

== League table ==
=== Group III ===
Pos	Team	Pld	W	D	L	GF	GA	GD	Pts	Qualification
1	AS Rivet	0	0	0	0	0	0	0	0	Qualified for Playoffs Second Division
2	JS Birtouta	0	0	0	0	0	0	0	0	Qualified for Playoffs Second Division
3	FC Sidi Moussa	0	0	0	0	0	0	0	0	
4	JU Alger	0	0	0	0	0	0	0	0	
5	SCM Blida	0	0	0	0	0	0	0	0	
6	US Hospitaliers Alger	0	0	0	0	0	0	0	0	
7	CC Alger	0	0	0	0	0	0	0	0	
8	USM Alger	18	5	5	8	22	39	−17	33	
9	RAS Algéroise	0	0	0	0	0	0	0	0	Relegated to 1956–57 Third Division
10	AS Douéra	0	0	0	0	0	0	0	0	Relegated to 1956–57 Third Division

Source: [ L'Echo d'Alger]

==== Results by round ====
Round	1	2	3	4	5	6	7	8	9	10	11	12	13	14	15	16	17	18
Ground	H	A	H	A	H	A	A	H	A	A	H	A	H	A	H	H	A	H
Result	W	L	L	L	L	D	D	W	D	L	W	L	W	D	D	W	L	L
Position																		8

Updated to match(es) played on 21 June 2025. Source: Competitive matches
A = Away; H = Home; W = Win; D = Draw; L = Loss

=== Matches ===
Win Draw Loss

2 October 1955 (Note: The match was originally to be played on 25 September 1955, but it was postponed.) Round 1	USM Alger	1–0	JU Alger	Bab El Oued
9:10	Mohamed Larbi 44'; Abdelkader Chemlal (red card)	Report		Stadium: Stade Marcel Cerdan; Referee: M. Graziani
Note: Lineup for USM Alger - Berbachi, X, Kessar, Kherouni, X, X, X, Chemlal, X, X, X.

9 October 1955 Round 2	SCM Blida	3–1	USM Alger	Blida
9:40	Derradji; Guergadj Mohamed; Ali-Abdessemeud Boumédiène	Report	M'hamed Ben Ali	Stadium: FCB Stadium; Referee: M. Moulay
Note: Lineup for USM Alger - , , , , , , , , , , .

16 October 1955 Round 3	USM Alger	0–1	AS Douéra	Bab El Oued
15:00		Report	Soler Michel 40'	Stadium: Stade Marcel Cerdan; Referee: M. Boccechiampe
Note: Lineup for USM Alger - Berbachi, Rouane, Kessar, Ouaguenouni, Kherouni, Chemlal, Ben Ali, Boumaiza, Larbi, Timsit, Djellouli.

30 October 1955 Round 4	US Hospitaliers Alger	6–0	USM Alger	Algiers
9:10	Fekir; Antiori; Kybilène; Moattes	Report		Stadium: Stade Curtillet; Referee: M. Attanasio A.
Note: Lineup for USM Alger - , , , , , , , , , , .

6 November 1955 Round 5	USM Alger	1–2	FC Sidi Moussa	Bab El Oued
9:40	Mouloud Timsit 75'	Report	Hussenot 29', 65'	Stadium: Stade Marcel Cerdan; Referee: M. Martinez
Note: Lineup for USM Alger - Berbachi, Rouane, Kessar, Kherouni, Timsit, Zenagui, Halimi, Chemlal, Ouaguenouni, Guebli, Yahiaoui.

20 November 1955 Round 6	RAS Algéroise	1–1	USM Alger	Algiers
14:40			Allel Ouaguenouni	Stadium: Stade Curtillet; Referee: M. Bellengnier
Note: Lineup for USM Alger - , , , , , , , , , , .

27 November 1955 Round 7	AS Rivet	2–2	USM Alger	Rivet
	Zidane 50' (pen.); Carlhian I 87'	Report	Mohamed Kherouni 60'; Mouloud Timsit 70'	Stadium: Stade Rivet
Note: Lineup for USM Alger - , , , , , , , , , , .

11 December 1955 Round 8	USM Alger	4–3	CC Alger	Bab El Oued
	Allel Ouaguenouni; Mouloud Timsit; Mohamed Kherouni			Stadium: Stade Marcel Cerdan
Note: Lineup for USM Alger - , , , , , , , , , , .

18 December 1955 Round 9	JS Birtouta	1–1	USM Alger	Birtouta
	Ferrer 70'	Report	Mouloud Timsit 5'	Stadium: Stade Birtouta; Referee: M. Grech
Note: Lineup for USM Alger - , , , , , , , , , , .

15 January 1956 Round 10	JU Alger	2–1	USM Alger
			Youcef Bouaza
Note: Lineup for USM Alger - , , , , , , , , , , .

22 January 1956 Round 11	USM Alger	4–1	SCM Blida	Bab El Oued
	Ahmed Halimi (?); Omar Zenagui (?); Mohamed Larbi (?); Abderahmane Bouabdallah (?)			Stadium: Stade Marcel Cerdan
Note: Lineup for USM Alger - , , , , , , , , , , .

29 January 1956 Round 12	AS Douéra	4–1	USM Alger	Douéra
	? 15'; ? 25'; ? 75'; ? (?)		Ali Gherbi 83'	Stadium: Stade du Douéra
Note: Lineup for USM Alger - , , , , , , , , , , .

5 February 1956 Round 13	USM Alger	3–2	US Hospitaliers Alger	Bab El Oued
9h30	Ali Gherbi; Omar Zenagui; Mohamed Larbi			Stadium: Stade Marcel Cerdan
Note: Lineup for USM Alger - , , , , , , , , , , .

12 February 1956 Round 14	FC Sidi Moussa	0–0	USM Alger	Sidi Moussa
Note: Lineup for USM Alger - Berbachi, Djellouli, Rouane, Kherouni, Chemlal, Timsit, Bouabdallah, Bernaoui, Mekkiri, Larbi, Belkraoui.

19 February 1956 Round 15	USM Alger	1–1	RAS Algéroise	Bab El Oued
	Abdelkader Belkraoui			Stadium: Stade Marcel Cerdan
Note: Lineup for USM Alger - , , , , , , , , , , .

4 March 1956 Round 16	CC Alger	0–1	USM Alger	Algiers
		Report		Stadium: Stade Benrouillah
Note: Lineup for USM Alger - , , , , , , , , , , .

11 March 1956 Round 17	USM Alger	0–7	AS Rivet	Bab El Oued
				Stadium: Stade Marcel Cerdan
Note: Lineup for USM Alger - , , , , , , , , , , .

25 March 1956 Round 18	USM Alger	0–3	JS Birtouta
		Report
Note: Lineup for USM Alger - , , , , , , , , , , .

=== Forconi Cup ===
As part of its efforts to enhance the competition and ensure fair play, the League approved during its General Assembly a new system to determine the qualifying team in the League Cup (Coupe Edmond Forconi) matches that serve as qualifiers for the North African Cup, in the event of a draw. According to this system, goal difference will be the primary criterion, with goals scored during extra time also taken into account. If the draw persists, qualification will be granted to the team that scored the first goal. In the case of a goalless draw (0-0), the number of corner kicks will be considered, with the team having the greater number advancing. If both teams are equal in the number of corners, the team that took the first corner kick of the match will qualify.

The draw for the first round of the League Cup was held, with the notable absence of three teams from the second division, including USM Alger. These teams were not included in the draw due to their failure to register, suggesting a possible withdrawal from the competition. In a related development, the schedules for the youth categories, particularly the U21s, were released without any mention of USM Alger, indicating that the club’s management has yet to confirm the participation of its youth teams for the upcoming season.

== Squad information ==
=== Goalscorers ===
Includes all competitive matches. The list is sorted alphabetically by surname when total goals are equal.

Nat.	Player	D2	TOTAL
(France)	Mouloud Timsit	4	4
(France)	Mohamed Larbi	3	3
(France)	Allel Ouaguenouni	2	2
(France)	Mohamed Kherouni	2	2
(France)	Ali Gherbi	2	2
(France)	Omar Zenagui	2	2
(France)	M'hamed Ben Ali	1	1
(France)	Youcef Bouaza	1	1
(France)	Ahmed Halimi	1	1
(France)	Abderahmane Bouabdallah	1	1
(France)	Abdelkader Belkraoui	1	1
Own Goals		0	0
Totals		22	22
