= 1953–54 USM Alger season =

USM Alger
1953–54 season
- President: Ali Chérifi
- Stadium: Stade Marcel Cerdan, Algiers
- First Division: 9th
- Forconi Cup: Third Round

In the 1953–54 season, USM Alger was competing in the Second Division for the 17th season French colonial era, as well as the Forconi Cup. They competed in First Division, and the Forconi Cup.

== Review ==
The board subsequently held several follow up meetings, the most significant being on June 19, during which it was decided to open license renewals for returning players and to begin signing licenses for new players starting, July 2, 1953. On July 8, the board met again with both returning and new players in preparation for their presentation to the coach on August 9, after undergoing a preliminary medical check-up on August 6, with special focus on the new signings. Physical training sessions began on August 12, 1953, at the club's physical education hall and on the Stade Marcel Cerdan, as part of a comprehensive training program to prepare for the start of the championship.

== Squad list ==
Players and squad numbers last updated on 4 October 1953.
Note: Flags indicate national team as has been defined under FIFA eligibility rules. Players may hold more than one non-FIFA nationality.

Maamar Azef (GK), Bellout (GK), Allel Ouaguenouni, Mustapha Ouaguenouni, Zoubir Bouadjadj, Rabah Zouaoui, Zoubir Naït Kaci, Hamid Chibane, Yacef Saâdi, Boualem Mekkiri, Rabah Hassan, Abdelkader Belkraoui, Abdelkader Tchikou, Ramadan Achir, Abdallah Tadjouni, Rabah Bedarane, Abdelkader Kassar, Mostapha Bouazzaz, Ali Hamel, Boualem Rekkal, Mohamed Samghouni, Zoubir Bengnife, Ahmed Kherouni, Abderrahmene Hamdouche, Massoud Bouchakour, Abderrahmene Ben Arrafa, Hamid Ben Ali, Mohamed Seghane, Youssef Babassi, Mohamed Ben Salem, Mohamed Belarbi, Mostapha Kouirat, Chaaban Atti, Abderrahmene Ammari, Mohamed Challali, Abdelkader Maamani, Chaaban Ouair, Loui Fourmak.

— Squad of 1953–54 USM Alger season.

== Transfers ==
The complete list of transfers in the Algiers league (F.F.F.).

=== In ===
Pos	Player	From club
	Maàmani Abdelkader	MC Alger
	Hammoudi Rachid	MC Alger
	Zenagui Omar	MC Alger
	Neggazi Mohamed	JSM Algérois
	Pokal	CC Algérois

=== Out ===
Pos	Player	To club
	Taïb Atmane	AST Algérois
	Ouaret Mahfoud	ASPTT Alger
	Bouhalissa Chérif	RC Kouba

== Competitions ==
=== Overview ===
Competition	Record								Started round	Final position / round	First match	Last match
Competition	G	W	D	L	GF	GA	GD	Win %	Started round	Final position / round	First match	Last match
First Division	18	3	4	11	21	38	−17	16.67	—N/a	9th	4 October 1953	3 April 1954
Forconi Cup	2	1	0	1	4	4	+0	50.00	Second Round	Third Round	20 September 1953	11 October 1953
Total	20	4	4	12	24	41	−17	20.00				

=== First Division ===
==== League table ====
First Division Groupe III
Pos	Team	Pld	W	D	L	GF	GA	GD	Pts	Qualification
6	SC Algérois	18	7	3	8	0	0	0	35	
7	US Blida	18	3	5	10	0	0	0	29	
8	GS Alger Hydra	18	3	4	11	0	0	0	28	
9	USM Alger	18	3	4	11	21	38	−17	28	Relegated to 1954–55 Second Division
10	OM Ruisseau	18	2	4	12	0	0	0	26	Relegated to 1954–55 Second Division

Source: L'Echo d'Alger

==== Results by round ====
Round	1	2	3	4	5	6	7	8	9	10	11	12	13	14	15	16	17	18
Ground	A	H	A	H	A	H	H	A	H	H	A	H	A	H	A	A	H	A
Result	L	D	D	L	L	L	L	D	W	D	L	W	L	L	L	L	W	L
Position				8		10	10	10	9	8	8	8	9	9	9	9	9	8

Updated to match(es) played on 14 May 1952. Source: Competitive matches
A = Away; H = Home; W = Win; D = Draw; L = Loss

=== Matches ===
Win Draw Loss

4 October 1953 Round 2	USM Alger	2–2	SC Algérois	Algiers
	Mohamed Abderezak; Zoubir Naït Kaci	Report	Mahieddine; Bérah	Stadium: Stade Marcel Cerdan; Referee: Jaude

20 October 1953 Round 3	US Blida	1–1	USM Alger	Blida
	Cario	Report	Zoubir Naït Kaci	Stadium: USB Stadium; Referee: Belkessa

25 October 1953 Round 4	USM Alger	1–3	USM Marengo	Algiers
	Yacef 79'	Report	Bouanen; Guendouze	Stadium: Stade Marcel Cerdan; Referee: Mazochie

1 November 1953 Round 1	JS El Biar	1–0	USM Alger	El Biar
	Gharbi 52'	Report		Referee: Di Méglio

15 November 1953 Round 5	OCB Oued-Fodda	5–2	USM Alger	Oued Fodda
	Tahiri 22', 80'; Ferandis 27', 40', 55'	Report	Rabah Zouaoui 20', 75'	Referee: Bertouche

22 November 1953 Round 6	USM Alger	1–2	RC Kouba	Algiers
	Dahmane Hamadouche 5'	Report	Bouchercher 7'; Zitouni 75'	Stadium: Stade Marcel Cerdan; Referee: Belkessa

29 November 1953 Round 7	USM Alger	0–2	Olympique Littoral	Algiers
		Report	Ramdani 55'; Vidal 74'	Stadium: Stade Marcel Cerdan

20 December 1953 Round 8	GS Alger Hydra	1–1	USM Alger	Hydra
	Garcia (?)	Report	Rabah Zouaoui 25'	Referee: Kaddouch

27 December 1953 Round 9	USM Alger	3–0	OM Ruisseau	Algiers
	Zoubir Naït Kaci 52', 60'; Mohamed Abderezak 86'	Report		Stadium: Stade Marcel Cerdan; Referee: Roméro

2 January 1954 Round 10	USM Alger	0–0	JS El Biar	Algiers
		Report		Stadium: Stade Marcel Cerdan; Referee: Derradji

9 January 1954 Round 11	SC Algérois	1–0	USM Alger	Algiers
		Report		Stadium: Stade Marcel Cerdan; Referee: Lebeuvant

23 January 1954 Round 12	USM Alger	4–2	US Blida	Algiers
	Mustapha Ouaguenouni (?); Zoubir Naït Kaci (?); Ahmed Kherouni (?)	Report		Stadium: Stade Marcel Cerdan; Referee: Roméro

6 February 1954 Round 13	USM Marengo	5–0	USM Alger	Marengo
	Gandouze; Bouanéme; Touami	Report		Stadium: Stade Municipal de Marengo

20 February 1954 Round 14	USM Alger	0–2	OCB Oued-Fodda	Algiers
		Report	Bernardi; Ferrandis	Stadium: Stade Marcel Cerdan; Referee: Graziani

27 February 1954 Round 15	RC Kouba	4–1	USM Alger	Kouba
	Bensemane II 38'; Guerienzi I 80', 83'; Bouzened 87'	Report	Ouaguenouni 89'	Referee: Di Meglio

6 March 1954 Round 16	Olympique Littoral	3–0	USM Alger	Castiglione
	Bagdadi 44', 65', 70'	Report		Referee: Fourie

20 March 1954 Round 17	USM Alger	3–2	GS Alger Hydra	Algiers
	Boualem Mekkiri 40'; Mohamed Abderezak (?); Ramadan Achir 70'	Report	? 2'; Massa 30'	Stadium: Stade Marcel Cerdan

3 April 1954 Round 18	OM Ruisseau	2–1	USM Alger	Kouba
		Report	Mohamed El Arbi 38'

== Forconi Cup ==
20 September 1953 Second Round	Olympique Littoral	2–3	USM Alger	Zéralda
	Beynet 30'; Zarah 65'	Report	Mohamed Abderezak 2'; Saadi Yacef 38'; Boualem Moudhab 41'	Attendance: 400; Referee: Graziani

11 October 1953 Third Round	JS Isserville les Issers	2–1	USM Alger	Fondouk
	Moktani; Pierson	Report	Zoubir Naït Kaci	Referee: Pellegrineschi

== Squad information ==
=== Playing statistics ===
In rounds 8, 9, 10, 15, 16 and Second Round of Forconi Cup, it is not known who was the player who participated, Allel or Mustapha Ouaguenouni.

Pos.	Player	First Division																		FC		Total
Pos.	Player	1	2	3	4	5	6	7	8	9	10	11	12	13	14	15	16	17	18	1	2	Total
GK	(France) Bellout		X	X	X				X	X	X	X	X		X					X	X	11
GK	(France) Maammar Azef	X				X	X	X								X	X		X			7
CB	(France) Mustapha Ouaguenouni	X	X	X	X	X							X		X						X	8
RB	(France) Dahmane Hamadouche				X	X	X	X			X	X	X						X			8
RB	(France) Hacène Chabri																					
LB	(France) Allel Ouaguenouni	X		X	X	X	X	X				X			X							8
LB	(France) Zoubir Bouadjadj			X	X	X	X		X	X	X	X										8
FW	(France) Rabah Zouaoui					X	X		X	X	X	X				X						7
	(France) Zoubir Naït Kaci	X	X	X	X	X	X	X	X	X	X	X	X		X		X		X	X	X	17
FW	(France) Saadi Yacef	X	X	X	X	X	X		X		X	X				X	X			X	X	13
	(France) Abdelkader Tchico										X				X	X	X			X		5
	(France) Abdelkader Belkaraoui	X							X							X	X					4
	(France) Hamid Chibane	X	X		X	X	X	X		X			X		X					X		10
	(France) Boualem Mekkiri		X	X	X				X			X	X		X		X		X	X	X	11
	(France) Mohamed Abderezak	X	X	X		X	X	X	X	X		X			X	X	X		X	X	X	15
	(France) Rabah Hassan		X		X															X		3
	(France) Ramadan Achir	X	X	X	X	X	X	X	X	X	X	X	X		X	X	X		X	X	X	18
	(France) Boualem Mouhdab		X										X		X					X		4
	(France) Abdelkader Kessar			X												X					X	3
	(France) Mohamed Samghouni	X	X	X						X	X										X	6
	(France) Moustapha Kouirat						X	X	X	X	X	X	X		X	X			X			10
	(France) Rabah Bedaréne	X																				1
	(France) Abderrahmane Ammari									X							X					2
	(France) Mohamed Larbi							X					X						X			3
	(France) Mohamed Ben Salem							X								X						2
	(France) Mohamed Seghane							X														1
	(France) Zoubir Ben Guenife																					
	(France) Ali Hamel																					
	(France) Moustapha Bouaazzaz																					
	(France) Abdallah Tadjouni																					
	(France) Chaabane Atti																					
	(France) Youcef Babasi																					
	(France) Messaoud Bouchakour																					
	(France) Abderrahmane Ben Arrafa																					
	(France) Ahmed Kherouni												X				X					2
	(France) Hamid Benali																					
	(France) Chaabane Ouayer																					
	(France) Mohamed Challali																		X			1
	(France) Louis Fourmak																				X	1
	(France) Abdelkader Maamani																					
	(France) Keddour																				X	1
	(France) Boualem Rekkal																		X			1
	(France) Rachid Hammoudi																		X			1

=== Goalscorers ===
Includes all competitive matches. The list is sorted alphabetically by surname when total goals are equal.

Nat.	Player	Pos.	PD	FC	TOTAL
(France)	Zoubir Naït Kaci		5	1	6
(France)	Mohamed Abderezak	FW	3	1	4
(France)	Rabah Zouaoui	FW	3	0	3
(France)	Saadi Yacef	FW	1	1	2
(France)	Mustapha Ouaguenouni	DF	2	0	2
(France)	Dahmane Hamadouche "Bisco"	RB	1	0	1
(France)	Ahmed Kherouni		1	0	1
(France)	Ouaguenouni	DF	1	0	1
(France)	Boualem Mekkiri		1	0	1
(France)	Ramadan Achir		1	0	1
(France)	Boualem Moudhab		1	0	1
(France)	Mohamed Larbi		1	0	1
Own Goals			0	0	0
Totals			21	4	25
