= 1948–49 USM Alger season =

USM Alger
1948–49 season
- Chairman: Mohamed Bensiam
- Stadium: Stade La Consolation, Bab El Oued
- First Division: 6th
- Forconi Cup: First round

In the 1948–49 season, USM Alger was competing in the First Division for the 12th season French colonial era, as well as in the Forconi Cup.

== Review ==
On July 17, 1948, USM Alger celebrated its annual anniversary, as usual, with a festive evening held in the new municipal hall. A large number of athletes and supporters attended to encourage this young institution. The evening was lively and rich in entertainment, featuring the play “Si Meziane” performed by Madame Hattab, as well as a performance by the rising artist Mahieddine Bachtarzi, who was just beginning to make a name for himself on the cultural scene. On August 2, 1948, USM Alger held a general assembly that brought together both former and new players at the club’s headquarters, with the aim of preparing for the new season and strengthening team cohesion. A few days later, starting on August 12, physical and technical training resumed, taking place in the new sports hall as well as on various available pitches. For this season, it was decided that USMA would host its opponents during championship matches at the Bab El Oued Stadium, then called La Consolation (formerly known as Stade d’Alger). This decision finally provided the club with a permanent home ground for its official fixtures.

== Squad list ==
USM Alger squad list.
1 Hassan Chabri	2 Abdelkader Djaknoun	3 Rabah Bedaréne	4 Ammar Chaouane	5 Hassen Zitouni
6 Abdelkader Chaouane	7 Ahmed Azzouz	8 Zoubir Naït Kaci	9 Allel Ouaguenouni	10 Mustapha Ouaguenouni
11 Rabah Zouaoui	12 Mohamed Hamdi	13 Rabah Bedaréne	14	15
16	17	18	19	20
21	22	23	24	25
26	27	28	29	30

== Competitions ==
=== Overview ===
Competition	Record							
Competition	G	W	D	L	GF	GA	GD	Win %
First Division	18	6	6	6	24	22	+2	33.33
Forconi Cup	3	2	0	1	2	3	−1	66.67
Total	21	8	6	7	26	25	+1	38.10

== First Division ==
=== League table ===
==== Group B ====
Pos	Team	Pld	W	D	L	F	A	GD	Pts	Notes
1	Stade Guyotville	18	0	0	0	0	0	0	50	
2	Olympique Marengo	18	0	0	0	0	0	0	42	
3	Olympique Rouiba	18	0	0	0	0	0	0	38	
4	Olympique Littoral	18	0	0	0	0	0	0	38	
5	SC Algérois	18	0	0	0	0	0	0	37	
6	USM Alger	18	6	6	6	24	22	+2	36	
7	US Blida	18	0	0	0	0	0	0	36	
8	ÉS Zéralda	18	0	0	0	0	0	0	36	
9	AS Montpensier	18	0	0	0	0	0	0	25	
10	ÉS Cherchell	18	0	0	0	0	0	0	22	

=== Matches ===
Win Draw Loss

10 October 1948 Round 1	USM Alger	0–2	Olympique Rouiba	Bab El Oued
14:00		Report	Allés (?)	Stadium: Stade La Consolation; Referee: Roméro

31 October 1948 Round 2	USM Alger	4–3	ÉS Zéralda	Bab El Oued
14:00	Azouz (?); Nait Kaci (?); Chabri (?)	Report	Tur (?); Marguier (?); Simo (?)	Stadium: Stade La Consolation; Referee: Amar

12 November 1948 Round 3	ÉS Cherchell	1–1	USM Alger	Cherchell
14:00	Bernard (?)	Report	Ouaguenouni (?)	Referee: Gristi

14 November 1948 Round 4	Olympique Marengo	2–1	USM Alger	Marengo
14:00	Cato (?); Turbessy 85'	Report	Azouz (?)	Stadium: Stade communal de Marengo; Referee: Moussaoui

6 February 1949 Round 5 (late)	Stade Guyotville	2–1	USM Alger	Bab El Oued
14:00		Report		Stadium: Stade La Consolation

28 November 1948 Round 6	USM Alger	3–1	AS Montpensier	Fort de l'Eau
14:00	Azouz (?); Bedareb (?); Zouaoui (?)	Report	Robert (?)	Referee: Touat

12 December 1948 Round 7	SC Algérois	1–0	USM Alger	Bab El Oued
14:00	Bouajej (?)	Report		Stadium: Stade La Consolation; Referee: Bouzid

19 December 1948 Round 8	USM Alger	0–0	Olympique Littoral	Bab El Oued
14:00		Report		Stadium: Stade La Consolation; Referee: Amar

9 January 1949 Round 9	USM Alger	1–1	US Blida	Bab El Oued
14:00	Hamdi 15'	Report	? 17'	Stadium: Stade La Consolation

16 January 1949 Round 10	Olympique Rouiba	1–2	USM Alger	Rouiba
14:00		Report

23 January 1949 Round 11	ÉS Zéralda	4–0	USM Alger	Zéralda
14:00		Report

30 January 1949 Round 12	USM Alger	2–0	ÉS Cherchell	Bab El Oued
14:00	Djeknoun (?); Nait Kaci (?)	Report		Stadium: Stade La Consolation

13 February 1949 Round 13	USM Alger	0–0	Olympique Marengo	Bab El Oued
14:00		Report		Stadium: Stade La Consolation

27 February 1949 Round 14	Stade Guyotville	2–1	USM Alger	Guyotville
14:00		Report

13 March 1949 Round 15	USM Alger	1–1	AS Montpensier	Bab El Oued
14:00		Report		Stadium: Stade La Consolation

20 March 1949 Round 16	USM Alger	3–0	SC Algérois	Bab El Oued
14:00	Beddaréne (?); Ouaguenouni (?); Djeknoun (?)	Report		Stadium: Stade La Consolation

27 March 1949 Round 17	Olympique Littoral	1–1	USM Alger	Castiglione
14:00		Report

3 April 1949 Round 18	US Blida	0–3	USM Alger	Boufarik
14:00		Report	Djeknoun (?); Nait Kaci (?)

== Forconi Cup ==
In the third round, on October 3, 1948, USMA traveled to Blida to face SC Affreville. The match was tense, with the “Red and Black” taking the lead thanks to a goal from Hassan Chabri. But after only half an hour of play, the atmosphere deteriorated: the protests from the opposing side became uncontrollable. The referee, described by the press as weak and unable to manage the situation, was forced to abandon the match, thus awarding victory to USMA under extraordinary circumstances. The journey, however, ended prematurely. In the fourth round, on October 17, 1948, USM Alger came up against a formidable opponent from the Honor Division: AS Saint Eugène. The Algiers club suffered a heavy 3–0 defeat, which brought its cup run to an end despite a promising start.

19 September 1948 2nd round	USM Alger	2–0	JSM Algérois	Bab El Oued
:				Stadium: Stade La Consolation
Note: Lineup for USM Alger - Zitouni, Mustapha Ouaguenouni, Allel Ouaguenouni, Mohamed Hamdi, Naït Kaci, Azzouz, Chabri, Benhaddad, Ben Guenife, Benzireg, Chaouane.

3 October 1948 3rd round	SC Affreville	*-*	USM Alger	Blida
:
Note: Penalty lost to SC Affreville and award the win to USM Alger.

17 October 1948 4th round	AS Saint Eugène	3–0	USM Alger	Saint Eugène
14:00	de Villeneuve (?); Benet (?)	Report		Stadium: Stade Roger Lapergue
Note: Lineup for USM Alger - Zitouni, Hamdi, Chaouane, Benhaddad, Ouaguenouni, Aidoune, Azzouz, Chabri, Naït Kaci, Bedaréne, Aichoune.

== Squad information ==
=== Playing statistics ===
P.	Player	First Division																		FC		Total
P.	Player	1	2	3	4	5	6	7	8	9	10	11	12	13	14	15	16	17	18	1	2	Total
GK	(France) Hassen Zitouni																					
DF	(France) Allel Ouaguenouni																					
DF	(France) Mustapha Ouaguenouni																					
	(France) Hassan Chabri																					
	(France) Abdelkader Djaknoun																					
	(France) Ahmed Azzouz																					
FW	(France) Rabah Zouaoui																					
FW	(France) Mohamed Hamdi																					
	(France) Zoubir Naït Kaci																					
	(France) Rabah Bedaréne																					
	(France) Abdelkader Chaouane																					
	(France) Ammar Chaouane																					
FW	(France) Krimo Rebih																					
	(France) Ammar Aidoune																					
GK	(France) Omar Lounas																					
	(France) Abdelkader Tchikou																					
DF	(France) Zoubir Bouadjadj																					
	(France) Kamel Benhaddad																					
	(France) Zoubir Ben Guenife																					
	(France) Toufik Chahi																					
	(France) Ibrahim Kellal																					
	(France) Abdelouahib Amoudi																					
	(France) Aissa Ben Kani																					
	(France) Messaoud Ben Adar																					
	(France) Mohamed Benzireg																					

=== Goalscorers ===
Includes all competitive matches. The list is sorted alphabetically by surname when total goals are equal.

Nat.	Player	Pos.	PD	FC	TOTAL
(France)			0	0	0
(France)			0	0	0
(France)			0	0	0
(France)			0	0	0
(France)			0	0	0
(France)			0	0	0
(France)			0	0	0
(France)			0	0	0
Own Goals			0	0	0
Totals			0	0	0
