= 1951–52 USM Alger season =

USM Alger
1951–52 season
- President: Mohamed Zenagui
- Head coach: Hamid Akdiourat
- Stadium: Stade Marcel Cerdan, Algiers
- First Division: 1st
- Forconi Cup: Second Round
- Top goalscorer: League: Rabah Zouaoui (12 goals); All: Rabah Zouaoui (12 goals)

In the 1951–52 season, USM Alger is competing in the Second Division for the 15th season French colonial era, as well as the Forconi Cup. They competing in First Division, and the Forconi Cup.

== Review ==
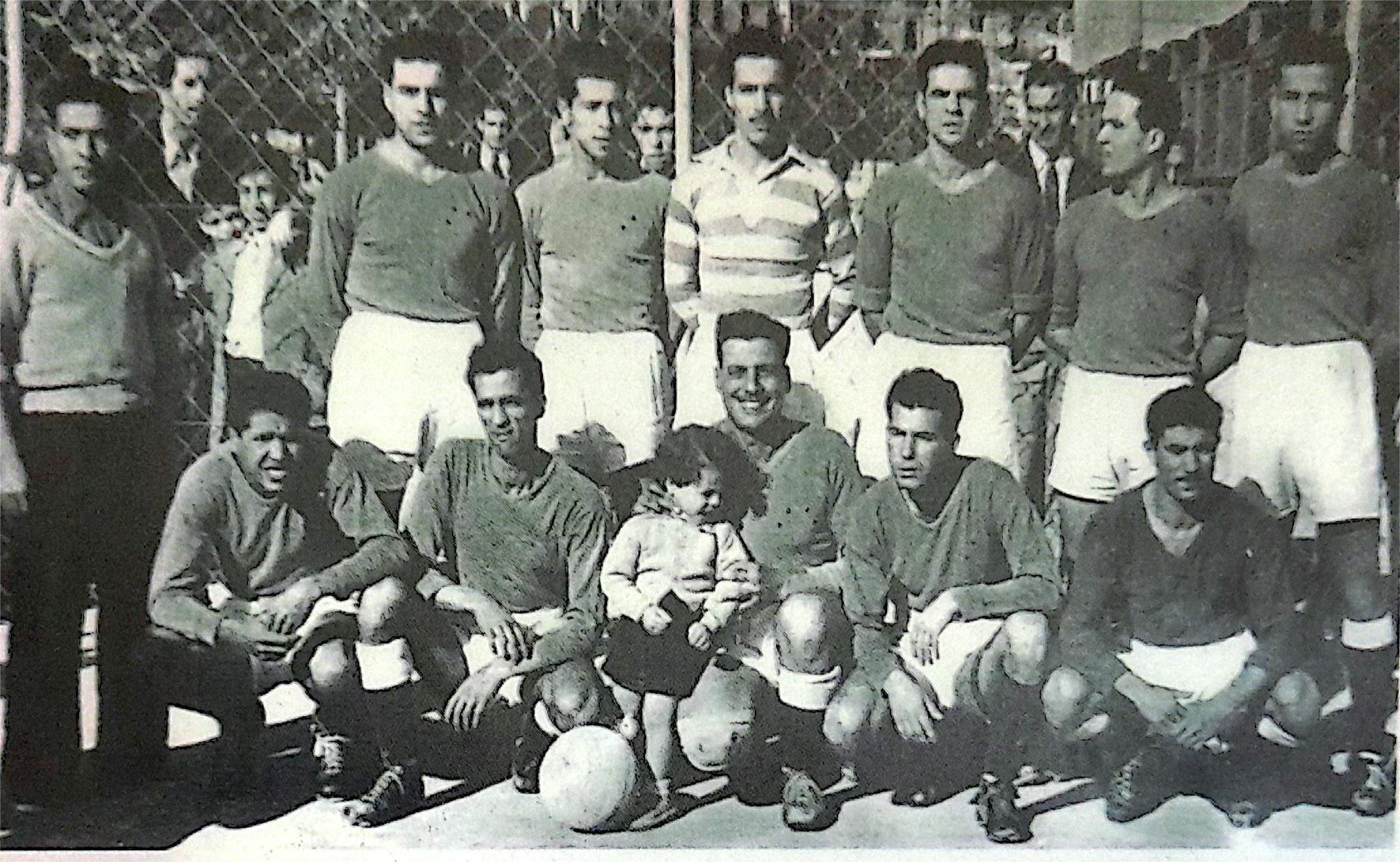
USM Alger 1951–52 with From Right to Left: Stand Up : Hamid Akliouat (coach), Allel Ouaguenouni, Bouhraoua, Benbouha (GK), Bouadjadj, Bedjani, Chabri. Sitting Benhaik, Hamadouche, Zouaoui, Messat, Azzouz.

At the end of the previous sports season, the Union club held its annual general assembly on May 20, 1951. The board of directors met on May 24, in the presence of all members, to evaluate the results of the past season and to take the necessary measures to reorganize the board’s office as well as the various committees. Other meetings were also held on the evening of May 31 and on June 23 to discuss various issues related to preparations for the new sports season. On September 6, 1951, the League published the composition of the three groups of the First Division. USM Alger was placed in Group I, which included the following ten teams: RC Maison Carrée, US Ouest Mitidja, O. Tizi Ouzou, O. Rouïba, US Blida, JS El Biar, RC Kouba, NA Hussein Dey, GS Alger-Hydra, USM Alger.

== Squad list ==
Players and squad numbers last updated on 30 September 1951.
Note: Flags indicate national team as has been defined under FIFA eligibility rules. Players may hold more than one non-FIFA nationality.

Nat.	Position	Name	Date of Birth (Age)	Signed from
(France)	GK	Hassen Zitouni		(France)
(France)	LB	Allel Ouaguenouni		(France)
(France)	LB	Zoubir Bouadjadj	4 October 1925 (aged 25)	(France)
(France)	CB	Mustapha Ouaguenouni	4 November 1924 (aged 26)	(France)
(France)	MF	Abdelkader Zerrar	10 January 1934 (aged 17)	(France)
(France)	ST	Abdelhamid Kermali	24 April 1931 (aged 20)	(France) USM Sétif
(France)	ST	Rabah Zouaoui	19 April 1920 (aged 31)	(France) RS Alger
(France)	ST	Krimo Rebih	1 May 1932 (aged 19)	(France) Youth system
(France)		Hacène Chabri	25 April 1931 (aged 20)	(France)
(France)		Rabah beddarene		(France) MC Alger

== Pre-season and friendlies ==
12 September 1951 Tournoi Féte de l'Aid-el-Kébir	USM Alger	2–0	ASPTT Alger	Algiers
14:30		Report		Stadium: Stade Marcel Cerdan

== Competitions ==
=== Overview ===
Competition	Record								Started round	Final position / round	First match	Last match
Competition	G	W	D	L	GF	GA	GD	Win %	Started round	Final position / round	First match	Last match
First Division	18	14	3	1	51	18	+33	77.78	—N/a	1st	30 September 1951	30 March 1952
Forconi Cup	2	1	0	1	2	2	+0	50.00	First Round	Second Round	9 September 1951	23 September 1951
Total	20	15	3	2	53	20	+33	75.00				

== League table ==
=== Group I ===
Pos	Team	Pld	W	D	L	GF	GA	GD	Pts	Promotion or relegation
1	USM Alger	18	14	3	1	51	18	+33	49	Qualified for the "Tournament of the first" (Note: Champion, qualified for the "Tournament of the first" and fight both the title of First Division Champion and accession in Division Honneur. Also note that the second of this tournament is crowned Vice-champion and also accessed by higher division.)
2	RC Maison Carrée	18	13	3	2	0	0	0	47	Qualified for the "second tournament" (Note: Vice-Champion, qualified for the "second tournament" qualifying the dam third place against the last of the "first of the tournament," is the last place in the Accession Division Honneur. This classification match is honorary because that means the barrage also third in the First Division)
3	US Ouest Mitidja	18	11	3	4	0	0	0	43	
4	RC Kouba	18	10	1	7	0	0	0	39	
5	O. Tizi Ouzou	18	6	3	9	0	0	0	33	
6	GS Alger-Hydra	18	6	2	10	0	0	0	32	
7	NA Hussein Dey	18	5	3	10	0	0	0	31	
8	O. Rouïba	18	4	5	9	0	0	0	31	
9	US Blida	18	5	1	12	0	0	0	29	Relegation zone (Note: Second last, relegation zone, is playing the "Tournament of the ninth" last chance not to go down to the second division, " 2F/A ". The first two of this tournament are saved.)
10	JS El Biar	18	2	4	12	0	0	0	26	Relegation zone (Note: Last, second and last relegation, fight the "tenths of tournament," the winner of this tournament is playing a dam against the last of the "ninth of the tournament," sort of "barrier" not to go down to the second division " 2F/A ")

Notes:
- Results of Playoffs First Division

=== Matches ===
Win Draw Loss

30 September 1951 Round 1	US Ouest Mitidja	2–2	USM Alger	Mouzaïavilie
	Benbouha 35' (o.g.); Achour 85'	Report	Zouaoui (?), 75'	Referee: Bocceciampe
Note: Lineup for USM Alger - Benbouha, Bedjani, Naït Kaci, Allel Ouaguenouni, Mustapha Ouaguenouni, Bouadjadj, Azzouz, Chabri, Zouaoui, Bouhraoua, Krimo.

7 October 1951 Round 2	USM Alger	3–0	GS Alger-Hydra	Algiers
	Azzouz 20'; Zouaoui 47' (?)	Report		Stadium: Stade Marcel Cerdan
Note: Lineup for USM Alger - Benbouha, Allel Ouaguenouni, Mustapha Ouaguenouni, Bouadjadj, Bedjani, Bouhraoua, Chabri, Laid, Amar, Zouaoui, Azzouz.

21 October 1951 Round 3	USM Alger	3–1	O. Tizi Ouzou	Algiers
	Zouaoui 30', 40'; Bouhraoua (?)	Report	Sliti (?)	Stadium: Stade Marcel Cerdan; Referee: Garofalo
Note: Lineup for USM Alger - Benbohra, Bouadjadj, Allel Ouaguenouni, Bedjani, MessaT, Bouhraoua, Naït Kaci, Krimo, Mustapha Ouaguenouni, Azzouz, Zouaoui.

4 November 1951 Round 4	US Blida	1–2	USM Alger	Blida
	Jumin	Report	Zouaoui 10'; Azzouz 75'	Stadium: USB Stadium; Referee: Diméglio
Note: Lineup for USM Alger - Benbouha, Krimo, Bouhraoua, Chabri, Bedjani, Ouaguenoune, Bouadjadj, Meffat, Azzouz, Naït Kaci, Zouaoui.

11 November 1951 Round 5	USM Alger	4–0	JS El Biar	Algiers
	Ahmed Azzouz 40', 63', 66'; Krimo 41'	Report		Stadium: Stade Marcel Cerdan; Referee: Cheltiel
Note: Lineup for USM Alger - Benbouha, Bouadjadj, Ouaguenouni, Bedjani, MessaT, Bouhraoua, Zouaoui, Naït Kaci, Azzouz, Krimo, Chabri.

9 December 1951 Round 6	NA Hussein Dey	0–5	USM Alger	Hussein Dey
		Report	Ahmed Azzouz 52'; Zouaoui 65', 70', 82'; Krimo 75'	Referee: Graziani
Note: Lineup for USM Alger - Benbouha, Ouaguenouni, Bedjani, Rabah Bouhraoua, Hamadouchi, Azzouz, Zouaoui, Naït Kaci, Krimo, Bouadjadj, Bedaréne.

2 December 1951 Round 7	USM Alger	1–1	RC Maison Carrée	Algiers
	Zouaoui 89'	Report	Hamadi 80'	Stadium: Stade Marcel Cerdan; Attendance: 1.500; Referee: Attanasio
Note: Lineup for USM Alger - Benbouha, Bouadjadj, Messat, Ouaguenouni, Bedjani, Chabri, Hamadouchi, Bouhraoua, Zouaoui, Benhaik, Azzouz.

16 December 1951 Round 8	O. Rouïba	1–2	USM Alger	Rouïba
	Pons 64'	Report	Naït Kaci 14'; Rabah Zouaoui (?)	Referee: Khenifi
Note: Lineup for USM Alger - Benbouha, Hamadouche, Bouadjadj, Azzouz, Zouaoui, Naït Kaci, Tedjani, Krimo, Bouhraoua, Benhaik, Ouaguenouni.

23 December 1951 Round 9	RC Kouba	0–3	USM Alger	Kouba
		Report	Zouaoui (?); Naït Kaci (?); Benhaik (?)
Note: Lineup for USM Alger - , , , , , , , , , , .

6 January 1952 Round 10	USM Alger	3–3	US Ouest Mitidja	Algiers
	Defnet 2' (o.g.); Rabah Zouaoui 42', 84'	Report	Demder 25'; Achour 64'; Boufouras 65'	Stadium: Stade Marcel Cerdan; Referee: Mazzochi
Note: Lineup for USM Alger - Benbouha, Bouadjadj, Ouaguenouni, Benhaik, Tedjani, Bouhraoua, Azzouz, Naït Kaci, Zouaoui, Chabri, Krimo.

13 January 1952 Round 11	GS Alger-Hydra	1–3	USM Alger	Hydra
	Rancurez 20'	Report	Krimo 13'; Hacène Chabri 60'; Allel Ouaguenouni 62'
Note: Lineup for USM Alger - , , , , , , , , , , .

27 January 1952 Round 12	O. Tizi Ouzou	1–2	USM Alger	Tizi Ouzou
	Haouchine 15'	Report	Azzouz 40'; Zouaoui 75'	Referee: Fourrié
Note: Lineup for USM Alger - Zitouni, Bouadjadj, Ouaguenouni, Hamel, Benhaik, Bedjani, Chabri, Azzouz, Zouaoui, Naït Kaci, Krimo.

3 February 1952 Round 13	USM Alger	4–0	US Blida	Algiers
	Zouaoui (?); Krimo (?); Hamel (?); Chabri (?)	Report		Stadium: Stade Marcel Cerdan; Referee: Carratero
Note: Lineup for USM Alger - , , , , , , , , , , .

10 February 1952 Round 14	JS El Biar	0–2	USM Alger	El Biar
		Report	Krimo 2'; Zouaoui 25'	Referee: Kaddouche
Note: Lineup for USM Alger - Zitouni, Bouadjadj, Mustapha Ouaguenouni, Allel Ouaguenouni, Chabri, Bedjani, Krimo, Bouhraoua, Zouaoui, Naït Kaci, Azzouz.

24 February 1952 Round 15	USM Alger	3–2	NA Hussein Dey	Algiers
	Tedjani 44'; Bouhraoua 50'; Saudi 70' (o.g.)	Report	Bensaci 15', 41'	Stadium: Stade Marcel Cerdan
Note: Lineup for USM Alger - Zitouni, Bouadjadj, Allel Ouaguenouni, Mustapha Ouaguenouni, Chabri, Naït Kaci, Azzouz, Bouhraoua, Bedjani, Krimo, Zouaoui.

2 March 1952 Round 16	RC Maison Carrée	2–1	USM Alger	Maison-Carrée
	Marmu 20'; Ségui 25'	Report	Azzouz 10'	Stadium: Stade Lavigerie; Attendance: 2,000; Referee: Janvier Attanasio
Note: Lineup for USM Alger - Zitouni, Bouadjadj, Allel Ouaguenouni, Mustapha Ouaguenouni, Bedjani, Bedaréne, Krimo, Azzouz, Zouaoui, Chabri, Bouhraoua.

16 March 1952 Round 17	USM Alger	3–1	O. Rouïba	Algiers
	Azzouz 17'; Messat (?); Chabri (?)	Report	Rouesnel (?)	Stadium: Stade Marcel Cerdan
Note: Lineup for USM Alger - Zitouni, Hamadouchi, Bouadjadj, Ouaguenouni, Bedjani, Chabri, Messat, Bouhraoua, Benhaik, Naït Kaci, Azzouz.

30 March 1952 Round 18	USM Alger	5–2	RC Kouba	Algiers
	Bouhraoua (?); Krimo (?); Hamadouche (?); Azzouz (?)	Report	Bensemane (?); Khaouas (?)	Stadium: Stade Marcel Cerdan
Note: Lineup for USM Alger - Benbohra, Bouadjadj, Benhaik, Allel Ouaguenouni, Bedjani, Chabri, Krimo, Bouhraoua, Hamadouchi, Naït Kaci, Azzouz.

=== Playoffs ===
20 April 1952 Playoffs	USM Alger	2–3	SCU El Biar	Kouba
	Chabri 70'; Krimo 79'	Report	Vidal.H 3'; Galéra 27'; Faizon 40'	Referee: Rivéccio
Note: Lineup for USM Alger - Zitouni, Bouadjadj, Benaïf, Allel Ouaguenouni, Bedjani, Messat, Krimo, Chabri, Zouaoui, Hamadouchi, Naït Kaci - Coach Hamid Akdiourat.

27 April 1952 Playoffs	USM Alger	0–3	O. Marengo	Blida
		Report	Papillon; Bessone	Stadium: FCB Stadium; Referee: Attanasio
Note: Lineup for USM Alger - Benboha, Bouadjadj, Benhaik, Hamadouche, Bedjani, Messat, Naït Kaci, Bouhraoua, Zouaoui, Krimo, Azzouz - Coach Hamid Akdiourat.

== Forconi Cup ==
9 September 1951 First Round	USM Alger	2–0	CS Algérois	Algiers
	Bedjani; Messat	Report		Stadium: Stade Marcel Cerdan
Note: Lineup for USM Alger - Benbouha, Allel Ouaguenouni, Mustapha Ouaguenouni, Zaabi, Naït Kaci, Hamadouchi, Krimo Rebih, Nessat, Bedjani, Zouaoui, Bouadjadj.

23 September 1951 Second Round	ES Zéralda	2–0	USM Alger	Guyotville
	Simo; Loffrédo	Report
Note: Lineup for USM Alger - Zitouni, Bouadjadj, Allel Ouaguenouni, Mustapha Ouaguenouni, Chérif, Messat, Azzouz, Naït Kaci, Hamadouchi, Bedjani, Krimo.

== Squad information ==
=== Playing statistics ===
In rounds 4, 5, 6, 7, 8, 10 and 17, it is not known who was the player who participated, Allel or Mustapha Ouaguenouni.

P.	Player	First Division																		PO		FC		Total
P.	Player	1	2	3	4	5	6	7	8	9	10	11	12	13	14	15	16	17	18	1	2	1	2	Total
GK	(France) Hassen Zitouni														X	X	X	X		X			X	6
GK	(France) Benbouha	X	X	X	X	X	X	X	X		X								X		X	X		12
LB	(France) Allel Ouaguenouni	X	X	X											X	X	X		X	X		X	X	10
CB	(France) Mustapha Ouaguenouni	X	X	X											X	X	X					X	X	8
LB	(France) Zoubir Bouadjadj	X	X	X	X	X	X	X	X		X				X	X	X	X	X	X	X	X	X	18
RB	(France) Hacène Chabri	X	X		X	X		X			X				X	X	X	X	X	X				11
RB	(France) Dahmane Hamadouche						X	X	X									X	X	X	X	X	X	9
FW	(France) Rabah Zouaoui	X	X	X	X	X	X	X	X		X				X	X	X			X	X	X		15
FW	(France) Krimo Rebih	X		X	X	X	X		X		X				X	X	X		X	X	X	X	X	15
FW	(France) Ahmed Azzouz	X	X	X	X	X	X	X	X		X				X	X	X	X	X		X		X	16
	(France) Zoubir Naït Kaci	X		X	X	X	X		X		X				X	X		X	X	X	X	X	X	15
	(France) Boualem Bedjani	X	X	X	X	X	X	X	X		X				X	X	X	X	X	X	X	X	X	18
	(France) Rabah Bouhraoua	X	X	X	X	X	X	X	X		X				X	X	X	X	X		X			15
	(France) Mohamed Messat			X		X		X										X		X	X	X	X	8
	(France) Rabah Bedaréne						X										X							2
	(France) Boualem Benhaik							X	X		X							X	X		X			6
	(France) Mohamed Zaai																					X		1
	(France) Mokhtar Laid		X																					1
	(France) Amar		X																					1
	(France) Meffat				X																			1
	(France) Chérif																						X	1
	(France) Benaïf																			X				1

=== Goalscorers ===
Includes all competitive matches. The list is sorted alphabetically by surname when total goals are equal.

Nat.	Player	Pos.	PD	PO	FC	TOTAL
(France)	Rabah Zouaoui	FW	15	0	0	15
(France)	Ahmed Azzouz	FW	9	0	0	9
(France)	Krimo Rebih	FW	6	1	0	7
(France)	Rabah Bouhraoua	?	3	0	0	3
(France)	Boualem Bedjani	?	1	0	1	2
(France)	Hacène Chabri	RB	1	1	0	2
(France)	Mohamed Messat	?	1	0	1	2
(France)	Zoubir Naït Kaci	?	1	0	0	1
(France)	Dahmane Hamadouchi	RB	1	0	0	1
(France)	Amar	?	1	0	0	1
Own Goals			2	0	0	2
Totals			41	2	2	45
