= 1954–55 USM Alger season =

USM Alger
1954–55 season
- President: Ali Chérifi
- Stadium: Stade Marcel Cerdan
- First Division: 10th
- Forconi Cup: Third round
- Top goalscorer: League: Hamid Chibane (5 goals); All: Hamid Chibane (5 goals)

In the 1954–55 season, USM Alger competed in the First Division for the 18th season French colonial era, as well as the Forconi Cup. They competed in First Division, and the Forconi Cup.

== Review ==
1954–55 League Algiers First Division Group III Standings

After the end of the 1953–54 season with very modest, if not outright poor, results, USM Alger failed to secure promotion to the newly established Honor Promotion Division at the level of the Algiers League. As a result, the club remained in the First Division for another season. In this context, the club's board of directors held a regular meeting on June 10, 1954, at the team's headquarters, attended by all members. Several key issues were discussed, including: Releasing a number of players from various levels. Recruiting new players to strengthen the squad and implementing decisions previously made by the league at the start of the past season. Discussing the conditions for continuing competition in the upcoming season, in light of the escalating political tensions in the country with the Algerian Revolution looming on the horizon.

The season ended with USM Alger relegated to the second division, after a very poor campaign due to the ongoing revolution, the beginning of a mass exodus of the club's best players, and other reasons known only to the club's management. A review of the team's season shows that it occupied last place almost throughout the year. They lost several matches at home and drew many others. Away from home, the results were very poor despite a generally acceptable level of play. It is also noticeable that the team used a heavily rotated squad throughout the season, changing lineups from one match to the next. The club management failed to establish a consistent starting eleven by the end of the season. The team also suffered from a weak defensive line and poor coordination between its different departments.

== Squad list ==
USM Alger squad list.
1 Maâmar Azef	2 Abdelkader Berbachi	3 Mohamed Hassaine	4 Mustapha Ouaguenouni	5 Allel Ouaguenouni
6 Zoubir Naït Kaci	7 Saadi Yacef	8 Abdelkader Tchicou	9 Abdelkader Belkaraoui	10 Hamid Chibane
11 Boualem Mekkiri	12 Moustapha Kouirat	13 Ramadan Achir	14 Mohamed Abderezak	15 Mohamed Hamdi
16 Rachid Hammoudi	17 Zoubir Bouadjadj	18 Mohamed Kherouni	19 Abdelkader Kessar	20 Slimane Ghalem
21 Abdelkader Chemlal	22 Ahmed Halimi	23 Abderrahmane Haddad	24 Benaïssa Azef	25 M'Hamed Ben Ali
26 Boualem Rekkal	27 Omar Zenagui	28 Omar Ferrad	29	30

== Competitions ==
=== Overview ===
Competition	Record								Started round	Final position / round	First match	Last match
Competition	G	W	D	L	GF	GA	GD	Win %	Started round	Final position / round	First match	Last match
First Division	18	2	3	13	13	39	−26	11.11	—N/a	10th	26 September 1954	17 April 1955
Playoffs	2	0	0	2	0	6	−6	0.00	1 round	3rd		15 May 1955
Forconi Cup	2	1	0	1	5	4	+1	50.00	First round	Third round	11 September 1954	18 September 1954
Total	22	3	3	16	18	49	−31	13.64				

== League table ==
=== Group III ===
==== Results by round ====
Round	1	2	3	4	5	6	7	8	9	10	11	12	13	14	15	16	17	18
Ground	A	H	A	H	A	H	H	A	H	H	A	H	A	H	A	A	H	A
Result	W	L	D	D	L	L	L	L	L	D	L	L	L	L	W	L	L	L
Position		8	3	4	6	8	10	10	10	10	10	10	10	10	10	10	10	10

Updated to match(es) played on 21 June 2025. Source: Competitive matches
A = Away; H = Home; W = Win; D = Draw; L = Loss

=== Matches ===
Win Draw Loss

26 September 1954 Round 1	US Aumale	0–1	USM Alger	Aïn Bessem
			Dubouch 10' (o.g.)
Note: Lineup for USM Alger - , , , , , , , , , , .

10 October 1954 Round 2	USM Alger	0–1	SC Alger	Algiers
		Report	Del Vecchio 75'	Stadium: Stade Marcel Cerdan
Note: Lineup for USM Alger - Maâmar Azef, Kouirat, Ouaguenouni, Larbi, Yacef, Mekkiri, Abderezak, Chibane, Belkaraoui, Kherouni, Ghanem.

24 October 1954 Round 3	WA Rivet	2–2	USM Alger	Rivet
	? 70'; ? (?)	Report	Hamid Chibane 20', 55'	Stadium: Stade de Rivet
Note: Lineup for USM Alger - , , , , , , , , , , .

31 October 1954 Round 4	USM Alger	1–1	US Fort-de-l’Eau	Algiers
	Yacef 55' (pen.)	Report	Grammatico 35'	Stadium: Stade Marcel Cerdan; Referee: M. Chiraux
Note: Lineup for USM Alger - Maâmar Azef, Kouirat, Allel Ouaguenouni, Belkaraoui, Naït Kaci, Larbi, Yacef, Ghanem, Kherouni, Chibane, Abderezak.

14 November 1954 Round 5	RC Kouba	2–0	USM Alger	Kouba
	? 43'; Mustapha 84'	Report		Stadium: Stade de Kouba
Note: Lineup for USM Alger - Maâmar Azef, Larbi, Allel Ouaguenouni, Kessar, Naït Kaci, Mekkiri, Yacef, Belkaraoui, Ghanem, Kabli, Ferad.

28 November 1954 Round 6	USM Alger	3–4	AST Alger	Algiers
	Slimane Ghanem 3'; Hamid Chibane 58', 81'	Report	? 44'; ? 63'; ? 73'; ? 80'	Stadium: Stade Marcel Cerdan
Note: Lineup for USM Alger - , , , , , , , , , , .

12 December 1954 Round 7	USM Alger	1–2	Olympique de Rouiba	Algiers
	Hamid Chibane 48'	Report	? 25'; Periano 89'	Stadium: Stade Marcel Cerdan; Referee: Jouve
Note: Lineup for USM Alger - Maâmar Azef, M'Hamed Rouan, Kessar, Hammoudi, Atlani, Ferrad, Chechoui, Mekkiri, Chibane, Zenagui, Rekkal.

19 December 1954 Round 8	ASM Barre	3–1	USM Alger	Maison Carrée
		Report	Omar Zenagui (?)	Stadium: Stade Zévaco
Note: Lineup for USM Alger - Hassaine, M'Hamed Rouan, Larbi, Ferrad, Kessar, Rekkal, Kherouni, Zenagui, Mekkiri, Belkaraoui, Halimi.

26 December 1954 Round 9	USM Alger	0–3	USM Maison Carrée	Algiers
		Report	Zeghmoune 10'; Hamza 25'; Mokrane 44'	Stadium: Stade Marcel Cerdan; Referee: Vals
Note: Lineup for USM Alger - Hassaine, Larbi, M'Hamed Rouan, Achir, Kessar, Zenagui, Mekkiri, Abderezak, Naït Kaci, Halimi, Ferrad.

9 January 1955 Round 10	USM Alger	0–0	US Aumale	Algiers
		Report		Stadium: Stade Marcel Cerdan; Referee: Cheltiel
Note: Lineup for USM Alger - Maâmar Azef, Larbi, Ouaguenouni, Naït Kaci, Mekkiri, Chibane, Belkaraoui, Ramadan Achir, Ghanem, Yacef, Rekkal.

16 January 1955 Round 11	SC Alger	1–0	USM Alger	Algiers
		Report		Stadium: Stade Marcel Cerdan
Note: Lineup for USM Alger - Maâmar Azef, Larbi, Rekkal, Kouirat, Allel Ouaguenouni, Naït Kaci, Ramadan Achir, Yacef, Ghanem, Abderezak, Belkaraoui.

23 January 1955 Round 12	USM Alger	2–4	WA Revet	Algiers
	Omar Zenagui (?); Ferrad (?)	Report		Stadium: Stade Marcel Cerdan
Note: Lineup for USM Alger - Maâmar Azef, Kouirat, Rekkal, Mekkiri, Allel Ouaguenouni, Larbi, Ferrad, Yacef, Zenagui, Naït Kaci, Rouane.

6 February 1955 Round 13	US Fort-de-l’Eau	3–0	USM Alger	Fort-de-l’Eau
	? 30'; ? 59'; ? 83'	Report		Stadium: Stade de Fort-de-l’Eau
Note: Lineup for USM Alger - Berbachi, Rouane, Belkaraoui, Kouirat, Mekkiri, Ouaguenouni, Zenagui, Chemlal, Larbi, Ramadan Achir, Kerroumi.

20 February 1955 Round 14	USM Alger	0–3	RC Kouba	Algiers
		Report		Stadium: Stade Marcel Cerdan
Note: Lineup for USM Alger - Berbachi, Mustapha Ouaguenouni, Allel Ouaguenouni, Chibane, Rouane, Ferrad, Mekkiri, Zenagui, Belkaraoui, Larbi, Kherouni.

6 March 1955 Round 15	AST Alger	1–2	USM Alger	Bir Mourad Raïs
	? (?)	Report	Mohamed Larbi 15'; Zoubir Naït Kaci (?)	Stadium: Stade de Bir Mourad Raïs
Note: Lineup for USM Alger - , , , , , , , , , , .

20 March 1955 Round 16	Olympique de Rouiba	3–0	USM Alger	Rouiba
	Selmi 2', 4', 41'	Report		Stadium: Stade de Rouiba; Referee: Attanasio
Note: Lineup for USM Alger - Berbachi, Rouane, Ouaguenouni, Kouirat, Belkaraoui, Rekkal, Mekkiri, Hamdi, Larbi, Naït Kaci, Zenagui.

3 April 1955 Round 17	USM Alger	0–3	ASM Barre	Algiers
		Report	Vitiello 5', 75'; ? (?)	Stadium: Stade Marcel Cerdan; Referee: Meetre
Note: Lineup for USM Alger - Maâmar Azef, Ouaguenouni, M'hamed Rouane, Ramadan Achir, Ghanem, Naït Kaci, Mekkiri, Ferrad, Kherouni, Tchicou, Bedaréne.

17 April 1955 Round 18	USM Maison Carrée	3–0	USM Alger	Maison Carrée
	Fodil 57'; Mokrane 61'; Maâmar Azef 75' (o.g.)	Report		Stadium: Stade Lavigerie; Referee: Caffier
Note: Lineup for USM Alger - , , , , , , , , , , .

==== Playoffs ====
Under the competition format, the team finishing in last place in the overall standings qualified for the relegation play-offs, where it faced the teams finishing last in Group I and Group II. These play-off matches determined which clubs would retain their place in the First Division for the following season.

Round 1	USM Alger	0–4	SC Miliana
		Report
Note: Lineup for USM Alger - Maâmar Azef, Ouaguenouni, Kouirat, Rekkal, Mekkiri, Belkaraoui, Naït Kaci, Tchico, Halimi, Ghanem, Hamdi.

15 May 1955 Round 2	USM Alger	0–2	AS Rivet	Rouiba
		Report	? 13'; ? 74'	Stadium: Stade de Rouiba
Note: Lineup for USM Alger - Maâmar Azef, Kouirat, Larbi, Achir, Ghanem, Naït Kaci, Ferrad, Belkaraoui, Mekkiri, Rekkal, Derbouche.

=== Forconi Cup ===
First round	ES Rouina	w/o	USM Alger
		Report
Note: ES Rouina’s withdrawal from the first round of the Forconi Cup, USM Alger’s win by walkover.

11 September 1954 Second round	JSM Chéraga	2–5	USM Alger	Hydra
		Report	Slimane Ghanem 10'; M'Hamed Ben Ali (?); Ramadan Achir (?); Mohamed Larbi (?)	Stadium: Stade de Hydra
Note: Lineup for USM Alger - Maâmar Azef, Kessar, Ramadan Achir, Ghanem, Mekkiri, Kouirat, Larbi, Hamdi, M'Hamed Ben Ali, Belkaraoui, Kherouni.

18 September 1954 Third round	OM Saint-Eugène	2–0	USM Alger	Saint Eugène
	Maâmar Azef 14' (o.g.); El Mehdaoui 57'	Report		Stadium: Stade Communal de Saint Eugène
Note: Lineup for USM Alger - Maâmar Azef, Kessar, Ghanem, M'Hamed Ben Ali, Mekkiri, Ramadan Achir, Kouirat, Ouaguenouni, Naït Kaci, Belkaraoui, Yacef.

== Squad information ==
=== Playing statistics ===
In rounds 2, 10, 13, 17, playoffs round 1, and third round of Forconi Cup, it is not known who was the player who participated, Allel or Mustapha Ouaguenouni.

Pos.	Player	First Division																		PO		FC		Total
Pos.	Player	1	2	3	4	5	6	7	8	9	10	11	12	13	14	15	16	17	18	1	2	1	2	Total
GK	(France) Maâmar Azef		X		X	X		X	S		X	X	X					X		X	X	X	X	12
GK	(France) Abdelkader Berbachi								S					X	X		X							3
GK	(France) Mohamed Hassaine								X	X														2
CB	(France) Mustapha Ouaguenouni														X		X							2
LB	(France) Allel Ouaguenouni				X	X						X	X		X	S	S							5
LB	(France) Zoubir Bouadjadj																							0
	(France) Abdelkader Belkaraoui		X		X	X			X		X	X		X	X		X			X	X	X	X	13
	(France) Boualem Mekkiri		X			X		X	X	X	X		X	X	X		X	X		X	X	X	X	15
	(France) Moustapha Kouirat		X		X							X	X	X			X			X	X	X	X	10
	(France) Slimane Ghanem		X		X	X					X	X						X		X	X	X	X	10
	(France) Mohamed Larbi		X		X	X			X	X	X	X	X	X	X		X				X	X		13
	(France) Omar Zenagui							X	X	X			X	X	X		X							7
	(France) Omar Ferrad					X		X	X	X			X		X			X			X			8
	(France) M'Hamed Rouane							X	X	X			X	X	X		X	X						8
	(France) Zoubir Naït Kaci				X	X				X	X	X	X				X	X		X	X		X	11
FW	(France) Saadi Yacef		X		X	X					X	X	X										X	7
	(France) Hamid Chibane		X		X			X			X				X									5
	(France) Mohamed Abderezak		X		X					X		X												4
	(France) Ramadan Achir									X	X	X		X				X			X	X	X	8
	(France) Boualem Rekkal							X	X		X	X	X	S	S		X			X	X			8
	(France) Abdelkader Kessar					X		X	X	X												X	X	6
	(France) Abderrahmane Haddad																							0
	(France) Abdelkader Tchicou																	X		X				2
	(France) Mohamed Hamdi																X			X		X		3
	(France) M'Hamed Ben Ali																					X	X	2
	(France) Mohamed Kherouni		X		X				X						X			X				X		6
	(France) Ahmed Halimi								X	X										X				3
	(France) Rachid Hammoudi							X																1
	(France) Abdelkader Chemlal													X										1
	(France) Abdelkader Kabli					X																		1
	(France) Ali Kerroumi													X										1
	(France) Chechoui							X																1
	(France) Atlani							X																1
	(France) Rabah Bedaréne																	X						1
	(France) Mokrane Derbouche																				X			1
	(France) Benaïssa Azef																							0

=== Goalscorers ===
Includes all competitive matches. The list is sorted alphabetically by surname when total goals are equal.

Nat.	Player	PD	FC	TOTAL
(France)	Hamid Chibane	5	0	5
(France)	Mohamed Larbi	1	2	3
(France)	Omar Zenagui	2	0	2
(France)	Slimane Ghanem	0	1	1
(France)	M'Hamed Ben Ali	0	1	1
(France)	Ramadan Achir	0	1	1
(France)	Saadi Yacef	1	0	1
(France)	Slimane Ghanem	1	0	1
(France)	Omar Ferrad	1	0	1
(France)	Zoubir Naït Kaci	1	0	1
Own Goals		1	0	1
Totals		13	5	18

=== Clean sheets ===
Includes all competitive matches.

				Clean sheets			
Nat	Name	GP	GA	PD	PO	FC	Total
(France)	Maâmar Azef	16	24	1	0	0	1
(France)	Abdelkader Berbachi	3	9	0	0	0	0
(France)	Mohamed Hassaine	2	6	0	0	0	0
	TOTALS		37	1	0	0	1
