= 1949–50 USM Alger season =

USM Alger
1949–50 season
- Schedule for the 1949–50 season of the First Division Group A
- President: Mohamed Zennagui
- Head coach: El Kamal Mostefa
- Stadium: Marcel Cerdan Stadium
- First Division: 5th
- Forconi Cup: Round of 16
- Top goalscorer: League: Rabah Zouaoui (12 goals); All: Rabah Zouaoui (15 goals)

In the 1949–50 season, USM Alger is competing in the First Division for the 13th season French colonial era, as well as the Forconi Cup. They competing in First Division, and the Forconi Cup.

== Review ==
Following an average season on several fronts, USM Alger began preparing for its return to first division competition, launching efforts early on both administrative and sporting levels. In this context, the club held its general assembly on July 15, 1949, at the official headquarters, during which the latest developments in organizational and sporting matters were discussed. Following this meeting, the club's officials submitted the registration applications for participation in the First Division Championship and the Algiers League Cup, after the official authorizations were issued on July 14.

Regarding the squad, the club opened the period for signing and renewing player licenses starting on August 1. On August 13, a presentation meeting was held to introduce both new and returning players to coach El Kamal Mostefa. Physical and technical training officially began the following day, August 14, marking the start of preparations for the upcoming season. The management of USM Alger decided to host its official matches this season at the La consoltation Stadium, which would later be renamed Marcel Cerdan Stadium. This decision was part of the club’s organizational preparations for the start of the new season.

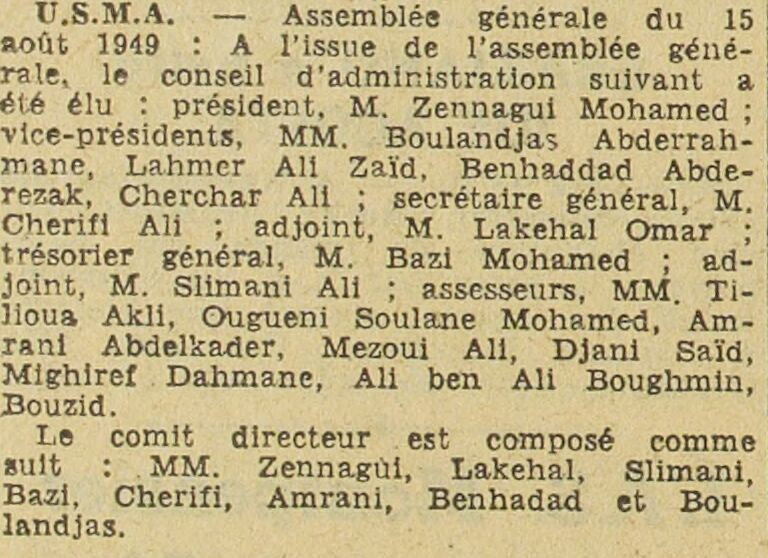
General meeting of USM Alger, August 15, 1949 in L'Écho d'Alger.

General meeting of August 15, 1949 : At the end of the general meeting, the following board of directors was elected :

- President, Mr. Mohamed Zennagui
  - Vice-presidents, MM. Abderrahmane Boulanjas, Ali Zaïd Lahmer, Abderezak Benhaddad, Ali Cherchar
  - Secretary General, Mr. Ali Cherifi
  - Deputy, Mr. Omar Lakehal
  - General Treasurer, Mr. Mohamed Bazi
  - Deputy, Mr. Ali Slimani
  - Assessors, MM. Akli Tilioua, Mohamed Ougueni Soulane, Abdelkader Amrani, Ali Mezoui, Saïd Djani, Dahmane Mighiref, Ali Ben Ali Boughmin, Bouzid
- The steering committee is composed as follows: MM. Zennagui, Lakehal, Slimani, Bazi, Cherifi, Amrani, Benhaddad and Boulanjas.

== Competitions ==
=== Overview ===
Competition	Record								Started round	Final position / round	First match	Last match
Competition	G	W	D	L	GF	GA	GD	Win %	Started round	Final position / round	First match	Last match
First Division	18	7	6	5	28	25	+3	38.89	—N/a	5th	24 September 1949	15 April 1950
Forconi Cup	5	4	0	1	17	10	+7	80.00	First Round	Round of 16	11 September 1949	3 December 1949
Total	23	11	6	6	45	35	+10	47.83				

== League table ==
=== Group A ===
Pos	Team	Pld	W	D	L	F	A	GD	Pts	Notes
1	US Fort-de-l'eau	18	0	0	0	0	0	0	46	
2	O. Tizi Ouzou	18	0	0	0	0	0	0	44	
3	OM Saint Eugène	18	0	0	0	0	0	0	41	
4	AS Kouba	18	0	0	0	0	0	0	39	
5	USM Alger	18	7	6	5	28	25	+3	38	
6	SCU El Biar	18	0	0	0	0	0	0	33	
7	JS Birtouta	18	0	0	0	0	0	0	32	
8	Olympique Rouiba	18	0	0	0	0	0	0	32	
8	AS Rivet	18	0	0	0	0	0	0	29	
10	AS Douéra	18	0	0	0	0	0	0	26	

=== Results by round ===
Round	1	2	3	4	5	6	7	8	9	10	11	12	13	14	15	16	17	18
Ground	A	A	H	H	A	A	H	H	H	H	H	A	A	H	H	A	A	A
Result	L	D	W	W	D	L	W	L	D	W	D	D	W	W	W	D	L	L
Position		5	4	2	2	6	5	5	5	5	5	5	5	3	3	3	5	5

Updated to match(es) played on 14 May 1950. Source: Competitive matches
A = Away; H = Home; W = Win; D = Draw; L = Loss

=== Matches ===
Win Draw Loss

25 September 1949 Round 1	Olympique Rouiba	3–2	USM Alger	Rouiba
	Allés; Pouesnel; Fédélich 87'	Report	Zouaoui
Note: Lineup for USM Alger - , , , , , , , , , , .

9 October 1949 Round 2	O. Tizi Ouzou	1–1	USM Alger	Menerville
	Bouzar Omar	Report	Ammar Aidoune
Note: Lineup for USM Alger - , , , , , , , , , , .

16 October 1949 Round 3	USM Alger	3–2	OM Saint Eugène	Bab El Oued
	Zouaoui; Beddaréne	Report	El Madaoui	Stadium: La consoltation Stadium
Note: Lineup for USM Alger - , , , , , , , , , , .

23 October 1949 Round 4	USM Alger	4–1	AS Douéra	Bab El Oued
	Zouaoui; Azzouz	Report	Roussel	Stadium: La consoltation Stadium
Note: Lineup for USM Alger - Zitouni, Allel Ouaguenouni, Bouadjadj, Bisco, Mustapha Ouaguenouni, Chabri, Ben Mihoubi, Ammar Aidoune, Zouaoui, Hamdaoui, Azzouz.

13 November 1949 Round 5	AS Rivet	0–0	USM Alger	Rivet
		Report		Stadium: Stade de Rivet
Note: Lineup for USM Alger - Zitouni, Allel Ouaguenouni, Bouadjadj, Bisco, Mustapha Ouaguenouni, Chabri, Benhaddad, Messat, Hamdi, Hamdaoui, Azzouz.

20 November 1949 Round 6	US Fort-de-l'eau	4–1	USM Alger	Fort-de-l'Eau
	Nozier; Navarro; Sintès	Report	Hamdi	Stadium: Stade de Fort-de-l'Eau
Note: Lineup for USM Alger - Zitouni, Bouadjadj, Mustapha Ouaguenouni, Benhaddad, Bisco, Hamdaoui, Beddaréne, Hamdi, Chabri, Ben Mihoubi, Azzouz.

11 December 1949 Round 7	USM Alger	2–1	JS Birtouta	Bab El Oued
	Chabri; Allel Ouaguenouni	Report	Antoine	Stadium: Marcel Cerdan Stadium
Note: Lineup for USM Alger - , , , , , , , , , , .

18 December 1949 Round 8	USM Alger	0–3	AS Kouba	Bab El Oued
		Report	Mélia; Martinache Alfred	Stadium: Marcel Cerdan Stadium
Note: Lineup for USM Alger - , , , , , , , , , , .

8 January 1950 Round 9	USM Alger	2–2	SCU El Biar	Bab El Oued
	Nait Kaci; Chabri	Report	Boccechiampe (?) 89'	Stadium: Marcel Cerdan Stadium
Note: Lineup for USM Alger - , , , , , , , , , , .

22 January 1950 Round 10	USM Alger	3–1	Olympique Rouiba	Bab El Oued
	Rabah Beddaréne; Hacène Chabri	Report	Allès	Stadium: Marcel Cerdan Stadium
Note: Lineup for USM Alger - , , , , , , , , , , .

29 January 1950 Round 11	USM Alger	1–1	O. Tizi Ouzou	Bab El Oued
	Zoubir Naït Kaci 44'	Report	?	Stadium: Marcel Cerdan Stadium
Note: Lineup for USM Alger - , , , , , , , , , , .

5 February 1950 Round 12	OM Saint Eugène	2–2	USM Alger	Saint Eugène
	El Kamal	Report	Zouaoui	Stadium: Saint Eugène
Note: Lineup for USM Alger - , , , , , , , , , , .

12 February 1950 Round 13	AS Douéra	0–1	USM Alger	Douéra
		Report	Zouaoui	Stadium: Stade de Douéra
Note: Lineup for USM Alger - , , , , , , , , , , .

26 February 1950 Round 14	USM Alger	3–0	AS Rivet	Bab El Oued
	Ouaguenouni; Rabah Beddaréne; Rabah Zouaoui	Report		Stadium: Marcel Cerdan Stadium
Note: Lineup for USM Alger - , , , , , , , , , , .

5 March 1950 Round 15	USM Alger	1–0	US Fort-de-l'eau	Bab El Oued
	Zoubir Naït Kaci 83'	Report		Stadium: Marcel Cerdan Stadium
Note: Lineup for USM Alger - Zitouni, Bouadjadj, Allel Ouaguenouni, Mustapha Ouaguenouni, Benhaddad, Tchikou, Lardjane, Beddaréne, Zouaoui, Chabri, Naït Kaci.

19 March 1950 Round 16	AS Kouba	1–1	USM Alger	Kouba
		Report	Rabah Zouaoui 75'	Stadium: Stade de Kouba
Note: Lineup for USM Alger - , , , , , , , , , , .

2 April 1950 Round 17	JS Birtouta	1–0	USM Alger	Birtouta
	Antoine 65'	Report		Stadium: Stade de Birtouta
Note: Lineup for USM Alger - , , , , , , , , , , .

16 April 1950 Round 18	SCU El Biar	2–1	USM Alger	El Biar
	Vidal.H; Falzon	Report	Rabah Zouaoui 36'	Stadium: Stade de El Biar
Note: Lineup for USM Alger - , , , , , , , , , , .

== Forconi Cup ==
11 September 1949 First Round	USM Alger	5–1	GS Rovigo	Kouba
	Mohamed Hamdi (?); Djaknoune (?); Abderrahmene Hamadouchi (?); Rabah Zouaoui (?); Zoubir Naït Kaci (?)	Report
Note: Lineup for USM Alger - Zitouni, Bouadjadj, Allel Ouaguenouni, Mustapha Ouaguenouni, Ahmed Azzouz, Zouaoui, Djaknoune, Beddaréne, Bisco, Hamdaoui, Naït Kaci.

18 September 1949 Second Round	USM Alger	4–0	SCM Blida	Boufarik
	Azzouz (?); Naït Kaci (?); Hamadouchi (?); Ouaguenouni (?)	Report
Note: Lineup for USM Alger - , , , , , , , , , , .

2 October 1949 Third Round	USM Alger	3–1	SCU El Biar	Hydra
14:00	Hamadouchi (?); Zouaoui (?); Bouadjadj (?)	Report	Benaiche (?)
Note: Lineup for USM Alger - Zitouni, Bouadjadj, Allel Ouaguenouni, Mustapha Ouaguenouni, Chabri, Hamdaoui, Bisco, Beddaréne, Zouaoui, Azzouz, Hamdi.

5 November 1949 Fourth Round	AS Boufarik	3–4 (a.e.t.)	USM Alger	Maison Carrée
14:00	Radegonde (?); Hervieu (?); Defrance (?)	Report	Hamadouchi (?); Bouriou (?)	Referee: Boccechiampe
Note: Lineup for USM Alger - Zitouni, Allel Ouaguenouni, Beddaréne, Bisco, Hamdi, Bouadjadj, Azzouz, Bouriou, Benhaddad, Mustapha Ouaguenouni, Hamdaoui.

3 December 1949 Round of 16	MC Alger	5–1	USM Alger	Belcourt
14:00	Khelil 15'; Bennour 35'; Azzef 40', 55'; Derriche 87'	Report	Zouaoui 90+1'	Stadium: Stade municipal Referee: Riveccio
Note: Lineup for USM Alger - Zitouni, Allel Ouaguenouni, Bisco, Bouadjadj, Larbi, Azzouz, Hamadoui, Zouaoui, Chabri, Beddaréne, Benhaddad.

== Squad information ==
=== Playing statistics ===
Pos.	Player	Première Division																		Forconi Cup					Total
Pos.	Player	1	2	3	4	5	6	7	8	9	10	11	12	13	14	15	16	17	18	1	2	3	4	5	Total
GK	(France) Hassen Zitouni				X	X	X									X				X		X	X	X	
GK	(France) Otmane Kassiane																								
GK	(France) Mohamed Zebairi																								
DF	(France) Allel Ouaguenouni				X	X										X				X		X	X	X	
DF	(France) Mustapha Ouaguenouni				X	X	X									X				X		X	X		
FW	(France) Moustapha El Kamal																								
DF	(France) Dahmane Hamadouche "Bisco"				X	X	X													X		X	X	X	
FW	(France) Mohamed Hamdi					X	X															X	X		
	(France) Ahmed Azzouz				X	X	X													X		X	X	X	
	(France) Moustapha Bouriou																						X		
DF	(France) Kamel Benhaddad					X	X									X							X	X	
	(France) Bouzid Hamdaoui				X	X	X													X		X	X	X	
	(France) Mohamed El Cherif Larbi																							X	
FW	(France) Rabah Zouaoui				X											X				X		X		X	
FW	(France) Rabah Beddaréne						X									X				X		X	X	X	
DF	(France) Zoubir Bouadjadj				X	X	X									X				X		X	X	X	
DF	(France) Hacène Chabri				X	X	X									X						X		X	
	(France) Said Ben Mihoubi				X		X																		
FW	(France) Krimo Rebih																								
	(France) Mohamed Messat					X																			
	(France) Ammar Aidoune				X																				
	(France) Abdelkader Tchikou															X									
	(France) Mohamed El Mahdi																								
	(France) Zoubir Naït Kaci															X				X					
	(France) Abdelkader Djaknoun																			X					
	(France) Cherif Moussa																								
	(France) Paul Soussi																								
	(France) Omar Djazairi																								
	(France) Ahmed Alim																								
	(France) Ahmed Achir																								
	(France) Salah Lardjane																								
	(France) Toumi Lardjane																								
	(France) Abdelkader Chemlal																								
	(France) Zoubir Benganif																								

=== Goalscorers ===
Includes all competitive matches. The list is sorted alphabetically by surname when total goals are equal.

Nat.	Player	Pos.	PD	FC	TOTAL
(France)	Rabah Zouaoui	FW	12	3	15
(France)	Dahmane Hamadouche "Bisco"	DF	0	5	5
(France)	Zoubir Naït Kaci	?	3	2	5
(France)	Hacène Chabri	DF	4	0	4
(France)	Rabah Beddaréne	?	3	0	3
(France)	Ahmed Azzouz	?	2	1	3
(France)	Moustapha Bouriou	?	0	2	2
(France)	Mohamed Hamdi	FW	1	1	2
(France)	Abdelkader Djaknoun	?	0	1	1
(France)	Zoubir Bouadjadj	DF	0	1	1
(France)	Ammar Aidoune	?	1	0	1
(France)	Allel Ouaguenouni	DF	1	0	1
Own Goals			0	0	0
Totals			28	17	45
