= 1952–53 USM Alger season =

USM Alger
1952–53 season
- President: Mohamed Zenagui
- Head coach: Abderrahman Ibrir
- Stadium: Stade Marcel Cerdan
- First Division: 8th
- Forconi Cup: First Round

In the 1952–53 season, USM Alger was competing in the Second Division for the 16th season French colonial era, as well as the Forconi Cup. They competed in First Division, and the Forconi Cup.

== Review ==
At the end of the last season, USM Alger, in coordination with its main supporters, organized a recreational outing to the Sidi Fredj beach on May 18, 1952, for the benefit of the players and loyal fans of the club, in a friendly and relaxed atmosphere. During the holy month of Ramadan, the club also hosted musical evenings led by the dean of popular Algerian music, Cheikh El Hadj M'Hamed El Anka, a symbolic artist who often sang for USMA on various occasions, thus strengthening the cultural ties between the club and its community.

The Board of Directors met on May 12 and 30 in preparation for the extraordinary general assembly, which was held on June 20 under the presidency of Mohamed Zenagui, with the presence of active, honorary, and beneficiary members, at the club's headquarters. Finally, the founding general assembly took place on July 6 and 12 and concluded on the same day with the first meeting of the new Board of Directors, marking the beginning of a new chapter in the club’s organization.

A new meeting of the USM Alger Board of Directors was held on July 30, 1952, marking an important step in preparations for the new season. On this occasion, both former and new players were introduced to the coach, who immediately began physical and technical training sessions starting from the first week of August 1952. Meanwhile, the Algiers Football League held a general assembly on June 28 to address various issues facing football in Algiers and its surroundings. The meeting brought together presidents from most clubs, particularly those playing in the Division d’Honneur, who submitted their proposals and demands to the League. Among these were: The creation of an intermediate division between the Division d’Honneur and the First Division (called “Pré honneur”) A revision of the playoff system. However, no concrete decisions were made on the matter.

== Squad list ==
Players and squad numbers last updated on 30 September 1951.
Note: Flags indicate national team as has been defined under FIFA eligibility rules. Players may hold more than one non-FIFA nationality.

Nat.	Position	Name	Date of Birth (Age)	Signed from
(France)	LB	Allel Ouaguenouni		(France)
(France)	CB	Mustapha Ouaguenouni	4 November 1924 (aged 27)	(France)
(France)	LB	Zoubir Bouadjadj	4 October 1925 (aged 26)	(France)
(France)	MF	Abdelkader Zerrar	10 January 1934 (aged 18)	(France)
(France)	ST	Rabah Zouaoui	19 April 1920 (aged 32)	(France) RS Alger
(France)	ST	Krimo Rebih	1 May 1932 (aged 20)	(France) Youth system
(France)	ST	Saadi Yacef	20 January 1928 (aged 24)	(France)
(France)		Abdelkader Belkaroui		(France)
(France)		Boualem Mekkiri		(France)
(France)		Hamid Chibane		(France)
(France)		Zoubir Naït Kaci		(France)

== Competitions ==
=== Overview ===
Competition	Record								Started round	Final position / round	First match	Last match
Competition	G	W	D	L	GF	GA	GD	Win %	Started round	Final position / round	First match	Last match
First Division	18	4	8	6	22	27	−5	22.22	—N/a		28 September 1952	29 March 1953
Forconi Cup	1	0	0	1	0	2	−2	0.00	First Round		2 November 1952	
Total	19	4	8	7	22	29	−7	21.05				

=== First Division ===
==== League table ====
Groupe III
Pos	Team	Pld	W	D	L	GF	GA	GD	Pts	Qualification
6	NA Hussein Dey	18	5	7	6	0	0	0	35	
7	OM Saint Eugène	18	3	10	5	0	0	0	34	
8	USM Alger	18	4	8	6	0	0	0	34	
9	AS Kouba	18	4	7	7	0	0	0	33	Relegated to 1953–54 Second Division
10	Olympique de Médéa	18	0	7	11	0	0	0	25	Relegated to 1953–54 Second Division

Source: L'Echo d'Alger

==== Results by round ====
Round	1	2	3	4	5	6	7	8	9	10	11	12	13	14	15	16	17	18
Ground	H	A	H	A	A	H	A	A	H	A	H	A	H	H	A	H	H	A
Result	D	W	L	D	D	D	L	L	W	D	L	D	L		D	W		W
Position									6	6			7			7		8

Updated to match(es) played on 14 May 1952. Source: Competitive matches
A = Away; H = Home; W = Win; D = Draw; L = Loss

=== Matches ===
Win Draw Loss

28 September 1952 Round 1	USM Alger	0–0	NA Hussein Dey	Algiers
	Belhout, Ouaguenouni, Hamadouche, Mérabet, Achir, Chibane, Yacef, Benhaik, Rebih, Zouaoui, Azzouz - Coach Abderrahman Ibrir.	Report		Stadium: Stade Marcel Cerdan; Referee: Caratino

5 October 1952 Round 2	ASPTT Alger	0–1	USM Alger	Algiers
		Report	Yacef 88' (pen.) Belhout, Mérabet, Hamadouche, Allel Ouaguenouni, Achir, Saadi Yacef, Krimo Rebih, Chibane, Rabah Zouaoui, Semghouni, Belkaroui Abdelkader.	Stadium: Stade Marcel Cerdan; Referee: Ange Perez

26 October 1952 Round 4	OM Saint Eugène	2–2	USM Alger	Saint Eugène
	Kargas (?); Abdeltif 70'	Report	Naït Kaci 68'; Rabah Zouaoui 80' Belhout, Mérabet, Hamadouche, Ouaguenouni, Sadi, Saadi Yacef, Achir I, Achir II, Krimo Rebih, Rabah Zouaoui, Naït Kaci.	Stadium: Stade Communal de Saint Eugène; Referee: Boccheciampe

9 November 1952 Round 5	AS Kouba	1–1	USM Alger	Kouba
15:00	? 15'	Report	? 55' Belhout, Hamadouche, Ouaguenouni, Saadi Yacef, Achir I, Achir II, Krimo Rebih, Naït Kaci, Chibane, Anani, Bouali.	Referee: Lancelot

16 November 1952 Round 6	USM Alger	1–1	ES Zéralda	Algiers
	Yacef (?) Belhout, Mérabet, Hamadouche, Allel Ouaguenouni, Saadi Yacef, Achir I, Achir II, Naït Kaci, Chibane, Rabah Zouaoui, Amouri.	Report	Simo (?)	Stadium: Stade Marcel Cerdan; Referee: Attanasio Casimir

30 November 1952 Round 7	OCB Oued-Fodda	3–2	USM Alger	Oued Fodda
	Ouafi 5', 55'; Morata 21'	Report	Rabah Zouaoui 31' (pen.), 33' Belhout, Ouaguenouni, Hamadouche, Bouadjadj, Achir, Naït Kaci, Saadi Yacef, Chibane, Rabah Zouaoui, Abdelkader Zerrar, Krims.	Referee: Lebeuvant

7 December 1952 (Note: The match was originally to be played on 19 October 1952, but it was postponed.) Round 3	USM Alger	0–1	WA Boufarik	Algiers
	Belhout, Mérabet, Hamadouche, Ouaguenouni, Saadi Yacef, Krimo Rebih, Chibane, Benhaik, Achir, Bouadjadj, Naït Kaci.	Report	Bachtarzi (?)	Stadium: Stade Marcel Cerdan; Referee: Caratino

21 December 1952 Round 9	USM Alger	3–1	Olympique de Médéa	Algiers
	Saàdi 55' (?); Rabah Zouaoui (?) Belhout, Mérabet, Hamadouche, Ouaguenouni, Saadi Yacef, Chibane, Naït Kaci, Achir, Rabah Zouaoui, Benhaik, Saàdi.	Report	Tchikou 52'	Stadium: Stade Marcel Cerdan; Referee: Di Méglio

28 December 1952 (Note: The match was originally to be played on 14 December 1952, but it was postponed.) Round 8	GS Alger	1–0	USM Alger	Belcourt
	Salva 75'	Report	Belhout, Benhaik, Hamadouche, Ouaguenouni, Achir, Naït Kaci, Sadi, Chibane, Rabah Zouaoui, Krimo Rebih, Abdelkader Zerrar.	Stadium: Stade municipal

4 January 1953 Round 10	NA Hussein Dey	0–0	USM Alger	Hussein Dey
	Bachet, Boudjemaâ, Chabani, Boudissa, Adder, Marouf, Zioui, Maddi, Lardjane, Chaouane, Tchikov.	Report	Bellout, Ouaguenouni, Bouadjadj, Naït Kaci, Merabet, Achir, Krimo Rebih, Saadi Yacef, Zerrar, Zouaoui, Chibane.	Stadium: Stade Municipal; Referee: Lapasset

11 January 1953 Round 11	USM Alger	0–3	ASPTT Alger	Algiers
	Bellout, Ouaguenouni, Bouadjadj, Naït Kaci, Chibane, Krimo Rebih, Zouaoui, Hacène, Kader, Senghouni, Biscou.	Report	Chaouane; Mari Kesdit, Pugilése, Ben Amar, Chaouane, Climent, Saadi, Kerraz, Mari, Lombardi, Chetmi, Loupi.	Stadium: Stade Marcel Cerdan; Referee: Cheltiel

18 January 1953 Round 12	WA Boufarik	2–2	USM Alger	Boufarik
	Koudri 43'; Bachtarzi 75' Ahras, Bouricha I, Larbi, Koudri, Belaïd, Rezig I, Bachtarzi, Bouricha II, Rezig II, Charef, Ali Cherif.	Report	Achir 18', 32' Bellout, Merabet, Ouaguenouni, Hamadouche, Naït Kaci, Achir I, Achir II, Krimo Rebih, Zouaoui, Zerrar, Mouhab.	Stadium: Stade Maréchal Foch; Referee: Abdelaziz Chekaïmi

1 February 1953 Round 13	USM Alger	1–2	OM Saint Eugène	Algiers
	Bellout, Hamadouche, Ouaguenouni, Mérabet, Achir I, Naït Kaci, Saadi Yacef, Krimo Rebih, Zerrar, Achir II, Chibane.	Report	Belkretaoui; Zitouni Chenaf, Zitouni, Bourouba, Aït Said, Abdallah, El Madaoui, Henlaoui, Zoula, Belkretaoui, Benyoucef, Abdeltis.	Stadium: Stade Marcel Cerdan

8 February 1953 Round 14	USM Alger	2–2	AS Kouba	Algiers
	Krimo (?); ? (?) Bellout, Ouaguenouni, Hamadouche, Bouadjadj, Mérabet, Naït Kaci, Achir I, Férane, Achir II, Krimo Rebih.	Report	Martinache 15'; Salom 19' Candella, Quil, Blaison, Grétien, Rival, Hidalgo, Mazonni, Salom, Martinache, Poizat, Impérato.	Stadium: Stade Marcel Cerdan; Referee: Attanasio

22 February 1953 Round 15	ES Zéralda	1–1	USM Alger	Zéralda
	Tur (?) Signés, Moussi, Motta, Addad, Loffrédo, Lahal, Capomaccie, Simo, Mari, Kebladj, Tur.	Report	Beddarine (?) Bellout, Beddarine, Ouaguenouni, Zenadi, Amani, Hamadouche, Zouaoui, Mekkiri Boualem, Moutrib, Naït Kaci.	Referee: Borg

1 March 1953 Round 16	USM Alger	3–0	OCB Oued-Fodda	Algiers
	Rabah Zouaoui 5' (pen.); Zaâr 9' Bellout, Hamadouche, Allel Ouaguenouni, Mustapha Ouaguenouni, Mekkiri Boualem, Naït Kaci, Achir, Hamid Chibane, Rabah Zouaoui, Zaâr, Azzouz.	Report	Martinez, Ponzio, Itni, Ben Bouali, Morata, Saia, Ouaffi, Tahiri, Bordonado, Bernardi I, Bernardi II.	Stadium: Stade Marcel Cerdan; Referee: Kalfoun

22 March 1953 Round 17	USM Alger	0–7	GS Alger	Algiers
	Bellout, Ouaguenouni, Hamadouche, Zehrar, Achir, Mekkiri Boualem, Chibane, Zouaoui, Naït Kaci, Azzouz.	Report	Bagur 21', 50' (?); Deléo 77', 78', 82', 85' Fabiano, Ferrasse, Fortuné, Lapasset, Torrés, Calmus, Biton, Bagur, Mercadal, Azef, Deléo.	Stadium: Stade Marcel Cerdan

29 March 1953 Round 18	Olympique de Médéa	0–3	USM Alger	Médéa
	, , , , , , , , , , .	Report	, , , , , , , , , , .

== Forconi Cup ==
2 November 1952 First Round	O Hussein Dey	2–0 (a.e.t.)	USM Alger	Belcourt
	Serrano 97'; Perret 112' (pen.)	Report	Belhout, Mérabet, Hamadouche, Allel Ouaguenouni, Sadi, Achir I, Achir II, Krimo Rebih, Rabah Zouaoui, Naït Kaci, Chibane.	Stadium: Stade municipal Referee: Fourié

== Squad information ==
=== Playing statistics ===
P.	Player	First Division																		FC	Total
P.	Player	1	2	3	4	5	6	7	8	9	10	11	12	13	14	15	16	17	18	1	Total
GK	(France) Belhout																			X	
GK	(France) Maammar Azef																				
DF	(France) Allel Ouaguenouni																			X	
DF	(France) Mustapha Ouaguenouni																				
DF	(France) Zoubir Bouadjadj																				
MF	(France) Abdelkader Zerrar																				
FW	(France) Saadi Yacef																			X	
FW	(France) Krimo Rebih																			X	
FW	(France) Rabah Zouaoui																			X	
FW	(France) Ahmed Azzouz																				
	(France) Zoubir Naït Kaci																			X	
	(France) Hamid Chibane																			X	
RB	(France) Dahmane Hamadouche																			X	
	(France) Abdelkader Mérabet																			X	
	(France) Ahmed Achir																				
	(France) Ramadan Achir																				
	(France) Ammar Achir																				
	(France) Boualem Benhaik																				
	(France) Abdelkader Belkaraoui																				
	(France) Hamid Benali																				
	(France) Boualem Djoumay																				
	(France) Mohamed Larbi																				
	(France) Ahmed Zeghouane																				
	(France) Rabah Bedaréne																				
	(France) M'hamed Ammani																				
	(France) Mohamed Semghouni																				
	(France) Boualem Mouhab																				
	(France) Abdelkader Berbachi																				
	(France) Moustapha Bouazzaz																				
	(France) Abderrahmane Ramdane																				
	(France) Boualem Debbay																				
	(France) Khader Moutreb																				
	(France) M'aammar Ammouri																				
	(France) Benaïssa Azef																				

=== Goalscorers ===
Includes all competitive matches. The list is sorted alphabetically by surname when total goals are equal.

Nat.	Player	Pos.	PD	FC	TOTAL
(France)	Rabah Zouaoui	FW	6	0	6
(France)	Saadi Yacef		2	0	2
(France)	Saàdi		2	0	2
(France)	Achir		2	0	2
(France)	Zoubir Naït Kaci		1	0	1
(France)	Krimo Rebih	FW	1	0	1
(France)	Rabah Bedaréne		1	0	1
(France)	Zaâr		1	0	1
Own Goals			0	0	0
Totals			16	0	16
