= 1950–51 USM Alger season =

USM Alger
1950–51 season
- President: Mohamed Zenagui
- Head coach: Hamid Akliouat
- Stadium: Stade Marcel Cerdan, Algiers
- First Division: 7th
- Forconi Cup: Third Round
- Top goalscorer: League: Naït Kaci, Chabri (5 goals); All: Hacène Chabri (8 goals)

In the 1950–51 season, USM Alger is competing in the Second Division for the 14th season French colonial era, as well as the Forconi Cup. They competing in First Division, and the Forconi Cup.

== Review ==
As part of their preparations for the new season, USM Alger began their activities very early by opening the door to new player signings and renewing the licenses of several veterans as early as July 1950, in order to preserve the team's experience and stability despite the advanced age of some players. Physical training sessions started in the club's gym located on Bone Street, while technical training sessions were held on various pitches from the beginning of August, with the aim of preparing the players physically and tactically for the upcoming season. On the technical side, the club's former coach, Mr. Mustapha El Kamal, joined OM Saint Eugène and was replaced by Mr. Hamid Akliouat, who was officially presented to players of all categories on October 6, 1950, at the club's headquarters.

== Squad list ==
Players and squad numbers last updated on 24 September 1950.
Note: Flags indicate national team as has been defined under FIFA eligibility rules. Players may hold more than one non-FIFA nationality.

Nat.	Position	Name	Date of Birth (Age)	Signed from
(France)	GK	Hassen Zitouni		(France)
(France)	LB	Zoubir Bouadjadj	4 October 1925 (aged 24)	(France) Youth system
(France)	LB	Allel Ouaguenouni		(France)
(France)	LB	Zoubir Bouadjadj	4 October 1925 (aged 24)	(France)
(France)	CB	Mustapha Ouaguenouni	4 November 1924 (aged 25)	(France) MC Alger
(France)	ST	Rabah Zouaoui	19 April 1920 (aged 30)	(France) RS Alger
(France)	DF	Hacène Chabri	25 April 1931 (aged 19)	(France)
(France)	ST	Abdelhamid Kermali	24 April 1931 (aged 19)	(France) USM Sétif
(France)	ST	Krimo Rebih	1 May 1932 (aged 18)	(France) Youth system
(France)		Zoubir Naït Kaci		(France)
(France)	RB	Dahmane Hamadouche "Bisco"		(France) MC Alger
(France)		Rabah Bedaréne		(France)
(France)		Ahmed Azzouz		(France)

== Competitions ==
=== Overview ===
Competition	Record								Started round	Final position / round	First match	Last match
Competition	G	W	D	L	GF	GA	GD	Win %	Started round	Final position / round	First match	Last match
First Division	18	6	5	7	27	26	+1	33.33	—N/a	7th	24 September 1950	25 March 1951
Forconi Cup	3	2	0	1	11	5	+6	66.67	First Round	Third Round	3 September 1950	7 October 1950
Total	21	8	5	8	38	31	+7	38.10				

== League table ==
=== Group II ===
Pos	Team	Pld	W	D	L	GF	GA	GD	Pts	Promotion or relegation
1	OM Saint Eugène (C)	18	11	4	3	31	14	+17	44	Qualified for the "Tournament of the first" (Note: Champion, qualified for the "Tournament of the first" and fight both the title of First Division Champion and accession in Division Honneur. Also note that the second of this tournament is crowned Vice-champion and also accessed by higher division.)
2	JS Kabylie	18	10	5	3	38	25	+13	43	Qualified for the "second tournament" (Note: Vice-Champion, qualified for the "second tournament" qualifying the dam third place against the last of the "first of the tournament," is the last place in the Accession Division Honneur. This classification match is honorary because that means the barrage also third in the First Division)
3	GS Alger-Hydra	18	11	2	5	31	18	+13	42	
4	O. Tizi Ouzou	18	9	3	6	29	25	+4	39	
5	USM Maison Carrée	18	7	6	5	21	17	+4	38	
6	U.S.A. Fort de l'Eau	18	8	4	6	21	18	+3	38	
7	USM Alger	18	6	5	7	27	26	+1	35	
8	SC Alger	18	6	2	10	18	25	−7	32	
9	O. Rouïba	18	4	1	13	10	35	−25	27	Relegation zone (Note: Second last, relegation zone, is playing the "Tournament of the ninth" last chance not to go down to the second division, « 2F/A ». The first two of this tournament are saved.)
10	AS Rivet	18	1	2	15	16	39	−23	22	Relegation zone (Note: Last, second and last relegation, fight the "tenths of tournament," the winner of this tournament is playing a dam against the last of the "ninth of the tournament," sort of "barrier" not to go down to the second division « 2F/A »)

(C) Champions

=== Matches ===
Win Draw Loss

24 September 1950 Round 1	U.S.A. Fort de l'Eau	1–0	USM Alger	Fort-de-l'Eau
		Report		Stadium: Stade Fort-de-l'Eau
Note: Lineup for USM Alger - Zitouni, Chabri, Larbi, Bedaréne, Naït Kaci, Allel Ouaguenouni, Hamadouche, Mustapha Ouaguenouni, Zouaoui, Benaddad, Bouadjadj.

1 October 1950 Round 2	USM Alger	0–0	OM Saint Eugène	Algiers
		Report		Stadium: Stade Marcel Cerdan
Note: Lineup for USM Alger - Zitouni, Bouadjadj, Allel Ouaguenouni, Mustapha Ouaguenouni, Hamdi, Ben Guenife, Ben Mihoub, Chabri, Hamadouche, Naït Kaci, Larbi.

15 October 1950 Round 3	USM Alger	0–0	USM Maison Carrée	Algiers
		Report		Stadium: Stade Marcel Cerdan; Referee: Roméro
Note: Lineup for USM Alger - Zitouni, Bouadjadj, Allel Ouaguenouni, Mustapha Ouaguenouni, Bedjani, Larbi, Naït Kaci, Chabri, Zouaoui, Hamadouche, Hassan.

29 October 1950 Round 4	O. Tizi Ouzou	2–0	USM Alger	Tizi Ouzou
		Report		Stadium: Stade Arsène Weinman
Note: Lineup for USM Alger - Zitouni, Chabri, Bedaréne, Hamadouche, Naït Kaci, Allel Ouaguenouni, Mustapha Ouaguenouni, Larbi, Bouadjadj, Bedjani, Merouad.

12 November 1950 Round 5	USM Alger	5–0	AS Rivet	Algiers
	Zoubir Bouadjadj; Boualem Bedjani; Zoubir Naït Kaci; ?; ?	Report		Stadium: Stade Marcel Cerdan
Note: Lineup for USM Alger - , , , , , , , , , , .

19 November 1950 Round 6	O. Rouïba	0–1	USM Alger	Rouïba
		Report	Ahmed Azzouz 16'	Stadium: Stade de Rouïba; Referee: Tréguler
Note: Lineup for USM Alger - Zitouni, Messat, Chabri, Moustapha Ben Hamed, Ouaguenouni, Bedjani, Hamadouche, Larbi, Bouzar, Naït Kaci, Azzouz.

26 November 1950 Round 7	USM Alger	0–1	SC Alger	Algiers
		Report		Stadium: Stade Marcel Cerdan
Note: Lineup for USM Alger - Zitouni, Ouaguenouni, Bouadjadj, Bedjani, Messat, Larbi, Hamadouche, Chabri, Zouaoui, Naït Kaci, Azzouz.

16 December 1950 Round 8	JS Kabylie	5–2	USM Alger	Tizi Ouzou
	Belhadj 10' (?); Iratni ? (?); Okbi	Report	Ben Mihoubi; Naït Kaci 89'	Stadium: Stade Arsène Weinman; Referee: Di Méglio
Note: Lineup for USM Alger - Chemlal, Khalef, Ouaguenouni, Chabri, Merabet, Ben Mihoubi, Bedjani, Azzouz, Tchico, Bedaréne, Naït Kaci.

24 December 1950 Round 9	USM Alger	4–0	GS Alger-Hydra	Algiers
	Ahmed Azzouz (?); Hacène Chabri (?); Dahmane Hamadouche (?)	Report		Stadium: Stade Marcel Cerdan; Referee: Rizzo
Note: Lineup for USM Alger - Zitouni, Hamadouche, Allel Ouaguenouni, Mustapha Ouaguenouni, Chabri, Bedjani, Hamid Benali, Bedaréne, Ben Mihoubi, Azzouz, Naït Kaci.

7 January 1951 Round 10	USM Alger	2–4	U.S.A. Fort de l'Eau	Algiers
	Hacène Chabri (?); Zoubir Naït Kaci (?)	Report		Stadium: Stade Marcel Cerdan
Note: Lineup for USM Alger - Zitouni, Hamadouche, Allel Ouaguenouni, Mustapha Ouaguenouni, Chabri, Bouhou, Bedjani, Ben Mihoubi, Azzouz, Naït Kaci, Bedaréne.

14 January 1951 Round 11	OM Saint Eugène	0–0	USM Alger	Saint Eugène
		Report		Stadium: Stade Communal de Saint Eugène; Referee: Delpeuch
Note: Lineup for USM Alger - Zitouni, Allel Ouaguenouni, Mustapha Ouaguenouni, Bedjani, Chabri, Hamid Benali, Tchico, Azzouz, Naït Kaci, Bedaréne, Hamadouche.

28 January 1951 Round 12	USM Maison Carrée	1–1	USM Alger	Maison-Carrée
	? (?)	Report	Zoubir Naït Kaci (?)	Stadium: Stade Lavigerie
Note: Lineup for USM Alger - , , , , , , , , , , .

18 February 1951 Round 13	USM Alger	0–0	O. Tizi Ouzou	Algiers
		Report		Stadium: Stade Marcel Cerdan
Note: Lineup for USM Alger - Zitouni, Bedjani, Ouaguenouni, Naït Kaci, Bouadjadj, Kermali, Chabri, Bedaréne, Azzouz, Hamadouche, Hamid Benali.

11 February 1951 Round 14	AS Rivet	1–3	USM Alger	Algiers
		Report	Hacène Chabri (?); Ouaguenouni (?); Zoubir Naït Kaci (?)	Stadium: Stade Municipal de Rivet
Note: Lineup for USM Alger - , , , , , , , , , , .

25 February 1951 Round 15	USM Alger	4–0	O. Rouïba	Algiers
	Zouaoui 5', 77'; Bedjani 23'; Bedaréne 67'	Report		Stadium: Stade Marcel Cerdan
Note: Lineup for USM Alger - Zitouni, Allel Ouaguenouni, Mustapha Ouaguenouni, Bouadjadj, Bedjani, Zouaoui, Azzouz, Naït Kaci, Bedaréne, Kermali, Zoubir Ben Guenife.

4 March 1951 Round 16	SC Alger	1–3	USM Alger	Algiers
	Lombardo 75'	Report	Hacène Chabri (?); Rabah Zouaoui (?); Ahmed Azzouz (?)	Stadium: Stade Marcel Cerdan
Note: Lineup for USM Alger - Zitouni, Ouaguenouni, Hamadouche, Bedaréne, Chabri, Bouadjadj, Bedjani, Zoubir Ben Guenife, Zouaoui, Naït Kaci, Azzouz.

18 March 1951 Round 17	USM Alger	1–3	JS Kabylie	Algiers
	Ahmed Azzouz (?)			Stadium: Stade Marcel Cerdan; Referee: Rizzo
Note: Lineup for USM Alger - , , , , , , , , , , .

1 April 1951 Round 18	GS Alger-Hydra	5–1	USM Alger	Hydra
			Rabah Zouaoui (?)	Stadium: Stade de Hydra
Note: Lineup for USM Alger - , , , , , , , , , , .

== Forconi Cup ==
3 September 1950 First Round	USM Alger	3–0	JSI Issers	Rouiba
	? (?); Zouaoui (?); Hamadouche (?)	Report
Note: Lineup for USM Alger - Zitouni, Allel Ouaguenouni, Mustapha Ouaguenouni, Benhaddad, Hassan, Bouaazzaz, Hamadouche, Zouaoui, Bedaréne, Chabri, Larbi.

17 September 1950 Second Round	USM Alger	6–1	US Ben Aknoun	Hussein Dey
	Zouaoui (?); Bedaréne (?); Ouaguenouni (?); Hacène Chabri (?)	Report
Note: Lineup for USM Alger - , , , , , , , , , , .

7 October 1950 Third Round	OM Saint Eugène	4–1	USM Alger	Hydra
	Aouadj (?), 57'; Bachtarzi 35', 55'	Report	Zouber 83'	Stadium: Stade de Hydra
Note: Lineup for USM Alger - Zitouni, Bouadjadj, Allel Ouaguenouni, Mustapha Ouaguenouni, Larbi, Zouber, Naït Kaci, Chabri, Belkaraoui, Zouaoui, Hamadouche.

== Squad information ==
=== Playing statistics ===
In rounds 6, 7, 8, 13, 16, it is not known who was the player who participated, Allel or Mustapha Ouaguenouni.

Pos.	Player	Première Division																		FC			Total
Pos.	Player	1	2	3	4	5	6	7	8	9	10	11	12	13	14	15	16	17	18	1	2	3	Total
GK	(France) Hassen Zitouni	X	X	X	X		X	X		X	X	X		X		X	X			X		X	14
GK	(France) Otmane Kassiane																						
GK	(France) Meziane Madjak																						
GK	(France) Rabah Hachlaf																						
DF	(France) Hacène Chabri	X	X	X	X		X	X	X	X	X	X		X			X			X		X	14
	(France) Mohamed Larbi	X	X	X	X		X	X												X		X	8
	(France) Zoubir Naït Kaci	X	X	X	X		X	X	X	X	X	X		X		X	X					X	14
DF	(France) Allel Ouaguenouni	X	X	X	X					X	X	X				X				X		X	10
DF	(France) Mustapha Ouaguenouni	X	X	X	X					X	X	X				X				X		X	10
FW	(France) Rabah Zouaoui	X		X				X								X	X			X		X	7
DF	(France) Zoubir Bouadjadj	X	X	X	X			X						X		X	X					X	9
	(France) Hamid Benali									X		X		X									3
FW	(France) Rabah Bedaréne	X			X				X	X	X	X		X		X	X			X			10
RB	(France) Dahmane Hamadouche	X	X	X	X		X	X		X	X	X		X			X			X		X	13
DF	(France) Kamal Benhaddad	X																		X			2
	(France) Mohamed Hamdi		X																				1
	(France) Said Ben Mihoubi		X						X	X	X												4
	(France) Rabah Hassan			X																X			2
	(France) Boualem Bedjani			X	X		X	X	X	X	X	X		X		X	X						11
	(France) Mhamed Merouad				X																		1
	(France) Said Bouhou										X												1
	(France) Ahmed Azzouz						X	X	X	X	X	X		X		X	X						9
	(France) Mohamed Messat						X	X															2
	(France) Zoubir Ben Guenife		X													X	X					X	4
	(France) Kamal Bouzar						X																1
	(France) Moustapha Ben Hamed						X																1
	(France) Abdelkader Belkaraoui																					X	1
ST	(France) Abdelhamid Kermali													X		X							2
ST	(France) Krimo Rebih																						
MF	(France) Ali Zemmouri																						
	(France) Mohamed Alim																						
	(France) Dehmane Dial																						
	(France) Abderrahmene Yakhlef																						
	(France) Mohamed Bennaf																						
	(France) Hamid Bouaiza																						
	(France) Maamar Ben Ahmed																						
	(France) Ammar Telmoune																						
	(France) Mohamed Haridi																						
	(France) Mohamed Chaid																						
	(France) Abdelkader Merabit								X														1
	(France) Salah Lardjane																						
	(France) Madani Madni																						
	(France) Boualem Rekkal																						
	(France) M'hamed Boudjnoun																						
	(France) Taieb Lakhder																						
	(France) Mohamed Ramdani																						
	(France) Mohamed Meramilla																						
	(France) Abdelkader El Farhi																						
	(France) Bouzid Ghalmi																						
	(France) Ali Khalef								X														1
	(France) Ammar Amrouche																						
	(France) Ammar Lakesirat																						
	(France) Mehdi Kidami																						
	(France) Abdelkader Daich																						
	(France) Mohamed Kike																						
	(France) Abderrahmene Khadel																						
	(France) Moussa Cherif																						
	(France) Abdelkader Tchico								X			X											2
GK	(France) Chemlal								X														1
	(France) Moustapha Bouaazzaz																			X			1

=== Goalscorers ===
Includes all competitive matches. The list is sorted alphabetically by surname when total goals are equal.

Nat.	Player	PD	FC	TOTAL
(France)	Hacène Chabri	5	3	8
(France)	Rabah Zouaoui	4	2	6
(France)	Zoubir Naït Kaci	5	0	5
(France)	Ahmed Azzouz	4	0	4
(France)	Rabah Bedaréne	1	1	2
(France)	Boualem Bedjani	2	0	2
(France)	Dahmane Hamadouche	1	1	2
(France)	Ouaguenouni	1	1	2
(France)	Zoubir Ben Guenife	0	1	1
(France)	Zoubir Bouadjadj	1	0	1
(France)	Said Ben Mihoubi	1	0	1
Own Goals		0	1	1
Totals		27	10	37
