= Espérance de Bab El Oued =

- Founded: 2013 (13 years ago)
- Ground: Stade Mohamed Ferhani; Bab El Oued, Algeria
- Capacity: 3,800
- League: Algerian Women's Championship

Espérance de Bab El Oued (Arabic: أمل باب الواد, lit. 'Hope of Bab El Oued') is a women's professional football club based in Bab El Oued, Algeria. The club is playing in the Algerian Women's Championship, the top division in the Algerian female football league system.

== History ==
On June 18, 2023 USM Alger has just signed an agreement with Espérance de Bab El Oued, a second division women's team, to wear the red and black colors this season. Being in the obligation to have a women's team to be able to register in African competition this season with the last deadline June 20. The renewable agreement runs for one year from July 1, 2023, to June 30, 2024.
