= Mustapha Ouaguenouni =

Algerian nationalist figure

- Mustapha Ouaguenouni
- Born: 4 November 1924; Casbah Algiers, French Algeria
- Died: 2 August 1957 (aged 32); Algiers, French Algeria
- Cause of death: Tortured and executed
- Known for: National Liberation Front; National Liberation Army; Algerian War; Battle of Algiers
- Movement: FLN

Mustapha Ouaguenouni (Arabic: مصطفى واقنوني; 4 November 1924 – 2 August 1957) was an Algerian footballer who played as a central defender for MC Alger and later USM Alger during the pre-independence era. Mustapha was also a nationalist militant involved in the Algerian struggle against French colonial rule. Arrested during the Battle of Algiers , he was tortured and executed by the French army in 1957.

== Early life ==
Mustapha Ouaguenouni was born on 4 November 1924 in the Casbah of Algiers into a family known for its political activism during the Algerian War of Independence. Mustapha grew up in an environment strongly influenced by anti-colonial resistance and nationalist ideals. His brother Allel was also a player for USM Alger and a moudjahid during the Algerian War of Independence.

== Football career ==
Mustapha Ouaguenouni began his football career with MC Alger, the most prominent Muslim club in the city, where wearing the green and red colours symbolized pride and resistance. In 1944, Mustapha joined USM Alger, quickly becoming one of the key players in the squad. Mustapha played alongside figures such as Mustapha El Kamal, Saadi Yacef, and Hassen Zitouni. Mustapha also represented the corporate team of Randon, linked to the working class Basse Casbah district, and was known as a tough, uncompromising central defender.

== Nationalist activity and death ==
Alongside his football career, Ouaguenouni worked at the Bastos factory as a specialized worker. At the same time, he was deeply engaged in political activism, spreading nationalist awareness and encouraging resistance against colonial rule. On 2 August 1957, in the midst of the Battle of Algiers, he was arrested at his home (26 Ibrahim Fateh Street, Casbah) by French paratroopers. He was first taken to the Ben Aknoun interrogation centre and then transferred to the Leveilley detention camp, where he was subjected to severe torture. Shortly afterwards, he was executed by gunfire near his cell.

== Legacy ==
After Algeria’s independence, the municipal stadium on the heights of Algiers, formerly known as Stade Leclerc, was renamed Stade Mustapha Ouaguenouni. He is remembered as one of the Algerian athletes who sacrificed their lives for freedom and independence.

== Career statistics ==
Appearances and goals by club, season and competition
Club	Season	League			Cup		Total	
Club	Season	Division	Apps	Goals	Apps	Goals	Apps	Goals
USM Alger	1948–49	First Division	0	0	0	0	0	0
USM Alger	1949–50	First Division	0	0	3	0	3	0
USM Alger	1950–51	First Division	8	0	2	0	10	0
USM Alger	1951–52	First Division	6	0	2	0	8	0
USM Alger	1952–53	First Division	0	0	0	0	0	0
USM Alger	1953–54	First Division	7	2	1	0	8	2
USM Alger	1954–55	First Division	2	0	0	0	2	0
USM Alger	Total		23	2	8	0	31	2
Career total			23	2	8	0	31	2

== See also ==
- USM Alger
- MC Alger
- Algerian War
