= Zoubir Bouadjadj =

Algerian nationalist figure

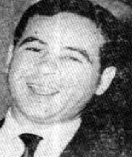
- Born: 4 October 1925; Clos-Salembier Algiers, French Algeria
- Died: 14 October 2014 (aged 89); Dely Ibrahim Algiers, Algeria
- Movement: Algerian People's Party (PPA); National Liberation Front (FLN)

Zoubir Bouadjadj (Arabic: زوبير بوعجاج; 4 October 1925 – 14 October 2014) was an Algerian nationalist activist during the Algerian War.

== Personal life ==
Zoubir Bouadjadj came from a very modest family in Algiers. His father died when he was three years old as a result of complications from his service during the First World War (having been exposed to Chemical weapons).

== Career ==
Bouadjadj joined the Algerian People's Party (PPA) in 1942. He was also active within the AML (Friends of the Manifesto and Liberty) led by Ferhat Abbas and took part in the demonstrations of May 8, 1945. He later joined the Revolutionary Committee of Unity and Action (CRUA) and became a member of the Group of 22, who met in a modest villa in Clos-Salembier belonging to Lyès Deriche, where they decided to launch the Algerian War on November 1, 1954. At the beginning of the Algerian War, Bouadjadj took command of five groups as a sector leader in Algiers. He was arrested on November 6, 1954, and sentenced to hard labor; he was released after the Évian Accords. After Algeria gained independence in 1962, Bouadjadj served as a member of the National Assembly, a member of the FLN Central Committee, and head of the FLN Federation of Greater Algiers.

== USM Alger ==
One of the veteran players of USM Alger looks back on his early footballing days, which began in 1939 in the youth category. At that time, he and his teammates went to a field in “Menghassan” to take a physical education test, and then continued the activity with swimming at the “Padovani” pool. Although the relationship between USM Alger and MC Alger was friendly, he did not join MC Alger because his brother played there. Instead, he preferred to watch their matches from the stands after finishing his own team’s games. He also briefly played for the Hydra team, and among his youth teammates were Aliouach, Mohamed Samghouni and Zaaf. His spell with USM Alger lasted until 1952, when he left shortly after the team failed to achieve promotion to the Honor Division in the 1951–52 season. According to those close to him, he played football out of passion and love for the sport, not for money, as he was in a comfortable financial situation and worked in another field unrelated to sports income.

Bouadjadj and his team had two attempts to secure promotion to the Honor Division, the first in 1948 and the second in 1952, but they failed both times due to poor preparation, lack of training, and frequent interference from club officials in choosing the starting lineup. Nevertheless, Bouadjadj was known for his commitment to training and his excellent physical condition, never tiring or losing focus no matter how strong the opponent. In contrast, most players at the time lacked sporting spirit and discipline in training, and many engaged in negative habits such as staying out late at night and smoking, as he recalled.

According to his recollections, the team’s meetings were held at Abdelrahmane Boulenjass’s café on Lallier Street. Throughout his career at USM Alger, Bouadjadj played in several positions on the pitch, including centre forward, right winger, midfielder, and defender. Coach Abderrahman Ibrir even played him once as a left winger. He got along well with most of his teammates, except for Allel Ouaguenouni, with whom he could not find any understanding due to his different temperament unlike his brother Mustapha, with whom he had a good relationship, according to his testimony.

== Career statistics ==
Appearances and goals by club, season and competition
Club	Season	League			Cup		Other		Total	
Club	Season	Division	Apps	Goals	Apps	Goals	Apps	Goals	Apps	Goals
USM Alger	1949–50	First Division	4	0	4	1	0	0	8	1
USM Alger	1950–51	First Division	8	1	1	0	0	0	9	1
USM Alger	1951–52	First Division	14	0	2	0	2	0	18	0
USM Alger	1952–53	First Division	5	0	0	0	0	0	5	0
USM Alger	1953–54	First Division	8	0	0	0	0	0	8	0
USM Alger	1954–55	First Division	0	0	0	0	0	0	0	0
USM Alger	Total		39	1	7	1	2	0	48	2
Career total			39	1	7	1	2	0	48	2
