= Hydra AC =

Algerian football club

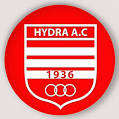
- Full name: Hydra Amal Chabab
- Nickname(s): l'Athlétic
- Founded: 1936 as Groupement Sportif d'Alger Hydra
- Ground: Ahmed Fellak Stadium
- Capacity: 4000
- League: Ligue Régional I
- 2023–24: Ligue Régional I, Alger, 11th
Home colours	Away colours

Hydra Athletic Club (Arabic: أمل حيدرة), known as Hydra AC or HAC for short, is an Algerian football club based in the Hydra neighbourhood of Algiers. The club was founded in 1936 and its colours are red and white. Their home stadium, Ahmed Fellak Stadium, has a capacity of 4,000 spectators. The club is currently playing in the Ligue Régional I.

== History ==
The club was founded in 1936 as Groupement Sportif d'Alger Hydra. In 1962, after the independence of Algeria, the name of the club was changed to Hydra AC by Ali Benfadah, a player at the club at the time, in reference to his former club, French club Le Havre AC which is known as Le HAC or just HAC for short.
