= Kouba, Algeria =

Coordinates: 36°44′01″N 3°05′11″E

Kouba
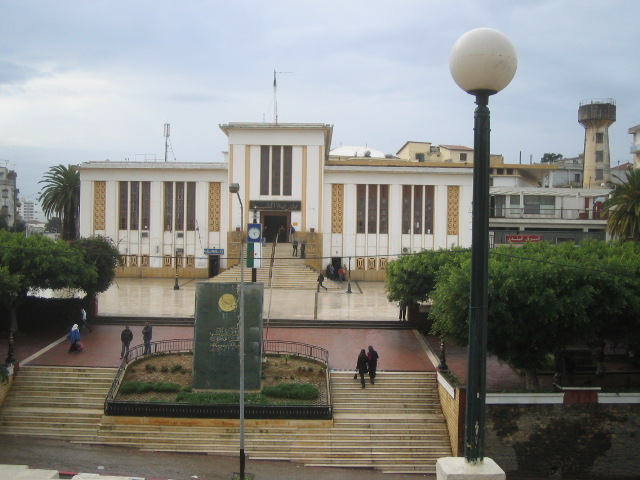
- Interactive map of Kouba
- Time zone: UTC+1 (West Africa Time)

Kouba is a suburb situated on a height just south-east of the central city of Algiers in northern Algeria. It is home to the Kouba city council, which was built during the French colonial times. Its name refers to "Qubba", which means "dome".

== Notable people ==
- Azzedine Bousseksou
- Brahim Boushaki
- Mohamed Missouri
