= Bab El Oued =

Bab El Oued باب الواد
- Commune
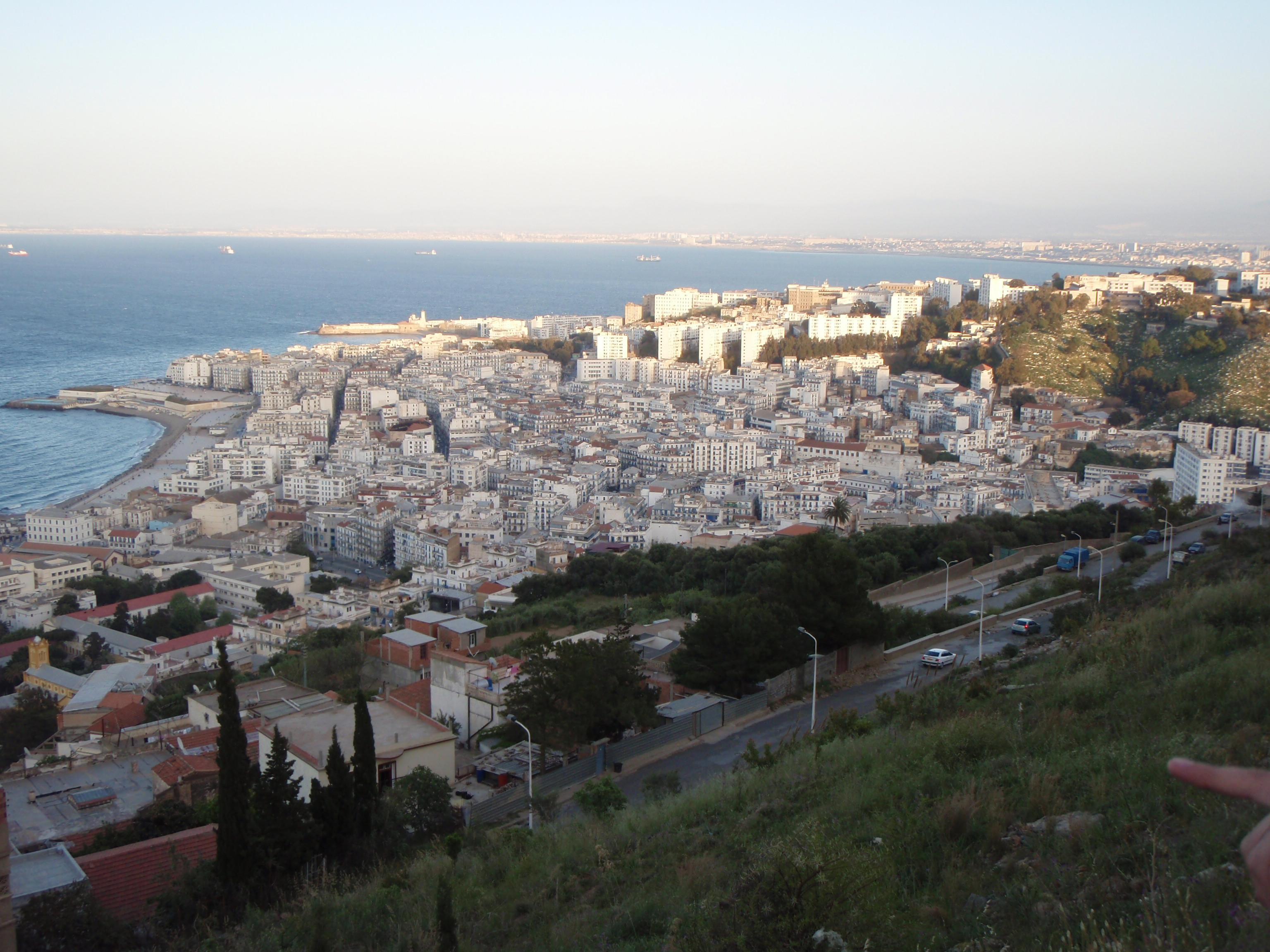
- Bab El Oued

- Location of Bab El Oued in the Algiers Province

- Location of Bab El Oued in the Algeria
- Coordinates: 36°47′26.53″N 3°2′59.03″E
- Country: Algeria
- Province: Algiers Province
- District: Bab El Oued District
- APC: 2012-2017

Government
  - Type: Municipality
  - Mayor: Athmane Sahbane

Area
  - Total: 43 sq mi (111 km^{2})

Population (2014)
  - Total: 214,900
  - Density: 149,000/sq mi (57,700/km^{2})
- Time zone: UTC+1 (CET)
- Postal code: 16007
- ISO 3166 code: CP

Bab El Oued is a neighbourhood in Algiers, the capital of Algeria, along the coast north of the city centre. As of 2008, the population of the commune of Bab El Oued was 64,732.

== History ==
During the existence of French Algeria, Bab El Oued was established as the main neighbourhood of poor pied-noirs, including many poor fishermen. Towards the end of the Algerian War, the neighbourhood became the stronghold of the Organisation armée secrète, until OAS attacks on the French Army led them to assault and purge the neighbourhood, during the siege of Bab el Oued in March 1962. Soon after, Algeria became independent, and the pied noir population fled the country. The neighbourhood was then settled by Muslim Algerians. The neighbourhood again gained notoriety during the leadup to the Algerian Civil War (which broke out in 1991) as a stronghold of the Islamic Salvation Front, or FIS. Its population in 1998 was 102,200.

== Shrine ==
Located beyond the Bab al-Oued, on a hillside, is the tomb of 'Abd al-Rahman al-Tha'alibi (1383-1470), a revered scholar and mystic known as the patron saint of Algiers.

== Notable people ==
- Sofia Boutella
- Dida Diafat
- Djamel Keddou
- Baya Rahouli
- Abdul Abdullah Yahia
- Abd al-Rahman al-Tha'alibi is buried here
- Souad Massi
- Mohamed Tadjadit
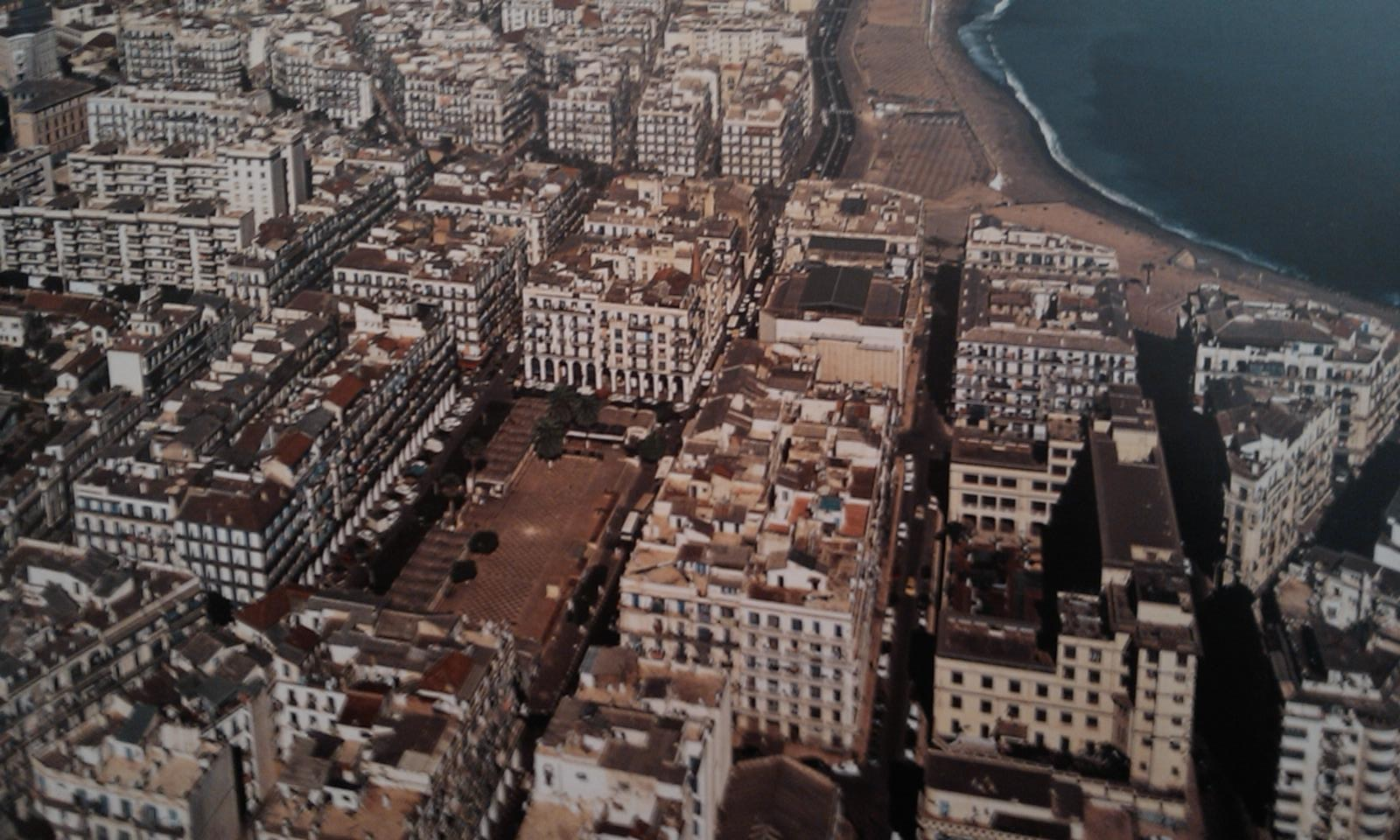

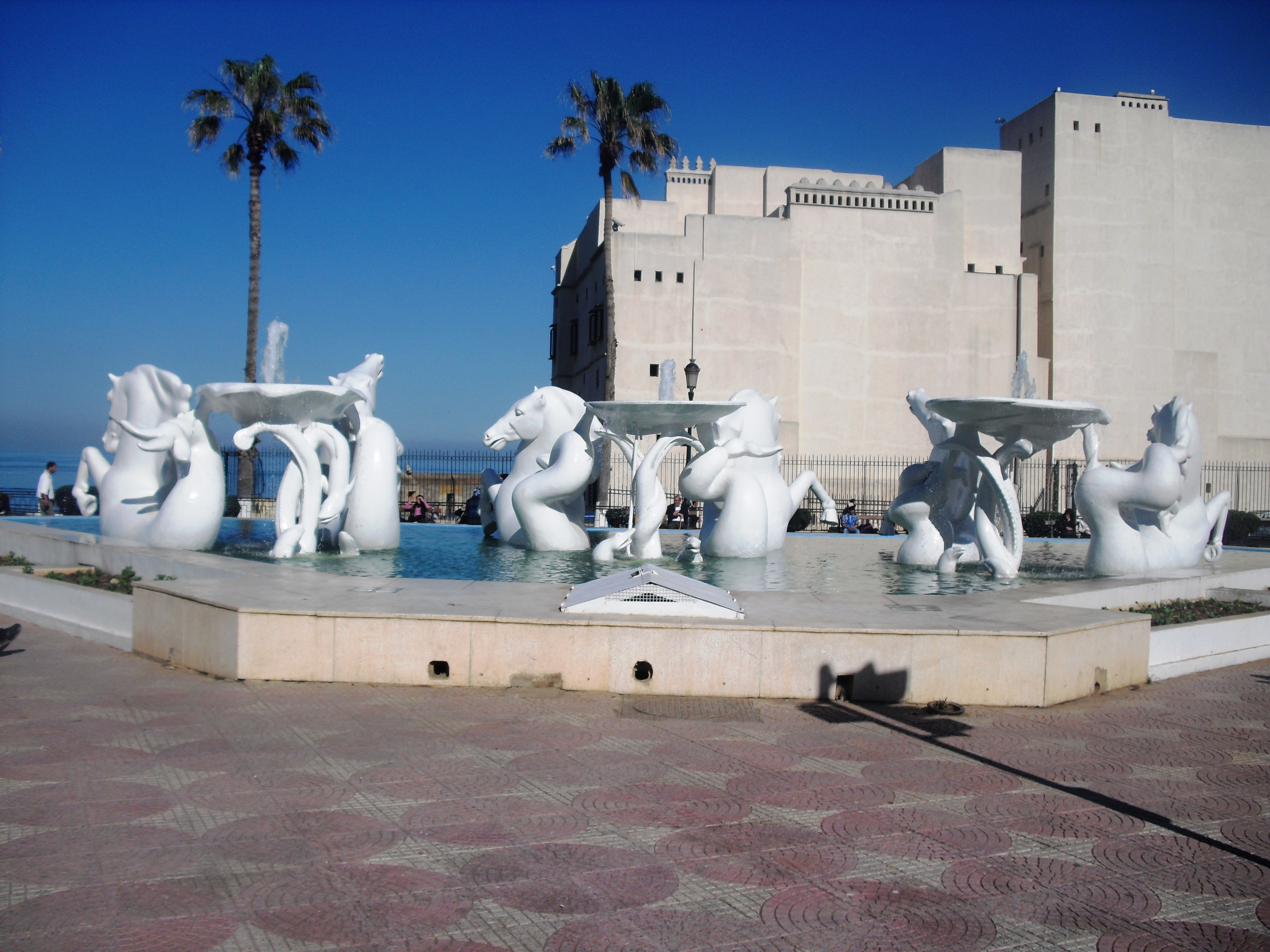
