= Saadi Yacef =

Algerian independence fighter

Saâdi Yacef
- سعدي ياسف
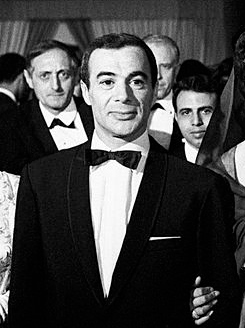
- Yacef at the 1966 Venice Film Festival

Member of the Council of the Nation
- In office 6 January 2001 – 10 January 2016

Member of the Constituent National Assembly
- In office 25 September 1962 – 20 September 1964

Personal details
- Born: 20 January 1928 Algiers, French Algeria
- Died: 10 September 2021 (aged 93) Algiers, Algeria
- Resting place: El Kettar cemetery in Algiers
- Spouse: Baya Boudjema (m.1965)
- Children: Zaphira, Salima, Saida, Omar and Amin
- Military career
- Allegiance: FLN
- Branch: ALN
- Service years: 1954–1962
- Rank: FLN military chief of the Zone Autonome d'Alger
- Conflicts: Algerian War; Battle of Algiers
- Other work: Author, film producer, actor, baker, politician

Saâdi Yacef (Arabic: ياسف سعدي, romanized: Yāsaf Saʿadī; 20 January 1928 – 10 September 2021) was an Algerian revolutionary, politician and actor. A prominent figure during the Algerian War, he served as a leader of the National Liberation Front. He was a Senator in Algeria's Council of the Nation until his death.

== Biography ==
Yacef was born in Algiers. He was born in the bustling Casbah district of Algiers on 20 January 1928, to illiterate ethnic Berber parents. His parents spoke Berber rather than French or Arabic. The son of parents from the Algerian region of Kabylia, he started his working life at age of 14 as an apprentice baker. In 1945, at age of 17, he joined the Parti du Peuple Algérien, a nationalist party which the French authorities soon outlawed, after which it was reconstituted as the Mouvement pour le Triomphe des Libertes Democratiques (MTLD). From 1947 to 1949, Yacef served in the MTLD's paramilitary wing, the Organisation Secrete. After the OS was broken up, Yacef moved to France and lived there until 1952, when he returned to Algeria to work again as a baker.

Yacef joined the FLN at the start of the Algerian War in 1954. By May 1956, he was the FLN's military chief of the Zone Autonome d'Alger (Autonomous Zone of Algiers), making him one of the leaders on the Algerian side in the Battle of Algiers. He was captured by French troops on 24 September 1957 and eventually sentenced to death. General Paul Aussaresses later asserted that while in custody, Yacef betrayed the FLN and the Algerian cause by providing the French army with the location of Ali la Pointe, another leading FLN commander. Yacef denied it, and historian Darius Rejali considers the accusation as highly suspect. He was ultimately pardoned by the French government after Charles de Gaulle's 1958 return to power.

“The Battle of Algiers” movie, and Mr. Yacef’s 1962 memoir, Souvenirs de la Bataille d’Alger, which he had dictated to a friend in prison because he was barely literate, became a major influence on later guerrilla movements . After the Algerian War, Yacef helped produce Italian filmmaker Gillo Pontecorvo's film The Battle of Algiers (1966), based on Souvenirs de la Bataille d'Alger. Yacef played a character modeled on his own experiences (named as Djafar) in the battle.

Yacef died on 10 September 2021, aged 93, in Algiers. His daughter Zaphira Yacef stated that he had been suffering from heart problems before his death.

== Quotations ==
•"I'm convinced that a battle of ideas is not enough. It's necessary to lead the armed struggle to the end."

•"We had nothing, we had to break the wall of fear. But when you have the people behind you, nothing can stop you."

•"It’s hard to start a revolution. Even harder to continue it. And hardest of all to win it. But, it’s only afterward, when we have won, that the true difficulties begin.”

•"Initially, we were just a few, but gradually, others rallied to our cause. The elderly, the young, women – they all united, recognizing the urgency. It's akin to a dormant warhorse, tranquil until stirred into action by a compelling trigger."

•"I will do whatever I can to help my country until my death. At the Senate I try to devise laws that fit in with the way people live, and I give my opinion. And I will always do this, even if I leave the Senate. I will always try and be useful."

== See also ==
- Zohra Drif
