= Stade Mohamed Ferhani =

Stadium in Bab El Oued, Algiers, Algeria

- Stade Ferhani
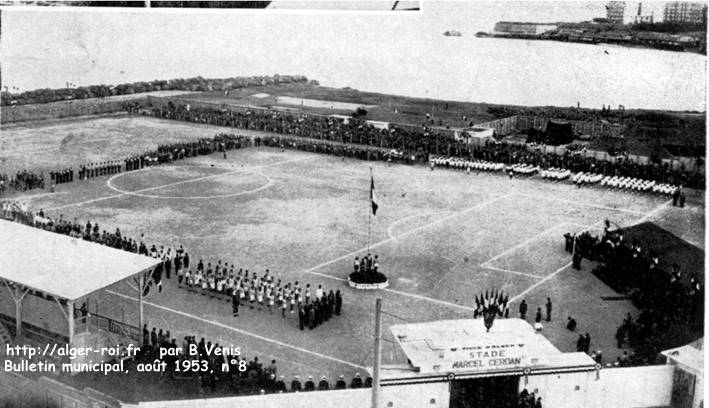
- Marcel Cerdan Stadium in 1953.
- Interactive map of Stade Mohamed Ferhani
- Full name: Stade Mohamed Ferhani
- Former names: Stade Marcel Cerdan (1950–1962)
- Location: Bab El Oued, Algiers, Algeria
- Coordinates: 36.790703°N 3.049731°E
- Operator: APC Bab El Oued
- Capacity: 3,800
- Surface: Artificial turf
- Field size: 100 m × 68 m

Construction
- Opened: 1950
- Renovated: 1999

Tenant
- Espérance de Bab El Oued

Mohamed Ferhani Stadium (Arabic: ملعب محمد فرحاني) is a multi-purpose stadium in Bab El Oued, Algiers, Algeria. It is currently used mostly for football matches and is the home ground of Espérance de Bab El Oued. The stadium has a capacity of 3,800 people.

== History ==
Bab El Oued equipped itself with a municipal stadium in 1950. This stadium took the name of Marcel Cerdan. A bust in his honor is also inaugurated at the entrance to the stadium. The stadium welcomes the teams of Sporting Club Algérois as well as the premises of Bab el Oued Athletic Sport and USM Alger. Apart from football the venue hosts boxing matches or wrestling galas. A basketball court is also set up there. The pitch still exists today, its metal structures have been replaced by hard stands.
