= Reghaïa Valley =

River valley in Algeria

Reghaia Valley
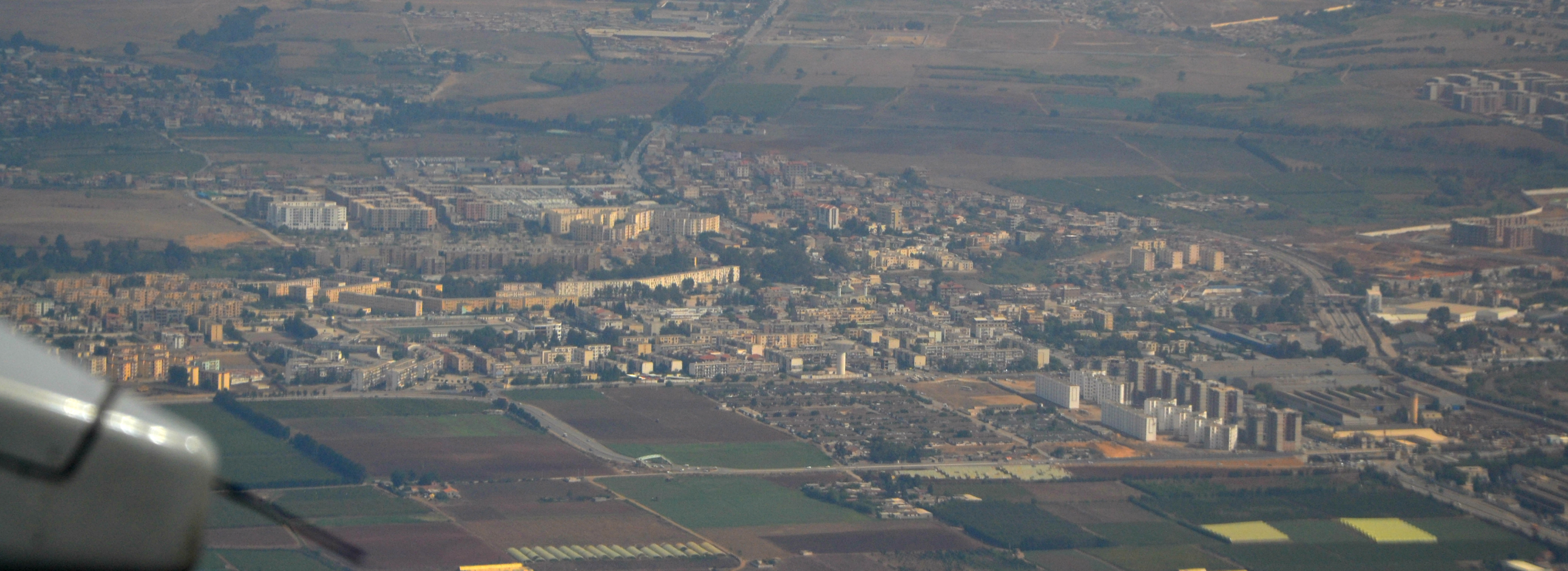

Location
- Country: Algeria

Physical characteristics
- Source: Tell Atlas, Khachna, Boumerdès Province
  - coordinates: 36.6610778°N 3.4058266°E
  - length: Boumerdès Province, Bouzegza Keddara, 500 Meter
- 2nd source: Tell Atlas, Khachna, Boumerdès Province
  - coordinates: 36.6756751°N 3.3311396°E
  - length: Boumerdès Province, Khemis El-Khechna, 472 Meter
- Source confluence: Algiers Province,36.738238°N 3.3456504°E
  - elevation: Reghaïa, 72 Meter
- Basin size: Drainage basin, 88 km^{2} (34 sq mi)

Basin features
- Landmarks: {[Flag|Algeria}} Boumerdès Province Bouzegza Keddara, El Kharrouba, Ouled Moussa, Khemis El-Khechna, Ouled Hedadj Algiers Province Reghaïa, H'raoua

Reghaïa Valley is one of the rivers in the province of Algiers, stretching 17.13 kilometers to the east of the Algerian capital. Its mouth is located between the municipalities of Reghaïa and H'raoua. It is among the longest and most water-abundant rivers in the Algiers region. The river originates in the Tell Atlas and the Khachna Mountains, near the municipality of Kedara in the Boumerdes province, flowing through Algiers before draining into Lake Reghaïa near the Réghaïa forest, and eventually emptying into the Mediterranean Sea.

== Description ==
The spring of Reghaïa Valley is located at Ben Ammar Valley in the municipality of Bouzegza Keddara, within the Khachna Mountains, at an elevation of 500 meters above sea level. The river is part of the Mediterranean basin.

The course of Oued Reghaïa flows naturally downhill towards Réghaïa lake, where it branches off within the municipality of Reghaïa, forming three tributaries:

1. Al-Abyar Valley
2. Qasabya valley
3. Gaqen Valley

Reghaïa Valley serves as a natural boundary between the municipalities of Reghaïa and H'raoua, creating an outlet through a drainage basin that covers an area of approximately 75 to 88 square kilometers and has a perimeter of around 42 kilometers.

== Geology ==
Reghaïa Valley site is located at the eastern geological boundary of the Mitidja syncline, a region formed by the emergence of elevations resulting from tectonic movements that brought volcanic rocks and smooth stones from the Tell Atlas, spreading across the entire Mitidja plain.

The coastal areas along the Mediterranean Sea feature a series of raised surfaces created by the withdrawal of seawater, leaving behind cohesive landforms.

The northern banks of the Reghaïa Valley exhibit a steep gradient. During the Pliocene epoch, erosion occurred along the riverbanks, leading to the formation of blue deposition rocks during the piacenzian stage.

The sediments within the stream bed of the Reghaïa Valley are composed of fine gray sand, gravel, and pebble, with a thickness of several meters.

== Main source ==
Reghaïa Valley originates in the western part of the Bouzegza Keddara municipality within Boumerdes Province, approximately 14.34 kilometers (8.91 miles) in a straight line from its mouth at the Mediterranean Sea along the coast of Algiers Province. This source is situated within the Tell and Khachna Mountains, which lie between the provinces of Médéa, Bouira, Blida, and Boumerdes.

== The path ==
Reghaïa Valley runs through two coastal Algerian states.

States and Municipalities in the "Valley Hmeiz" path
Number	Boumerdès Province	Algiers Province
01	Bouzegza Keddara	Reghaïa
02	El Kharrouba	H'raoua
03	Ouled Moussa	
04	Khemis El-Khechna	
04	Ouled Hedadj	

== Water bodies ==
The Reghaïa Valley intersects with several water bodies as it flows through the provinces of Algiers and Boumerdes in Algeria.

Water bodies in the "Raghaya Valley" path
Number	Boumerdès Province	Algiers Province
01	Keddara Dam	Réghaïa lake
01	36.6460971°N 3.4267111°E	36.7695421°N 3.3361168°E

== National roads ==
Reghaïa Valley crosses several national roads as it traverses through the provinces of Algiers and Boumerdes in Algeria.

National roads in the path of "Raghaya valley"
Number	Boumerdès Province	Algiers Province
01	National Road 29	National Road 5
02	National Road 5	National Road No. 11
03	National Road No. 11	National Road No. 24

== Train stations ==
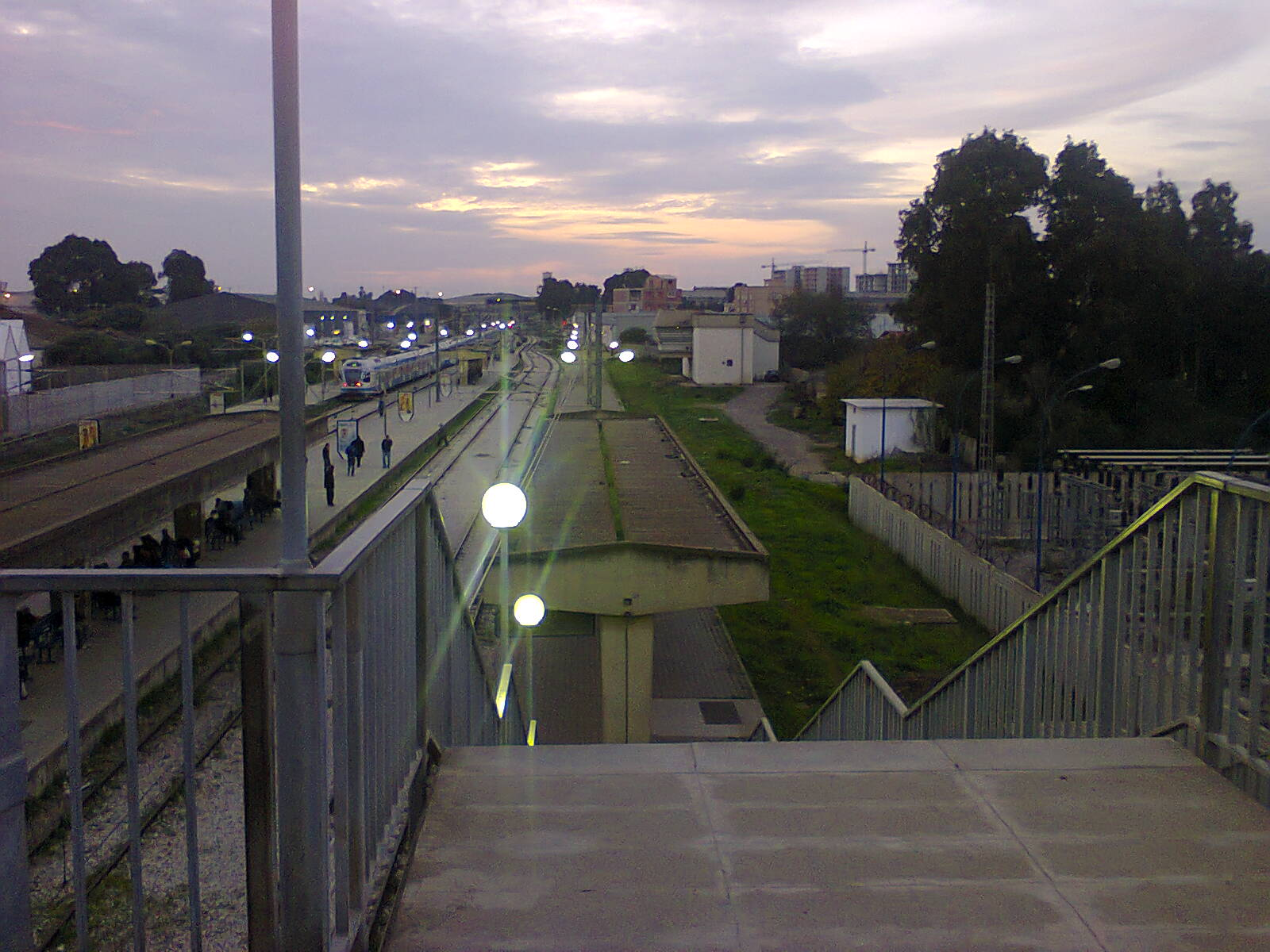
Réghaïa station

Reghaïa Valley intersects with several train stations as it flows through the region of Algiers and Boumerdes in Algeria.

Train stations on the Raghaya Valley route
Number	Boumerdès Province	Algiers Province
01	Boudouaou station 36.7406704°N 3.4128289°E	Réghaïa station 36.7351671°N 3.3416382°E

== River mouth ==
The mouth of the Reghaïa Valley is situated between the municipalities of Reghaïa and H'raoua in Algiers Province, near the "Soumam" neighborhood. The Valley serves as a boundary separating these two municipalities until it flows into the Mediterranean Sea along the coast of Algiers Province.

== River mouth location ==
The mouth of the Reghaïa Valley is located between the municipalities of Reghaïa and H'raoua, in proximity to the confluences of the Buduau Valley and El-Hamiz valley. This picturesque site lies east of the El-Harrach Valley mouth and Sablons beach, making it a strategically location near the railway line connecting El-Harrach to Reghaïa. The mouth of the Reghaïa Valley is approximately 26 kilometers east of the Casbah of Algiers and overlooks the Mediterranean Sea.

== Pollution ==
Reghaïa Valley is noted for pollution in its waters, particularly from dichlorodiphenyltrichloroethane (DDT), which has been detected at a concentration of 1,600 picograms per liter in marine sediments at the river's mouth. In addition to DDT, low concentrations of other chlorinated organic, insecticides, including lindane, heptachlor, aldrin, dieldrin, and endosulfan, have also been identified in the river. Measurements taken in 2004 indicated oxygen concentration values in the Reghaïa River that reflected minimum pollution thresholds, with a recorded level of 7 milligrams per liter at the riverbed. Moreover, the random dispersion of nitrates within the watercourse has led to an increased average concentration of 1.94 micrograms per liter.

== Neighboring bodies ==
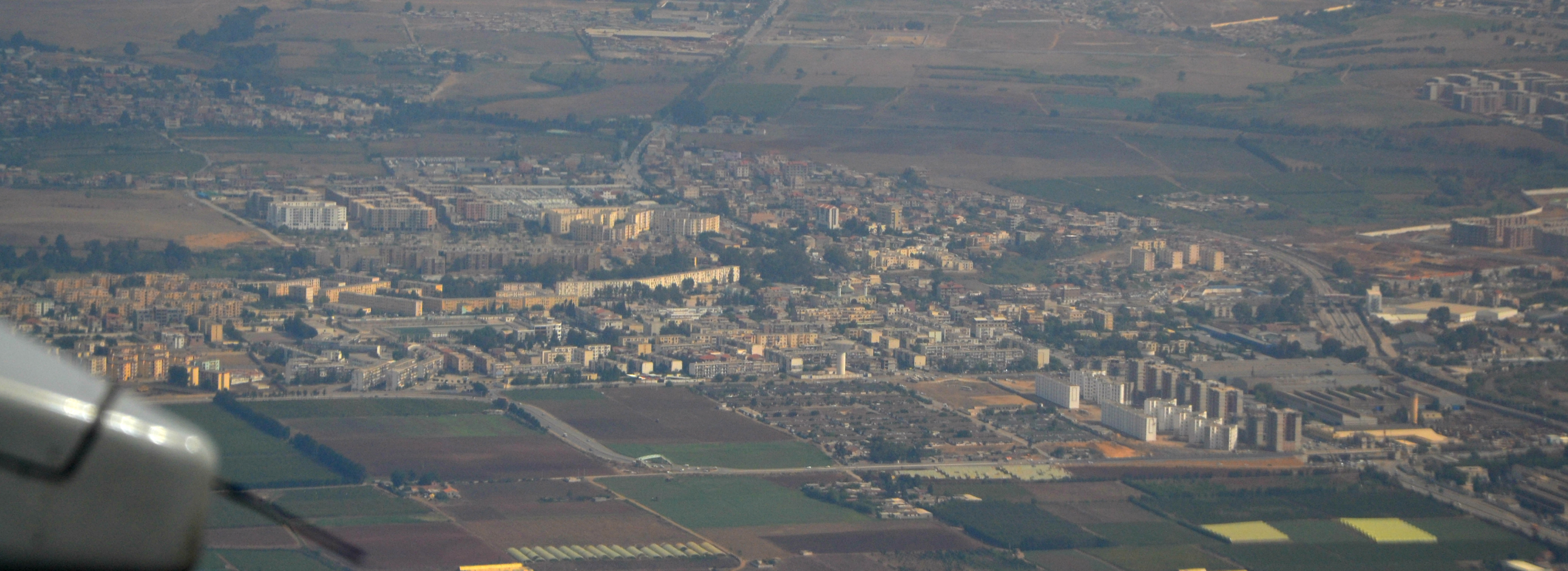
Drainage basin, Reghaia valley

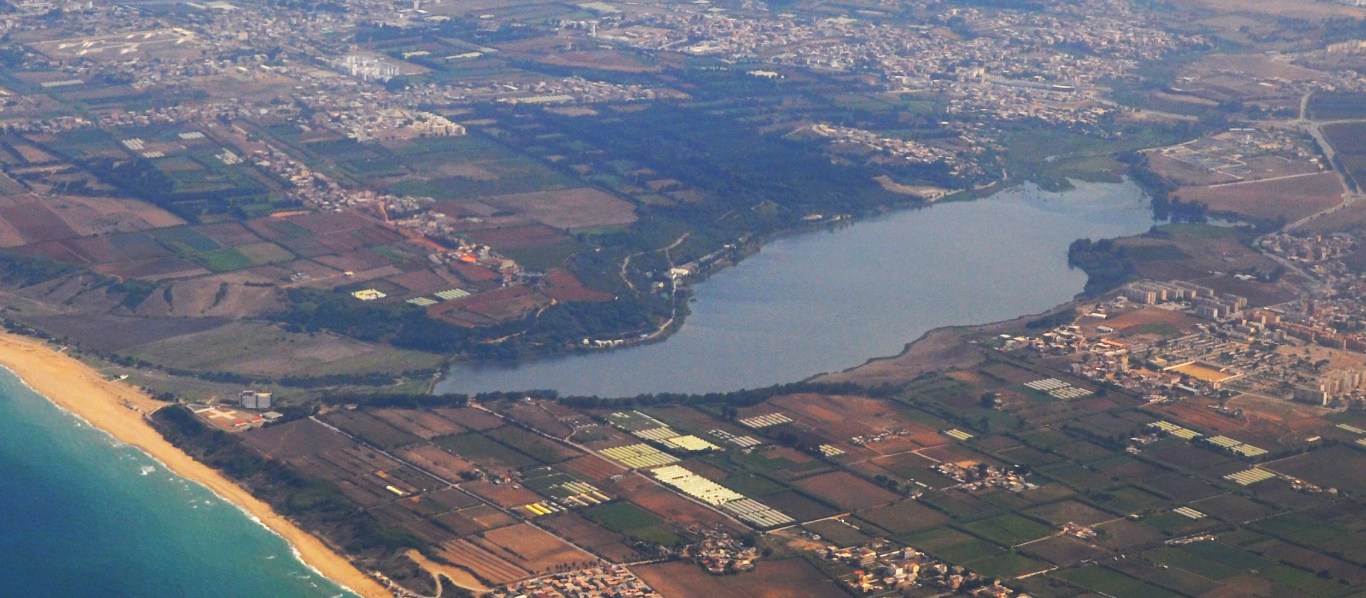
Réghaïa lake

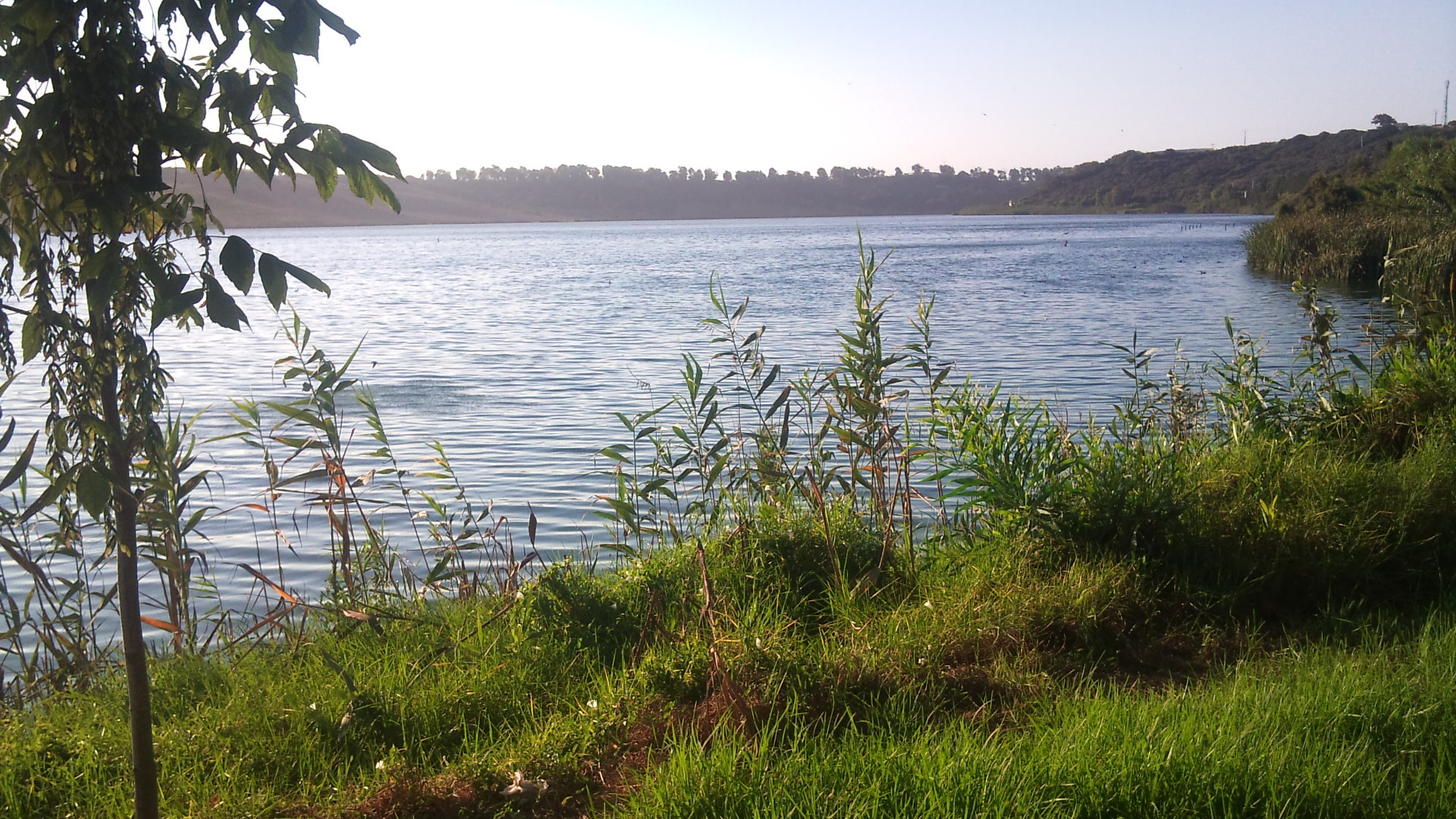
Réghaïa lake

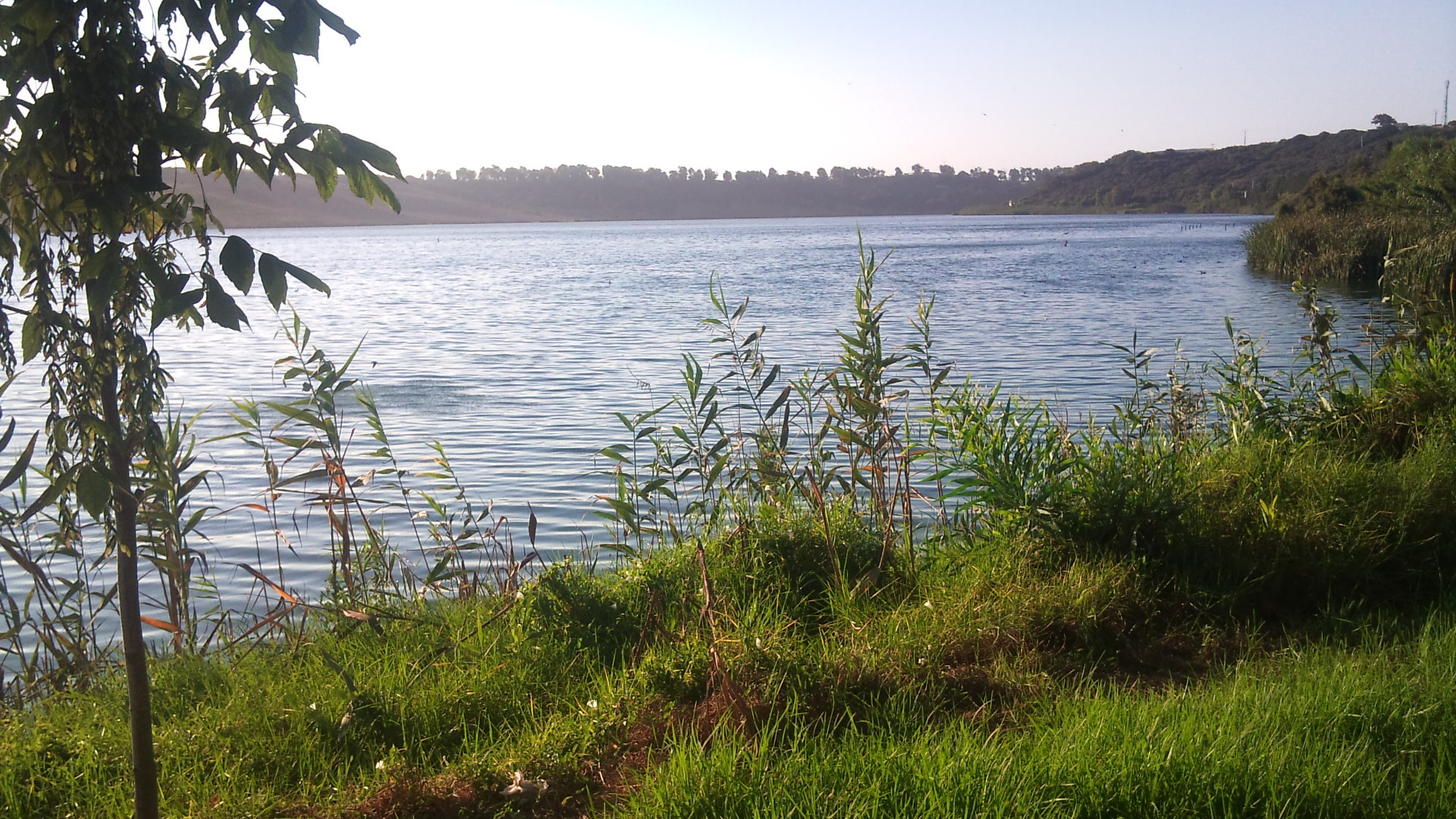
Réghaïa lake

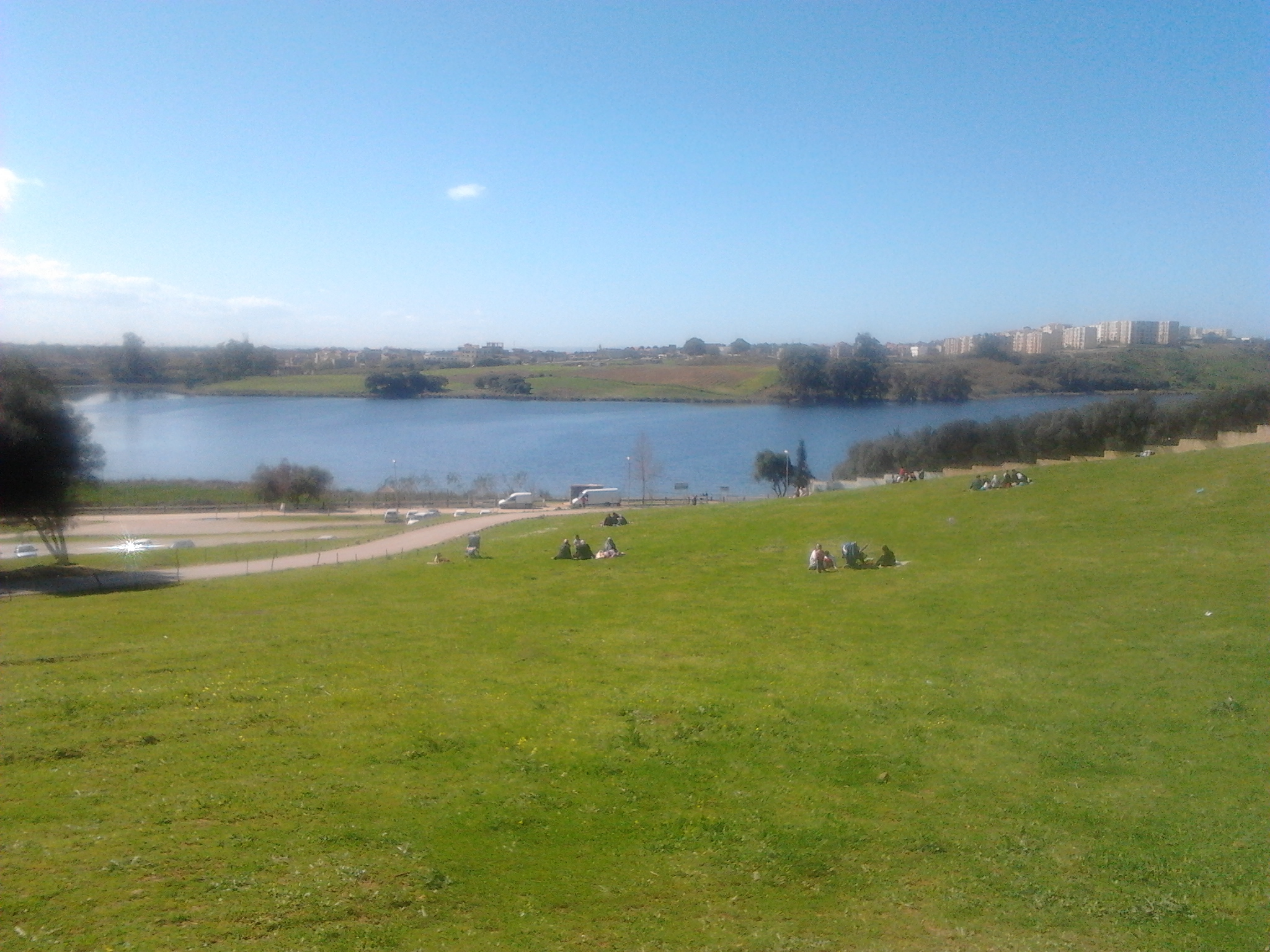
Aerial photography, Reghaia lake

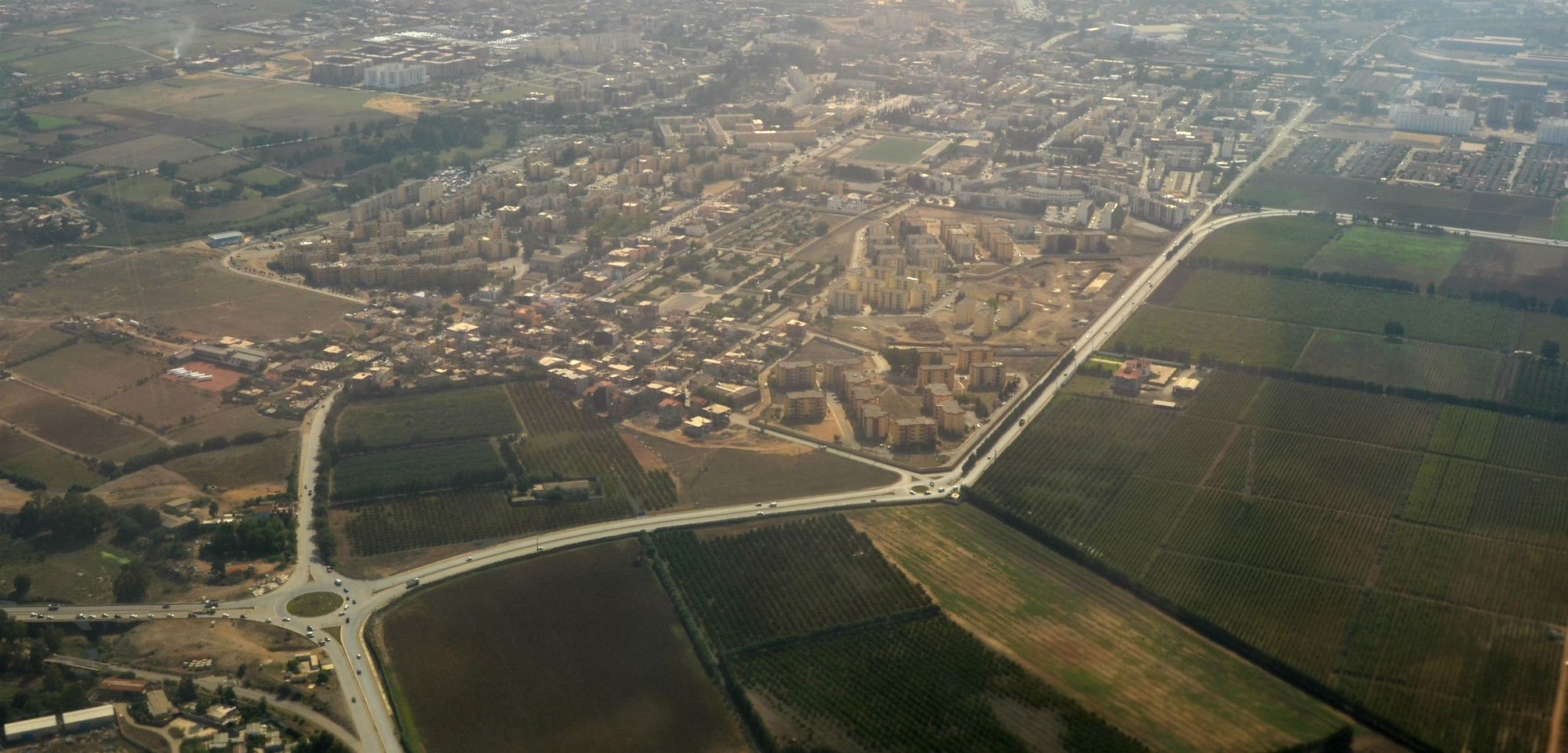
National Road No. 5 (Algiers)

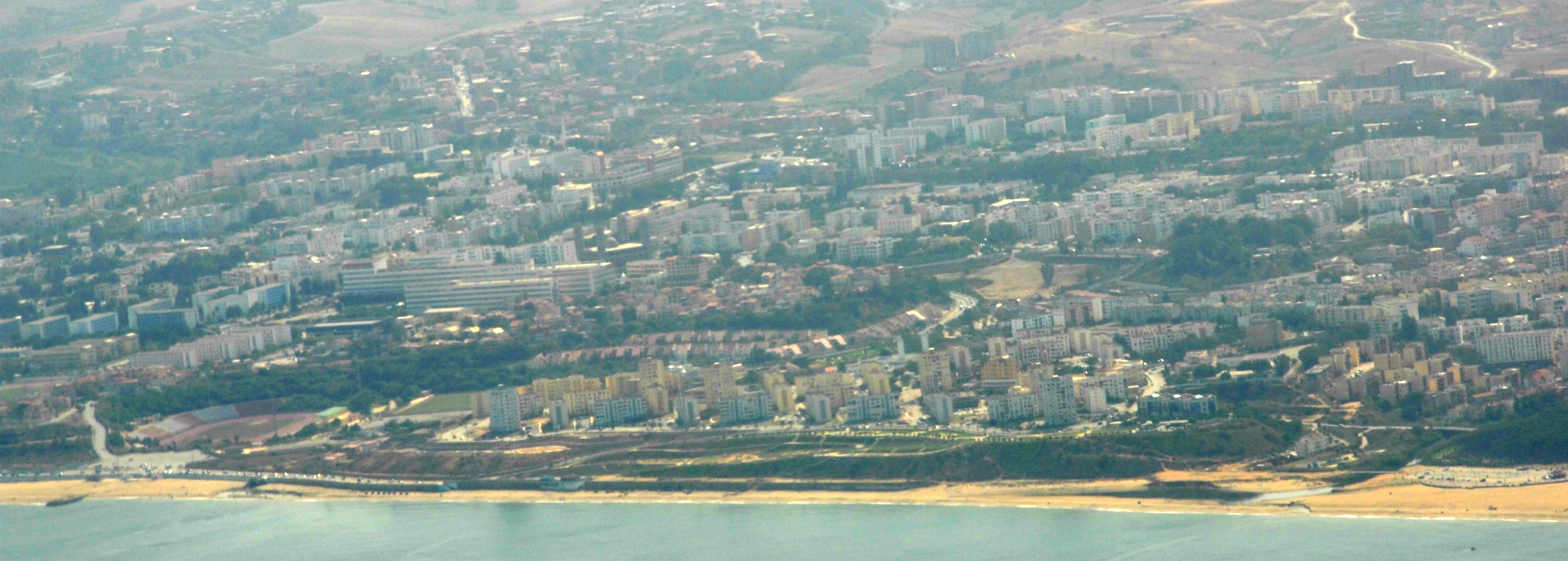
National Road 24 (Algiers)

== See also ==
=== Related topics ===
- List of rivers of Algeria
- Al-Hamiz Valley
- Ministry of Water Resources and Environment
- Discharge regime
- Tell Atlas
- Khachna
- Mitidja
- Kabylia
- Igawawen
- Algiers Province
- Boumerdès Province
- Boudouaou Valley
- Réghaïa forest
- Réghaïa lake
- List of beaches
- Tourism in Algeria
- Lists of tourist attractions
