= Khemis El Khechna District =

Coordinates: 36°39′00″N 3°19′50″E

Khemis El Khachna District دائرة خميس الخشنة
- District
- Map of Algeria highlighting Boumerdès Province

- Map of Boumerdès Province highlighting Khemis El Khechna District
- Country: Algeria
- Province: Boumerdès
- District seat: Khemis El Khechna

Population (1998)
  - Total: 128,444
- Time zone: UTC+01 (CET)
- Municipalities: 4

Khemis El Khachna is a district in Boumerdès Province, Algeria. It is the most populous district in the province. It was named after its capital, Khemis El Khechna, which is also the most populous municipality in the province. It is 30km away from the Boumerdese capital. Prior to 1974 it was known as Fondouk.

It was founded in 1845 by order of L. Philip. Its first mayor was named Raboil.

It is considered one of Algeria's richest regions, with a strong fishing industry.

== Municipalities ==
The district is further divided into 4 municipalities:

- Khemis El Khechna
- Ouled Moussa
- Larbatache
- Hammedi

== Notable people ==
- Lamine Abid, Algerian footballer.
- Mohamed Cherak, Algerian journalist.
- Mohamed Hassaïne, Algerian journalist.
- Othmane Senadjki, Algerian journalist.
