= Rouïba =

Rouiba الرويبة
- The Municipality of Rouiba
- Coat of arms
- Nickname: La Petite Suisse
- Location of Rouiba within Algiers Province

- Location of Rouiba within Algeria
- Coordinates: 36°44′N 3°17′E
- Country: Algeria
- Province: Algiers
- District: Rouïba

Area
  - Total: 4,109 km^{2} (1,586 sq mi)
- Elevation: 20 m (66 ft)

Population (2008)
  - Total: 61,984
  - Density: 15.08/km^{2} (39.07/sq mi)
- Time zone: UTC+01 (CET)
- Postal code: 16012
- ONS code: 1642

Rouïba or Rouiba (Arabic: الرويبة) is a municipality of Algeria. It is located 22 kilometres (14 mi) in the eastern suburbs of Algiers in one of the most healthy localities of Algeria. It is also the district seat of Rouïba District in Algiers Province. Its inhabitants are called Rouibéens.

Capital of Oriental Mitidja, of agricultural vocation, Rouïba became an industrial city after the Second World War, with its territory being the first and the largest industrial area of the country which extends on 1,000 hectares (2,471 acres), which makes it is one of the richest communes in Algeria.

== Geography ==
=== Toponymy ===
Rouïba is the name used by the inhabitants before and after the French colonization. "What is incontrovertible is that its origin comes from the Arab or the Berber; as for its translation the opinions diverge". The origin could be a deformation of "Small wood":

- Gustave Léon Niox defines:Rouiba diminutive of Raba ( Ghaba ), small wood.
- Élisée Reclus defines:Ghaba, wood.- Diminutive: Ghouiba . Ex: Rouiba (suburb of Algiers), le Bosquet (lambert).

=== Location ===
Rouïba is located about 22 kilometres (14 mi) east of Algiers.

=== Topography ===
The municipality of Rouiba is entirely within the Plain of Mitidja. It borders neither the sea, nor the Atlas. The altitudes are all very low, of the order of 20 m, and even less than 10 m near the El Biar River which limits the town to the east. Everything is flat, with the small exception of Haraoua ride in the far north, which reaches 50 m. In the Western part, the tight meanders of El Hamiz River emphasize the low slope of the river and flood risk, at least before the construction of the dam opened on the mountain in 1883 which has regularized the flow.

=== Hydrography ===
The municipality is crossed by three wadis:

- El Biar wadi: originates around the Rouïba-Réghaïa industrial zone and feeds Lake of Réghaïa through the commune of Heraoua. It limits the municipality to the East.
- Bouriah wadi: tributary of the Oued El Hamiz. It rises at the level of Rouïba and drains runoff from the Mitidja North-East.
- El Hamiz wadi: which limits the commune to the West.

=== Geology and relief ===
Rouiba is located in the eastern end of the Mitidja Plain, which is a zone of continuous subsidence, which has given rise to an active sedimentation whose elements come from the reliefs of Atlas of Blida. At the end of the Pliocene and the Quaternary periods, two aquifer reservoirs became individualized. It is the Astien formed by limestones and sandstones of continental origin. The alluvial quaternary consists essentially of pebbles and gravel. These two reservoirs are separated throughout the plain by semi-permeable yellow marls of the El Harrach formation (Villafranchien) except at the Rouiba pocket where the two aquifers are in contact. These two aquifers rest on an impermeable substratum, generally constituted by the gray and blue marls of the Piacenzian.

=== Routes of Communication and Transport ===
==== Roadways ====
National Roads

- Algeria East–West Highway : Two branches of the east–west highway join Rouïba, a first at the El Hamiz interchange and the second at the industrial zone.
- Rocade Sud d'Alger : Rouiba is connected with the Rocade Sud d'Alger.
- RN5 : Rouiba is crossed by the RN5 connecting it to the locality of El Hamiz in the municipality of Dar El Beida in the West and the municipality of Reghaïa to the East.
- RN11: road of Oran.
- RN24 : Rouiba is bordered on the north by the RN24 which limits it with the municipality of Ain Taya.

Ways of Wilaya

- CW121 : Rouïba is crossed by the CW121 which connects Ain Taya in the North to Khemis El Khechna in the South.
- CW149: Rouïba is crossed by the CW149 which connects Bordj El Bahri to the North to Hammedi in the South.

==== Public transport ====
Algiers Suburban Network, Line Algiers-Thénia:
Rouïba station is served by the SNTF suburban train, the frequency is one train every 15 minutes at rush hour.
Two other stations serve the industrial zone of Rouïba and SNVI.
ETUSA bus network:
The city of Rouïba is served by line 72 of ETUSA bus network, from Rouïba to Place du 8 mai 1945 Martyrs' Square . Subway:
The Algiers Metro Company (EMA) had consulted foreign consulting firms to make proposals on the extension of the Algiers metro from Bab Ezzouar to Dar El Beida, Rouïba and Reghaia.
Tram:
The extension of the tram line from Algiers to Ain Taya, Rouïba and Reghaïa is under study.
Bus Stations There are three major bus stations that cover several destinations:

Station	Localisation	Destinations
1	Boulevard Larbi-Khaled	Place 1er mai 1945, place des Martyrs, Bab El oued.; El Harrach, Bomati; Ain Taya; H'raoua; Dergana, café Chergui; Tafoura, Alger
2	Boulevard 1^{er} novembre	Industrial Zone of Rouiba; Réghaia, Boudouaou et Boumerdes; Bordj Menaïel; Bouïra; Tizi Ouzou; Bejaïa (in the morning)
3	Boulevard Colonel Amirouche (in its south part of the city)	Sbaat, Benchoubane; Hammedi; Khemis El Khechna

== Urban planning ==
=== Demographic dynamics ===
The coastline of Algiers region is experiencing a remarkable demographic dynamic, in its eastern periphery - composed of the set Sahel-Mitidja- accompanied by an important development of the built environment, following the saturation of the urban fabric of Algiers, linked to the topographical constraint of its port site, on the foothills of the old massif of Bouzaréah. The Algerian context during the period 1966-1977 is characterized by a high average annual growth rate (AAGR) of the wilaya of Algiers which reflects the extent of the rural exodus. Outside the intercensal period of 1966 to 1977, the central communes (hyper-center and city center) are characterized from the period 1977-1987 by negative AAGRs linked to the decrease of their population. The communes of Rouiba and Réghaia, as well as the wilaya of Algiers and the national territory preserve positive AAGR. The negative rates in the central communes and positive in Rouiba District communes reflect a correlation between these spatial entities, residing in the transfer of the population from the central districts to those of the periphery, notably the Eastern ones since 1987.

=== Urban morphology ===
At the arrival of the French colonizers, there was Haouch Rouïba, Haouch Sbaat and Haouch ben Choubane less than 2 km from the road from Algiers to Dellys.

In 1830, there was only the road from Dellys to Algiers and Rouïba was accessed by the path that passes the Muslim cemetery (El Guedhia) at the junction of the road of Fondouk (Khemis El-Khechna).

By 1842, some concessions of 100 hectares (247 acres) to 150 hectares (371 acres) had been offered or sold to Europeans and this territory was integrated into the commune of Rassauta in 1846. In 1852, eight farms existed.

On the August 11th, 1853, under Napoleon III, the Council of the Government studies the project of foundation of a population center, on the road of Algiers to Dellys, at the junction of the road of Ain Taya, where the Engineering military had just commissioned an artesian well.

On October 31, 1853, the decree of creation was published of the population center named Rouïba, composed of 22 feux on a territory of 385 hectares (951 acres).

On August 22, 1861, Rouïba became a commune of full exercise. In 1872, the last modifications of the boundaries of the commune of Rouïba which extended on 5,153 hectares (12,733 acres) and had a population of 440 Europeans and 1084 Muslims took place.

- In 1869, the town hall was constructed.
- In 1876, the church was erected and its construction was entirely financed by European families.
- From 1887, Rouïba had its communal school. Originally, it consisted of three nursery classes, twenty primary classes and eight high school classes.
- In 1900, the covered market was constructed, which also served as a hall and sports hall. It was demolished in 1926 when the party hall was finished.
- In 1906, the post office was erected.
- As early as 1930, a public garden with an area of 10 hectares (25 acres) was built.
- Since 1954, Rouïba has a health center reserved for the most deprived.
- In 1956, it was an evolving city of 60 apartments reserved for Muslims which were born.
- In April 1957, the first villas of the subdivision 'Les Castors of the A.I.A were finished. The subdivision is located near the old water tower; this neighborhood has become very residential today.
- The village is expanding, an industrial activity develops in the fields of brickworks, transport, construction of plows and agricultural equipment, the paint factory and lighting equipment; at the same time, 24 low-rent apartments came to alleviate the housing crisis Rouíba was experiencing.
- The realization of the Rouïba-Reghaia industrial zone, whose Berliet factories were the flagship, also welcomed the La Gauloise breweries, public works companies, steel pipe factories and concrete pipe manufacturing plants, which allowed the construction of several subdivisions. To do this a new neighborhood is created; several condominiums of 2 and 4 floors with shops on the ground floor were born as well as new H.L.M (Moderate Rent Housing).
- At the beginning of 1962, a hospital of 100 beds was completed. It will be requisitioned by the army that will make it a detention center for prisoners O.A.S
- In 1959, 2 ZUP (Zones to be urbanized in priority) are created on the territory of Algeria, in the city of Algiers: Annassers and Rouiba-Reghaia. These projects are abandoned in 1962, after independence of Algeria.

== History ==
Due to its geographical position, the region has always favored human presence since the prehistoric period.

== Climate ==
Mediterranean climate (Köppen climate classification: Csa)
