= Mohamed Tadjadit =

Algerian poet (born 1994)

- محمد تجاديت
- Born: 9 January 1994 (age 32); Bab El Oued, Algiers, Algeria
- Occupation: Poet
- Years active: 2019–present

Mohamed Tadjadit (Arabic: محمد تجاديت; born 9 January 1994) is an Algerian poet and human rights activist. He came to prominence during the Hirak between 2019 and 2021 for his slam poetry critical of the Algerian government. Since 2019, Tadjadit has been arrested on at least nine occasions, and has been sentenced to custodial prison sentences in 2019, 2020, 2022, 2024 and 2025.

== Early life ==
Tadjadit was born in Bab El Oued and raised in the Casbah of Algiers. His came from a family of shahids originally from the village of Ihnouchene, near Azeffoun. He lived in the Casbah until 2018, when the building he was living in collapsed, following which he moved to the city's suburbs. Tadjadit left education at the age of 14 and worked various jobs, including as an umbrella and jewellery salesperson, a fisherman, and a tanner. When he was 22, Tadjadit attempted to emigrate to Europe, travelling to Turkey before being arrested in Greece and deported back to Algeria.

== Activism ==
On 16 February 2019 the Hirak began in Algeria, six days after the country's President, Abdelaziz Bouteflika, announced his candidacy for a fifth presidential term. At the time, Tadjadit was working as a fruit seller in Algiers. He began taking part in poetry slams at various protests, performing in Darija, the vernacular form of Arabic spoken in the Maghreb. This gave Tadjadit rising prominence within the movement, with some giving him the moniker "the poet of the Hirak".

== Arrests and trials ==
=== 2019 arrest and imprisonment ===
On 11 November 2019, during the Hirak, Tadjadit was arrested during a sit-in protest in solidarity with political prisoners held outside the Sidi M'Hamed court. On 14 November, a judge ordered his pre-trial detention for "exposing to public view publications likely to harm the national interest". On 19 December, Tadjadit was sentenced to 18 months in prison. He was released on prison on 20 January 2020 following a presidential pardon, and on 12 March his sentence was reduced to a one-year suspended sentence.

=== 2020 arrest and imprisonment ===
On 23 August 2020, Tadjadit was arrested during a police search of his home in H'raoua. After four days in custody, a judge in the Bab El Oued court ordered his pre-trial detention on ten charges, including "inciting an unarmed gathering". That same day, Tadjadit began a hunger strike in protest of his arbitrary detention, which lasted until his trial began on 21 January 2021. He was given a six-month prison sentence with two months suspended, and was immediately released on time served.

=== 2021 arrest and imprisonment ===
Following a protest on 3 April 2021, Tadjadit and fellow activist Souheib Debbaghi recorded the testimony of a teenager who stated he had been sexually assaulted by a police officer and posted the video on Facebook, where it went viral. The following day, Tadjadit was arrested alongside his friend Malik Riahi at an apartment in Aïn Bénian. He was detained in police custody until 8 April, when he was presented in the Sidi M'Hamed without legal representation and charged alongside four others with "insulting a public official", "defaming the judiciary", "publishing false news", "corrupting a minor", and "inciting a minor to debauchery"; Tadjadit and his co-defedants were kept in pre-trial detention. On 28 February 2022, they started a hunger strike calling for either a date to be provided for their trial to start, or for them to be released on bail; they subsequently reported being assaulted by prison guards to dissuade them from striking. The hunger strike ended after three weeks when a trial date was announced. On 29 March 2022, Tadjadit was sentenced to two years imprisonment. Tadjadit successfully appealed the sentence, which was reduced to 16 months on 27 July. Tadjadit was released on 7 August 2022.

=== 2022 arrest and imprisonment ===
On 24 October 2022, Tadjadit was arrested for a fourth time, and after three days detention, was charged with "publishing false information", "exposing publications likely to harm the national interest to public view", and "inciting unarmed assembly". A judge in Sidi M'Hamed ordered his pre-trial detention; on 6 November, the Algiers Court accepted Tadjadit's appeal and released him on bail. Following his release, Tadjadit reported that his home had been placed under constant surveillance from security forces.

=== 2023 arrests ===
In 2023, Tadjadit was arrested on 2 January, 4 April, and 20 August, though on each occasion was provisionally released following initial court hearings.

=== 2024 arrest and imprisonment ===
On 29 January 2024, Tadjadit was arrested on charges of "apology of terrorism" and "use of communication technologies to support the actions and activities of terrorist organisations" at his home in Algiers. This followed a complaint filed by the director of the Algerian Treasury's judicial agency for criticisms made on the government on social media. Tadjadit appeared in court in Rouïba on 31 January without legal representation. Evidence against him included a video in which he criticised Algerian authorities and commented on the political and socioeconomic situation in Algeria, as well as private conversations on Messenger dated 2021 and earlier with members of the Islamist political movement Rachad. Tadjadit was ordered to serve pre-trial detention at El Harrach prison. His trial was originally scheduled for 18 July, but was pushed back to October 2024.

On 18 July 2024, Tadjadit went on trial at Bal El Oued court following an investigation into his arrest on 4 April 2023 in Azeffoun, marking the fifth time he had been put on trial since 2019. On 23 July, he was sentenced to six months' imprisonment for "publications likely to harm national interest" and "inciting an unarmed gathering".

On 31 October 2024, a presidential decree from Abdelmadjid Tebboune to mark the 70th anniversary of the outbreak of the Algerian War saw Tadjadit be one of 4000 detainees pardoned. He was released from prison on 1 November.

=== 2025 arrest and imprisonment ===
On 16 January 2025, Tadjadit was arrested after participating in the "#JeSuisPasSatisfait/#Manich_Radi" (lit. 'I am not satisfied') campaign on Facebook and TikTok. On 19 January, he was charged with "exposing to the public publications likely to harm the national interest", "undermining the integrity of the national territory", and "insulting a constituted body". All the evidence against him, which included videos in which he recited poems calling for the return of the Hirak and for the establishment of a "civil, not military, state", came from Tadjadit's social media accounts. On 20 January, he was sentenced to five years' imprisonment from the court in Rouïba, in addition to a fine of 200, 000 DZD. He is serving his sentence at El Harrach prison in Algiers.

On 30 November 2025, a new trial against Tadjadit and 12 other activists began, on state security charges.

== Response ==
Amnesty International described the Algerian authorities' "relentless targeting" of Tadjadit as confirmation of their continuing "repression of peaceful dissent". They described the 2021 charges against Tadjadit and his co-defendants as "bogus" and a response to them exposing the attempted rape of a child in police custody. Amnesty also criticised Tadjadit's 2025 trial as "expedited" and "undermining his right to a fair trial", calling for his "immediate and unconditional release".

Following his 2021 arrest and 2022 prison sentence, the Working Group on Arbitrary Detention declared that Tadjadit and his co-defendants had been arbitrary detained for acts related to their right to freedom of expression. MENA Rights criticised the evidence used against Tadjadit during his trial, including his communication with members of Rachad, noting that the conversations between them occurred prior to Rachad being classified as a terrorist organisation by the Official Gazette on 27 February 2022.

On 23 January 2025, the European Parliament issued a resolution calling for Tadjadit's immediate release. The Cairo Institute for Human Rights Studies similarly called for his immediate release and for authorities to end their judicial harassment of him.

In response to new charges being levied against Tadjadit in November 2025, a joint statement was issued by 20 Algerian, regional and international organisations calling for his immediate release. Signatories included PEN International, Index on Censorship, International Federation for Human Rights, Amnesty International and Committee for Justice.

== Recognition ==
In 2025, Tadjadit was nominated for Index on Censorship's Freedom of Expression Award for his poetry denouncing "repression, corruption, injustice, and the silencing of dissenting voices".
