= Khachna (disambiguation) =

Khachna is a mountain range in Algeria.

It may also refer to:

- Khemis El-Khachna, a town and commune in Algeria.
- Khemis El Khachna District, a district in Algeria.
- IB Khemis El Khachna, a football club in Algeria.
