= Réghaïa forest =

Forest in Algeria

- Location within Algiers
- Interactive map of Réghaïa forest

Geography
- Location: Algeria, Algiers, Reghaïa
- Coordinates: 36°46′18″N 3°20′22″E
- Area: 30 ha (74 acres)

The Réghaïa forest or Kadous forest is a forest located in Réghaïa in the wilaya of Algiers, Algeria.

The forest is managed by the Conservation des forêts d'Alger (CFA) under the supervision of the Direction générale des forêts (DGF).

== Location ==
The Réghaïa forest is located 29 kilometers east of Algiers. It is located in the commune of Réghaïa in the Mitidja.

== Presentation ==
The Réghaïa forest is governed by decree no. 84-45 of February 18, 1984, amended and supplemented by decree no. 07-231 of July 30, 2007. With a wooded area of 30 hectares, this forest is the only reclaimed marshland in the wilaya of Algiers. It was classified by the Ramsar Convention on June 4, 2003, as a nature reserve of international importance. This natural forest site has a Mediterranean climate, hot in summer and cold in winter, making it unique in the Algiers biogeographical region.

This forest area is part of the five ecosystems (marine, marsh, dune, lake and forest) of the Réghaïa protected area, the lake, which covers an area of 1,575 hectares: 900 ha of sea, 600 ha of forest and dune, plus a 75 ha freshwater lake. This forest and its surrounding biosphere are classified as a nature reserve.

== Fauna ==
The fauna of the Réghaïa forest is rich in zoological, ornithological and entomological diversity.

The forest is home to 21 species of mammals (jackal, genet, wild boar, famed fox, etc.).

=== Mammals ===
==== Algerian hedgehog ====
The Algerian hedgehog (Atelerix algirus') is found in this Algerian forest. This white-bellied hedgehog lives in the coastal regions of Algeria. It is pale in color and weighs from 700 to 950 g. This hedgehog is a protected species throughout Algeria.

==== Golden jackal ====
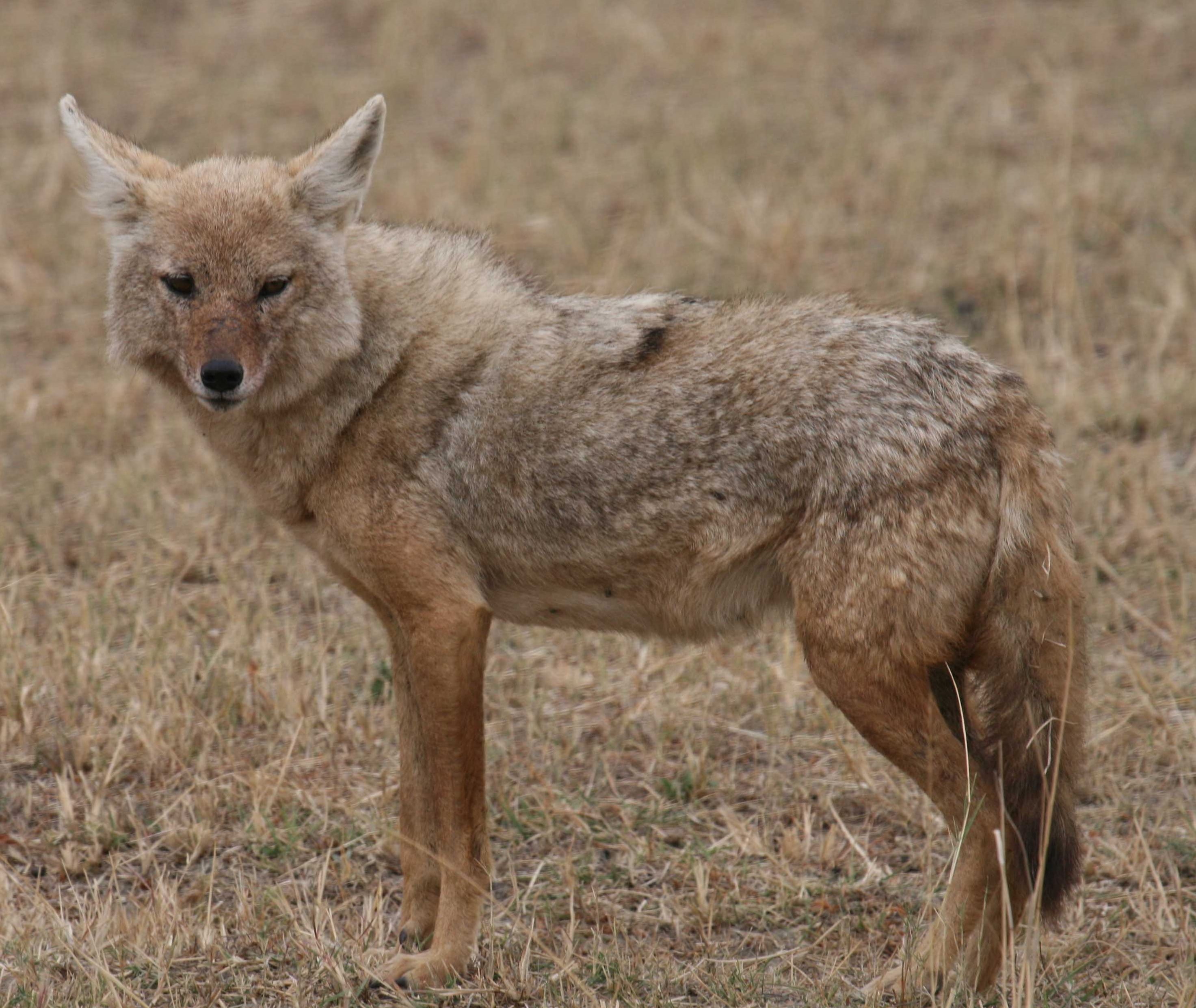
African wolf.

The African wolf (Canis lupaster) is a very shy, nocturnal and discreet carnivorous mammal. Its body length (without tail) varies between 70 and 85 cm, its height at the withers between 38 and 50 cm, its tail length is 25 cm, with a weight of 7 to 14 kg, while its maximum speed oscillates between 40 and over 50 km/h.

==== Wild rabbit ====
The wild rabbit (Oryctolagus cuniculus) is a lagomorph mammal; wild numbers are common in Algeria, but declining.

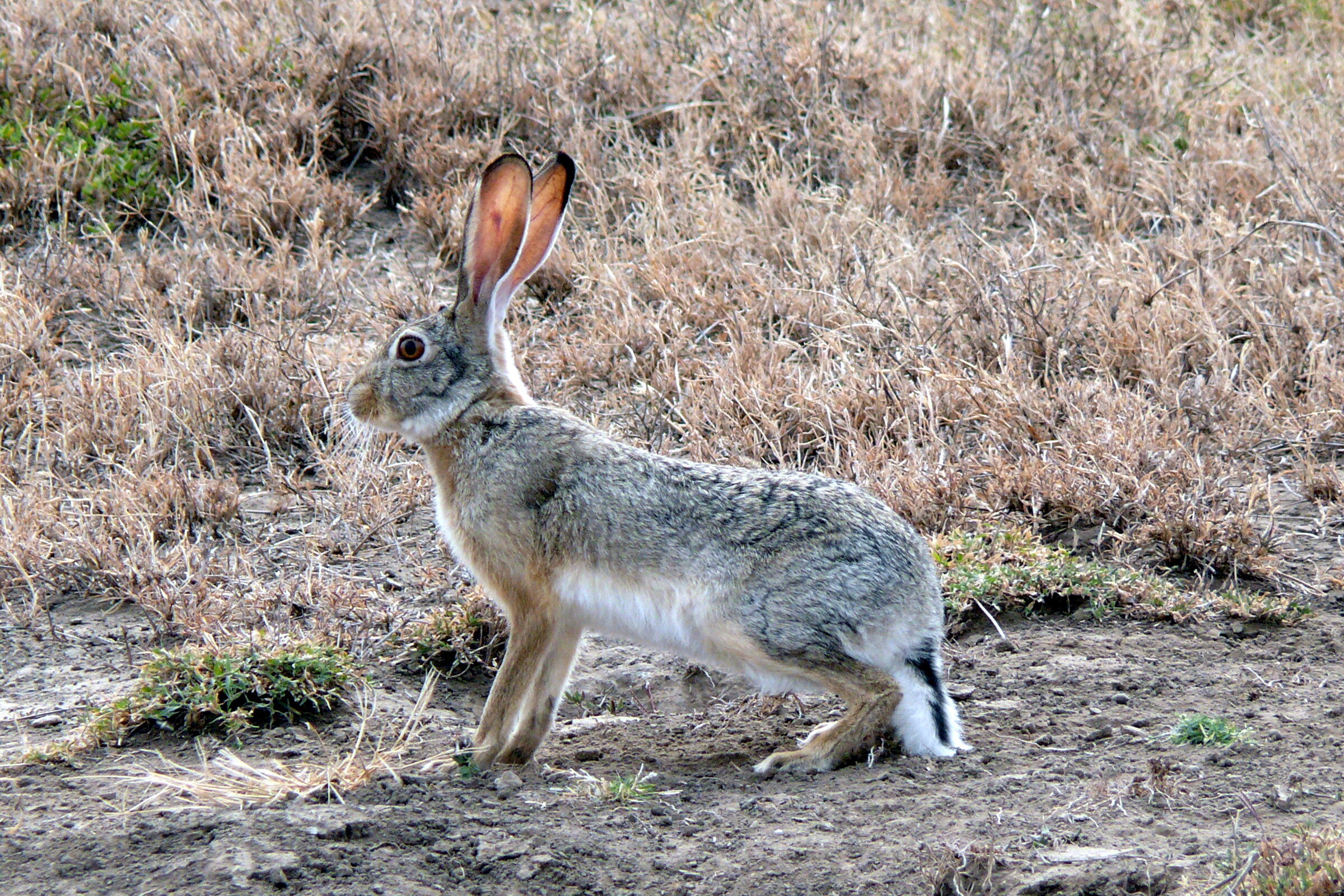
Cape hare.

==== Cape hare ====
The Cape hare (Lepus capensis) is a rodent.

==== Genet ====
The African genet (Genetta genetta afra) is a very shy and discreet nocturnal carnivorous mammal, whose size, color and morphology can sometimes be mistaken for that of a cat. There are numerous subspecies in Europe, Africa and the Near East. It is a representative species of the Viverridae family.

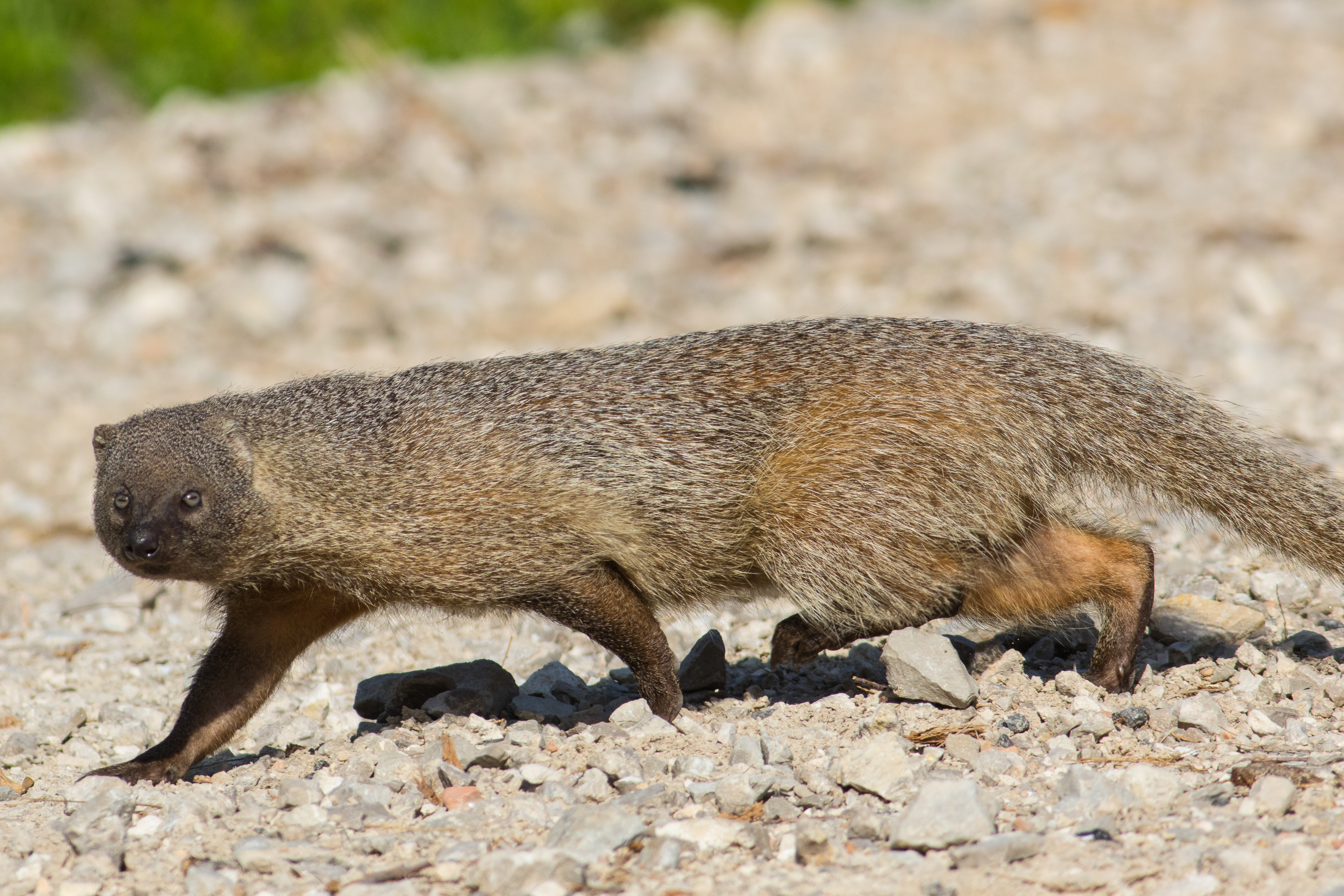
Ichneumon mongoose.

==== Ichneumon mongoose ====
The ichneumon mongoose (Herpestes ichneumon) is a mammal known locally as zerdi in Arabic and izerdhi in Berber. Both names derive from the Arabic verb "zarada" meaning "to swallow", reflecting the mongoose's ability to swallow its food and small prey.

==== Barbary stag ====
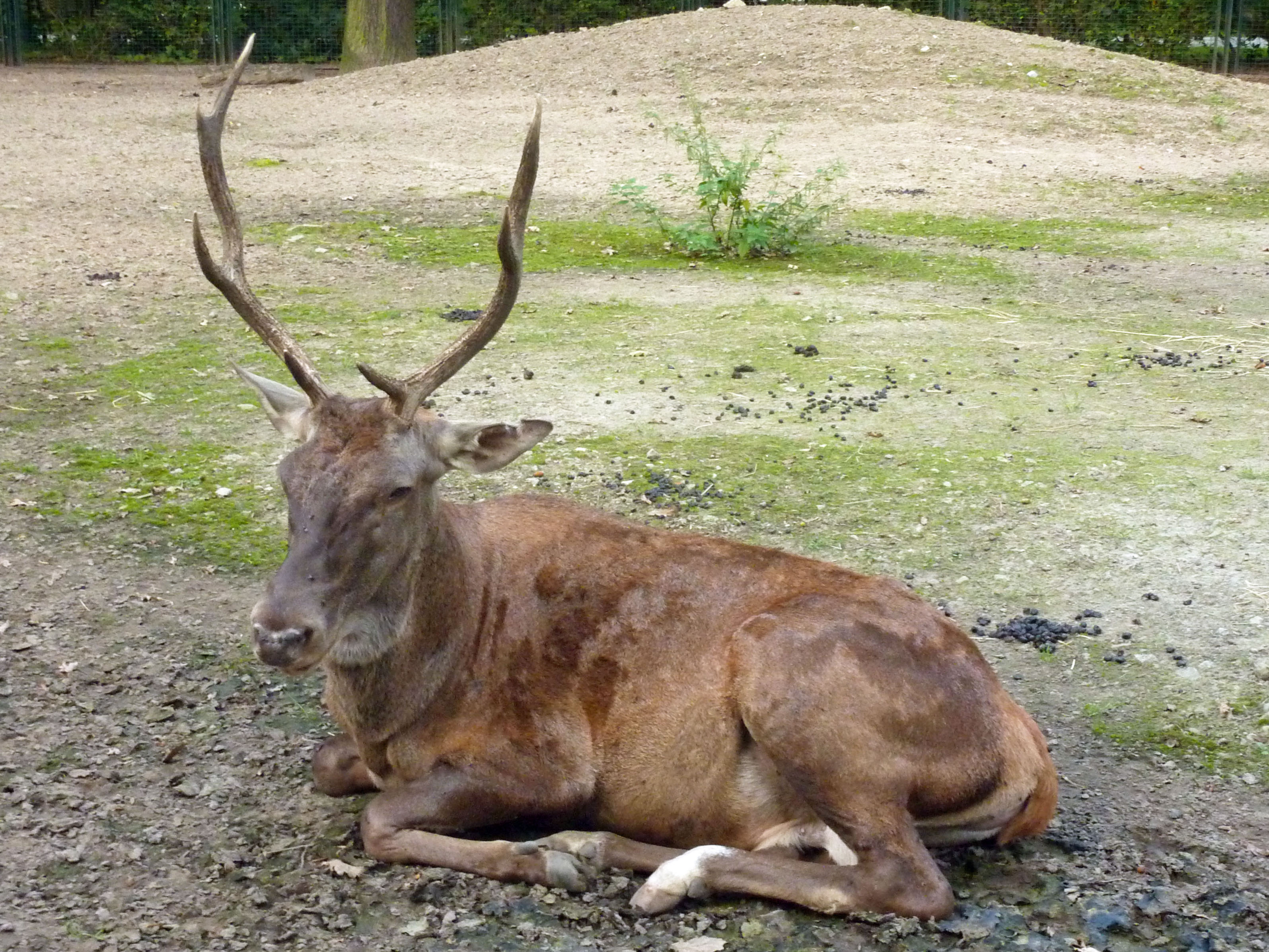
Barbay stag (Cervus elaphus barbarus).

The Barbary stag (Cervus elaphus barbarus benetti) is a large cervid subspecies of the Red Deer found in Algerian forests. It is on the verge of extinction as the only representative of the Cervidae family in Africa. The Barbary stag is diurnal, but often eats at night in fields and meadows as a crepuscular and nocturnal species, where it feeds as a herbivore and ruminant. It prefers fir (Abies alba) to spruce (Picea abies) and wood, eating the buds and young shoots of trees and shrubs, except for thorny trees, which it avoids.

==== Wild boar ====
The wild boar (Sus scrofa) colonizes virtually every habitat in this forest. When the soil is damp, this animal turns over the earth with its strong stoppers in search of invertebrates and plant roots. Its lifespan varies between 8 and 10 years.

=== Birds ===
The Réghaïa forest is a site visited by several species of migratory, resting, sedentary and nesting birds. It is home to three globally endangered waterbird species, namely the marbled teal, the Ferruginous duck and the white-headed duck, which nest at Réghaïa. Around 3,000 waterbirds frequent this forest and its lake, which hosts an average of 47 local and migratory bird species each year.

== Flora ==
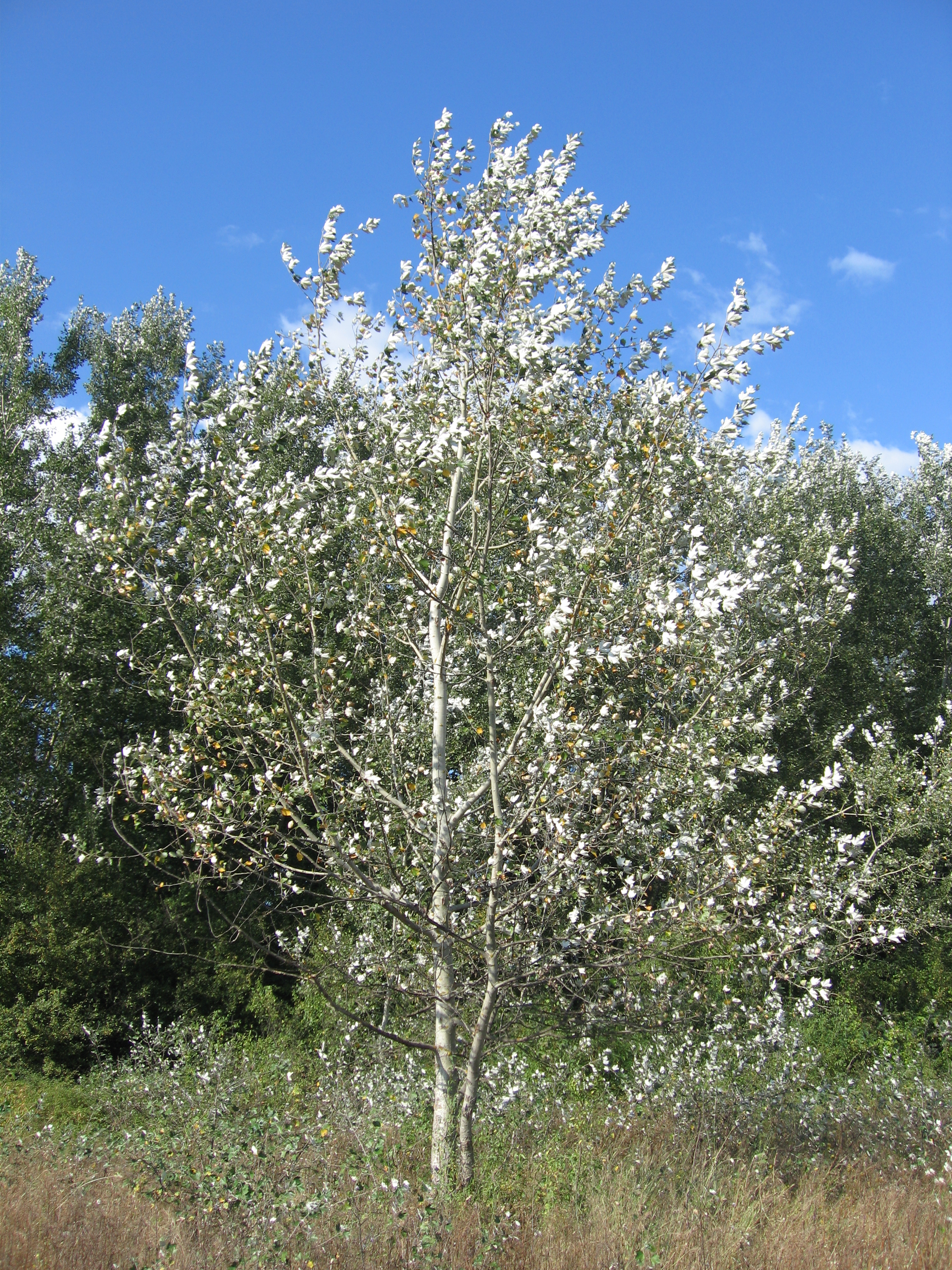
Populus alba.

The Réghaïa forest adjoining the lake is populated by hydrophilic trees (Salix alba, Populus alba, Eucalyptus camaldulensis) and the plants that live there are the cattail Typha latifolia and the rush Juncus acutus, as well as the halophilic Plantago coronopus group. Groups of Pancratium maritimum, Lotus creticus, Ammophila arenaria and Chamaerops humilis grow in narrow strips along the coast. The scrubland that forms a more or less narrow belt around the forest and lake provides good protection for birdlife. It is represented by the Oleo-lentisque composed of Olea europaea, Pistacia lentiscus, Crataegus monogyna, Rubus ulmifolius, Smilax aspera and Hedera helix.

== Hunting center ==
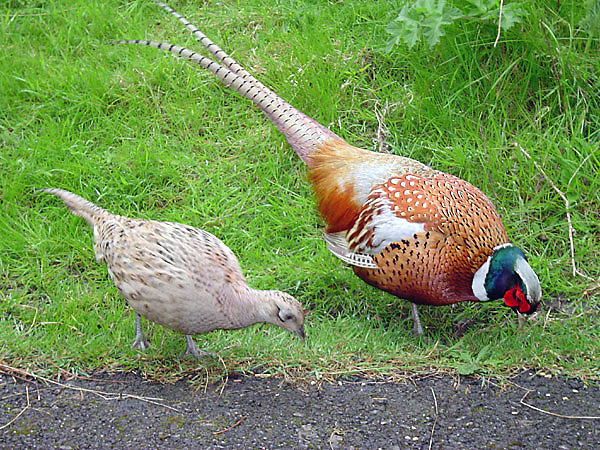
Pheasant birds.

The Réghaïa forest is home to a cynegetic center in the southwest of its perimeter, which collaborates actively with the Zéralda cynegetic center. It was created by decree no. 83-75 of January 8, 1983.

The Réghaïa cynegetic center was upgraded in 2006, after having long been a protected reserve reserved exclusively for the specialists who carried out their work there. It was then promoted in 2011 to manage the Réghaïa nature reserve. The Réghaïa Cynégétique Center, in collaboration with the Direction Générale des Forêts, ensures that the Réghaïa wetland remains on the Ramsar Convention list of wetlands.

The CCR has four essential missions: hunting, ornithological monitoring, scientific research, communication and public awareness. It includes an education and awareness center, an exhibition hall for plant and animal species, and two rooms, one for practical work in the natural sciences and the other for film screenings. It is also a hunting center for breeding waterfowl to repopulate water bodies with certain species.

== National ringing center ==
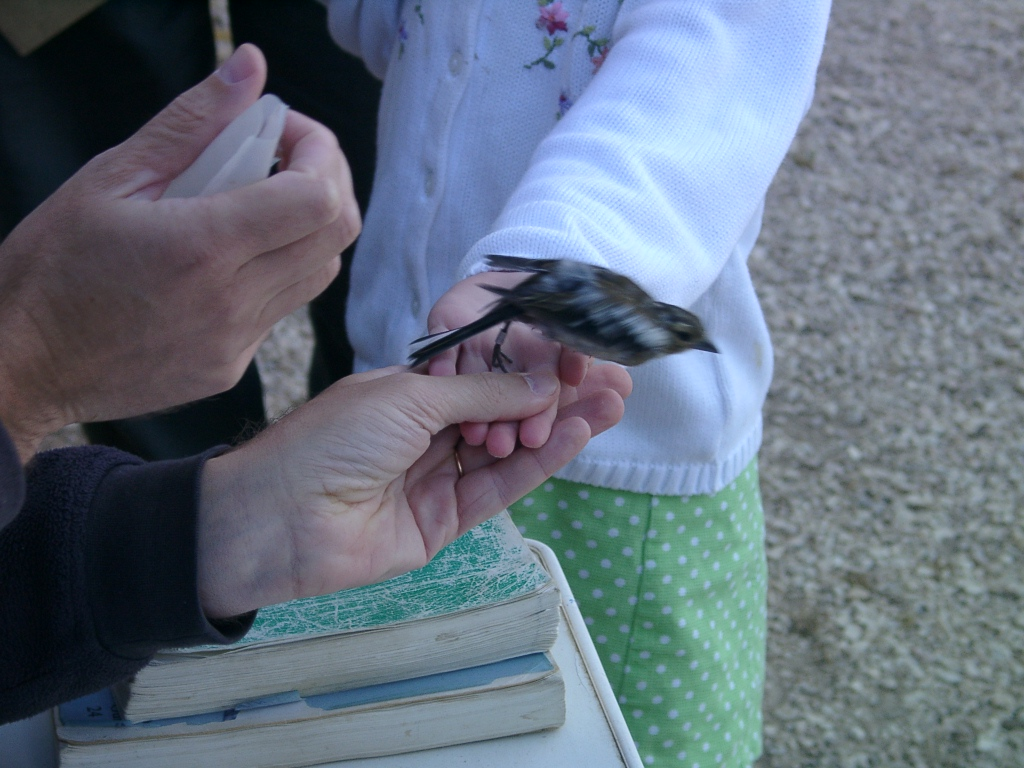
Bird ringing.

The Réghaïa forest is home to the National Bird Banding Center (CNB).

This center tracks wild birds by marking them with bands in order to study several aspects of their life in the wild, such as migratory movements. The CNB collaborates with a number of international centers, as the regions traveled by banded birds can be very distant, especially during migration.

Each ring placed on a bird is unique, thanks to an alphanumeric code coupled with a file containing various information on the bird (species name, sex or age) as well as the date and location of banding. This information can be supplemented by biometric data (weight, wing and beak length, adiposity, etc.). Through the organization of bird releases throughout Algeria, this center is working towards the creation of a national network of banding units and, ultimately, integration into the international network.

== See also ==
- Wildlife of Algeria
- Reghaïa Valley
