= Rouïba District =

Rouïba District دائرة رويبة
- District
- Map of Algeria highlighting Algiers Province

- Map of Algiers Province highlighting Rouïba District
- Coordinates: 36°44′N 3°17′E
- Country: Algeria
- Province: Algiers
- District seat: Rouïba

Population (1998)
  - Total: 134,263
- Time zone: UTC+01 (CET)
- District code: 13
- Municipalities: 3

Rouïba is a district in Algiers Province, Algeria. It was named after its capital, Rouïba.

== Municipalities ==
The district is further divided into 3 municipalities, which is the lowest number in the province:

- Rouïba
- Reghaïa
- H'raoua
