= Mohamed Cherak =

Algerian journalist and editor-in-chief

- محمد شراق
- Born: 14 August 1977; Hammedi, Algeria
- Died: 17 November 2018 (aged 41); Djasr Kasentina, Algeria
- Resting place: Hammadi, Algeria
- Education: Algiers 3 University
- Occupations: Journalist; Editor-in-chief
- Writing career
- Pen name: Rezki رزقي; Abdul Quddus عبد القدوس
- Language: Arabic, Berber, French
- Years active: 1998–2018
- Notable works: El Fadjr (2000–2002); El Ahdath (2002–2003); El Khabar (2003–2018)

Mohamed Cherak (Arabic: محمد شراق; 14 August 1977 – 17 November 2018) was an Algerian journalist and editor-in-chief.

== Early life ==
Cherak was born in 1977 in the town of Hammadi, in the lower Kabylia region of Algeria, west of the Khachna Massif and south-west of the town of Boumerdès.

After primary and intermediate studies in Hammadi and Khemis El Khechna, Cherak continued his studies in journalism, information science and communication studies at the Algiers 3 University where he obtained his bachelor's degree in 1998.

Cherak began his professional journalism career with the daily El Fadjr in 2000 while a student at the École Nationale Supérieure de Journalisme et des Sciences de l'Information (ITFC) in Algiers.

He proved himself professionally at the daily El Ahdath in 2002, and was promoted as its editor-in-chief. He wrote articles there under the pseudonym Mohamed Abdul Quddus (Arabic: محمد عبد القدوس).

== El Khabar ==
Cherak joined the editorial team of the Arabic-language daily El Khabar in 2004. He then joined the paper's political coverage team for seven years before being named section chief in 2015.

In 2016, Cherak found himself confronting Hamid Grine, then the Minister of Communication, who declared a dirty war against the El Khabar, which was critical of the power of Algerian President Abdelaziz Bouteflika and his younger brother Saïd.

To put Bouteflika's fifth term project on a wheelchair, the presidential clan launched a retribution against El Khabar and the headlines of the Algerian independent press in a mock political battle under legal cover, because of El Khabar's editorial line that Cherak orchestrated with Bouteflika's opponents despite difficult circumstances and blackmail attempts.

== Disease ==
Cherak fell ill in June 2018 after heart failure problems, for which he was hospitalized for many months in Algiers. Cardiovascular disease led to his transfer to a French hospital in September 2018 for treatment. Cherak then was transferred for two months of care in a specialized French health service before returning to Algeria in November 2018, where he received care in the military hospital of Aïn Naadja.

The Secretary-General of the Workers' Party, Louisa Hanoune, was among the prominent political figures who provided support for Cherak, visiting him frequently while he was in the Algerian hospital, and personally supervised his transfer to the Hôpital Européen Georges-Pompidou in Paris for follow-up treatment.

== Death ==
Cherak died in the morning of Saturday, 17 November 2018 at age 41 after several days in a coma in intensive care at the Djasr Kasentina Hospital in Algiers. Cherak left a widow and three children.

Cherak was buried in Sidi Khaled Cemetery in Hammadi, his hometown, after Asr prayer before a large crowd of friends, newspaper directors, ministers, and senior Algerian state officials.

== Tributes ==
The then-Minister of Communication, Djamel Kaouane offered his condolences to Cherak's family the next day The two public dailies El Moudjahid and Horizons reported Kaouane's message of condolence in their pages. The then-Minister of the Interior and Local Communities, Noureddine Bedoui, also offered condolences to the family and the press community while imploring God (Allah) Almighty to offer Cherak mercy.

El Khabar newspaper organized Cherak's funeral on 18 November at its headquarters in Hydra, where Cherak's friends and colleagues, including media professionals, government officials, politicians and trade unionists, offered their condolences to the newspaper's family.

Journalist Othman Lahiani wrote a lamentation poem dedicated to his friend Cherak on 20 November.

After Cherak's death, the La Radieuse association 23 November 2018 paid him a moving tribute in his family home in Hammadi. The association's president, Kada Chafi, accompanied by Algerian football stars Lakhdar Belloumi, Mohamed Hansal, Mohamed Chaïb, Mohamed Kaci-Saïd, Fodil Megharia and Mustapha Kouici, gave two plane tickets to Cherak's parents so that they could perform an omra, their son's wish. The tribute took place in the presence of the entire Cherak family, friends of the late journalist, neighbors and residents of the Hammadi municipality. Cherak's colleagues and friends organized a 24 November commemorative assembly in the Tahar Djaout press house in Algiers, where journalists from several press titles, trade union activists and some loyal readers of the deceased's articles met.

== See also ==
- List of Algerians
- List of Algerian writers
- List of newspapers in Algeria
- El Khabar
