= Ech-Chaab =

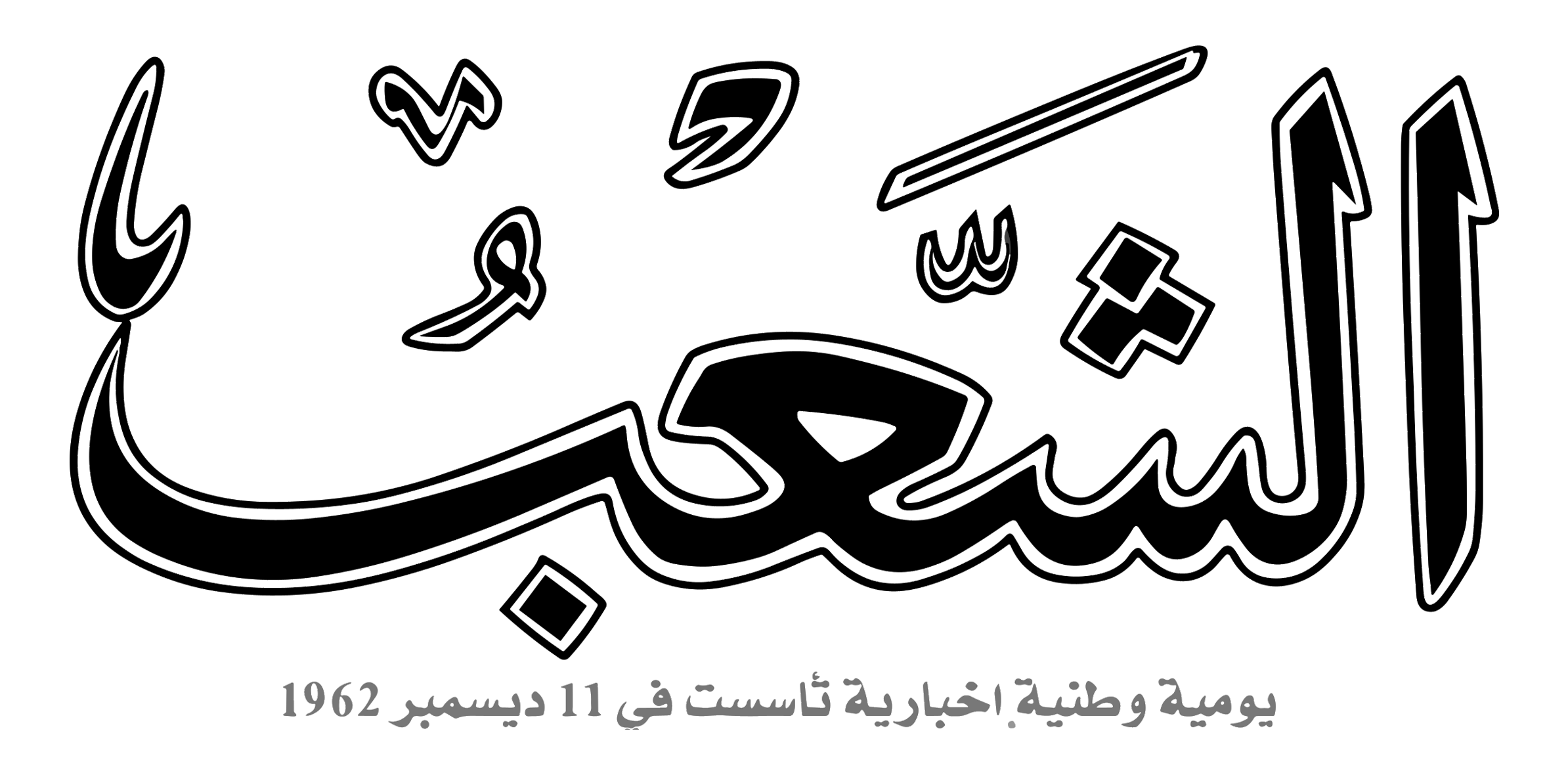
- Ech-Chaab logo.
- Type: Daily newspaper
- Format: Tabloid
- Owner(s): Ech-Chaab
- Editor: Mustapha Hemissi
- Founded: December 11, 1962; 62 years ago
- Political alignment: Centre-left
- Language: Arabic
- Headquarters: Algiers, Algeria
- Circulation: 100,000 (May 2001 - May 2002)
- Website: echaab.dz

Ech-Chaab (Arabic: الشعب, lit. 'The People') is a daily newspaper in Algeria published six days a week in the tabloid format. It is one of the most widely read newspapers in Algeria.

== History and profile ==
Ech-Chaab is an Algerian general daily newspaper appearing in Arabic which was founded on 11 December 1962, a few months after the Algerian independence.

This journalistic title is currently one of the six dailies of the Algerian public press.

Journalist Mustapha Hemissi was appointed head of the newspaper on 31 May 2020, succeeding Fnides Ben Bella.

== Notable journalists ==
- Othmane Senadjki (1959-2010)

== See also ==
- List of newspapers in Algeria
