= Ain Taya Forest =

Forest in Aïn Taya, Algeria

- Interactive map of Ain Taya Forest

Geography
- Location: Aïn Taya, Algeria
- Coordinates: 36°47′57″N 3°15′59″E
- Area: 5 ha (12 acres)

The forest known as Ain Taya Forest, Kadous Park, or Kadous Forest is situated in the Ain Taya area of Algiers Province. It is managed by the Directorate of Forests and Green Belt of Algiers, under the supervision of the General Directorate of Forests.

== Location ==
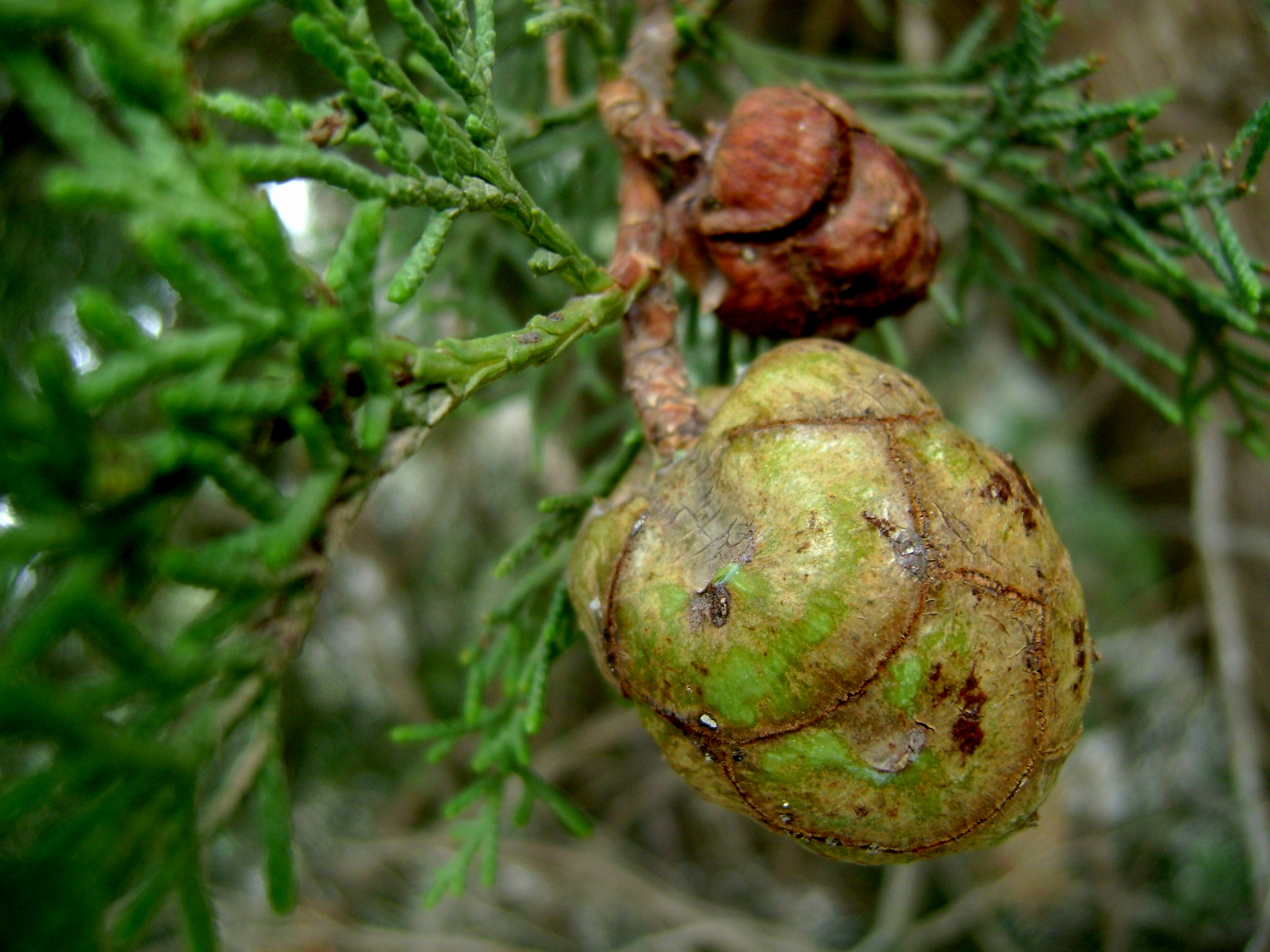
Cupressus trees

The Ain Taya Forest is situated 18 km east of Algiers in eastern Algiers Province, 70 km east of Tipaza, and 4 km from the Mediterranean Sea. It is located within the municipality of Ain Taya in Mitidja.

== History ==
The Ain Taya Forest was established by Decree No. 84–45 on February 18, 1984, and subsequently amended and supplemented by Decree No. 07–09 on January 11, 2007. It encompasses approximately 5 hectares (12 acres) and extends for 0.9 km to the west of the town of Ain Taya.

The forest is home to a variety of Pinus pinaster and Cupressus trees.
