= Othmane Senadjki =

Algerian journalist and editor-in-chief

- عثمان سناجقي
- Born: 23 May 1959; Khemis El Khechna, Algeria
- Died: 29 December 2010 (aged 51); Béni Messous, Algeria
- Resting place: Khemis El Khechna, Algeria
- Education: Journalism
- Alma mater: University of Algiers
- Occupations: Journalist; Editor-in-chief
- Writing career
- Pen name: Mustapha مصطفى
- Language: Arabic, Berber, French
- Years active: 1985–2010
- Notable works: Ech-Chaab; El Khabar

Othmane Senadjki (Arabic: عثمان سناجقي; 23 May 1959 in Khemis El Khechna – 29 December 2010 in Béni Messous) was an Algerian journalist and editor-in-chief of El Khabar newspaper.

== Early life ==
Senadjki was born in 1959 in the town of Khemis El Khechna in the lower Kabylia region of Algeria, west of the Khachna Massif and south-west of the town of Boumerdès.

After primary and intermediate studies in Khemis El Khechna, Senadjki continued his secondary studies at Lycée Ibn Tumart in the town of Boufarik where he obtained his baccalaureate in 1978, and then pursued studies in political science and international relations at the University of Algiers where he obtained his bachelor's degree in 1982.

== Ech-Chaab ==
Senadjki began his journalistic career in 1985 at the public newspaper Ech-Chaab after completing his military service in the Algerian army which lasted two years, and after having passed the entrance examination to this Algerian Arabic-speaking daily created on 11 December 1962.

Indeed, he participated during the month of August 1985 in this competition with his colleagues Omar Ourtilane, Cherif Rezki, Abdelhakim Belbati, Omar Kahoul and Kamel Djouzi, and the tests took place at the journalism school of Algiers with the participation of dozens of new Algerian university graduates.

It was Saad Bouakba, the editor-in-chief of the newspaper Ech-Chaab at the time, who then charged the journalists Bachir Hammadi, Mohamed Abbas and Mustapha Hemissi with the mission of correcting the copies of these young applicants for the profession of journalist. This is how Senadjki succeeded and was retained after he ranked first.

During his career in this newspaper with a large audience and Algerian readership, he worked in the section of national and political affairs, and he was known for his inveterate and diligent defense of Arab causes, as well as his interest in living condition of the ordinary citizen and the news of rural and isolated areas.

He also supervised the newsletter section for five years when he interacted with correspondence from his devotees until 1990.

== El Khabar ==
Senadjki continued his work in the newspaper Ech-Chaab until the Algerian constitution of 23 February 1989 allowed professional journalists to found their own independent press titles.

This is how he participated with several journalists from different backgrounds in the creation of the Arabic-speaking daily El Khabar on 1 November 1990.

He supervised the international affairs section in this newspaper before becoming deputy editor-in-chief Omar Ourtilane, and when the latter was assassinated by Islamist terrorism in Algeria on 3 October 1995, it was Senadjki who replaced him in the post of editor-in-chief.

When Senadjki took over in the editorial staff of El Khabar in 1995, this daily then became the privileged source of information for all international press agencies during the Algerian security crisis.

He included the "Deep Algeria" page (Arabic: الجزائر العميقة), which was created specifically to follow up on people's concerns and convey their affairs and problems within the framework of neighborhood media bearing a news character, and providing a national service to citizens and public authorities.

== Death ==
Senadjki died in 2010 at the age of 51 after spending four days in intensive care and in a coma at the Beni Messous hospital in Algiers.

He indeed succumbed at dawn on Thursday, 29 December after complications from his state of health, leaving behind a widow and an orphan child.

Indeed, as soon as he entered the intensive care room on Saturday, 25 December, steps were taken to transfer him to a foreign hospital, but death took him before his flight to France.

He was buried in a cemetery in his hometown of Khemis El Khechna in the presence of a large crowd including his friends, newspaper directors as well as ministers and senior officials of the Algerian state who wanted to pay him a final tribute.

== Tributes ==
A tribute was paid to Senadjki in 2012 by the association of journalists and press correspondents of Boumerdès Province. A football tournament was held in honor of the former editor-in-chief of the newspaper El Khabar, and the Boumerdès press team won the tournament.

This event was sponsored by the Direction de la Jeunesse et des Sports (DJS) and the Sport Coating Institution (IRS Deriche), and ended on 5 May 2012 with the presentation of medals and cups to the winners. Symbolic gifts were offered by journalists from Boumerdès to Senadjki's family through colleagues from El Khabar newspaper in Boumerdès after the tournament won by the local press team.

Three students prepared in 2013 a master's thesis in media and communication sciences, specializing in journalism, in which they discussed the qualities of Senadjki as a phenomenon of journalism that combines professionalism and humanity. This university thesis was supervised by Professor Ahmed Boukhari, and drew up a written and photographed portrait of Senadjki and where the students discussed the path of his career until his death in 2010.

The Boumerdès Province officially honored in October 2013 the memory of Senadjki as well as four of his colleagues, like Mohamed Hassaïne, Rabah Hammouche, Mohamed Brara and Lamia Guettaf.

In May 2015, members of the Boumerdès press club went to the cemetery of Khemis El Kechna where they laid a wreath of flowers on the grave of their colleague Senadjki.

== See also ==
- List of Algerians
- List of Algerian writers
- List of newspapers in Algeria
