= Réghaïa lake =

Lake in Algiers

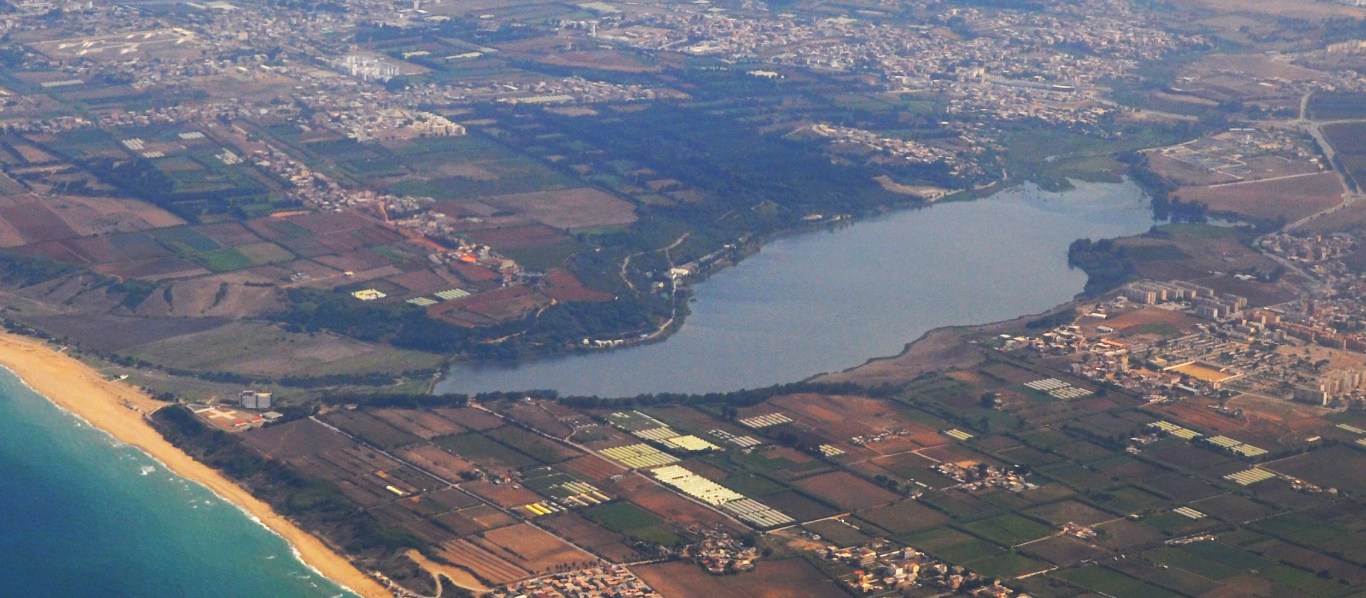
- Location: Réghaïa, Algiers, Algeria
- Coordinates: 36°46′15″N 3°20′04″E
- Type: Lake

Location
- Interactive map of Réghaïa lake

Réghaïa lake is located in the commune of Réghaïa, Algeria, 29 km east of Algiers.

It collects water from a watershed of 842 km^{2}, from which the Oued Réghaïa flows. The lake, together with the Réghaïa forest, was recognized as a Ramsar site on June 4, 2003.

== Location ==
Réghaïa lake is located 29 km east of Algiers. It is located in the commune of Réghaïa in the Mitidja region of Basse Kabylie.

== Description ==
Réghaïa lake corresponds to the estuary of the Oued Réghaïa, whose mouth is blocked by a dune belt. Some 600 meters upstream from the Mediterranean, an artificial dyke retains the permanent waters of the marshland site. This maritime marsh has gently sloping banks.

== History ==
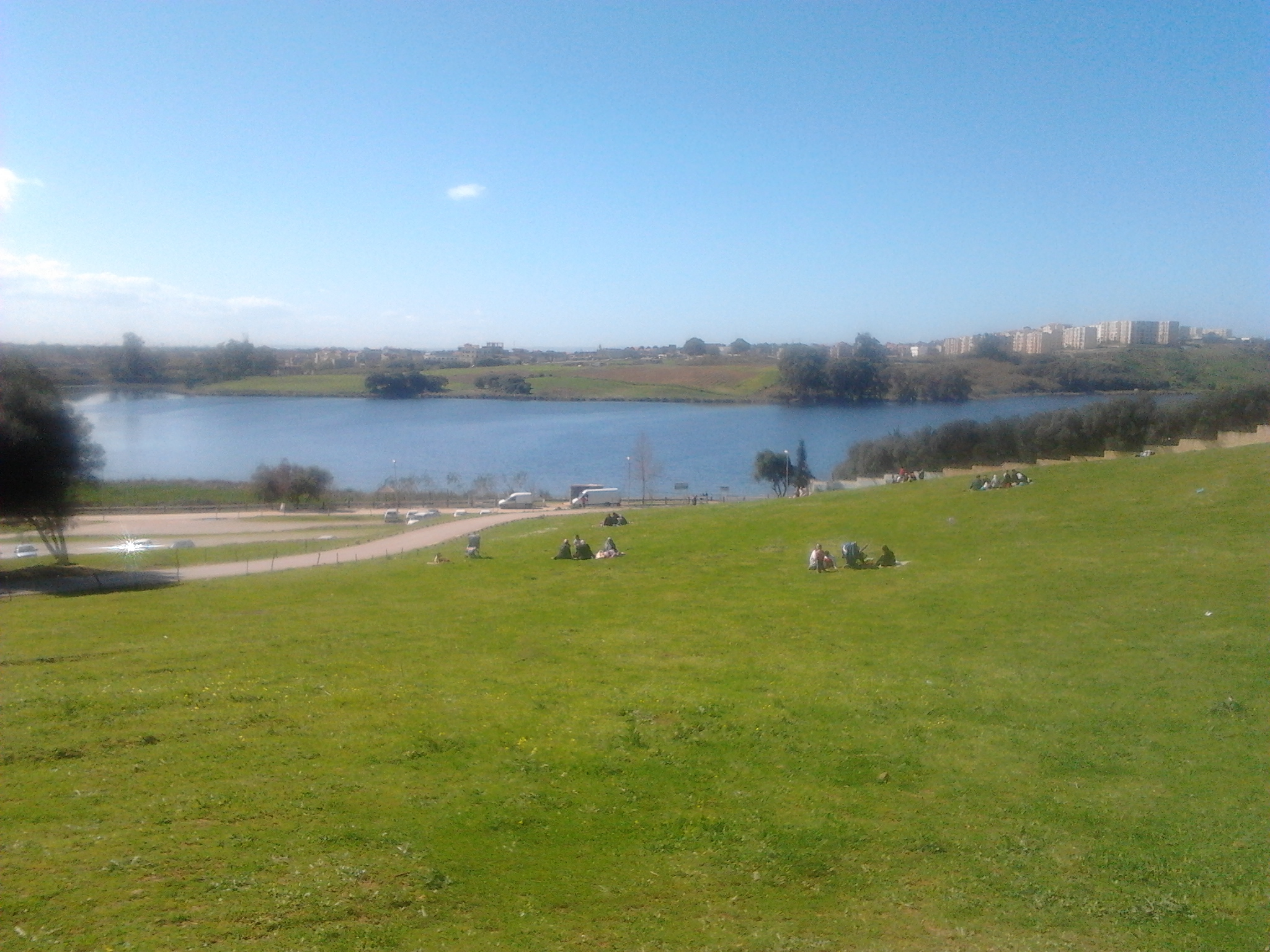
Reghaïa lake.

Before the 1930s, when the dunes held back the Oued Réghaïa and its bed had not been deepened, there was a natural marsh rich in waterfowl, but the quest for new farmland led to the wadi being drained by pumping, draining and planting eucalyptus trees. This project was eventually abandoned, and an earth embankment was built to create a reservoir for irrigation, followed by another embankment to hold back larger volumes of water from the wadi. The downstream channel was then recalibrated.

== Physical characteristics ==
=== Geology ===
Réghaïa lake is characterized by a Neogene syncline of fine Miocene and Plio-Quaternary deposits located midway between Gibraltar and the Sicilian Channel.

This geological formation, which folded and then filled, is characterized by alluvial and marshy facies.

Recent and current Quaternary facies are composed of marine and lacustrine deposits, recent pebbly and silty alluvium, consolidated dunes, scallop lumachelles, marine poudingues and sandstones, clayey sand and ancient Quaternary alluvium.

=== Geomorphology ===
Réghaïa lake is located on an elevated central plateau in the Réghaïa region.

Its surface, deeply incised by numerous torrential valleys, has an undulating configuration criss-crossed by the Oued Réghaïa, which forms a small, narrow valley with two slopes.

One to the east, formerly belonging to the Saïdani and Ali Khodja farming estates, is now occupied by the Réghaïa hunting center, the national ringing center and a pumping station.

The other, to the west, is occupied by the Douar Aïn El Kahla and the Domaine agricole de Boudhane.

In the northern part of the valley, more or less fixed dunes stretch out, separating the mouth of the Oued Réghaïa from the Mediterranean Sea.

=== Pedology ===
The soil at Réghaïa lake tends to be sandy-loamy. The central part, on the other hand, is characterized by a fertile soil with a clayey tendency, and is made up of Mediterranean brown soils and brownified red soils.

=== Hydrology ===
Lake Réghaïa is fed by groundwater from the Réghaïa marsh, which is fed by Oued Réghaïa, Oued Guesbaï, Oued Berraba, Oued El Biar, Oued Boureah and Oued El Hamiz.

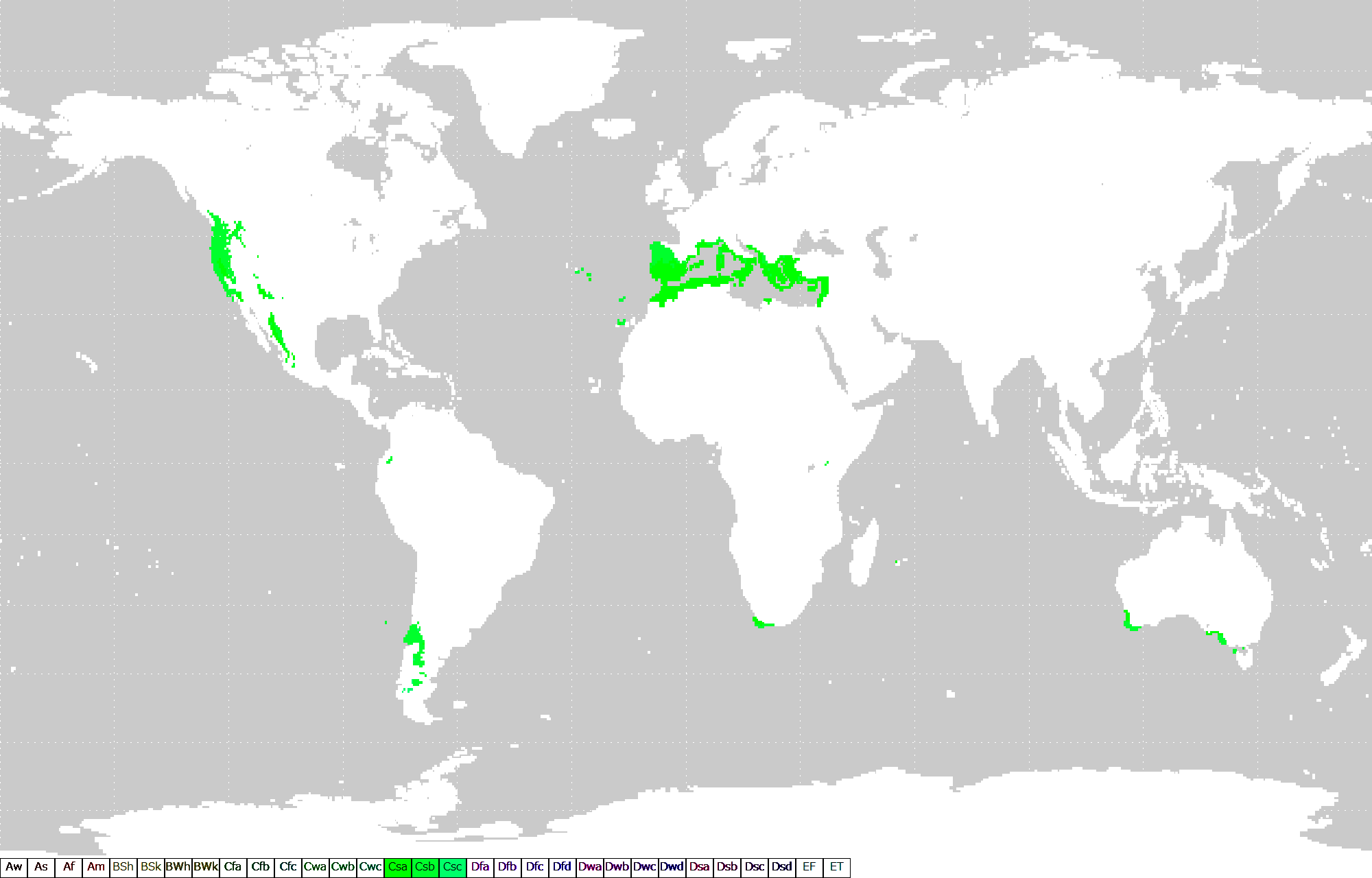
Mediterranean climate around the world.

=== Climate ===
Réghaïa lake is located in a region with a Mediterranean climate, characterized by a 7-month wet season and a 5-month summer dry season. According to Emberger's climagram, the Réghaïa marsh is located in the sub-humid bioclimatic zone, characterized in particular by dry, hot summers and mild, wet winters.

==== Winds ====
Winds in Lake Réghaïa are usually light to moderate, predominantly north-westerly. The sirocco blows on average 5 days a year, while thunderstorms are frequent, especially in winter and autumn with an average of 23.3 days/year.

==== Humidity ====
The wet season in Lake Réghaïa encompasses all three seasons (autumn, winter and spring), while the dry season is summer.

==== Climate summary ====
The climate at Réghaïa lake is Mediterranean, with a 7-month wet season and a 5-month summer dry season.

=== Hydrological values ===
Réghaïa lake is characterized by flood spreading, groundwater recharge and sediment accumulation. The lake's actual functions are coastal erosion prevention, flood control, sediment capture and water quality maintenance. In addition to these functions, Lake Réghaïa irrigates 1,200 hectares of farmland.

=== Ecological features ===
Réghaïa lake comprises 5 ecological habitats.

==== Maritime marsh ====
The Réghaïa maritime marsh plays an important role in containing and regulating wadi flooding, as well as preserving certain ornithological species that nest there. The vegetation of this maritime marsh forms distinct zones in concentric circles around the lake.

==== Open water ====
The Réghaïa open-water lake is a permanent freshwater reservoir covering more than 75 hectares.

==== Dune belt ====
The Réghaïa dune belt, a natural barrier between the Mediterranean Sea and the maritime marsh, is made up of stabilized dunes. The vegetation, which grows in narrow strips along this coastal cordon, stops and fixes the sand, forming a barrier that closes off the mouth of the Oued Réghaïa.

==== Marine zone ====
The Réghaïa marine zone is located around the small Agueli or Bounettah island, which is a nesting ground for certain ornithological species.

==== Scrubland ====
Réghaïa's scrubland forms a more or less narrow belt around the lake, providing good protection for avifauna. In such a diverse environment, the fauna is obviously very varied, with herbivores and carnivores contributing to the food chain of the maritime marsh.

== See also ==
- List of lakes
- Reghaïa Valley
- Geography of Algeria
- Wildlife of Algeria
