= Ouled Hedadj =

Coordinates: 36°43′12″N 3°21′00″E

- Commune and town
- Interactive map of Ouled Hedadj
- Country: Algeria
- Province: Boumerdès Province

Population (2008)
  - Total: 29,012
- Time zone: UTC+1 (CET)

Ouled Hedadj is a town and commune in Boumerdès Province, Algeria. According to the 2008 census it has a population of 29,012.

== History ==
- First Battle of the Issers (1837)
