= H'raoua =

H'raoua الهراوة
- Municipality
- Commune of H'raoua
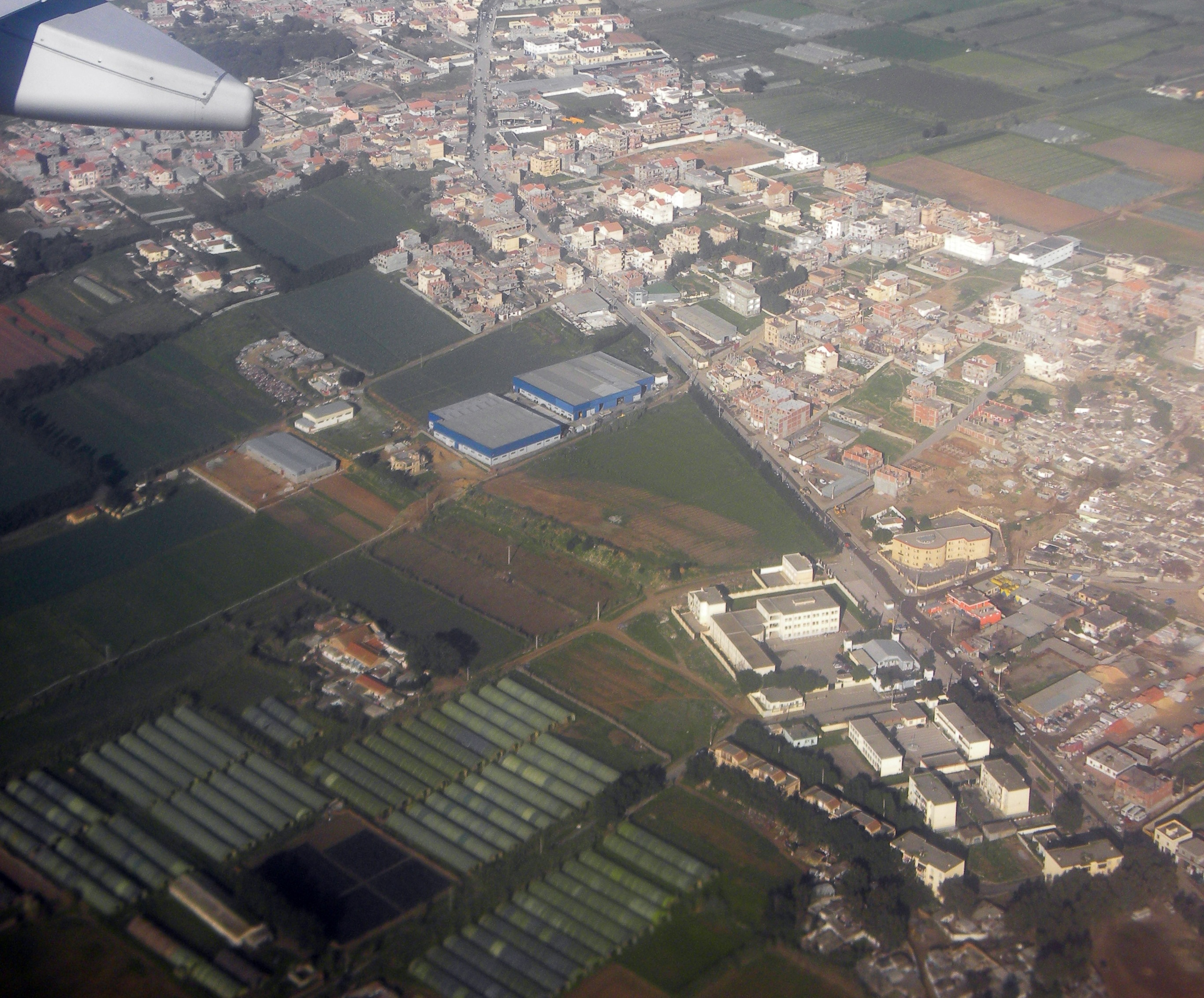

- Location of H'raoua within Algiers Province

- Location of H'raoua within Algeria
- Coordinates: 36°46′N 3°19′E
- Country: Algeria
- Province: Algiers
- District: Rouïba

Government
  - PMA Seats: 11
  - PMA president: Mr. Allal Bessaâd (2002-2007)

Area
  - Total: 13 km^{2} (5.0 sq mi)

Population (1998)
  - Total: 18,167
  - Density: 1,400/km^{2} (3,600/sq mi)
- Time zone: UTC+01 (CET)
- Postal code: 16116
- ONS code: 1641

H'raoua is a municipality in Algiers province, Algeria. It is located in Rouïba district, and is an outer suburb of Algiers. It has a small coastline on the Mediterranean Sea. The town proper (chef-lieu agglomeration) of H'raoua is located 2 kilometers (1.2 mi) from the beaches of Terfaya and Kadous. It was created out of parts of Aïn Taya in 1984. Currently, it is the site of the construction of 1853 homes.
