= Hammedi =

Coordinates: 36°40′37″N 3°16′03″E

Hammedi ⵃⴻⵎⵎⴰⴷⵉ حمادى
- Commune and town
- Interactive map of Hammedi
- Country: Algeria
- Province: Boumerdès Province

Population (1998)
  - Total: 27,972
- Time zone: UTC+1 (CET)

Hammedi is a town and commune in Boumerdès Province, Algeria. According to the 1998 census it has a population of 27,972.

== History ==
The commune of Hammadi is primarily populated by Arabophone Berbers, specifically the Sanhadja, descendants of the Zirids, a dynasty founded by Bologhine U Ziri. The very name of the commune alludes to the Hammadids, a dynasty established by Hammad ibn Buluggin, who separated from the Zirid kingdom. The inhabitants of the commune are still referred to by this name (Hammadids).

Although Arabized, the local population has managed to preserve its Berber traditions, both through their Algerian Arabic dialect, which is heavily influenced by Berber, and in their customs and tribal structures.

Historically, the people settled in the area and cultivated the land. It has always remained a rural commune. The various invasions and conquests over the centuries did not significantly alter the origins of its population, owing to their strong attachment to the land passed down through generations. They fought to protect their land and have always maintained their independence from foreign invaders, much like other Berber tribes.

== Notable people ==
- Mohamed Cherak, Algerian journalist.
