= Reghaïa =

Reghaïa بلدية الرغاية
- Municipality
- Commune of Reghaïa
- Location of Reghaïa within Algiers Province

- Location of Reghaïa within Algeria
- Coordinates: 36.7631°N 3.3426°E
- Country: Algeria
- Province: Algiers
- District: Rouïba

Government
  - PMA Seats: 11

Area
  - Total: 26.3 km^{2} (10.2 sq mi)
- Elevation: 14 m (46 ft)

Population (2008)
  - Total: 85,452
  - Density: 3,250/km^{2} (8,420/sq mi)
- Time zone: UTC+01 (CET)
- Postal code: 16108
- ONS code: 1643

Reghaïa is a municipality in Algiers Province, Algeria. It is located in Rouïba district and is the most populated municipality of the district.

== Geography ==
It is located in the northern part of the plain of Mitidja, with sandy beaches along the coast. It is home to a Ramsar-recognized humid marsh and a Réghaïa lake having an area of 185 acres (75 hectares) and a length of 2.5 kilometers (1.6 mi). A natural reserve is being built there. There is also a 600-metre-long (2,000-foot) island there: Hadjrat Bounattah/Ile Agueli, one kilometer (0.6 miles) from the beach of Reghaïa.

== History ==
Reghaïa original name are " re agha ", "region agha ", the urbanization of the area started with the arriving of the Ouled Hadjadj tribe, with origins from today's Morocco. During the start of the French rule in Algeria, Reghaïa came into existence as a district by an act signed by Napoleon III in 1858, and it became a purely agricultural colony of 3000 hectares (7413 acres) which were given to two French settler families Mercier and Saussine (the latter was Franco-American). The modern day municipality was created in 1974, 12 years after the Algerian independency, as it was cut out from the municipality of Rouïba to form its own defined territory, but still within the province of Algiers. In 1985, Reghaia, alongside Rouiba, Ain taya, Dergena and El Marsa were included to the newly created province of Boumerdes. This administrative reorganization was quite costly for the municipality of Reghaia, as huge part of its territory was used to form the newly created municipalities . In the late 1990s, a considerable part of its area was then again cut out in order to, alongside the newly created municipalities of Boudouaou, El Bahri, Ouled Hadadj and Heraoua, be included back to the province of Algiers.

== Economy ==
The southern part of the municipality is more of an important commercial center, with the northern part still being agricultural. There is also the industrial park of Rouïba-Reghaïa which covers 1,000 hectares (2,500 acres) and employs a quarter of the active population. Among some notable factories belong to Citroën and Danone.

The higher military school of the Air Defence Forces (école supérieure de la défense aérienne du territoire) is located here. It provides engineering training.

== Transport ==
Houari Boumediene Airport is located approximately 15 kilometres (9.3 miles) to the west. Its train station is considered to be the third main station in the district of Algiers. Most long destination trains stop at Reghaia station, such as the ones which go to Béjaïa, Constantine and Annaba. In addition to that, every 10 to 15 minutes, there is a commuter train to both Algiers or Boumerdes. The bus station is one of the busiest stations in Algiers, a lot of people from the surrounding municipalities such as, Boudouaou, Heraoua, Ouled Hadadj, Ouled Moussa and Boudouau El Bahri use Reghaia as the main transit station to various destinations, mainly Algiers.
