= Aïn Taya =

Aïn Taya عين طاية
- Commune
- Location within Algiers
- Coordinates: 36°47′30″N 3°17′20″E
- Country: Algeria
- Province: Algiers

Area
  - Land: 9.67 km^{2} (3.73 sq mi)

Population (2008)
  - Total: 34,501
  - Density: 3,567.8/km^{2} (9,241/sq mi)
- Time zone: UTC+1 (West Africa Time)

Aïn Taya is a suburb of Algiers, Algeria. It is located in the administrative constituency of Dar El Beïda in the Governorate of Greater Algiers. Its postal code is 16019 and its municipal code is 1638. Prior to its being part of the Governorate of Greater Algiers, it was part of Boumerdès Province with postal code 35310. The current president of the People's Municipal Assembly (mayor) is Abdelkader Rakkas (2017-2022). Aïn Taya has a budget of 46 million DZD.

== Demographics ==
Aïn Taya had a population of 34,501 at the 2008 census (3,568/km^{2}). An important part of the population is of Kabyle origin. Historical populations include:

- 78 families (1847)
- 1,666, of whom 549 were French (1870)
- 5,674, of whom 3,500 muslims
- 6,100 (1954)
- 13,700 (1987 census)
- 29,515 (1998 census)

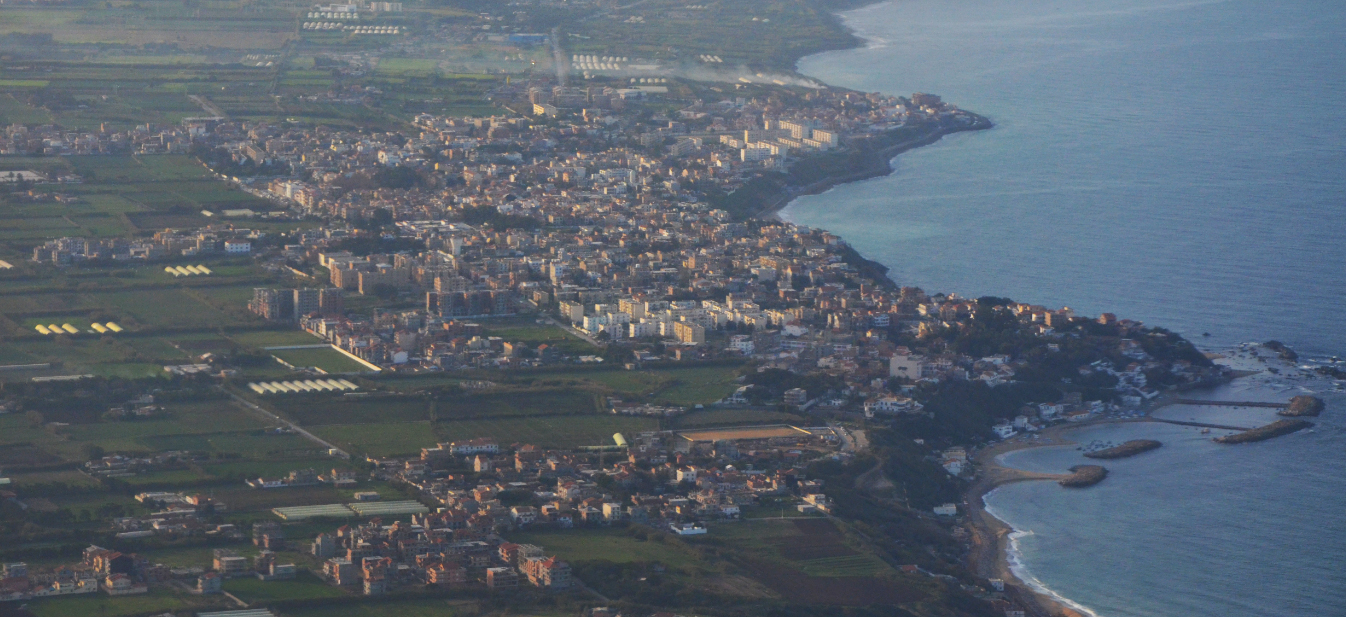
Aïn Taya

== Geography ==
The area of the municipality is 955 hectares, or 9,5 km2 (about 3.76 sq mi) of which 60% is used for agriculture. It also has 8 km (almost 5 mi) of coastline located a few kilometers east of the easternmost point of the gulf of Algiers, on the Mediterranean Sea.

== Railway ==
In 1914, it was connected to Algiers by a 1055 mm gauge local railway Chemins de Fer sur Routes d´Algerie. The trains departed from Algiers at 6.09, 13.29, and 17.40 arriving in Aïn-Taya at 8.21, 15.37 and 19.57. The return workings departed from Aïn-Taya at 5.37, 12.53 and 17.13 arriving in Algiers at 7.45, 15.05 and 19.25. The rail distance was 32 km (20 miles). This service was hauled by a Decauville-built narrow gauge steam locomotives. The C.F.R.A. also operated lines from Algiers to Rovigo and via Gyotville to Kolea (44 km) and Casiglione (47 km).

== Former mayors ==
This is a list of Aïn Taya's mayors during French colonial times.

- Joseph Guyot 1870-1878
- Jean Dabadie 1879-1884
- Casimir Fabre 1884-1891
- Paul Oudaille 1891-1895
- Désiré Dulin 1896-1898
- Joseph Chabert 1898-1904
- Paul Fabre 1904-1910
- Charles Pellegrin 1910-1919
- Michel Sinters 1920-1935
- Auguste Allier 1935-1945
- Emile Bertoni 1945-1948
- Hector Buchardt 1948-1949
- ? Gadrel 1949-1962
