= Ouled Moussa =

Coordinates: 36°40′59″N 3°22′05″E

- Commune and town
- Interactive map of Ouled Moussa
- Country: Algeria
- Province: Boumerdès Province

Population (2008)
  - Total: 40,692
- Time zone: UTC+1 (CET)

Ouled Moussa is a town and commune in Boumerdès Province, Algeria. According to the 2008 census it has a population of 40,692.
