= Khemis El-Khechna =

Coordinates: 36°39′00″N 3°19′50″E

Khemis El-Khachna
- Commune and town
- Country: Algeria
- Province: Boumerdès Province

Population (2008)
  - Total: 46,965
- Time zone: UTC+1 (CET)

Khemis El-Khachna is a town and commune in Boumerdès Province, Algeria. According to the 2008 census it has a population of 46,965.

== Geography ==
The town of Khemis el Kkhechna is built upon haouch belakehal, former property of the area of the khachnas of the plain. The settlers used the Arabic word fendek to locate the area that will take the name of Fondouk. A hotel existed there before 1830, in this hotel stayed the surveyors to establish the rise and the delimitation of the Arab properties of the region of the khachnas of the plain and the khachnas of the mountain. On the territory of this commune is buried sidi Bannour one of the great imam ibadite. An old historic well called bir griche bears the same name as another well located at sidi m'hammed in Algiers.

== History ==
Khemis El Khechna, formerly Fondouk was created in 1845 by decree of Louis Philippe. She was promoted to town in 1856; his first mayor is a man named Raboil. The history of this town dates back to 1830, when a hotel was built for passengers passing through the area. The road to Constantine passed through this locality. The inhabitants of the area are called khachnis which means hard.

== Economy ==
Fondouk was considered one of the richest regions of Algeria according to the articles published in L'Echo d'Alger during the 1950s. Most of this wealth came from vineyards and the hamiz irrigation dam. In the same way his fisheries were very famous so called "Peaches of Fondouk".

== Notable people ==
- Othmane Senadjki, Algerian journalist.
