= List of USM Alger seasons =

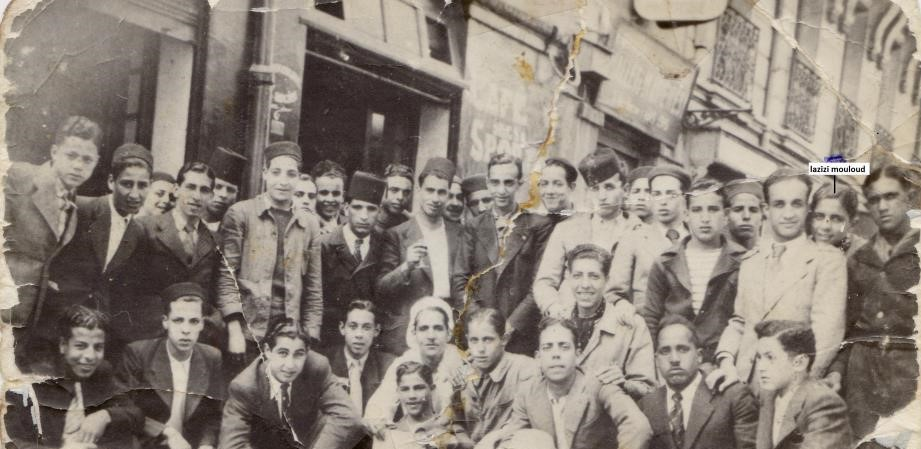
The Founders of USM Alger on July 6, 1937.

Union sportive de la médina d'Alger is an Algerian professional football club based in Algiers, Algiers Province. The club was formed in Casbah in 1937 as Union Sportive Musulmane d'Alger, and played their first competitive match in 1937, when they entered the 1937–38 Ligue d'Alger Troisième Division. The club was renamed Union sportive de la médina d'Alger in 1989.

The club has won a total of 18 major trophies, including the national championship 7 times also won the Algerian Cup a record 8 times, the Algerian Super Cup 1 time, and the UAFA Club Cup 1 time Al Ittihad reached the CAF Champions League final for the first time in 2015 but was defeated against TP Mazembe. The club has also never been out of the top two divisions of Algerian football since entering the Football League.

This is a list of the seasons played by USM Alger from 1962 when the club first entered a league competition to the most recent seasons. The club's achievements in all major national and international competitions as well as the top scorers are listed. Top scorers in bold were also top scorers of Ligue 1. The list is separated into three parts, coinciding with the three major episodes of Algerian football:

== History ==
The club was founded in 1937 as Union Sportive Musulmane d'Alger (USMA), following considerable difficulties with the colonial administration over the use of the word Musulmane. Despite these difficulties, the club began competing during the 1937–38 season in the third division. Results from the club's colonial-period campaigns are not included in the modern league tables, as USMA competed in competitions organized by the colonial football authorities, notably the Ligue d'Alger, the Coupe de la Ligue, and the Coupe de la Solidarité. USMA did not participate in the major North African interregional competitions of the period, such as the North African Championship and the North African Cup.

Following Algerian independence, USM Alger became the first national champions of Algeria, defeating MC Alger 3–0 in the final of the 1963 Championnat National 1. The club subsequently established itself as one of the most successful teams in the [Algerian Cup], having reached the final 19 times and won ten titles. USMA has also finished runners-up nine times, including five consecutive defeats in the finals between 1969 and 1973. USM Alger became the first club to win the Algerian Cup while competing in the second division, achieving this feat in 1981. It also became the only Algerian club to win the national championship immediately after promotion from the second division, doing so in the 1995–96 season.

In the early 2000s, USM Alger achieved a period of particular success. The club won consecutive league and cup doubles in the 2001–02 and 2002–03 seasons, becoming only the fourth club to win two consecutive Algerian league titles. No Algerian club has won the league championship for three consecutive seasons or more. USM Alger also participated in the first Algerian Super Cup final in 1981, losing 3–1 to RC Kouba. The club later won the competition twice, in 2013 and 2016. At continental level, USM Alger made its African debut in 1982, when it participated in the Cup Winners' Cup. In 1997, the club became the first Algerian team to participate in the Champions League following the competition's reorganization and renaming in its modern format.

== Seasons ==
=== Before independence ===
Below, the USM Alger season-by-season record before independence in the French Algeria period :

(France) FFF - season-by-season record of Union Sportive Musulmane d'Alger
Season	League of Algiers											Forconi Cup
Season	Division	Pos.	Pts	P	W	D	L	F	A	GD	Goalscorer	Forconi Cup
Union Sportive Musulmane d'Alger (USMA)
**1937-38**	Quatrième division	0	0	14	7	4	3	34	22	+12	-	-
**1938-39**	Troisième Division	2nd	25	10	7	1	2	15	7	+8	-	-
**1939-40**	Première Division	6th	19	12	2	1	9	18	21	-3	Abdellah Betouche (6)	Round of 16
**1940-41**	Troisième Division	3rd	22	10	5	2	3	24	10	+14	-	Second Round
**1941-42**	Troisième Division	7th	22	14	3	2	9	20	23	−3	-	Second Round
**1942-43**		0	0	0	0	0	0	0	0	0	-	-
**1943-44**		0	0	0	0	0	0	0	0	0	-	-
**1944-45**	Première Division	**1st**	37	14	11	2	1	45	12	+33	-	Second Round
**1945-46**		0	0	0	0	0	0	0	0	0	-	Quarter-finals
**1946-47**		0	0	0	0	0	0	0	0	0	-	Second Round
**1947-48**	Première Division		44	18	13	2	3	39	10	+29	Rabah Zouaoui (15)	Quarter-finals
**1948-49**	Première Division	**1st**	36	18	6	6	6	24	22	+2	-	Fourth Round
**1949-50**	Première Division	5th	38	18	7	6	5	28	25	+3	Rabah Zouaoui (15)	Fifth Round
**1950-51**	Première Division	7th	35	18	6	5	7	27	26	+1	Hacène Chabri (8)	Third Round
**1951-52**	Première Division	**1st**	49	18	14	3	1	51	18	+33	Rabah Zouaoui (12)	Second Round
**1952-53**	Première Division	8th	34	18	4	8	6	22	27	−5	-	Fourth Round
**1953-54**	Première Division	8th	28	18	3	4	11	21	38	−17	Zoubir Naït Kaci (6)	Third Round
**1954-55**	Première Division	10th	25	18	2	3	13	12	39	−27	Hamid Chibane (5)	Third round
**1955-56**	Deuxième Division	8th	27	18	5	5	8	22	39	−17	Mouloud Timsit (4)	Withdrawal
No competition is played by the muslim clubs between 1956 and 1962 by order of the FLN (Algerian War)

=== After independence ===
Below, the USM Alger season-by-season record after independence of Algeria :

Season	League									Cup	Other	Africa		Top goalscorer(s) (Note: Goals in all competitions (Algerian Ligue Professionnelle 1, Algerian Cup, League Cup, African and Super Cup) are counted.)		Ref.
Season	Division	Pos	Pts	P	W	D	L	GF	GA	Cup	Other	Africa		Name	Goals	
1962–63	Critérium Honneur	**1st**	70	24	21	2	1	95	11	SF						
1963–64	Division Honneur	3rd	74	30	19	6	5	69	23	SF				Abderrahmane Meziani	19	
1964–65	National	16th	54	30	8	8	14	36	44	R64				Abderrahmane Meziani	11	
1965–66	National 2	2nd	73	30	18	7	5	53	22	R16						
1966–67	National II	5th	36	18	6	6	6	26	20	SF				Abderrahmane Meziani	8	
1967–68	National II	5th	45	22	8	7	7	29	23	R16				Abderrahmane Meziani	7	
1968–69	National II	2nd	51	22	11	7	4	44	26	RU				Mouldi Aissaoui	11	
1969–70	National I	5th	43	22	7	7	8	34	32	RU				Kamel Tchalabi	10	
1970–71	National I	5th	45	22	7	9	6	37	32	RU				Meziani, Tchalabi	10	
1971–72	National I	15th	55	30	9	7	14	38	47	RU				Abderrahmane Meziani	8	
1972–73	National II	2nd	71	27	19	6	2	51	16	RU						
1973–74	National II	**1st**	71	26	21	3	2	-	-	R32				Djamel Zidane	15	
1974–75	National I	5th	63	30	13	7	10	48	36	R32				Zidane, Guedioura	10	
1975–76	National I	4th	66	30	14	8	8	52	29	R32						
1976–77	National I	11th	47	26	7	7	12	32	36	QF						
1977–78	Division 1	5th	54	26	11	6	9	40	26	RU						
1978–79	Division 1	12th	48	26	7	8	11	30	40	QF						
1979–80	Division 1	15th	54	30	7	11	12	30	35	RU						
1980–81	Division 2	**1st**	54	22	12	8	2	49	21	**W**						
1981–82	Division 1	9th	59	30	9	11	10	24	30	QF	RU	Cup Winners' Cup	QF			
1982–83	Division 1	16th	56	30	8	10	12	21	31	R16				Nacer Guedioura	7	
1983–84	Division 2	4th	68	30	13	12	5	45	23	R2						
1984–85	Division 2	2nd	69	29	13	11	5	39	20	R32						
1985–86	Division 2	2nd	69	30	14	11	5	41	22	R32						
1986–87	Division 2	**1st**	46	30	19	8	3	41	15	R64						
1987–88	Division 1	7th	35	34	11	13	10	35	30	**W**				Fawzi Benkhalidi	9	
1988–89	Division 1	13th	28	30	9	10	11	27	34	R16		Cup Winners' Cup	QF	Tarek Hadj Adlane	7	
1989–90	Division 1	16th	23	30	8	7	15	23	39	NP				Tarek Hadj Adlane	10	
1990–91	Division 2	4th	34	30	12	10	8	40	25	QF				Tarek Hadj Adlane	13	
1991–92	Division 2	3rd	34	30	13	8	9	34	23	R64						
1992–93	Division 2	7th	31	30	10	11	9	33	25	NP						
1993–94	Division 2	2nd	48	32	21	6	5	52	12	R64						
1994–95	Division 2	**1st**	50	32	20	10	2	54	29	R2				Azzedine Rahim	??	
1995–96	Division 1	**1st**	60	30	19	3	8	39	24	R64	Grp			Azzedine Rahim	11	
1996–97	Division 1	3rd	49	30	14	7	9	32	30	**W**		Champions League	Grp (Note: The competition ended in the following season)	Tarek Hadj Adlane	16	
1997–98	Division 1	2nd	25	15	6	7	2	18	13	R16	QF	Cup Winners' Cup	QF	Tarek Hadj Adlane	6	
1998–99	Super Division	4th	44	26	12	8	6	32	17	**W**		CAF Cup	QF	Tarek Hadj Adlane	17	
1999–00	Super Division	12th	21	22	6	3	13	15	27	R16	SF	Cup Winners' Cup	Dis	Athmane Samir Amirat	5	
2000–01	Super Division	2nd	55	30	15	10	5	51	28	**W**				Tarek Hadj Adlane	14	
2001–02	Super Division	**1st**	57	30	17	6	7	37	24	R32		Cup Winners' Cup	SF	Rabie Benchergui	12	
2002–03	Division 1	**1st**	58	30	17	7	6	52	17	**W**		Champions League	SF	**Moncef Ouichaoui**	**22**	
2003–04	Division 1	2nd	58	30	17	7	6	49	23	**W**		Champions League	Grp	Rabie Benchergui	15	
2004–05	Division 1	**1st**	67	30	21	4	5	55	27	R64		Champions League	R2	Billel Dziri	11	
2004–05	Division 1	**1st**	67	30	21	4	5	55	27	R64		CAF Confederation Cup	PO	Billel Dziri	11	
2005–06	Division 1	2nd	57	30	18	6	6	50	30	RU		Champions League	R1	Moulay Haddou	12	
2006–07	Division 1	4th	47	30	13	8	9	32	25	RU		Champions League	PR	Mintou Doucoure	7	
2007–08	Division 1	4th	42	30	12	6	12	32	27	R16		Arab Champions League	Grp	Amar Ammour	12	
2008–09	Division 1	6th	48	32	13	9	10	38	31	R64		Arab Champions League	R16	Ali Rial	7	
2009–10	Division 1	4th	53	34	14	11	9	47	33	R16				Cheikh Hamidi	15	
2010–11	Ligue 1	9th	38	30	9	11	10	32	28	R64				Noureddine Daham	11	
2011–12	Ligue 1	3rd	52	30	15	7	8	37	25	QF				Lamouri Djediat	12	
2012–13	Ligue 1	4th	51	30	15	6	9	32	15	**W**		Confederation Cup	R2	Noureddine Daham	12	
2012–13	Ligue 1	4th	51	30	15	6	9	32	15	**W**		UAFA Club Cup	**W**	Noureddine Daham	12	
2013–14	Ligue 1	**1st**	68	30	20	8	2	49	21	R32	**W**			Ziaya, Andria, Gasmi	6	
2014–15	Ligue 1	8th	41	30	10	11	9	35	27	R16	RU	Champions League	RU	Youcef Belaïli	8	
2015–16	Ligue 1	**1st**	58	30	17	7	6	49	31	R64				Mohamed Seguer	12	
2016–17	Ligue 1	**3rd**	50	30	14	8	8	50	31	R16	**W**	Champions League	SF	Mohamed Rabie Meftah	11	
2017–18	Ligue 1	6th	42	30	11	9	10	43	35	R16		Confederation Cup	QF	**Oussama Darfalou**	**26**	
2018–19	Ligue 1	**1st**	53	30	15	8	7	49	29	R16		Arab Club Champions Cup	R2	Prince Ibara	10	
2019–20	Ligue 1 (Note: On March 15, 2020, the Ligue de Football Professionnel (LFP) decided to halt the season due to the COVID-19 pandemic in Algeria. On July 29, 2020, the LFP declared that season is over and CR Belouizdad to be the champion, the promotion of four teams from the League 2, and scrapping the relegation for the current season.)	6th (Note: USM Alger were deducted 3 points due to their withdrawal in their game against MC Alger. The decision has been appealed to the Court of Arbitration for Sport. On August 28, 2020, after postponing several times the final decision was made without appeal, which is to return the three points and repeat the match.)	32	22	9	5	7	25	22	R32		Champions League	Grp	Aymen Mahious	12	
2020–21	Ligue 1	4th	65	38	19	8	11	62	39	NP	RU			Ismail Belkacemi	17	
2020–21	Ligue 1	4th	65	38	19	8	11	62	39	NP	SF			Ismail Belkacemi	17	
2021–22	Ligue 1	4th	57	34	15	12	7	45	22	NP				Mahious, Belkacemi	8	
2022–23	Ligue 1	11th	40	30	11	7	11	31	27	R64		Confederation Cup	**W**	Aymen Mahious	11	
2023–24	Ligue 1	4th	49	30	15	4	11	40	32	SF		Confederation Cup	SF	**Ismail Belkacemi**	**17**	
2023–24	Ligue 1	4th	49	30	15	4	11	40	32	SF		CAF Super Cup	**W**	**Ismail Belkacemi**	**17**	
2024–25	Ligue 1	7th	40	30	10	10	10	26	26	**W**		Confederation Cup	QF	Ismaïl Belkacemi	10	
2025–26	Ligue 1	10th	39	30	8	15	7	34	29	**W**	RU	Confederation Cup	**W**	Ahmed Khaldi	13	
2026–27	Ligue 1									R64	F	Confederation Cup	R2			
2026–27	Ligue 1									R64	F	CAF Super Cup	**W**			

== Key ==
Key to league record:

- P = Played
- W = Games won
- D = Games drawn
- L = Games lost
- GF = Goals for
- GA = Goals against
- Pts = Points
- Pos = Final position

Key to divisions:

- 1 = Ligue 1
- 2 = Ligue 2

Key to rounds:

- DNE = Did not enter
- NP = Not played
- PR = Preliminary round
- Grp = Group stage
- R1 = First Round
- R2 = Second Round
- PO = Play-off round
- R32 = Round of 32
- R16 = Round of 16
- QF = Quarter-finals
- SF = Semi-finals
- RU = Runners-up
- W = Winners

Champions	Runners-up	Promoted	Relegated

Division shown in bold to indicate a change in division.
Top scorers shown in bold are players who were also top scorers in their division that season.

== Statistics ==
=== Algeria ===
As of 6 June 2026:

FAF competitions
Competition	Seasons	Played	Won	Drawn	Lost	Goals For	Goals Against	Last season played
Algerian Ligue Professionnelle 1	46	1337	562	367	408	1725	1336	2025–26
Algerian Ligue 2 (Note: No statistics on the Algerian Ligue 2 for the seasons 1972–73 and 1973–74.)	16	387	190	122	75	580	306	1994–95
Algerian Cup (Note: No statistics on the Algerian Cup for the seasons, 1993–94 and 1994–95.)	60	218	144	39	36	403	163	2025–26
Algerian Super Cup	6	6	2	0	4	6	7	2025
Algerian League Cup (defunct)	4	25	9	8	8	35	22	2020–21
**Total**	**132**	**1973**	**907**	**536**	**531**	**2749**	**1834**	

=== Africa ===
As of 16 May 2026:

CAF competitions
Competition	Seasons	Played	Won	Drawn	Lost	Goals For	Goals Against	Last season played
Champions League	9	80	37	19	24	132	82	2019–20
CAF Cup Winners' Cup (defunct)	5	25	13	4	8	40	25	2002
CAF Confederation Cup	7	70	32	21	17	93	55	2025–26
CAF Cup (defunct)	1	6	4	0	2	13	6	1999
CAF Super Cup	1	1	1	0	0	1	0	2023
**Total**	**23**	**182**	**87**	**45**	**50**	**279**	**168**	

=== Non-CAF competitions ===
As of 10 December 2018:

Non-CAF competitions
Competition	Seasons	Played	Won	Drawn	Lost	Goals For	Goals Against	Last season played
Arab Champions League	5	29	14	8	7	46	34	2018–19
Maghreb Cup Winners Cup (defunct)	2	4	1	0	3	3	6	1970
**Total**	**7**	**33**	**15**	**8**	**10**	**49**	**38**	
**All-Total**	**156**	**2097**	**972**	**556**	**569**	**2966**	**1966**	
