= 1987–88 USM Alger season =

USM Alger
1987–88 season
- President: Abdesslem Bensahli
- Head coach: Djamel Keddou & Mustapha Aksouh
- Stadium: Omar Hamadi Stadium
- Division 1: 7th
- Algerian Cup: Winners
- Top goalscorer: League: Fawzi Benkhalidi (8 goals); All: Tarek Hadj Adlane; Fawzi Benkhalidi (8 goals)

In the 1987–88 season, USM Alger is competing in the Division 1 for the 17th time, as well as the Algerian Cup. They will be competing in Division 1 and the Algerian Cup.

== Summary season ==
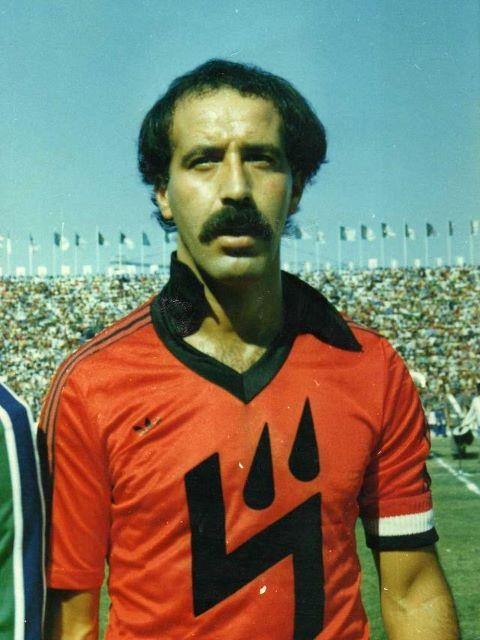
Djamel Keddou, was an USM Alger player and manager, he led USM Alger to the Algerian Cup in 1981 and 1988.

On July 5, 1987, USK Alger celebrated its 50th anniversary and the opportunity to bring everyone together has not been seized. Many of these people did not participate in this celebration. From the founding father Sid Ahmed Kemmat to the sympathetic son like Boualem Rahma the Chaabi singer, However they forgot many faces that presented to the club that the reasons the party was not complete. After that the USM Alger's results fluctuated between ups and downs for a decade and in spite of that and in the 1987–88 season the club returned to the first division with a young squad, mostly from Reserve team under the leadership of coach and former captain of the team Djamel Keddou, and despite the lack of experience, USM Alger managed to win the Algerian Cup for the second time after winning against CR Belouizdad with penalties at Stade 5 Juillet 1962 which is the fourth final between the two teams and the first victory for USMA after three defeats, after the match Amar Kabrane was subjected to great criticism and was accused of deliberately wasting the penalty shootout, especially since he then moved to them, USM Alger guarantee the qualification card for the African Cup Winners Cup for the second time.

== Squad list ==
Players and squad numbers last updated on 1 September 1987.
Note: Flags indicate national team as has been defined under FIFA eligibility rules. Players may hold more than one non-FIFA nationality.

No.	Nat.	Position	Name	Date of birth (age)	Signed from
?	(Algeria)	CB	Redouane Bellemou	26 July 1966 (aged 21)	Youth system
?	(Algeria)	GK	Moulooud Beltitane	20 January 1970 (aged 17)	Youth system
?	(Algeria)	LB	Farid Bengana	14 July 1963 (aged 24)	Youth system
?	(Algeria)	RW	Fawzi Benkhalidi	3 February 1963 (aged 24)	(Algeria) WA Boufarik
1	(Algeria)	GK	Yacine Bentalaa	24 September 1955 (aged 31)	(Algeria) RC Kouba
?	(Algeria)		Salah Bougerra	22 January 1962 (aged 25)	
?	(Algeria)	CM	Salim Boutamine	3 April 1962 (aged 25)	Youth system
?	(Algeria)		Rafik Bouchtout	20 May 1968 (aged 19)	Youth system
?	(Algeria)		Nacereddine El Aouada	?	(Algeria) MC Alger
11	(Algeria)	RW	Tarek Hadj Adlane	10 December 1965 (aged 21)	Youth system
?	(Algeria)		Khaled Fodil	29 October 1967 (aged 19)	Youth system
?	(Algeria)		Ramdane Hammaz	2 January 1968 (aged 19)	Youth system
?	(Algeria)		Samir Keddou	21 June 1961 (aged 26)	(Algeria) MC Alger (Youth system)
?	(Algeria)	CB	Rabah Kourifa	10 March 1963 (aged 24)	Youth system
?	(Algeria)	CM	Amirouche Laalili	29 February 1964 (aged 23)	Youth system
?	(Algeria)	CM	Farid Mouaci	27 February 1964 (aged 23)	Youth system
11	(Algeria)		Athmane Nourine	16 May 1965 (aged 22)	Youth system
?	(Algeria)		Samir Osmane	17 November 1964 (aged 22)	Youth system
?	(Algeria)		Salim Slimani	24 April 1964 (aged 23)	Youth system
?	(Algeria)		Réda Saadedine	1 January 1962 (aged 25)	
?	(Algeria)	RB	M'hamed Soumatia	21 October 1958 (aged 28)	Youth system
8	(Algeria)	RW	Boualem Baâziz	18 January 1960 (aged 27)	

== Competitions ==
=== Overview ===
Competition	Record							
Competition	G	W	D	L	GF	GA	GD	Win %
Division 1	34	11	13	10	35	30	+5	32.35
Algerian Cup	6	4	2	0	5	1	+4	66.67
Total	40	15	15	10	40	31	+9	37.50

=== Division 1 ===
==== League table ====
Pos	Team	Pld	W	D	L	GF	GA	GD	Pts	Qualification or relegation
5	Union d'El Harrach	34	8	19	7	31	25	+6	35	
6	Université d'Annaba	34	14	7	13	40	35	+5	35	
7	Union d'Alger	34	11	13	10	35	30	+5	35	Algerian Cup Winner, qualified for Cup Winners' Cup
8	Jeunesse de Tiaret	34	15	5	14	38	36	+2	35	
9	Union d'Aïn Béïda	34	13	9	12	27	27	0	35	

Source: rsssf.com

=== Results by round ===
Round	1	2	3	4	5	6	7	8	9	10	11	12	13	14	15	16	17	18	19	20	21	22	23	24	25	26	27	28	29	30	31	32	33	34
Ground	H	A	H	A	H	A	H	A	H	A	H	A	H	A	H	A	H	A	H	A	H	A	H	A	H	A	H	A	H	A	H	A	H	A
Result	W	D	D	L	D	D	D	W	W	L	W	L	W	L	D	D	L	L	W	D	W	D	D	D	W	L	W	D	W	L	W	L	D	L
Position																																		7

Source: Competitive matches
A = Away; H = Home; W = Win; D = Draw; L = Loss

=== Matches ===
10 September 1987 Round 1	Union d'Alger	1–0	Université d'Annaba	Algiers
16:00	Bengana 83'	Report		Stadium: Stade du 5 Juillet; Attendance: 10,000; Referee: Benmohamed
Note: Lineup for USK Alger - , , , , , , , , , , .

18 September 1987 Round 2	Union d'El Harrach	0–0	Union d'Alger	Algiers
		Report		Stadium: Stade du 5 Juillet; Referee: Mohamed Hansal
Note: Lineup for USK Alger - , , , , , , , , , , .

5 October 1987 Round 3	Union d'Alger	0–0	Association d'Oran	Bologhine
				Stadium: Omar Hamadi Stadium
Note: Lineup for USK Alger - , , , , , , , , , , .

2 October 1987 Round 4	Espérance d'Aïn M'lila	1–0	Union d'Alger	Aïn M'lila
		Report		Stadium: Stade des Frères Demane Debih
Note: Lineup for USK Alger - , , , , , , , , , , .

9 October 1987 Round 5	Union d'Alger	0–0	Jeunesse de Bordj Menaïel	Bologhine
				Stadium: Omar Hamadi Stadium
Note: Lineup for USK Alger - , , , , , , , , , , .

15 October 1987 Round 6	Jeunesse de Belcourt	1–1	Union d'Alger	Algiers
			27' Lalili	Stadium: Stade du 5 Juillet
Note: Lineup for USK Alger - , , , , , , , , , , .

23 October 1987 Round 7	Union d'Alger	1–1	Mouloudia d'Alger	Algiers
	Lalili (red card) 35'; Aksouh (Coach) (red card) 45'; Mouaci 50'		15' (pen.) Sebbar	Stadium: Stade du 5 Juillet; Referee: Mohamed Kouradji; Assistant referees: Hafirassou, Bouicha
Note: Lineup for USK Alger - Bentalaâ (c), Soumatia, Kourifa, Bouguerra, Bellemou, Mouaci (Keddou Samir 75'), Hadj Adlane, Lalili, Baâziz, Benkhalidi, Saâdedine.

30 October 1987 Round 8	Widad de Tlemcen	0–2	Union d'Alger	Tlemcen
			Benkhalidi 23', 70'	Stadium: Stade Akid Lotfi
Note: Lineup for USK Alger - , , , , , , , , , , .

6 November 1987 Round 9	Union d'Alger	3–2	Union d'Aïn Béïda	Bologhine
	Mouaci 36' (pen.), 79'; Benkhalidi 53'			Stadium: Omar Hamadi Stadium
Note: Lineup for USK Alger - , , , , , , , , , , .

12 November 1987 Round 10	Olympique de Chlef	1–0	Union d'Alger	Chlef
				Stadium: Stade Maâmar Sahli
Note: Lineup for USK Alger - , , , , , , , , , , .

16 November 1987 Round 11	Union d'Alger	1–0	Mouloudia d'Oran	Bologhine
				Stadium: Omar Hamadi Stadium
Note: Lineup for USK Alger - , , , , , , , , , , .

20 November 1987 Round 12	Flambeau de Skikda	2–1	Union d'Alger	Skikda
	Mordi 70'; Guerrili 75'	Report	Hadj Adlane 30'	Stadium: Stade 20 Août 1955; Referee: Saâda, Ait Saâdi, Namaoui
Note: Lineup for USK Alger - Bentalaa, Soumatia, Kourifa, Bengana, Bellemou, Bougerra, Hadj Adlane, Laalili, Baâziz, Mouaci, Saadedine.

27 November 1987 Round 13	Union d'Alger	3–0	Entente de Collo	Bologhine
	Saadedine 35'; Hadj Adlane 64'; Benkhalidi 67'			Stadium: Omar Hamadi Stadium
Note: Lineup for USK Alger - , , , , , , , , , , .

31 December 1987 Round 14	Entente de Sétif	2–0	Union d'Alger	Sétif
				Stadium: Stade 8 Mai 1945
Note: Lineup for USK Alger - , , , , , , , , , , .

18 December 1987 Round 15	Union d'Alger	0–0	JE Tizi Ouzou	Algiers
				Stadium: Stade du 5 Juillet; Attendance: 17 634; Referee: Mohamed Hansal
Note: Lineup for USK Alger - Bentalaa, Soumatia, Kourifa, Bengana, Laalili, Bougerra, Hadj Adlane, Mouaci, Baâziz, Benkhalidi, Saâdedine.

21 December 1987 Round 16	Rapid de Relizane	0–0	Union d'Alger	Relizane
				Stadium: Stade Tahar Zoughari
Note: Lineup for USK Alger - , , , , , , , , , , .

25 December 1987 Round 17	Union d'Alger	2–3	Jeunesse de Tiaret	Bologhine
	Hadj Adlane 40'; Mouaci 79'	Report; Live TV: EPTV	Mourad Ardjaoui 39', 70'; Hocine 58'	Stadium: Omar Hamadi Stadium
Note: Lineup for USK Alger - , , , , , , , , , , .

21 January 1988 Round 18	Université d'Annaba	1–0	Union d'Alger	Annaba
				Stadium: May 19, 1956 Stadium
Note: Lineup for USK Alger - , , , , , , , , , , .

5 February 1988 Round 19	Union d'Alger	1–0	Union d'El Harrach	Algiers
	Benkhalidi 85'			Stadium: Stade du 5 Juillet; Referee: Mohamed Hansal
Note: Lineup for USK Alger - , , , , , , , , , , .

12 February 1988 Round 20	Association d'Oran	0–0	Union d'Alger	Oran
				Stadium: Stade Ahmed Zabana; Referee: Kourase; Assistant referees: Belatriche, Alouane
Note: Lineup for USK Alger - , , , , , , , , , , .

19 February 1988 Round 21	Union d'Alger	2–1	Espérance d'Aïn M'lila	Bologhine
	Mouassi 17'; Hadj Adlane 25'			Stadium: Omar Hamadi Stadium
Note: Lineup for USK Alger - , , , , , , , , , , .

3 March 1988 Round 22	Jeunesse de Bordj Menaïel	0–0	Union d'Alger	Bordj Menaïel
				Stadium: Stade Salah Takjrad
Note: Lineup for USK Alger - , , , , , , , , , , .

11 March 1988 Round 23	Union d'Alger	0–0	Jeunesse de Belcourt	Algiers
				Stadium: Stade du 5 Juillet
Note: Lineup for USK Alger - , , , , , , , , , , .

8 April 1988 Round 24	Mouloudia d'Alger	1–1	Union d'Alger	Algiers
	Djahmoun 80'		85' Baaziz	Stadium: Stade du 5 Juillet; Referee: Mohamed Sendid; Assistant referees: Benmohamed, Belghecham
Note: Lineup for USK Alger - Bentalâa (c), Kourifa, Kouici, Bengana, Bellemou Redouane, Mouaci, Hadj Adlane, Lalili, Baâziz, Benkhalidi, Nourine.

14 April 1988 Round 25	Union d'Alger	2–1	Widad de Tlemcen	Algiers
	Benkhalidi 2'; Nourine 16'	Report	Chiha 23'	Stadium: Stade du 5 Juillet; Attendance: 10,000; Referee: Bahloul; Assistant referees: Aber, Khabbeche
Note: Lineup for USK Alger - , , , , , , , , , , .

22 April 1988 Round 26	Union d'Aïn Béïda	1–0	Union d'Alger	Aïn Béïda
				Stadium: Stade du 24 avril
Note: Lineup for USK Alger - , , , , , , , , , , .

29 April 1988 Round 27	Union d'Alger	2–0	Olympique de Chlef	Bologhine
	Baâziz (?); Nourine (?)			Stadium: Omar Hamadi Stadium
Note: Lineup for USK Alger - , , , , , , , , , , .

13 May 1988 Round 28	Mouloudia d'Oran	1–1	Union d'Alger	Oran
	Meziane 13'		75' Hadj Adlane	Stadium: Stade Ahmed Zabana
Note: Lineup for USK Alger - , , , , , , , , , , .

20 May 1988 Round 29	Union d'Alger	3–1	Flambeau de Skikda	Bologhine
	Hadj Adlane 44'; Benkhalidi 48'; Nourine 76'		49' Mouldi	Stadium: Omar Hamadi Stadium; Referee: Saàda, Belbacher, Athmane
Note: Lineup for USK Alger - , , , , , , , , , , .

30 May 1988 Round 30	Entente de Collo	2–1	Union d'Alger	Collo
				Stadium: Stade Benjamâa Amar
Note: Lineup for USK Alger - , , , , , , , , , , .

20 June 1988 Round 31	Union d'Alger	2–0	Entente de Sétif	Bologhine
	Mouaci 80'; Hadj Adlane 88'			Stadium: Omar Hamadi Stadium
Note: Lineup for USK Alger - , , , , , , , , , , .

17 June 1988 Round 32	JE Tizi Ouzou	2–1	Union d'Alger	Tizi Ouzou
	Meftah 8' (yellow card) 62'; Aït Tahar 55'	Report	Benkhalidi 39'	Stadium: Stade du 1er Novembre 1954; Attendance: 12,000; Referee: Mohammed Memoune; Assistant referees: Tiouri, Hafirassou
Note: Lineup for USK Alger - Bentalaa, Soumatia, Kourifa, Bengana, Bellemou, Mouaci, Hadj Adlane, Laalili (Saâdedine, 63), Baâziz, Benkhalidi, Nourine.

1 July 1988 Round 33	Union d'Alger	2–2	Rapid de Relizane	Bologhine
	Baaziz 18', 29'	Report	Hamlili 5'; Chelaoua 80'	Stadium: Omar Hamadi Stadium; Referee: Mohamed Kouradji; Assistant referees: Bahloul, Aber
Note: Lineup for USK Alger - , , , , , , , , , , .

5 July 1988 Round 34	Jeunesse de Tiaret	4–2	Union d'Alger	Tiaret
				Stadium: Stade de Fraternité
Note: Lineup for USK Alger - , , , , , , , , , , .

=== Algerian Cup ===
29 January 1988 Round of 64	USK Alger	0–0 (a.e.t.) (3–0 p)	IRB El-Biar	Algiers
				Stadium: Stade 5 Juillet 1962
Note: Lineup for USK Alger - , , , , , , , , , , .

26 February 1988 Round of 32	USK Alger	1–0	CS Constantine	Annaba
	Baaziz 28'			Stadium: Stade 19 Mai 1956
Note: Lineup for USK Alger - , , , , , , , , , , .

25 April 1988 Round of 16	USK Alger	1–0	USM Aïn Beïda	Sétif
	Hadj Adlane (40̝)			Stadium: Stade 8 Mai 1945
Note: Lineup for USK Alger - , , , , , , , , , , .

6 May 1988 Quarter-finals	USK Alger	2–1	RC Kouba	Algiers
	Nourine 12'; Hadj Adlane 67'		Hamada 54'	Stadium: Stade 5 Juillet 1962; Attendance: 40,000; Referee: Kourase, Kouradji, Belatréche
Note: Lineup for USK Alger - Bentalaa, Soumatia, Kourifa, Bengana, Bellemou, Mouaci, Hadj Adlane, Laalili, Baâziz, Boutamine (Benkhalidi), Nourine.

27 May 1988 Semi-finals	USK Alger	1–0	MC Oran	Annaba
00:00	El-Ouazzani 48' (o.g.)	Report	Benmimoun (yellow card) 86'	Stadium: Stade 19 Mai 1956; Referee: Mohammed Memoune
Note: Lineup for USK Alger - Bentalaa, Kourifa, Bengana, Soumatia, Bellemou, Mouaci, Boutamine, Nourine, Benkhalidi, Laalili, Hadj Adlane.

23 June 1988 Final	USK Alger	0–0 (a.e.t.) (6–5 p)	CR Belcourt	Algiers
18:00	Benkhalidi (yellow card) 67'		Dahmani (yellow card) 67'	Stadium: Stade 5 Juillet 1962; Attendance: 36,204 (722,080 DA); Referee: Mohamed Hansal
	Penalties
	Mouaci (penalty missed); Benkhalidi (penalty scored); Hadj Adlane (penalty scored); Bengana (penalty scored); Laalili (penalty scored); Kourifa (penalty scored); Baaziz (penalty scored)		(penalty scored) Dahmani; (penalty scored) Méziane; (penalty scored) Kouhil; (penalty scored) Neggazi; (penalty missed) Amar Kabrane; (penalty scored) Yahi; (penalty missed) Zouati

== Squad information ==
=== Playing statistics ===
No.	Pos	Nat	Player	Total		National 1		Algerian Cup	
No.	Pos	Nat	Player	Apps	Goals	Apps	Goals	Apps	Goals
	GK	(Algeria) ALG	Moulooud Beltitane	0	0	0	0	0	0
	GK	(Algeria) ALG	Yacine Bentalaa	5	0	2	0	3	0
	DF	(Algeria) ALG	Redouane Bellemou	5	0	2	0	3	0
	DF	(Algeria) ALG	Farid Bengana	4	0	1	0	3	0
	DF	(Algeria) ALG	Samir Keddou	1	0	1	0	0	0
	DF	(Algeria) ALG	Rabah Kourifa	5	0	2	0	3	0
	DF	(Algeria) ALG	M'hamed Soumatia	4	0	1	0	3	0
	DF	(Algeria) ALG	Ramdane Hammaz	0	0	0	0	0	0
	DF	(Algeria) ALG	Khaled Fodil	0	0	0	0	0	0
	DF	(Algeria) ALG	Salim Slimani	0	0	0	0	0	0
	MF	(Algeria) ALG	Amirouche Laalili	5	0	2	0	3	0
	MF	(Algeria) ALG	Farid Mouaci	5	1	2	1	3	0
	MF	(Algeria) ALG	Athmane Nourine	4	1	1	0	3	1
	MF	(Algeria) ALG	Salim Boutamine	3	0	0	0	3	0
	MF	(Algeria) ALG	Réda Saâdedine	1	0	1	0	0	0
	MF	(Algeria) ALG	Rafik Bouchtout	0	0	0	0	0	0
	MF	(Algeria) ALG	Salah Bougerra	1	0	1	0	0	0
	MF	(Algeria) ALG	Mustapha Kouici	1	0	1	0	0	0
	FW	(Algeria) ALG	Boualem Baâziz	4	0	2	0	2	0
	FW	(Algeria) ALG	Tarek Hadj Adlane	5	1	2	0	3	1
	FW	(Algeria) ALG	Fawzi Benkhalidi	5	1	2	1	3	0
	FW	(Algeria) ALG	Samir Osmane	0	0	0	0	0	0
Players transferred out during the season

Source: Competitions

=== Goalscorers ===
Includes all competitive matches. The list is sorted alphabetically by surname when total goals are equal.

No.	Nat.	Player	Pos.	N 1	AC	TOTAL
7	(Algeria)	Tarek Hadj Adlane	FW	6	2	8
?	(Algeria)	Fawzi Benkhalidi	FW	8	0	8
?	(Algeria)	Farid Mouaci	MF	5	0	5
8	(Algeria)	Boualem Baâziz	FW	4	1	5
11	(Algeria)	Athmane Nourine	MF	3	1	4
?	(Algeria)	Amirouche Laalili	MF	1	0	1
?	(Algeria)	Farid Bengana	DF	1	0	1
?	(Algeria)	Réda Saadedine		1	0	1
Own Goals				0	1	1
Totals				29+6	5	34+6
