= 1988–89 USM Alger season =

USM Alger
1988–89 season
- President: Abdesslem Bensahli
- Head coach: Djamel Keddou & Mustapha Aksouh
- Stadium: Omar Hamadi Stadium
- Division 1: 13th
- Algerian Cup: Round of 16
- Cup Winners' Cup: Quarterfinals
- Top goalscorer: League: Tarek Hadj Adlane (7 goals); All: Tarek Hadj Adlane (9 goals)

In the 1988–89 season, USM Alger is competing in the Division 1 for the 18th time, as well as the Algerian Cup. It is their 2nd consecutive season in the top flight of Algerian football. They will be competing in Division 1 and the Algerian Cup.

== Review ==
- Committee of Honor :
  - Saadi Yacef, Ahmed Hadj Kemat, Mohamed Raouraoua, Bachir Ould Rouis, El Hadi Bahloul, Abdelkader Amrani, Zoubir Bouadjadj, El Hachemi Guerouabi
- Supporters Committee :
  - President, Ahmed Khelifi
  - Vice-presidents, Ayed Gouala, Smail Bettayeb
  - Secretary General, Mohamed Bellemou
  - Treasurer, Amar Hadj Latter
  - Socio-cultural Committee, Hamoud Ouassa
  - Legal Commission, Hamid Yacef
  - External Relations Commission, Mokhtar Madani

== Squad list ==
Players and squad numbers last updated on 1 September 1988.
Note: Flags indicate national team as has been defined under FIFA eligibility rules. Players may hold more than one non-FIFA nationality.

Nat.	Position	Name	Date of birth (age)	Signed from
(Algeria)	CB	Redouane Bellemou	26 July 1966 (aged 22)	Youth system
(Algeria)	GK	Moulooud Beltitane	20 January 1970 (aged 18)	Youth system
(Algeria)	LB	Abdelmalek Abdellaoui	28 December 1965 (aged 22)	(Algeria) Jeunesse de Belcourt
(Algeria)	LB	Farid Bengana	14 July 1963 (aged 25)	Youth system
(Algeria)	FW	Fawzi Benkhalidi	3 February 1963 (aged 25)	(Algeria) WA Boufarik
(Algeria)	GK	Yacine Bentalaa	24 September 1955 (aged 32)	(Algeria) RC Kouba
(Algeria)	CM	Salim Boutamine	3 April 1962 (aged 26)	Youth system
(Algeria)		Rafik Bouchtout	20 May 1968 (aged 20)	Youth system
(Algeria)	FW	Tarek Hadj Adlane	10 December 1965 (aged 22)	Youth system
(Algeria)		Khaled Fodil	29 October 1967 (aged 20)	Youth system
(Algeria)	MF	Ramdane Hammaz	2 January 1968 (aged 20)	Youth system
(Algeria)		Samir Keddou	21 June 1961 (aged 27)	(Algeria) MC Alger (Youth system)
(Algeria)	CB	Rabah Kourifa	10 March 1963 (aged 25)	Youth system
(Algeria)	MF	Amirouche Laalili	29 February 1964 (aged 24)	Youth system
(Algeria)	MF	Farid Mouaci	27 February 1964 (aged 24)	Youth system
(Algeria)		Samir Osmane	17 November 1964 (aged 23)	Youth system
(Algeria)		Salim Slimani	24 April 1964 (aged 24)	Youth system
(Algeria)		Réda Saadedine	1 January 1962 (aged 26)	
(Algeria)	RB	M'hamed Soumatia	21 October 1958 (aged 29)	Youth system
(Algeria)	MF	Ammar Kabrane	22 March 1964 (aged 24)	CR Belcourt
(Algeria)	MF	Djamel Amani	17 June 1962 (aged 26)	CR Belcourt
(Algeria)	FW	Boualem Baâziz	18 January 1960 (aged 28)	

== Competitions ==
=== Overview ===
Competition	Record								Started round	Final position / round	First match	Last match
Competition	G	W	D	L	GF	GA	GD	Win %	Started round	Final position / round	First match	Last match
Division 1	30	9	10	11	27	34	−7	30.00	—N/a	13rd	22 September 1988	1 June 1989
Algerian Cup	2	1	0	1	3	2	+1	50.00	Round of 32	Round of 16	12 January 1989	24 February 1989
Cup Winners' Cup	4	2	0	2	5	2	+3	50.00	First Round	Second Round	11 March 1989	19 May 1989
Total	36	12	10	14	35	38	−3	33.33				

=== Division 1 ===
==== League table ====
Pos	Team	Pld	W	D	L	GF	GA	GD	Pts	Qualification or relegation
11	RS Kouba	30	11	7	12	27	37	−10	29	
12	Espérance d'Aïn M'lila	30	9	11	10	24	23	+1	29	
13	Union d'Alger	30	9	10	11	27	34	−7	28	
14	MO Constantine	30	9	9	12	35	33	+2	27	
15	Union d'Aïn Béïda	30	11	5	14	35	41	−6	27	Relegated

Source: rsssf.com

==== Results by round ====
Round	1	2	3	4	5	6	7	8	9	10	11	12	13	14	15	16	17	18	19	20	21	22	23	24	25	26	27	28	29	30
Ground	H	A	A	H	A	H	A	H	A	H	A	H	A	H	A	A	H	H	A	H	A	H	A	H	A	H	A	H	A	H
Result	D	L	D	D	L	W	L	W	D	L	D	W	L	D	D	D	W	W	L	W	L	W	L	W	L	W	D	L	L	D
Position							16								12															13

Source: Competitive matches
A = Away; H = Home; W = Win; D = Draw; L = Loss

=== Matches ===
22 September 1988 Round 1	USM Alger	2–2	MC Oran	Bologhine
	Kabran 44'; Bengana 50'	Report	Ouanés 15'; Benyoucef 80'	Stadium: Omar Hamadi Stadium; Attendance: 9.271; Referee: Roumani
Note: Lineup for USK Alger - Bentalaa, Soumatia, Kourifa (Abdellaoui), Bengana, Amani, Mouaci, Kabrane, Lalili, Baâziz, Benkhalidi, Djebbar (Hochi).

29 September 1988 Round 2	JSM Tiaret	1–0	USM Alger	Tiaret
15:00	Maidi Adda 60'	Report		Stadium: Stade de la fraternité
Note: Lineup for USM Alger - , , , , , , , , , , .

20 October 1988 Round 3	USM Annaba	0–0	USM Alger	Annaba
		Report		Stadium: May 19, 1956 Stadium
Note: Lineup for USM Alger - , , , , , , , , , , .

24 October 1988 Round 4	USM Alger	2–2	RS Kouba	Bologhine
	Kabrane 17'; Mouassi 88'	Report	Assad 65' (pen.); Azel 72'	Stadium: Omar Hamadi Stadium
Note: Lineup for USM Alger - , , , , , , , , , , .

1 November 1988 Round 5	USM Aïn Beïda	2–0	USM Alger	Aïn Beïda
	Chawki Bentayeb 51', 55'	Report		Stadium: Stade 24 avril
Note: Lineup for USM Alger - , , , , , , , , , , .

10 November 1988 Round 6	USM Alger	1–0	JS Bordj Ménaïel	Bologhine
	Benkhalidi 49' (pen.)	Report		Stadium: Omar Hamadi Stadium
Note: Lineup for USM Alger - , , , , , , , , , , .

17 November 1988 Round 7	ESM Bel-Abbès	3–1	USM Alger	Sidi Bel Abbes
	Tlemçani 16' (pen.), 69'; Bouhdjar 61'	Report	Laalili 85'	Stadium: Stade 24 Fevrier 1956; Referee: Kouraji
Note: Lineup for USM Alger - , , , , , , , , , , .

23 January 1989 Round 8	USM Alger	2–0	MO Constantine	Bologhine
	Kabrane 59'; Lemani 68'	Report		Stadium: Omar Hamadi Stadium
Note: Lineup for USM Alger - , , , , , , , , , , .

1 December 1988 Round 9	ASM Oran	1–1	USM Alger	Oran
	(?)	Report	laalili 85'	Stadium: Habib Bouakeul Stadium
Note: Lineup for USM Alger - , , , , , , , , , , .

5 December 1988 Round 10	USM Alger	1–2	MC Alger	Algiers
	Benkhalidi 44'	Report	8', 79' Belaouchet	Stadium: Stade du 5 Juillet
Note: Lineup for USK Alger - Bentalaa, Soumatia, Kourifa, Bellemou Redouane (Abdellaoui), Amani, Osman (Hamez), Kabrane, Lalili, Baaziz, Benkhalidi, Hadj Adlane.

8 December 1988 Round 11	RC Relizane	1–1	USM Alger	Relizane
	Khellili 13'	Report	Benkhalidi 24'	Stadium: Stade d'El-Intissar; Referee: Dehamchi, Belatrèche, Benredadji
Note: Lineup for USM Alger - , , , , , , , , , , .

23 December 1988 Round 12	USM Alger	1–0	USM El Harrach	Bologhine
	Kabrane 14'	Report		Stadium: Omar Hamadi Stadium; Referee: Taleb, Dali, Missouri .
Note: Lineup for USM Alger - , , , , , , , , , , .

26 December 1988 Round 13	WKF Collo	2–0	USM Alger	Collo
14:30	(?) (?)	Report		Stadium: Stade Amar Bendjemâa
Note: Lineup for USM Alger - , , , , , , , , , , .

26 January 1989 Round 14	USM Alger	0–0	JE Tizi Ouzou	Bologhine
		Report		Stadium: Omar Hamadi Stadium
Note: Lineup for USM Alger - , , , , , , , , , , .

30 January 1989 Round 15	AS Ain M'lila	0–0	USM Alger	Aïn M'lila
		Report		Stadium: Stade des Frères Demane Debih
Note: Lineup for USM Alger - , , , , , , , , , , .

2 February 1989 Round 16	MC Oran	0–0	USM Alger	Oran
		Report		Stadium: Stade 19 juin 1965
Note: Lineup for USM Alger - , , , , , , , , , , .

16 February 1989 Round 17	USM Alger	2–0	JSM Tiaret	Bologhine
	Hadj Adlane 19'; Baaziz 33'			Stadium: Omar Hamadi Stadium
Note: Lineup for USM Alger - , , , , , , , , , , .

20 February 1989 Round 18	USM Alger	2–0	USM Annaba	Bologhine
	Kabrane 18'; Hadj Adlane 76'			Stadium: Omar Hamadi Stadium
Note: Lineup for USM Alger - , , , , , , , , , , .

27 February 1989 Round 19	RS Kouba	1–0	USM Alger	Algiers
	Dali Yahia 20'; Abdelsami 44'			Stadium: Stade du 5 Juillet
Note: Lineup for USM Alger - , , , , , , , , , , .

2 March 1989 Round 20	USM Alger	4–1	USM Aïn Beïda	Bologhine
	Hadj Adlane 35', 61'; Benkhalidi 40'; Hamaz 43'		Bentayeb (?)	Stadium: Omar Hamadi Stadium
Note: Lineup for USM Alger - , , , , , , , , , , .

6 April 1989 Round 21	JS Bordj Ménaïel	2–0	USM Alger	Bordj Menaïel
	(?) (?)			Stadium: Stade Salah Takjrad
Note: Lineup for USM Alger - , , , , , , , , , , .

17 March 1989 Round 22	USM Alger	1–0	ESM Bel-Abbès	Bologhine
	Kabrane 8'			Stadium: Omar Hamadi Stadium
Note: Lineup for USM Alger - , , , , , , , , , , .

24 April 1989 Round 23	MO Constantine	1–0	USM Alger	Constantine
	(?)			Stadium: Stade du 17 Juin
Note: Lineup for USM Alger - , , , , , , , , , , .

27 March 1989 Round 24	USM Alger	2–1	ASM Oran	Bologhine
	Hadj Adlane 20', 87'		(?)	Stadium: Omar Hamadi Stadium
Note: Lineup for USM Alger - , , , , , , , , , , .

30 March 1989 Round 25	MC Alger	2–0	USM Alger	Algiers
	Belaouchet 66'; Maïche 83'			Stadium: Stade du 5 Juillet; Referee: Hafirasou, Bouecha, Abid Charif
Note: Lineup for USK Alger - Bentalaa, Abdellaoui, Kourifa, Bengana, Osman, Mouaci, Hadj Adlane, Lalili, Kabrane, Benkhalidi, Hemaz (Djebbar).

13 April 1989 Round 26	USM Alger	2–0	RC Relizane	Bologhine
	laalili 6'; Hadj Adlane 47'			Stadium: Omar Hamadi Stadium
Note: Lineup for USM Alger - , , , , , , , , , , .

28 April 1989 Round 27	USM El Harrach	1–1	USM Alger	Algiers
	(?)		50' Hamaz	Stadium: Stade du 5 Juillet
Note: Lineup for USM Alger - , , , , , , , , , , .

25 May 1989 Round 28	USM Alger	0–2	WKF Collo	Bologhine
			(?) (?)	Stadium: Omar Hamadi Stadium
Note: Lineup for USM Alger - , , , , , , , , , , .

11 May 1989 Round 29	JE Tizi Ouzou	7–1	USM Alger	Tizi Ouzou
	Medane 21', 77'; Bouiche 34', 54', 65'; Rahmouni 52'; Adghigh 59'		Kourifa 23'	Stadium: November 1, 1954 Stadium
Note: Lineup for USM Alger - Beltitane, Soumatia, Bengana, Kourifa, Mouaci, Fodil, Baâziz, Benkhalidi, Hammaz, ?, Djebbar (Hadj Adlane, 65e).

1 June 1989 Round 30	USM Alger	0–0	AS Aïn M'lila	Bologhine
				Stadium: Omar Hamadi Stadium
Note: Lineup for USM Alger - , , , , , , , , , , .

=== Algerian Cup ===
12 January 1989 Round of 32	CM Belcourt	0–2	USK Alger	Algiers
14:30		Report	Baaziz 15'; Hadj Adlane 67'	Stadium: Stade du 5 Juillet
Note: Lineup for USM Alger - , Kourifa, , , , , , , Kabrane, Hadj Adlane, Baaziz.

24 February 1989 Round of 16	WKF Collo	2–1	USK Alger	Annaba
14:30	Kouadria 28'; Latreche 68'		Benkhalidi 84'	Stadium: 19 May 1956 Stadium
Note: Lineup for USM Alger - , , , , , , , , , , .

=== African Cup Winners' Cup ===
==== First round ====
11 March 1989 first leg	Liberté FC (Niger)	1–0	(Algeria) USM Alger	Niamey, Niger
	Nouma 88'			Stadium: Général Seyni Kountché Stadion; Referee: Salah Eddine (Nigeria)
Note: Lineup for USM Alger - Bentalaa, Kourifa, Abdellaoui, Laalili, Mouaci, Bellemou, Bengana, Hadj Adlane, Kabrane, Benkhalidi, Hammaz.

24 March 1989 Second leg	USM Alger (Algeria)	4–0	(Niger) Liberté FC	Bologhine, Algeria
	Mouaci 29' (pen.); Kabrane 58'; Benkhalidi 78'; Hadj Adlane 81'			Stadium: Omar Hamadi Stadium; Referee: Nadjidi (Morocco)
Note: Lineup for USM Alger - bentalaa, Abdelaoui, (Soumaatia), Bengana, Bellemou, Kourifa, Laalili, Mouaci, Benkhalidi, Hadj Adlane, Kabrane, Hammaz.

==== Second round ====
7 May 1989 first leg	Stade Malien (Mali)	1–0	(Algeria) USM Alger	Bamako, Mali
16:30 UTC+1	Mahamadou Cisse 47'	Report		Stadium: Stade Modibo Kéïta; Attendance: 18,000; Referee: Mohamed Souadi (Libya)
Note: Lineup for USM Alger - Bentalaa, Bellemou, Bengana, Abdellaoui, Kourifa, Mouaci, kabrane (Djebbar 90+3’), Baâziz, Laalili, Hadj Adlane, Benkhalidi.

19 May 1989 Second leg	USM Alger (Algeria)	1–0 (4–3 p)	(Mali) Stade Malien	Bologhine, Algeria
17:00 UTC+1	Kabrane 40'	Report		Stadium: Omar Hamadi Stadium; Attendance: 7,000; Referee: Yahia El-Barbary (Egypt)
	Penalties
	? (penalty scored) ? (penalty scored) ? (penalty missed) ? (penalty scored) ? (penalty scored)		(penalty missed) ? (penalty scored) ? (penalty scored) ? (penalty scored) ? (penalty missed) ?
Note: Lineup for USM Alger - Bentalaa, Abdellaoui, Kourifa, Bengana, Bellemou, Mouaci, Hadj Adlane, Laallili, Kabrane, Benkhalidi, Baaziz (Hamaz).

== Squad information ==
=== Playing statistics ===
No.	Pos	Nat	Player	Total		National 1		Algerian Cup		Cup Winners' Cup	
No.	Pos	Nat	Player	Apps	Goals	Apps	Goals	Apps	Goals	Apps	Goals
	GK	(Algeria) ALG	Moulooud Beltitane	0	0	0	0	0	0	0	0
	GK	(Algeria) ALG	Yacine Bentalaa	7	0	3	0	0	0	4	0
	DF	(Algeria) ALG	Abdelmalek Abdellaoui	7	0	1+2	0	0	0	4	0
	DF	(Algeria) ALG	Redouane Bellemou	5	0	1	0	0	0	4	0
	DF	(Algeria) ALG	Farid Bengana	6	1	2	1	0	0	4	0
	DF	(Algeria) ALG	M'hamed Soumatia	3	0	2	0	0	0	0+1	0
	DF	(Algeria) ALG	Djamel Amani	2	0	2	0	0	0	0	0
	DF	(Algeria) ALG	Rabah Kourifa	7	0	3	0	0	0	4	0
	MF	(Algeria) ALG	Amirouche Laalili	7	0	3	0	0	0	4	0
	MF	(Algeria) ALG	Farid Mouaci	6	0	2	0	0	0	4	0
	MF	(Algeria) ALG	Salim Boutamine	0	0	0	0	0	0	0	0
	MF	(Algeria) ALG	Ramdane Hammaz	5	0	1+1	0	0	0	2+1	0
	MF	(Algeria) ALG	Samir Osmane	2	0	2	0	0	0	0	0
	MF	(Algeria) ALG	Hochi	1	0	0+1	0	0	0	0	0
	FW	(Algeria) ALG	Boualem Baâziz	4	0	2	0	0	0	2	0
	FW	(Algeria) ALG	Tarek Hadj Adlane	6	0	2	0	0	0	4	0
	FW	(Algeria) ALG	Fawzi Benkhalidi	7	1	3	1	0	0	4	0
	FW	(Algeria) ALG	Ammar kabrane	7	2	3	1	0	0	4	1
	FW	(Algeria) ALG	Fodil Djebbar	3	0	1+1	0	0	0	0+1	0
Players transferred out during the season

Source: Competitions

=== Goalscorers ===
Includes all competitive matches. The list is sorted alphabetically by surname when total goals are equal.

No.	Nat.	Player	Pos.	N 1	AC	CWC	TOTAL
7	(Algeria)	Tarek Hadj Adlane	FW	7	1	1	9
9	(Algeria)	Ammar kabrane	FW	6	0	2	8
10	(Algeria)	Fawzi Benkhalidi	FW	4	1	1	6
8	(Algeria)	Amirouche Laalili	MF	3	0	0	3
?	(Algeria)	Boualem Baâziz	FW	1	1	0	2
11	(Algeria)	Ramdane Hammaz	MF	2	0	0	2
6	(Algeria)	Farid Mouaci	MF	1	0	1	2
4	(Algeria)	Farid Bengana	MF	1	0	0	1
3	(Algeria)	Rabah Kourifa	DF	1	0	0	1
?	(Algeria)	Lemani	?	1	0	0	1
Own Goals				0	0	0	0
Totals				25	3	5	33
