= 1989–90 USM Alger season =

USM Alger
1988–89 season
- Chairman: Saïd Hammo
- Head coach: Djamel Keddou & Mustapha Aksouh (until ?); Tewfik Korichi (from ?) (until ?); Ali Benfadah (from ?)
- Stadium: Omar Hamadi Stadium
- Division 1: 16th
- Cup Winners' Cup: Quarterfinals
- Top goalscorer: League: Tarek Hadj Adlane (9 goals); All: Tarek Hadj Adlane (9 goals)

In the 1989–90 season, USM Alger is competing in the National for the 19th time, It is their 3rd consecutive season in the top flight of Algerian football. No Algerian Cup this season.

== Squad list ==
Players and squad numbers last updated on 1 September 1989.
Note: Flags indicate national team as has been defined under FIFA eligibility rules. Players may hold more than one non-FIFA nationality.

Nat.	Position	Name	Date of Birth (Age)	Signed from
(Algeria)	CB	Redouane Bellemou	26 July 1966 (aged 23)	Youth system
(Algeria)	GK	Moulooud Beltitane	20 January 1970 (aged 19)	Youth system
(Algeria)	LB	Farid Bengana	14 July 1963 (aged 26)	Youth system
(Algeria)		Nacereddine El Aouada	?	(Algeria) MC Alger
(Algeria)	LB	Abdelmalek Abdellaoui	28 December 1965 (aged 23)	(Algeria) CR Belcourt
(Algeria)	FW	Fawzi Benkhalidi	3 February 1963 (aged 26)	(Algeria) WA Boufarik
(Algeria)	CM	Salim Boutamine	3 April 1962 (aged 27)	Youth system
(Algeria)	FW	Tarek Hadj Adlane	10 December 1965 (aged 23)	Youth system
(Algeria)		Ramdane Hammaz	2 January 1968 (aged 21)	Youth system
(Algeria)	CB	Rabah Kourifa	10 March 1963 (aged 26)	Youth system
(Algeria)	CM	Amirouche Laalili	29 February 1964 (aged 25)	Youth system
(Algeria)	CM	Farid Mouaci	27 February 1964 (aged 25)	Youth system
(Algeria)		Samir Osmane	17 November 1964 (aged 24)	Youth system
(Algeria)	RB	M'hamed Soumatia	21 October 1958 (aged 30)	Youth system
(Algeria)	MF	Toufik Fouial		
(Algeria)	MF	Ammar Kabrane	22 March 1964 (aged 25)	CR Belcourt
(Algeria)	FW	Boualem Baâziz	18 January 1960 (aged 29)	

== Competitions ==
=== Overview ===
Competition	Record								Started round	Final position / round	First match	Last match
Competition	G	W	D	L	GF	GA	GD	Win %	Started round	Final position / round	First match	Last match
Division 1	30	8	7	15	23	39	−16	26.67	—N/a	16th	31 August 1989	14 June 1990
Cup Winners' Cup	1	0	0	1	1	3	−2	0.00	Quarter-finals		8 September 1989	23 September 1989
Total	31	8	7	16	24	42	−18	25.81				

=== Division 1 ===
==== League table ====
Pos	Team	Pld	W	D	L	GF	GA	GD	Pts	Qualification or relegation
12	USM El Harrach	30	10	8	12	28	35	−7	28	
13	AS Aïn M'lila	30	8	12	10	20	28	−8	28	
14	MO Constantine	30	11	5	14	22	35	−13	27	
15	RC Relizane	30	7	12	11	33	31	+2	26	Relegated
16	USM Alger	30	8	7	15	23	39	−16	23	Relegated

==== Results by round ====
Round	1	2	3	4	5	6	7	8	9	10	11	12	13	14	15	16	17	18	19	20	21	22	23	24	25	26	27	28	29	30
Ground	H	A	H	A	H	A	H	A	H	A	H	A	H	A	A	A	H	A	H	A	H	A	H	A	H	A	H	A	H	H
Result	L	L	W	L	L	L	D	L	D	L	W	L	L	L	L	D	W	L	D	L	W	D	W	L	W	L	D	D	W	W
Position																														16

Source: Competitive matches
A = Away; H = Home; W = Win; D = Draw; L = Loss

=== Matches ===
31 August 1989 Round 1	USM Alger	0–1	MO Constantine	Bologhine
		Report	22' Mellala	Stadium: Omar Hamadi Stadium

11 September 1989 Round 2	USM El Harrach	3–0	USM Alger	El Harrach
15:00	Baya 43'; Benomar 45'; Boukallel 85' Nouri El Ayachi (c), Noureddine Sadji, Mohamed Kerraz, Nacer Bechouche, Ahmed Herabi, Younes Ifticène (Hamache), Djadi, Boukellal, Baya, Hacene Benomar (Hamaidi), Kouici.	Report	Zemmouri, Soumatia, Abdelaoui, Bellemou, Kourifa, Mouaci (c), Hadj Adlane, Fodil, Kabrane, Benkhalidi (Benamer), Rahim.	Stadium: Stade du 1er Novembre 1954; Referee: Roumani, Bettache, Halalchi

14 September 1989 Round 3	USM Alger	1–0	RC Relizane	Bologhine
	Mouassi 44' (pen.)	Report		Stadium: Omar Hamadi Stadium

29 September 1989 Round 4	USM Annaba	2–1	USM Alger	Annaba
	(?) (?)	Report	(?) Benkhalidi	Stadium: May 19, 1956 Stadium

12 October 1989 Round 5	USM Alger	0–1	ES Sétif	Bologhine
		Report	Rahmouni 26'	Stadium: Omar Hamadi Stadium

19 October 1989 Round 6	RC Kouba	2–0	USM Alger	Kouba
	Yahia Dali 20'; Rachid Abdessamia 44'	Report		Stadium: Omar Benhaddad Stadium

20 November 1989 Round 7	USM Alger	0–0	MC Alger	Bologhine
19:00		Report		Stadium: Omar Hamadi Stadium

24 November 1989 Round 8	ASM Oran	2–0	USM Alger	Oran
	(?) (?)	Report		Stadium: Ahmed Zabana Stadium

30 November 1989 Round 9	USM Alger	0–0	USM Bel-Abbès	Bologhine
		Report		Stadium: Omar Hamadi Stadium

8 December 1989 Round 10	JSM Tiaret	3–0	USM Alger	Tiaret
	(?) (?) (?)	Report		Stadium: Ahmed Kaïd Stadium

14 December 1989 Round 11	USM Alger	1–0	AS Aïn M'lila	Bologhine
	Boutamine (?)	Report		Stadium: Omar Hamadi Stadium

22 December 1989 Round 12	CR Belcourt	2–0	USM Alger	Hamma Annassers
	Badache 2'; Neggazi 22' Medjreb, Kouici, Khoudja, Bougerra, Badache, Rouati, Zaghzi (substituted off) 60' (Bakhti, (substituted on) 60'), Zidane (substituted off) 83' (Hemaili, (substituted on) 83'), Harb, Neggazi	Report	Zemmouri, Soumatia, Bellemou, Gherabi, Mouaci, Hadj Adlane, Laalili, Kabrane (substituted off) 40' (Moussouni, (substituted on) 40'), Boutamine (substituted off) 60' (Benkhalidi, (substituted on) 60'), Rahim, Kourifa	Stadium: Stade du 20 Août 1955; Referee: Kaddouri, Battache, Hammouche

18 December 1989 Round 13	USM Alger	1–3	JS Kabylie	Bologhine
	Benkhalidi (?)	Report	Djahnit 32'; Bouiche 62'; Medane 70'	Stadium: Omar Hamadi Stadium; Referee: Djazzar

5 January 1990 Round 14	JS Bordj Ménaïel	1–0	USM Alger	Bordj Menaïel
	? (?)	Report		Stadium: Stade Salah Takjrad

22 January 1990 Round 15	MC Oran	6–2	USM Alger	Oran
	Sebbah 14' (pen.); Belloumi 27', 62'; Mecheri 48', 68'; Bouresla 42' Berkane, Foussi, Bott, Ouanés, Benhalima (Arif, 46'), Mecheri, Sebbah, Benzerouata, Benyoucef, Belloumi (c), Borasla (Larbi, 75').	Report	Hadj Adlane 22'; Mouassi 88' Bltitane, Soumatia, Kourifa, Gherabi, Laalili, Mouaci, Hadj Adlane, Lakhnéche, Hemmaz (Slahi, 64'), Benkhalidi (Fouial, 51'), Benameur.	Stadium: Habib Bouakeul Stadium; Attendance: 8.000; Referee: Hansal, Saada, Dali

26 March 1990 Round 16	MO Constantine	0–0	USM Alger	Constantine
	Laouar, Gamouh, Sedjadi, Houasnia, Zeghdoud, Mechehoud, Maamar, Belamri, Theniou, Mokhnache, Zeghbib, El-Groud Rachid.	Rapport	Toufik Zemmouri, Soumatia, Abdelaoui, Gherabi, Bengana, Mouaci, Laalili, Kourifa, Kabrane, Boutamine, Benameur.	Stadium: Stade du 17 Juin; Referee: Kouras, Handis, Lamara

8 February 1990 Round 17	USM Alger	1–0	USM El Harrach	Bologhine
	Hadj Adlane 33'	Report		Stadium: Omar Hamadi Stadium

16 February 1990 Round 18	RC Relizane	2–0	USM Alger	Relizane
	(?) (?)	Report		Stadium: Stade Tahar Zoughari

19 March 1990 Round 19	USM Alger	0–0	USM Annaba	Bologhine
14:00	Toufik Zemmouri, Soumatia, Abdellaoui, Gherabi, Kourifa, Mouaci, Hadj Adlane, Laalili, Kabrane, Boutamine (Bengana, 46') Hammaz, (Boudib).	Rapport	Abdelaziz, Manaa (Laamri), Belassli, Zitouni, Slatni, Mecherfi, Mebarki, Grine, Messas, Gatay, Zernih.	Stadium: Omar Hamadi Stadium; Referee: Laaouedj, Lefdjah, Houni

29 March 1990 Round 20	ES Sétif	3–0	USM Alger	Sétif
14:00	Bernaoui (red card) 31'; Zorgane 43'; Benjaballah 46', 74' Osmani, Nebti, Senouci, Bernaoui, Boulahdjilet, Rahmani, Abderrahim Benjaballah, Zorgane, Gherib, Matem, Rahmouni - Coach: Noureddine El-Hadj & Bouzid Cheniti	Report	Laallili (red card) 30' Zemouri, Soumatia, Abdellaoui, Osmane, Gherabi, Lalili, Bengana, Laouada (Mouaci, 65'), Boudib, Ait Tahar (Boutamine, 16'), Benameur - Coach: Ali Benfadah & Zaitsev	Stadium: Stade 8 Mai 1945; Referee: Rabki, Chihi, Grabsi

5 April 1990 Round 21	USM Alger	1–0	RC Kouba	Bologhine
14:00	Hadj Adlane 65' Zemmouri, Soumatia, Abdelaoui, Guerabi, Bengana, Mouaci, Hadj Adlane, Benkhalidi, Kabrane, Boutamine, Benamer, Lakhneche - Coach: Ali Benfadah	Report	Hamouche, Abdelguerfi, Azeb.M, Zeraia, Mohamed Chaïb (c), Mebarki, Ibrir, Azeb.A, Yahia Dali, Rachid Abdessamia, Rachid Hamada - Coach: Nour Benzekri	Stadium: Omar Hamadi Stadium; Referee: Bettache, Berouane, Bachtobdji

13 April 1990 Round 22	MC Alger	1–1	USM Alger	Algiers
14:00	Abdellaoui 37' (o.g.) Kadri, Teggar, Boukhari, Lazizi, Meziane, Toumi, Hedibel, Meraga, Belhouchet, Guettouche, Maza		Benkhalidi 18' Toufik Zemmouri, Soumatia, Abdellaoui, Kourifa, Bengana, Mouaci, Hammaz, Benkhalidi, Hadj Adlane, Boutemine, Benameur - Coach: Ali Benfadah	Stadium: Stade du 5 Juillet; Referee: Rachid Medjiba

19 April 1990 Round 23	USM Alger	1–0	ASM Oran	Bologhine
	Kabrane 14'			Stadium: Omar Hamadi Stadium

26 April 1990 Round 24	USM Bel-Abbès	2–0	USM Alger	Sidi Bel Abbes
	Louahla 54'; Benmimoun 90'			Stadium: Stade 24 Fevrier 1956

3 May 1990 Round 25	USM Alger	5–1	JSM Tiaret	Bologhine
14:00	Kabrane 49'; Hadj Adlane 52', 68', 90'; Benkhalidi 83' Zemmouri, Soumatia, Abdellaoui, Bellemou (Kourifa, 46'), Bengana, Mouaci (Lakhneche, 44'), Hadj Adlane (c), Benkhalidi, Kabrane, Laalili, Benamer - Coach: Ali Benfadah	Report	Gueffaf 33' Enthlidjène, Khalil (c), Meftah, Ayada, Benyamina, Fergougui, Djerada, Benaissa, Mourad Ardjaoui, Boussaadia, Ahmed Gueffaf - Coach: Krimo Laribi	Stadium: Omar Hamadi Stadium; Referee: Bergui, Haffaf, Berrouane

10 May 1990 Round 26	AS Aïn M'lila	1–0	USM Alger	Aïn M'lila
	Aloui 61'	Report		Stadium: Stade des Frères Demane-Debbih

17 May 1990 Round 27	USM Alger	0–0	CR Belcourt	Bologhine
		Report		Stadium: Omar Hamadi Stadium

21 May 1990 Round 28	JS Kabylie	2–2	USM Alger	Béjaïa
	Djahnit 21'; Ait Tahar 90'	Report	Hammaz 77'; Rahim 88'	Stadium: Stade de l'Unité maghrébine

31 May 1990 Round 29	USM Alger	4–1	JS Bordj Ménaïel	Bologhine
	Benkhalidi 38'; Laalili 46'; Hammaz 57'; Hadj Adlane 62'	Report	Talaoubrid 72'	Stadium: Omar Hamadi Stadium; Referee: hraichi

14 June 1990 Round 30	USM Alger	2–1	MC Oran	Bologhine
	Hadj Adlane 25', 57'	Report	Tayeb Foussi 70'	Stadium: Omar Hamadi Stadium

=== African Cup Winners' Cup ===
==== Quarter-finals ====
8 September 1989 first leg	USM Alger (Algeria)	1–3	(Madagascar) FC BFV	Algiers, Algeria
17:00	Benkhalidi 57' Beltitane, Abdellaoui, Kourifa, Bellemou, Osman, Mouaci (c), Hadj Adlane, Laalili, Kabrane, Benkhalidi, Rahim (Hammaz)	Report	Radonaivo 14', 65'; Amdrianboulola 85' Hanaga, Rakotumanga, Clement, Ratovotanahary, Rasdanaivo H, Rasdanaivo F, Rakoton, Drabe, Ralata Fika, Tononainly, Tfan (Razatimahiry), Adrian, Bulolona, (Rabe)	Stadium: Stade du 5 Juillet; Attendance: 2,000; Referee: Baba Laouissi (Morocco)

23 September 1989 Second leg	FC BFV (Madagascar)	Withdrew	(Algeria) USM Alger	Antananarivo, Madagascar
Note: USM Alger decided not to complete the competition for financial reasons.

== Squad information ==
=== Playing statistics ===
No.	Pos	Nat	Player	Total		Division 1		Cup Winners' Cup	
No.	Pos	Nat	Player	Apps	Goals	Apps	Goals	Apps	Goals
	GK	(Algeria) ALG	Moulooud Beltitane	2	0	1	0	1	0
	GK	(Algeria) ALG	Toufik Zemmouri	8	0	8	0	0	0
	DF	(Algeria) ALG	Abdelmalek Abdellaoui	8	0	7	0	1	0
	DF	(Algeria) ALG	Rabah Kourifa	8	0	6+1	0	1	0
	DF	(Algeria) ALG	Redouane Bellemou	4	0	3	0	1	0
	DF	(Algeria) ALG	Samir Osmane	2	0	1	0	1	0
	DF	(Algeria) ALG	M'hamed Soumatia	9	0	9	0	0	0
	DF	(Algeria) ALG	Farid Bengana	6	0	5+1	0	0	0
	DF	(Algeria) ALG	Djamel Gherabi	6	0	6	0	0	0
	MF	(Algeria) ALG	Ramdane Hammaz	4	1	3	1	0+1	0
	MF	(Algeria) ALG	Farid Mouaci	10	1	8+1	1	1	0
	MF	(Algeria) ALG	Salim Boutamine	6	0	5+1	0	0	0
	MF	(Algeria) ALG	Amirouche Laalili	7	0	6	0	1	0
	MF	(Algeria) ALG	Benameur	7	0	6+1	0	0	0
	MF	(Algeria) ALG	Toufik Fouial	1	0	0+1	0	0	0
	MF	(Algeria) ALG	Nacereddine El Aouada	1	0	1	0	0	0
	MF	(Algeria) ALG	Ait Tahar	1	0	1	0	0	0
	MF	(Algeria) ALG	Boudib	2	0	1+1	0	0	0
	MF	(Algeria) ALG	Reda Lakhnéche	3	0	2+1	0	0	0
	MF	(Algeria) ALG	Slahi	1	0	0+1	0	0	0
	FW	(Algeria) ALG	Fodil Djebbar	1	0	1	0	0	0
	FW	(Algeria) ALG	Tarek Hadj Adlane	8	5	7	5	1	0
	FW	(Algeria) ALG	Fawzi Benkhalidi	6	2	4+1	1	1	1
	FW	(Algeria) ALG	Fawzi Moussouni	1	0	0+1	0	0	0
	FW	(Algeria) ALG	Ammar kabrane	7	1	6	1	1	0
	FW	(Algeria) ALG	Azzedine Rahim	3	0	2	0	1	0
Players transferred out during the season

Source: Competitions

=== Goalscorers ===
Includes all competitive matches. The list is sorted alphabetically by surname when total goals are equal.

No.	Nat.	Player	Pos.	N 1	CWC	TOTAL
7	(Algeria)	Tarek Hadj Adlane	FW	9	0	9
10	(Algeria)	Fawzi Benkhalidi	FW	5	1	6
11	(Algeria)	Ramdane Hammaz	MF	2	0	2
9	(Algeria)	Ammar kabrane	FW	2	0	2
6	(Algeria)	Farid Mouaci	MF	2	0	2
?	(Algeria)	Azzedine Rahim	FW	1	0	1
?	(Algeria)	Salim Boutamine	MF	1	0	1
8	(Algeria)	Amirouche Laalili	MF	1	0	1
Own Goals				0	0	0
Totals				23	1	24
