= 1944–45 USM Alger season =

USM Alger
1944–45 season
- First Division: 1st
- Forconi Cup: Second Round

In the 1944–45 season, USM Alger competed in the Second Division for the 8th season French colonial era, as well as the Forconi Cup. They competed in First Division, and the Forconi Cup. During the previous period, the Second World War, an extremely difficult era marked by chaos, transition, and numerous challenges the doors of USMA remained open to young people of all backgrounds, who were met with warmth and consideration. The club played a role in education, training, and cultural and sporting guidance.

== Review ==
After numerous discussions within the League, and thanks to the goodwill shown by a significant number of clubs wishing to take part in the competition this season a number higher than the previous season it was decided to retain last year’s competition format, with a few adjustments: the Critérium d'Alger will be organized for both senior and youth categories, and the Critérium des équipes inférieures will also involve seniors and youth teams, and will be divided into two groups. The qualified teams from each group will face off in playoffs to determine the Algiers Lower Division Champion. USM Alger began the season with a mixed squad, combining some veteran players with new young recruits. Among the most notable additions was Rabah Zouaoui, a centre forward and former player of SC Algérois and MC Alger.

Like many Algerian clubs, USM Alger was heavily affected during World War II. Official football activities were halted, and only informal matches were held under strict French colonial supervision. After the war ended, Algerian Muslim players and club officials, including those at USM Alger, faced significant repression. Many were banned from returning to sporting activities, particularly those suspected of political involvement or support for the nationalist movement. USM Alger was directly impacted by the massacres of May 8, 1945, which left a deep scar on the club. Some of its members were killed or injured during the brutal French crackdown. In remembrance of these tragic events, the club adopted its iconic red and black colors as a lasting symbol of sacrifice and mourning, according to club leaders and contemporaries.

== Squad list ==
USM Alger squad list.
1 Rabah Bedaréne	2 Rabah Zouaoui	3 Mohamed Berkani	4 Abdelkader Chaouane	5 Abdelkader Boufaras
6 Mohamed Hachelaf	7 Ismaïl Mahmoudi	8 Mohamed Hamdi	9 Allel Ouaguenouni	10 Mustapha Ouaguenouni
11 Bachir Hammoudi	12 Mustapha El Kamal	13 Youssef El Kamel	14 Abdelkader Tchico	15 Mohamed El Ouardi
16 Ammar Qaseb	17 Mery Salvadour	18 Bazile Nivali	19	20

== Competitions ==
=== Overview ===
Competition	Record								Started round	Final position / round	First match	Last match
Competition	G	W	D	L	GF	GA	GD	Win %	Started round	Final position / round	First match	Last match
First Division	14	11	2	1	45	12	+33	78.57	—N/a	1st	8 October 1944	6 May 1945
Playoffs	1	0	0	1	0	2	−2	0.00	—N/a	—N/a	13 May 1945	13 May 1945
Forconi Cup	2	1	0	1	4	3	+1	50.00	First Round	Second Round	1 October 1944	5 November 1944
Total	17	12	2	3	49	17	+32	70.59				

== League table ==
=== Group B ===
Pos	Team	Pld	W	D	L	GF	GA	GD	Pts	Qualification
1	USM Alger	14	11	2	1	45	12	+33	38	Qualified for Playoffs First Division
2	USM Maison Carré	0	0	0	0	0	0	0	0	
3	CA Paté	0	0	0	0	0	0	0	0	
4	AST Alger	0	0	0	0	0	0	0	0	
5	AS Montpensier	0	0	0	0	0	0	0	0	
6	ASPTT Alger	0	0	0	0	0	0	0	0	
7	RAS Algérois	0	0	0	0	0	0	0	0	
8	RC Maison Carré	0	0	0	0	0	0	0	0	Relegated to 1945–46 Second Division

==== Results by round ====
Round	1	2	3	4	5	6	7	8	9	10	11	12	13	14
Ground	H	H	A	H	A	H	H	A	A	H	A	H	A	A
Result	W	W	W	W	W	D	D	W	W	W	W	W	D	L
Position												1	1	1

Updated to match(es) played on 6 May 1945. Source: Competitive matches
A = Away; H = Home; W = Win; D = Draw; L = Loss

=== Matches ===
Win Draw Loss

8 October 1944 Round 1	USM Alger	6–2	ASPTT Alger	Hydra
16:30		Report		Referee: Attanasio, Buono

15 October 1944 Round 2	USM Alger	1–0	USM Maison Carré	Algiers
	Rabah Zouaoui	Report		Stadium: Stade d'Alger; Referee: Gristi, Buono

22 October 1944 Round 3	RAS Algérois	0–2	USM Alger	Hydra
		Report	Mohamed Hamdi; Rabah Bedarane

12 November 1944 Round 4	USM Alger	4–1	AS Montpensier	Hydra
		Report

10 December 1944 Round 5	CA Paté	1–6	USM Alger	Hussein Dey
		Report		Stadium: Stade de Hussein Dey

17 December 1944 Round 6	USM Alger	1–1	AST Alger
	Rabah Zouaoui	Report

14 January 1945 Round 7	USM Alger	2–2	RC Maison Carré	Saint Eugène
	Rabah Zouaoui; Mustapha El Kamal	Report		Stadium: Stade Communal de Saint Eugène

28 January 1945 Round 8	USM Alger	6–1	ASPTT Alger	Hydra
		Report

18 February 1945 Round 9	USM Maison Carré	0–4	USM Alger	Maison-Carrée
		Report		Stadium: Stade Lavigerie

11 March 1945 Round 10	USM Alger	3–2	RAS Algérois	Hydra
16:00	Rabah Zouaoui; Mohamed Hamdi; Mustapha El Kamal (?)	Report

18 March 1945 Round 11	AS Montpensier	0–5	USM Alger	Minerval
16:00		Report		Stadium: Stade de Minerval

15 April 1945 Round 12	USM Alger	4–0	CA Paté
	Rabah Zouaoui; Mustapha El Kamal	Report

22 April 1945 Round 13	AST Alger	1–1	USM Alger	Saint Eugène
16:00		Report		Stadium: Stade Communal de Saint Eugène

6 May 1945 Round 14	RC Maison Carré	1–0	USM Alger	Maison-Carrée
		Report		Stadium: Stade Lavigerie

=== Playoff ===
13 May 1945	USM Alger	0–2	USM Blida	Algiers
15:00		Report	Bendjiar; Hatem	Stadium: Stade Municipal; Referee: Derradji
Note: Lineup for USM Alger - Bazile, Isgouti, Hamoudi, Chaouane, Tchikou, Hachelaf, Smain, Zouaoui, Kader, El Kamal I, El Kamal II.

== Forconi Cup ==
1 October 1944 First Round	USM Alger	4–0	RAS Algérois	Saint Eugène
13:30	Zouaoui; Youssef El Kamal	Report		Stadium: Stade Communal de Saint Eugène; Referee: Ammar
Note: Lineup for USM Alger - Meknech, Khiat, Salvador, Chouane, Tchiken, Isgouty, Boufares, El Kamal A, Zouaoui, El Kamel Youssef, Mahmoudi.

5 November 1944 Second Round	RS Alger	3–0	USM Alger	Belcourt
12:00	Ponsetti; Allès	Report		Stadium: Stade municipal Referee: Ammar
Note: Lineup for USM Alger - Meknech, Salvador, Isgouti, Khiat, Tchikou, Chaouane, Bedaren, El Kamal, Boufaras, Zouaoui, Smain.
