= 1947–48 USM Alger season =

USM Alger
1947–48 season
- Chairman: Mohamed Zenagui
- Head coach: Mustapha El Kamal
- First Division: 1st
- Forconi Cup: Quarter-final
- Top goalscorer: League: Rabah Zouaoui (13 goals); All: Rabah Zouaoui (15 goals)

In the 1947–48 season, USM Alger is competing in the First Division for the 11th season French colonial era, as well as the Forconi Cup. They will be competing in First Division, and the Forconi Cup.

== Review ==
Recently, in the presence of many personalities, the friendly Muslim multi sports club, USM Alger, inaugurated its physical culture hall. Located at 5, rue de Bône, this spacious venue includes several rooms with changing rooms and showers where basketball players, boxers, gymnasts, and athletes can train in the best possible conditions. During the event, speeches were made and donations were offered to encourage the leaders of USMA to strive for even greater achievements in the future.

— The daily newspaper L’Égalité wrote about the new headquarters and multi-sport hall.

On August 22, 1947, USM Alger officially inaugurated its new headquarters and multi-sports hall located at 5, rue de Bône (Algiers). The ceremony was attended by many personalities, as well as club officials and honorary members. The large complex included several physical training rooms equipped with changing rooms and showers, a basketball court, a boxing ring, a gymnastics hall, and areas for medical care. The upper floor housed offices and meeting rooms. L'Écho d'Alger reported the words of club leader Mohamed Zenagui, who declared: “The Union’s projects will not stop here, we will continue along the path we have set, inch’Allah.”

According to club official Abdelkader Omrani, the building had once been a stable for animals, located in a narrow alley leading toward the Soustara neighborhood. The club obtained the property and undertook its transformation. The work was carried out by volunteers, including officials, members, supporters, and sympathizers. The son of former player Hassan Rabah recalled that his father, a bricklayer by trade, took an active part in the construction and renovation, supervising several phases of the project.

USM Alger then entered the Coupe départementale, an official competition that brought together clubs from Algiers and its surroundings. Exempt from the first round, USMA made its debut in the second round. On September 7, 1947, at the Hydra Stadium, the “Red and Black” faced SCU El Biar and won 2–1. Two weeks later, on September 28, they traveled to Palestro to take on Bouira AC. In a one-sided match, USMA claimed a convincing 4–0 victory, cheered on by a large crowd that had traveled to support the team.

== Squad list ==
USM Alger squad list.
1 Rabah Bedaréne	2 Rabah Zouaoui	3 Ammar Chaouane	4 Abdelkader Chaouane
5 Sid Ali Madoui	6 Abdelkader Djaknoun	7 Hassen Zitouni	8 Mohamed Hamdi
9 Allel Ouaguenouni	10 Mustapha Ouaguenouni	11 Kamal Benhaddad	12 Mustapha El Kamal
13 Youssef El Kamel	14 Ismaïl Mahmoudi	15 Abdelkader Tchico	16 Mohamed Toubal
17 Zoubir Bouadjadj	18 Ahmed Azzouz	19 Mohamed Ben Choubane	20 Mohamed Bastani
21 Ammar Aidoune	22 Zoubir Benganif		

== Competitions ==
=== Overview ===
Competition	Record								Started round	Final position / round	First match	Last match
Competition	G	W	D	L	GF	GA	GD	Win %	Started round	Final position / round	First match	Last match
First Division	18	13	2	3	39	9	+30	72.22	—N/a	1st	14 September 1947	3 April 1948
Forconi Cup	5	4	0	1	10	4	+6	80.00	Second Round	Quarter-final	7 September 1947	4 January 1948
Total	23	17	2	4	49	13	+36	73.91				

== League table ==
=== Group B ===
Pos	Team	Pld	W	D	L	F	A	GD	Pts	Notes
1	USM Alger	18	14	2	2	40	9	+31	44	
2	US Fort de l'Eau	18	0	0	0	0	0	0	0	
3	SCU El Biar	18	0	0	0	0	0	0	0	
4	US Blida	18	0	0	0	0	0	0	0	
5	O Rouiba	18	0	0	0	0	0	0	0	
6	O Tizi Ouzou	18	0	0	0	0	0	0	0	
7	AS Trèfle Alger	18	0	0	0	0	0	0	0	
8	SA Belcourt	18	0	0	0	0	0	0	0	
9	US Ain-Taya	18	0	0	0	0	0	0	0	
10	AS Rivet	18	0	0	0	0	0	0	0	

=== Matches ===
Win Draw Loss

14 September 1947 Round 1	SCU El Biar	2–1	USM Alger	El Biar
14:00	Ferrer Badin (?)	Report	Rabah Zouaoui (?)
Note: Lineup for USM Alger - , , , , , , , , , , .

21 September 1947 Round 2	US Blida	2–1	USM Alger	Blida
14:00	Perez George 57'; Padilla 60'	Report	Rabah Zouaoui 45'	Stadium: Stade de l'USB
Note: Lineup for USM Alger - , , , , , , , , , , .

5 October 1947 Round 3	USM Alger	5–0	O Rouiba	Fort de l'Eau
14:00	Rabah Zouaoui (?); Abdelkader Djaknoun (?); Rabah Bedaréne (?); Ahmed Azzouz (?); ? (?)	Report
Note: Lineup for USM Alger - , , , , , , , , , , .

12 October 1947 Round 4	O Tizi Ouzou	0–2	USM Alger	Tizi Ouzou
14:00		Report	Ouaguenouni (?); Rabah Zouaoui (?)
Note: Lineup for USM Alger - , , , , , , , , , , .

19 October 1947 Round 5	USM Alger	4–1	AS Trèfle Alger	Guyotville
14:00	Rabah Zouaoui (?); Rabah Bedaréne (?)	Report
Note: Lineup for USM Alger - , , , , , , , , , , .

16 November 1947 Round 6	USM Alger	3–1	US Fort de l'Eau	Fort de l'Eau
14:00	Rabah Zouaoui (?) (?) (?)	Report	? (?)	Referee: Pellegreneschi
Note: Lineup for USM Alger - , , , , , , , , , , .

27 December 1947 Round 7	SA Belcourt	0–4	USM Alger	Maison Carrée
14:00		Report	Mohamed Hamdi (?); El Kamal (?)	Referee: Attanasio

30 November 1947 Round 8	USM Alger	2–0	US Ain-Taya	Hydra
14:00	Kamal Benhaddad (?); Ammar Chaouane (?)	Report		Referee: Farrer

13 December 1947 Round 9	AS Rivet	1–3	USM Alger	Rivet
14:00		Report	Kamal Benhaddad (?); Abdelkader Djaknoun (?); Rabah Zouaoui (?)

15 February 1948 Round 10	USM Alger	2–1	SCU El Biar	Algiers
14:00	Rabah Zouaoui (?); Ahmed Azzouz (?)	Report	Ferrer Badin (?)	Stadium: Stade municipal

24 January 1948 Round 11	USM Alger	1–1	US Blida	Rouiba
14:00	Mohamed Hamdi (?)		? (?)

1 February 1948 Round 13	USM Alger	1–0	O Tizi Ouzou	Kouba
14:00	Rabah Zouaoui (?)	Report

8 February 1948 Round 12	O Rouiba	1–0	USM Alger	Rouiba
14:00	Allés 75'	Report		Referee: Boccechiampe

22 February 1948 Round 14	AS Trèfle Alger	0–5	USM Alger	Ben Rouila
14:00		Report	El Kamal (?); Rabah Zouaoui (?); Rabah Bedaréne (?); Chaouane (?); ? (?)

28 February 1948 Round 15	US Fort de l'Eau	0–0	USM Alger	Hussein Dey
14:00		Report

13 March 1948 Round 16	USM Alger	2–0	SA Belcourt	Kouba
14:00	Rabah Zouaoui (?) (?)	Report		Referee: Buono

21 March 1948 Round 17	US Ain-Taya	0–1	USM Alger	Aïn Taya
14:00		Report	El Kamal (?)

28 March 1948 Round 18	USM Alger	2–1	AS Rivet	Kouba
14:00	Rabah Zouaoui (?); El Kamal (?)	Report

==== Promotion Playoff ====
17 April 1948	Stade Guyotville	3–0	USM Alger
14:00	Cambresi (?); Monset (?); Vitiello (?)	Report		Referee: Attanasio

24 April 1948	ASPTT Alger	2–0	USM Alger	Saint Eugène
14:00		Report		Stadium: Stade Roger Lapergue

=== Forconi Cup ===
The Algiers League with the approval of the F.F.F.A, decided to add another team to the list of qualifiers for the North African Cup. According to the draw, Stade Guyotville was to face ASPTT Alger, and the winner would meet USM Alger in a decisive playoff match. On January 25, 1948, the highly anticipated encounter between USM Alger and Stade Guyotville took place at the Saint Eugène Stadium. The match began in a tense atmosphere due to its importance, and nervousness quickly translated into rough and violent play on the field. USMA opened the scoring in the first half through El Kamal, before Rabah Bedarane doubled the lead early in the second half. The domination continued when Rabah Zouaoui netted a superb direct free kick to make it 3–0, and at that point, USMA seemed destined for qualification.

However, the game took a dramatic turn when player Chaouane Ammar was injured following harsh tackles from the opposing defenders, forcing him to leave the pitch. From there, the situation spiraled out of control: Stade Guyotville pulled two quick goals back, then equalized 3–3 just minutes later. The tension escalated further when the referee awarded a controversial penalty against USMA, coupled with the sending off of Chaouane Abdelkader. Unable to accept what he saw as blatant injustice, Chaouane tried to argue with the referee, but to no avail. Overcome by anger, he lost his temper and physically assaulted the referee, striking him violently. The match was abandoned twenty minutes before full time, with chaos erupting as fans invaded the pitch and the police had to intervene.

Following the incidents, the League submitted its report and imposed heavy sanctions: USM Alger was expelled from the competition, and its points were erased. Chaouane Abdelkader was banned for life from football due to his assault on the referee. USMA was fined 1,000 francs because of its supporters’ misconduct. Stade Guyotville was declared qualified to the next round.

7 September 1947 Second Round	USM Alger	2–1	SCU El Biar	Hydra
15:30	Mustapha El Kamal; Chaouane	Report
Note: Lineup for USM Alger - Zitouni, Mustapha El Kamal, Allel Ouaguenouni, Abdelkader Chaouane, Ammar Chaouane, Mustapha Ouaguenouni, Mohamed Hamdi, Ismaïl Mahmoudi, Ben Guenife, Zouaoui, Benhaddad.

28 September 1947 Third Round	USM Alger	4–0	Bouira AC	Palestro
13:30	El Kamal; Rabah Zouaoui	Report
Note: Lineup for USM Alger - , , , , , , , , , , .

26 October 1947 Round of 32	USM Alger	3–1	ÉS Zéralda	Guyotville
14:00	Abdelkader Djaknoun; Ouaguenouni	Report
Note: Lineup for USM Alger - , , , , , , , , , , .

7 December 1947 Round of 16	USM Alger	1–0	SC Algérois	Saint Eugène
14:00	Abdelkader Djaknoun 25'	Report		Stadium: Stade Roger Lapergue
Note: Lineup for USM Alger - Zitouni, Hamdi, Allel Ouaguenouni, Mustapha Ouaguenouni, Toubal, Chaouane, Djaknoun, Bedaréne, Zouaoui, Benhaddad, El Kamal.

4 January 1948 Quarter-final	USM Alger	0–2	MC Alger	Algiers
14:00		Report	Hahad 49'; El Mahdaoui 64'	Stadium: Stade municipal
Note: Lineup for USM Alger - Hassen Zitouni, Mohamed Hamdi, Abdelkader Chaouane, Allel Ouaguenouni, Mustapha Ouaguenouni, Benhaddad, Elkamal, Ammar Chaouane, Rabah Zouaoui, Bedaréne, Djaknoun.

== Squad information ==
=== Goalscorers ===
Includes all competitive matches. The list is sorted alphabetically by surname when total goals are equal.

Nat.	Player	PD	PO	FC	TOTAL
(France)	Rabah Zouaoui	13	0	2	15
(France)	Ali El Kamal	6	0	0	6
(France)	Rabah Bedaréne	4	0	0	4
(France)	Abdelkader Djaknoun	2	0	2	4
(France)	Ahmed Azzouz	2	0	0	2
(France)	Mohamed Hamdi	2	0	0	2
(France)	Kamal Benhaddad	2	0	0	2
(France)	Mustapha El Kamal	0	0	1	1
(France)	Ammar Chaouane	1	0	0	1
(France)	Chaouane	1	0	0	1
Own Goals		1	0	0	1
Totals		39	0	10	49
