= 1939–40 USM Alger season =

USM Alger
1939–40 season
- President: Arezki Meddad
- Stadium: Stade le Bon, Algiers
- First Division: 6th
- Coupe de la Ligue: Round of 16
- Coupe de la Solidarité: Round of 16
- Top goalscorer: League: Abdellah Betouche (5 goals); All: Abdellah Betouche (6 goals)

In the 1939–40 season, USM Alger is competing in the First Division for the 3rd season French colonial era, as well as the Forconi Cup. They will be competing in First Division, Coupe de la Ligue, and the Coupe de la Solidarité.

== Review ==
During the months of September and October, the Algiers League (L.A.F.A.) held several sessions, meetings, and discussions with club representatives to assess the possibility of continuing competitions, to consider organizational reforms suited to the new situation, and to find appropriate solutions, including the adoption of new regulations. It was agreed to maintain football activity in the form of a unified transitional championship called the Championnat de guerre de la Ligue d'Alger. This competition would bring together teams from the three divisions. Honor Division, First Division, and Second Division that expressed and confirmed their willingness to participate.

Based on match coverage and press commentary throughout the season, USM Alger played its home matches at Stade le Bon and wore either purple and black or red and white kits, according to sports journalists of the time writing in various sports pages. The standout players included goalkeeper Abderrahman Ibrir, who was also the keeper for the Algiers city team and later turned professional with Toulouse FC in France. Another key player was the brilliant Mohamed Hamdi, whose name was often chanted by the fans, as well as the excellent Mokrane Karassane. USM Alger entered the Algiers championship with modest experience and faced seasoned and well established teams, ultimately delivering a very modest season performance.

== Squad list ==
USM Alger squad list.
1 Abderrahman Ibrir	2 Franck Balik	3 Benyoucef Benhoura	4 Ali Slimani	5 Mokrane Hadj Rabia
6 Mohamed Hamdi	7 Ramadan Boumedrar	8 Ivian Oltra	9 Nacer Nini	10 Rodenas
11 Abdellah Betouche	12 Maâmar Haouari	13 M'hamed Idriss	14 Youssef Choudar	15 Roni Gabiatti
16 M'hamed Nasri	17 Mokrane Karassane	18 Paul Ramon	19 Doucet	20 Nekhal
21 Mohamed Bouaroub	22 Abdelkader Bouaroub	23 Mouloud Oalmi	24 Abdelkader Zouani	25 Abdelkader Zetouchi
26 Ali Zemmouri	27 Boualem Bournani	28	29	30

== Competitions ==
=== Overview ===
Competition	Record							
Competition	G	W	D	L	GF	GA	GD	Win %
Championnat	12	2	1	9	18	21	−3	16.67
Coupe de la Ligue	1	0	0	1	1	4	−3	0.00
Coupe de la Solidarité	1	0	1	0	1	1	+0	0.00
Total	14	2	2	10	20	26	−6	14.29

== League table ==
=== Group A ===
1939–40 League Algiers Standings

Pos	Team	Pld	W	D	L	F	A	GD	Pts	Notes
1	RU Alger	12	10	1	1	0	0	0	33	Participates in the first tournament
2	AS Saint Eugène	12	8	2	2	0	0	0	30	
3	O Tizi Ouzou	12	7	2	3	0	0	0	28	
4	O. Rouïba	12	6	1	5	0	0	0	27	
5	RS Alger	12	2	1	9	0	0	0	19	
6	USM Alger	12	2	1	9	18	21	-3	19	
7	US Alger	12	0	0	12	0	0	0	12	

=== Matches ===
Win Draw Loss

29 October 1939 Round 1	USM Alger	1–2	O. Rouïba	Ruisseau, Algiers
14:00	Mohamed Hamdi	Report	? ?	Stadium: Stade Lebon
Note: Lineup for USM Alger -

5 November 1939 Round 2	RU Alger	2–0	USM Alger	Belcourt
14:00	Cépi; Bernard Doubourg - Couard, Martaille, Tazairt, Ferrari, Esposito, Bru, Se Mourad, Bernard, Cépi, Chérif	Report	Franck, Mohamed Bouaroub, Benhoura, Oalmi, Hamdi, Zemmouri, Abdelkader Bouaroub, Hadj Rabia, Zouani, Choudar, Zetouchi	Stadium: Stade Municipal; Referee: Busso

26 November 1939 Round 4	AS Saint Eugène	2–0	USM Alger	Saint Eugène
14:45	? ?	Report		Stadium: Stade Communal Saint Eugène
Note: Lineup for USM Alger - Ibrir, Mohamed Bouaroub, Abdelkader Bouaroub, Benhoura, Idriss, Hamdi, Zemmouri, Slimani, boumedrar, Bournani, Betouche.

3 December 1939 Round 5	US Alger	0–7	USM Alger	Ruisseau, Algiers
14:00		Report	Bouaroub; Hadj Rabia; Youssef Choudar; Mohamed Hamdi; Betouche	Stadium: Stade Lebon; Referee: Puicrano

17 December 1939 Round 6	RS Alger	1–0	USM Alger	Hussein Dey
14:00	Poncetti 35'	Report		Stadium: Stade de Nouvel-Amber; Referee: Comte

7 January 1940 Round 7	USM Alger	1–4	O Tizi Ouzou	Hussein Dey
14:00	Betouche 35' Ibrir, Benhoura, Slimani, Karassane, Hamdi, Boumedrar, Ramon, Doucet, Rodenas, Betouche, Nekhal	Report	haouchine 76' Allouche (?) Boumedrar; Zélali Abtouche - Aougbi, Korogli, Bibi, Zélali, Carpentier, Geranton, Boudjemah, Allouche, Haouchine, Madiou	Stadium: Stade de Nouvel-Ambert; Referee: Pulcrano

14 January 1940 Round 8	O. Rouïba	1–0	USM Alger	Rouïba
14:00	Carréras	Report		Stadium: Stade de Rouïba

28 January 1940 Round 9	USM Alger	1–1	RU Alger	Saint Eugène
14:00	Mokrane Karassane Ibrir, Benhoura, Idriss, Slimani, Hamdi, Mokrane Karassane, Ramon, Mokrane Hadj Rabia, Rodenas, Betouche, Oltra	Report	Couard II 22' Doubourg - Marteille, Ferrare, Oliver, Samuel, Esposito, Hassen, Cépi, Couard II, Fazlin, Bru	Stadium: Stade Communal Saint Eugène; Referee: Garcia

18 February 1940 Round 11	AS Saint Eugène	2–0	USM Alger	Saint Eugène
14:00	De Villeneuve 70'; Castaldi Izzo, Lopez, Salva, Faner, Leber, Valensi, Castaldi, Bindinelli, Garcia, De Villeneuve, Tur	Report	Ibrir, Benhoura, Idriss, Hamdi, Karassane, Slimani, Oltra, Gabiatti, Rodenas, Betouche, Ramon	Stadium: Stade Communal Saint Eugène; Referee: Busso

25 February 1940 Round 12	USM Alger	5–1	US Alger	Saint Eugène
14:00	Benhoura; Ramoun; Hamdi; Betouche Ibrir, Benhoura, Idriss, Slimani, Hamdi, Boumedrar, Oltra, Gabiatti, Rodenas, Betouche, Mokrane Hadj Rabia	Report	Pappalardo Garcia, Ambrosio, Costa, Mengual, Ortiz, Scotto, Vachey, Pappalardo, Jacquet, Destoc, Ladroye	Stadium: Stade Communal Saint Eugène; Referee: Conte

10 March 1940 Round 13	USM Alger	0–2	RS Alger	Hussein Dey
14:00	Ibrir, Benhoura, Idriss, Slimani, Hamdi, Boumedrar, Oltra, Choudar, Rodenas, Betouche, Mokrane Hadj Rabia	Report	33' Blanés ? Boucquet, Pérez, Trinidad, Kaci, Bénaiche, Ribés, Blanés, Ghanem, Brunel, Poncetti, Ortola	Stadium: Stade de Nouvel-Ambert; Referee: Mousaoui

17 March 1940 Round 14	O Tizi Ouzou	3–1	USM Alger	Tizi Ouzou
14:00	Belhadj; Allouche Abtouche, Korogli, Aroundeau, Akroun, Zéllali, Bouzar, Geranton, Belhadj, Allouche, Haouchine, Mediou	Report	Hamdi 28' Ibrir, Benhoura, Slimani, Mokrane Hadj Rabia, Hamdi, Boumedrar, Oltra, Nini, Rodenas, Betouche, Haouari.	Stadium: Stade Municipal Arsène Weinman

== Coupe de la Ligue ==
21 April 1940 Round of 16	US Blida	4–1	USM Alger	Saint Eugène
14:00	Mahieddine (?); Oussedik (?) Bailly - Martinez, Fredj, Hamidouche, Yaya, Jean, Mahieddine, Pérez, Oussedik, Albert, Pélisser	Report	Rodenas (?) Ibrir - Idriss, Benhoura, Hadj Rabia, Hamdi, Boumedrar, Oltra, Betouche, Rodenas, Nasri, Haouari	Stadium: Stade Communal Saint Eugène

== Coupe de la Solidarité ==
19 November 1939 Round of 16	Stade Algérois	1–1	USM Alger	Saint Eugène
:	Yaccoub - Bouznane, Saéz, Dumas, Kabatou, Mayence, Crespo, Cervera, Santiago, Koenig, Gélabert	Report	Betouche 55' Ibrir - Slimani, Benhoura, Bouaroub I, Hamdi, Zemouri, Choudar, Boumedrar, Hadj Rabia, Betouche, Bournani	Stadium: Stade Communal Saint Eugène; Referee: Garcia

== Squad information ==
=== Playing statistics ===
In Round of 16 of Coupe de la Solidarité, it is not known who was the player who participated, Mohamed Bouaroub or Abdelkader Bouaroub.

Pos.	Name	League Algiers												CDl	CDs	Total
Pos.	Name	1	2	4	5	6	7	8	9	11	12	13	14	1	1	Total
GK	(France) Abderrahman Ibrir			X			X		X	X	X	X	X	X	X	9
GK	(France) Franck Balik		X													1
	(France) Benyoucef Benhoura		X	X			X		X	X	X	X	X	X	X	10
	(France) Ali Slimani			X			X		X	X	X	X	X		X	8
	(France) Mokrane Hadj Rabia		X						X		X	X	X	X	X	7
	(France) Mohamed Hamdi		X	X			X		X	X	X	X	X	X	X	10
	(France) Ramadan Boumedrar			X			X				X	X	X	X	X	7
	(France) Ivian Oltra								X	X	X	X	X	X		6
	(France) Nacer Nini												X			1
	(France) Rodenas						X		X	X	X	X	X	X		7
	(France) Abdellah Betouche			X			X		X	X	X	X	X	X	X	9
	(France) Maâmar Haouari												X	X		2
	(France) M'hamed Idriss			X					X	X	X	X		X		6
	(France) Youssef Choudar		X									X			X	3
	(France) Roni Gabiatti									X	X					2
	(France) M'hamed Nasri													X		1
	(France) Mokrane Karassane						X		X	X						3
	(France) Paul Ramon						X		X	X						3
	(France) Doucet						X									1
	(France) Nekhal						X									1
	(France) Mohamed Bouaroub		X	X												2
	(France) Abdelkader Bouaroub		X	X												2
	(France) Mouloud Oalmi		X													1
	(France) Abdelkader Zouani		X													1
	(France) Abdelkader Zetouchi		X													1
	(France) Ali Zemmouri		X	X											X	3
	(France) Boualem Bournani			X											X	2

=== Goalscorers ===
Includes all competitive matches. The list is sorted alphabetically by surname when total goals are equal.

Nat.	Player	PD	CDl	CDs	TOTAL
(France)	Abdellah Betouche	5	0	1	6
(France)	Mohamed Hamdi	4	0	0	4
(France)	Bouaroub	2	0	0	2
(France)	Mokrane Karassane	1	0	0	1
(France)	Benyoucef Benhoura	1	0	0	1
(France)	Paul Ramon	1	0	0	1
(France)	Rodenas	0	1	0	1
(France)	Youssef Choudar	1	0	0	1
(France)	Mokrane Hadj Rabia	1	0	0	1
Own Goals		0	0	0	0
Totals		16	1	1	18
