= 1940–41 USM Alger season =

USM Alger
1940–41 season
- President: Arezki Meddad
- Third Division: 3rd
- Coupe de la Ligue: Second Round

In the 1940–41 season, USM Alger is competing in the Third Division for the 4th season French colonial era, as well as the Forconi Cup. They will be competing in First Division, and the Coupe de la Ligue.

== Review ==
Starting in July 1940, the league initiated a series of meetings and discussions with club representatives to examine issues related to the new season and the preparatory measures to be taken. In this context, USM Alger began its preparations for the competition as early as August. Player licenses were made available for signing at the Belcourt office, specifically at the Alcazar café on rue de l’Union, as well as at the club’s official headquarters on rue Devon, at the home of Mr. Meddad. The club also announced the resumption of training starting on August 23. These sessions were held at the Bainem Stadium, in a gym in Belcourt, and at the P.C.M.A. Hall in algiers.

One of the notable developments during this period was the departure of USMA's goalkeeper, Abderrahmane Ibrir, who transferred to AS Saint Eugène. Ibrir would go on to shine with that club, which enjoyed better conditions compared to USM Alger. On September 7, 1940, USMA’s management held a general assembly at the Bainem Stadium, attended by nearly all the players and a large number of supporters. During this assembly, several updates were announced, and some organizational shortcomings were addressed, all with the goal of ensuring continuity and maintaining the serious work that had already begun.

After several meetings and consultations, the league decided based on the number of clubs meeting the necessary criteria to modify the structure of the amateur championships in Algeria compared to the previous season, which was known as the War championship. These changes led to the creation of the following competitions: the Critérium de Division d'Honneur, the Critérium de 1re Division, and the Critérium des 2e et 3e Divisions.

== Competitions ==
=== Overview ===
Competition	Record							
Competition	G	W	D	L	GF	GA	GD	Win %
Third Division	10	5	2	3	24	10	+14	50.00
Coupe de la Ligue	1	0	0	1	2	4	−2	0.00
Total	11	5	2	4	26	14	+12	45.45

== League table ==
=== Group B ===
Pos	Team	Pld	W	D	L	F	A	GD	Pts	Notes
1	ES Cherchell	10	0	0	0	0	0	0	26	
2	CA Paté	10	0	0	0	0	0	0	25	
3	USM Alger	10	5	2	3	24	10	+14	22	
4	US Alger	10	0	0	0	0	0	0	17	
5	FC Kouba	10	0	0	0	0	0	0	17	
6	SC Algérois	10	0	0	0	0	0	0	11	

=== Matches ===
Win Draw Loss

27 October 1940 Round 1	US Alger	0–4	USM Alger	Saint Eugène
14:00		Report		Stadium: Stade Communal de Saint Eugène

17 November 1940 Round 2	USM Alger	0–1	Club Cherchell	Baïnem
14:00		Report

8 December 1940 Round 3	CA Paté	2–2	USM Alger	Le Bon
14:00		Report

22 December 1940 Round 4	SC Algérois	0–8	USM Alger	Baïnem
14:00

5 January 1941 Round 5	USM Alger	2–0	FC Kouba	Maison-Carrée
14:00				Stadium: Stade Lavigerie

19 January 1941 Round 6	USM Alger	3–1	US Alger	Baïnem
14:00

2 February 1941 Round 7	Club Cherchell	1–1	USM Alger	Cherchell
14:00

23 February 1941 Round 8	USM Alger	0–1	CA Paté	Baïnem
14:00		Report

16 March 1941 Round 9	USM Alger	3–1	SC Algérois	Belcourt
14:00				Stadium: Stade Municipal

6 April 1941 Round 10	FC Kouba	3–1	USM Alger	Belcourt
14:00				Stadium: Stade Municipal

== Coupe de la Ligue ==
3 November 1940 First Round	USM Alger	4–2	Olympique Pointe-Pescade	Guyotville
13:00		Report		Stadium: Stade Guyotville
Note: OPP gagnant sur réserves
