= Mohamed Kouradji =

Algerian football referee (1952–2020)

- Born: 14 March 1952; Constantine, Algeria
- Died: 9 July 2020 (aged 68); Constantine, Algeria
- Occupation: Football referee

Mohamed Kouradji (14 March 1952 – 9 July 2020) was an Algerian football referee.

== Biography ==
Born in Constantine, Kouradji began refereeing in the 1980s. He refereed several international matches, including the qualifying for the 1994 Africa Cup of Nations, the 1994 FIFA World Cup, the 1998 FIFA World Cup qualification, and a 1996 Africa Cup game in South Africa between Angola and Cameroon.

Kouradji refereed the 1995–96 Algerian Cup championship game between MC Oran and USM Bilda. He retired from refereeing in 1998 after a 20-year career. He then worked as an executive at SIMCO and a director with the Ligue inter-régions de football.

Mohamed Kouradji died on 9 July 2020, in his hometown of Constantine at the age of 68, from COVID-19 during the COVID-19 pandemic in Algeria.
