= Abdelkader Tlemçani =

Algerian footballer and manager (born 1963)

Personal information
- Full name: Abdelkader Tlemçani
- Date of birth: 1 December 1963 (age 62)
- Place of birth: Oran, Algeria
- Height: 1.80 m (5 ft 11 in)
- Position: Striker

Youth career
- RCG Oran

Senior career*
Years	Team	Apps	(Gls)
1981–1983	RCG Oran	–	(–)
1983–1986	ASM Oran	–	(–)
1986–1991	USM Bel Abbès	–	(–)
1991–1992	MAS Fez	–	(–)
1992–1993	Raja Casablanca	–	(–)
1993–1995	MC Oran	–	(–)
1995–1996	USM Bel Abbès	–	(–)
1996–1997	WA Mostaganem	–	(–)
1997–2001	RCG Oran	–	(–)

International career
1985–1989	Algeria	17	(1)
- * Club domestic league appearances and goals

Abdelkader Tlemçani (Arabic: عبد القادر تلمساني) (born 1 December 1963) is an Algerian football manager and former international player.

== Honours ==
=== Clubs ===
USM Bel Abbès

- Algerian Cup: 1991

Raja Casablanca

- Moroccan Championship: Runner-up 1993

MC Oran

- Algerian Championship: Runner-up 1995
