= Bendel United F.C. =

Nigerian football club

Bendel United Football Club (formerly Flash Flamingoes) is a Nigerian football club based in Uromi, Edo State.

== History ==
In the shadows of other Benin City teams such as Bendel Insurance and New Nigeria Bank, Rubber Board football club was founded in the early 1980s. The team was subsequently sold and bought over by Chief Patrick Osakwe, currently a Senator for Delta State and at the time the owner of Flash pools who renamed the team Flash Flamingoes. It cannot be ascertained whether the team took its name from a moniker used by Stationery Stores, then the most fashionable team in Nigeria. They were promoted to the Nigerian Premier League in 1985.

After placing 2nd in the 1988 Nigerian FA Cup, the team was bought by Bendel State governor Tunde Ogbeha and renamed Bendel United and the next season placed 4th in the Nigerian League. It made it to the finals of the African Cup Winners' Cup before losing 1–0 on aggregate to Al-Merrikh. Bendel United was relegated to the Second Division in 1992 and played three seasons there before being relegated again to the 3rd division for one season. Returning to the 2nd level in 1997, they never could regain their old form and were relegated from the Professional League in 2005.

In 2006, the team was bought by controversial owner Igbinowahia Ekhosuehi from Solomon Edebiri and renamed Esan FC.

After being on hiatus, Edebiri announced plans in 2013 to resurrect the team under the name Bendel United.

== Achievements ==
- Nigerian FA Cup
  - Runners-up (1): 1988
- African Cup Winners' Cup
  - Runners-up (1): 1989

== Team names ==
- 1984–1988: Flash Flamingoes
- 1989–2006: Bendel United
- 2006–2012: Esan
- 2014–present: Bendel United
