= Yacine Bentalaa =

Algerian footballer (born 1955)

Yassin bentaalla
Personal information
- Full name: Yassin Bentaalla
- Date of birth: September 24, 1955 (age 71)
- Place of birth: Algeria
- Height: 1.83 m (6 ft 0 in)
- Position: Goalkeeper

International career
Years	Team	Apps	(Gls)
- Algeria

Yassin Bentaalla (born September 24, 1955) is an Algerian former professional footballer who played as a goalkeeper. He was a member of the Algerian team at the 1982 FIFA World Cup in Spain. He is currently the goalkeeping coach at Al Wasl FC, a position he has occupied since 1993.

== Club career ==
During his playing career, Bentalaa played for UPC Salembier, NA Hussein Dey, RC Kouba and USM Alger.

== International career ==
Bentalaa was a member of the Algeria national team at the 1982 FIFA World Cup in Spain.
