= 1989 African Cup Winners' Cup =

Tournament details
- Dates: April - 9 December 1989
- Teams: 33 (from 1 confederation)

Final positions
- Champions: (Sudan) Al-Merrikh (1st title)
- Runners-up: (Nigeria) Bendel United F.C.

Tournament statistics
- Matches played: 57
- Goals scored: 113 (1.98 per match)

The 1989 season of the African Cup Winners' Cup football club tournament was won by Al Merreikh in two-legged final victory against Bendel United F.C. This was the fifteenth season that the tournament took place for the winners of each African country's domestic cup. Thirty-three sides entered the competition, with UDIB, Al Ahly (Tripoli) and Nakivubo Villa SC all withdrawing before the 1st leg of the first round.

== Preliminary round ==
Team 1	Agg.	Team 2	1st leg	2nd leg
Moneni Pirates (Eswatini)	2-1	Lesotho Defence Force FC	2-0	0-1

== First round ==
Team 1	Agg.	Team 2	1st leg	2nd leg
ASI Abengourou (Ivory Coast)	w/o^{1}	(Guinea-Bissau) Internacional	w/o	w/o
Al-Merrikh (Sudan)	w/o^{2}	(Libya) Al-Ahly (Tripoli)	w/o	w/o
Kamsar (Guinea)	0-1	(Tunisia) CA Bizerte	0-0	0-1
Coastal Union (Tanzania)	2-5	(Mozambique) Costa do Sol	2-3	0-2
Diamond Stars F.C. (Sierra Leone)	0-2	(Nigeria) Bendel United	0-0	0-2
Dynamos F.C. (Zimbabwe)	1-2	(Madagascar) FC BFV	1-1	0-1
Etincelles FC (Rwanda)	2-1	(Burundi) Vital'O	1-1	1-0
ASF Bobo (Burkina Faso)	2-2^{3}	(Senegal) ASC Linguère	1-0	1-2
Gor Mahia (Kenya)	w/o^{4}	(Uganda) Nakivubo Villa	w/o	w/o
Liberté FC (Niger)	1-4	(Algeria) Union d'Alger (Note: Union d'Alger was the name of USM Alger between 1987-88 and 1988-89 seasons, so in september 1989 the club played the quarter-finals under its historical name, USM Alger.)	1-0	0-4
Moneni Pirates (Eswatini)	1-6	(Zambia) Power Dynamos	1-1	0-5
Panthère du Ndé (Cameroon)	1-2	(Liberia) LPRC Oilers	0-0	1-2
Stade Malien (Mali)	3-0	(Tunisia) CO Transports	3-0	0-0
TP USCA Bangui (Central African Republic)	3-5	(Zaire) AS Kalamu	3-3	0-2
Union Vesper (Equatorial Guinea)	0-3	(Republic of the Congo) Patronage Sainte-Anne	0-1	0-2
Vantour Mangoungou (Gabon)	2-3	(Angola) Sagrada Esperança	1-0	1-3

- 1: UDIB withdrew.
- 2: Al-Ahly withdrew.
- 3: ASF Bobo won on away goals.
- 4: Nakivubo Villa withdrew.

== Second round ==
Team 1	Agg.	Team 2	1st leg	2nd leg
ASI Abengourou (Ivory Coast)	3-4	(Liberia) LPRC Oilers	3-2	0-2
FC BFV (Madagascar)	4-3	(Zambia) Power Dynamos	1-2	3-1
CA Bizerte (Tunisia)	1-2	(Sudan) Al-Merrikh	1-0	0-2
Costa do Sol (Mozambique)	1-2	(Kenya) Gor Mahia	1-2	0-0
Etincelles FC (Rwanda)	0-1	(Zaire) AS Kalamu	0-0	0-1
ASF Bobo (Burkina Faso)	1-5	(Nigeria) Bendel United	1-3	0-2
Patronage Sainte-Anne (Republic of the Congo)	2-1	(Angola) Sagrada Esperança	2-1	0-0
Stade Malien (Mali)	1-1^{1}	(Algeria) Union d'Alger	1-0	0-1

- 1: Union d'Alger won 4-3 PSO.

== Quarter-finals ==
Team 1	Agg.	Team 2	1st leg	2nd leg
Al-Merrikh (Sudan)	3-1	(Republic of the Congo) Patronage Sainte-Anne	2-0	1-1
Bendel United (Nigeria)	3-0	(Zaire) AS Kalamu	2-0	1-0
Gor Mahia (Kenya)	3-1	(Liberia) LPRC Oilers	0-0	3-1
USM Alger (Algeria)	1-2^{1}	(Madagascar) FC BFV	1-3	n/p

- 1: USM Alger withdrew after the first leg.

== Semifinals ==
Team 1	Agg.	Team 2	1st leg	2nd leg
Bendel United (Nigeria)	4-1	(Madagascar) FC BFV	4-1	0-0
Gor Mahia (Kenya)	1-2	(Sudan) Al-Merrikh	1-0	0-2

== Final ==
Team 1	Agg.	Team 2	1st leg	2nd leg
Al-Merrikh (Sudan)	1-0	(Nigeria) Bendel United	1-0	0-0

== Champions ==
African Cup Winners' Cup Winners
(Sudan)
Al-Merrikh
First title
