= FC BFV =

Malagasy football club

BFV
- Full name: FC BFV
- Ground: Mahamasina Stadium; Antananarivo, Madagascar
- Capacity: 22,000
- League: Malagasy Second Division

FC BFV ( FC Banky Fandrosoana ny Varotra : Trade Development Bank FC) is a Malagasy football club based in Antananarivo, Madagascar. The team has won the THB Champions League in 1996, qualifying them for the 1997 CAF Champions League.

The team currently plays in the Malagasy Second Division.

== Achievements ==
- THB Champions League: 1

1996

== Performance in CAF competitions ==
- CAF Champions League: 1 appearance

1997 CAF Champions League - first round

- African Cup Winners Cup

Semi-finals 1989
