= Fawzi Benkhalidi =

Algerian footballer (born 1963)

Faouzi Benkhalidi
Personal information
- Full name: Faouzi Abderrezak Benkhalidi
- Date of birth: 3 February 1963 (age 63)
- Place of birth: Algeria
- Position: Attacking midfielder

Senior career*
| Years | Team | Apps | (Gls) |
| 1976–1986 | Olympique de Médéa | | |
| 1986–1987 | WA Boufarik | | |
| 1987–1990 | USM Alger | | |
| 1990–1992 | Olympique de Médéa | | |
| 1992–1994 | USM Alger | | |

International career
| 1984–1986 | Algeria | 10 | (2) |
- * Club domestic league appearances and goals

Faouzi Abderrezak Benkhalidi (born 3 February 1963) is an Algerian former football forward who played for Algeria in the 1986 FIFA World Cup. He also played for WA Boufarik.
