= Yahia Boushaki =

Yahia Boushaki Arabic: يحي بوسحاقي Kabyle: ⵢⴰⵃⵢⴰ ⴱⵓⵙⵃⴰⵇⵉ
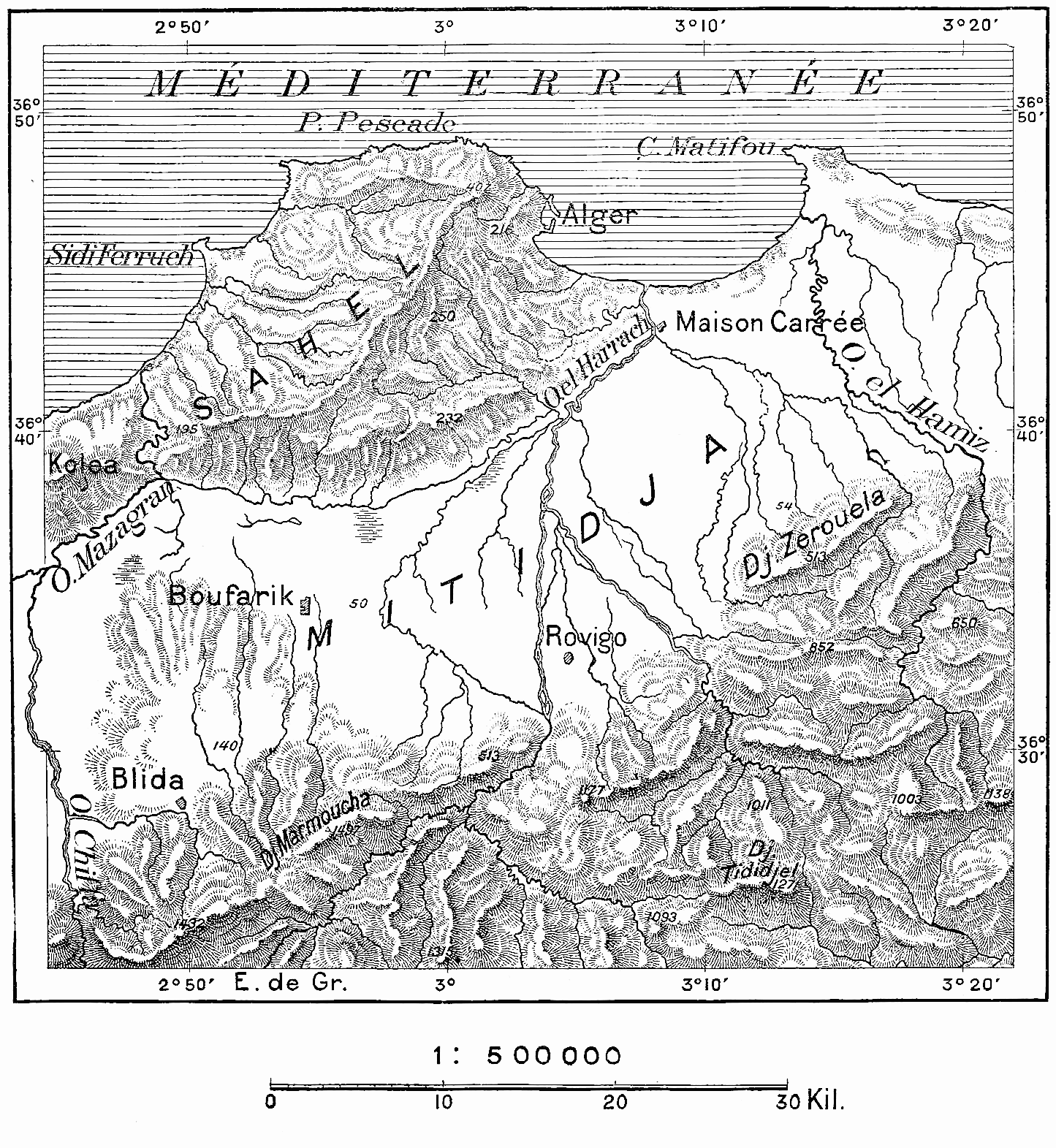
- Yahia Boushaki in Kabylie and Mitidja
- Coordinates: 36.7227018°N 3.1726698°E
- Country: Algeria
- Province: Algiers Province
- District: Dar El Beïda District
- Commune: Bab Ezzouar
- Region: Kabylie

Yahia Boushaki (Arabic: يحي بوسحاقي, Kabyle: ⵢⴰⵃⵢⴰ ⴱⵓⵙⵃⴰⵇⵉ) is a residential, administrative and commercial neighbourhood in Algiers, located in the commune of Bab Ezzouar in Algeria. It is known to be a Chinatown.

== History ==
The neighbourhood was created by decree of November 8, 1978, as part of the development of the city of Algiers. It is named after the revolutionary leader Yahia Boushaki.

== Transport ==
=== Train ===
- Bab Ezzouar Railway Station
- Dar El Beïda Railway Station
- Oued Smar Railway Station

=== Tramway ===
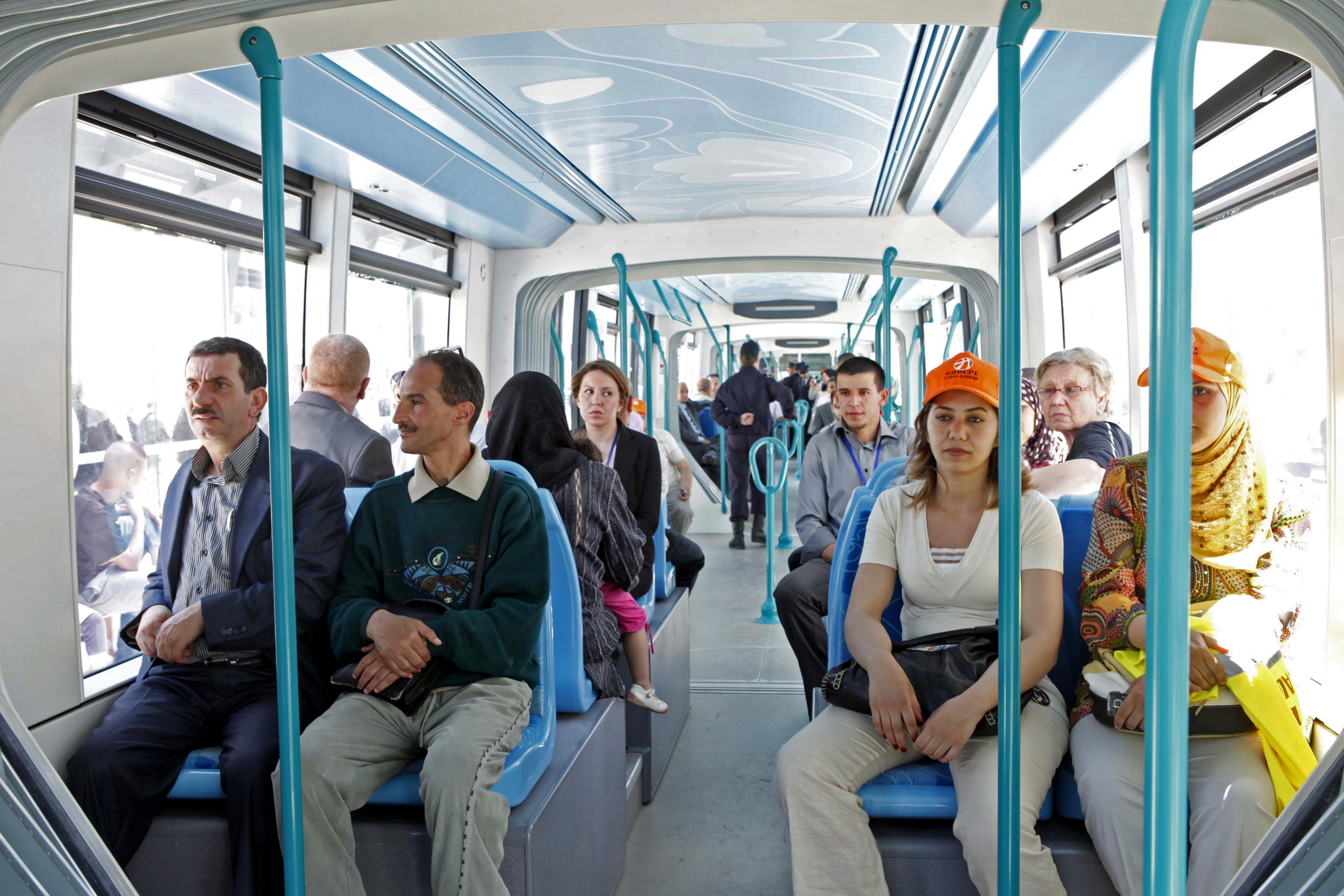
Tramway d'Alger

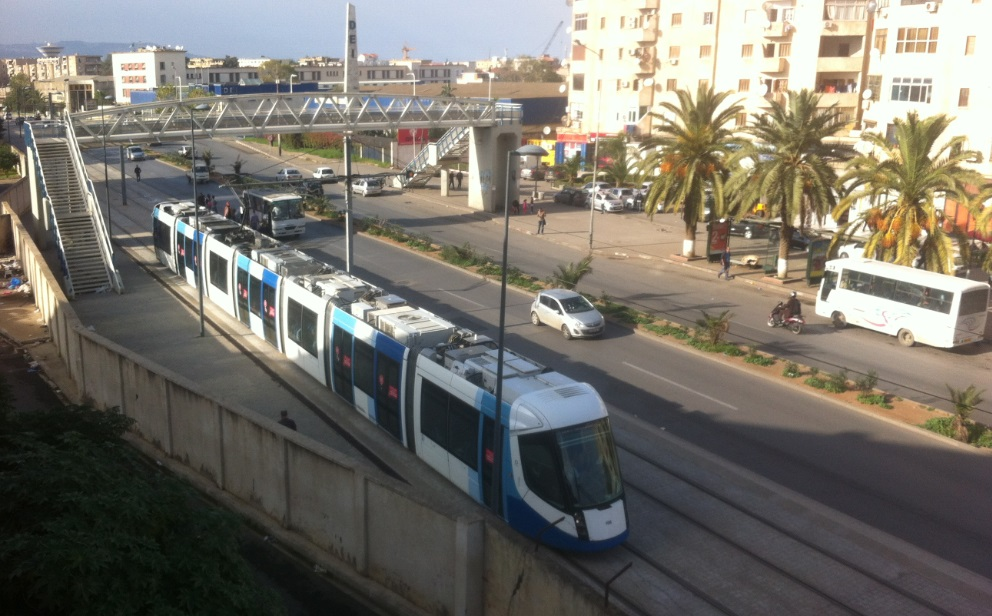
Tramway d'Alger

	Stations	Communes	Correspondence
•	Tamaris	Mohammadia
•	Cité Mokhtar Zerhouni	Mohammadia
•	Yahia Boushaki tram stop	Bab Ezzouar
•	Université de Bab Ezzouar (USTHB)	Bab Ezzouar
•	Cité 5 juillet	Bab Ezzouar
•	Bab Ezzouar - Le Pont	Bab Ezzouar
•	Cité universitaire - CUB1	Bab Ezzouar
•	Cité 8 mai 1945	Bab Ezzouar
•	Clair Matin	Bordj El Kiffan
•	Bordj El Kiffan - Lycée	Bordj El Kiffan

== Gallery ==
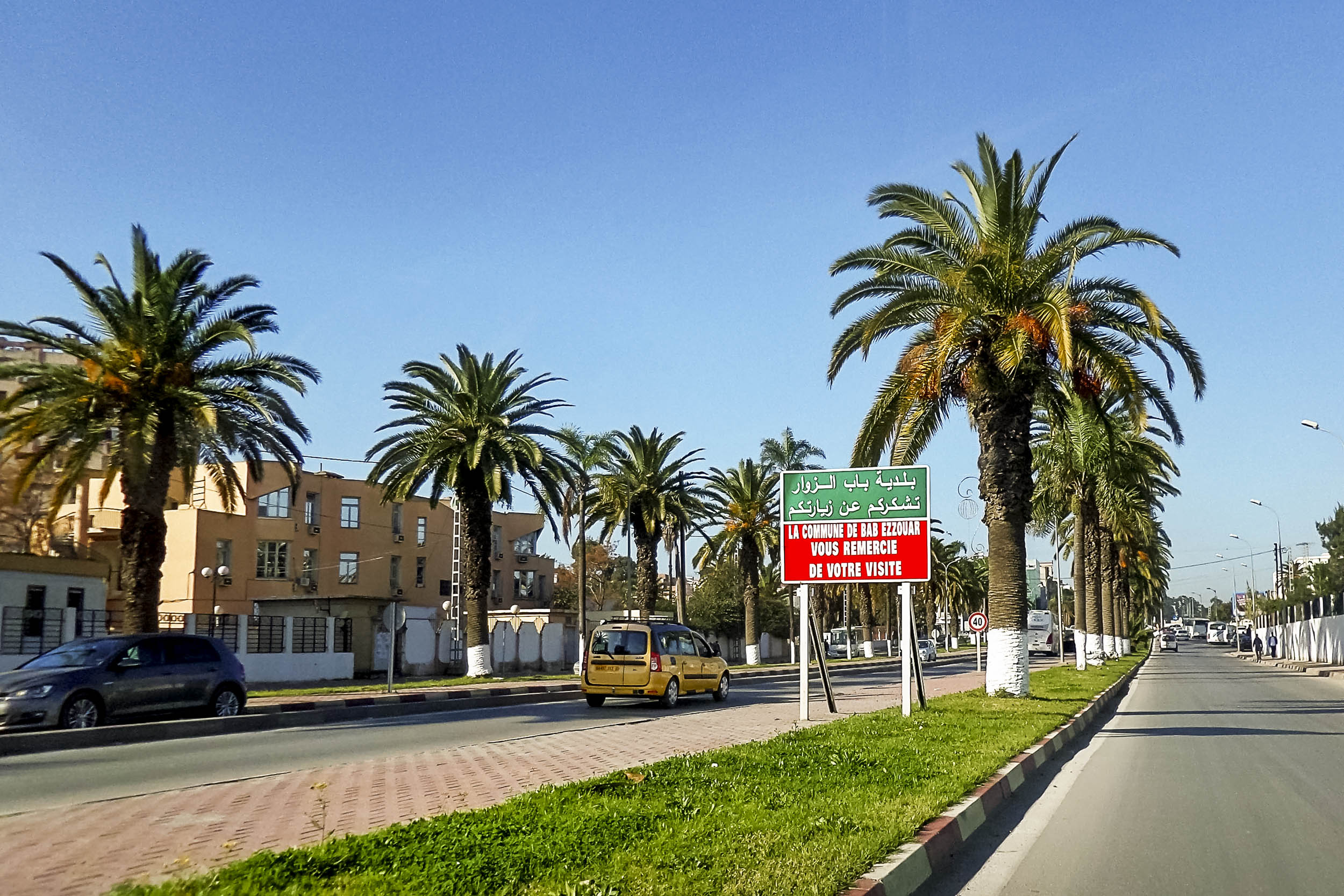
Bab Ezzouar

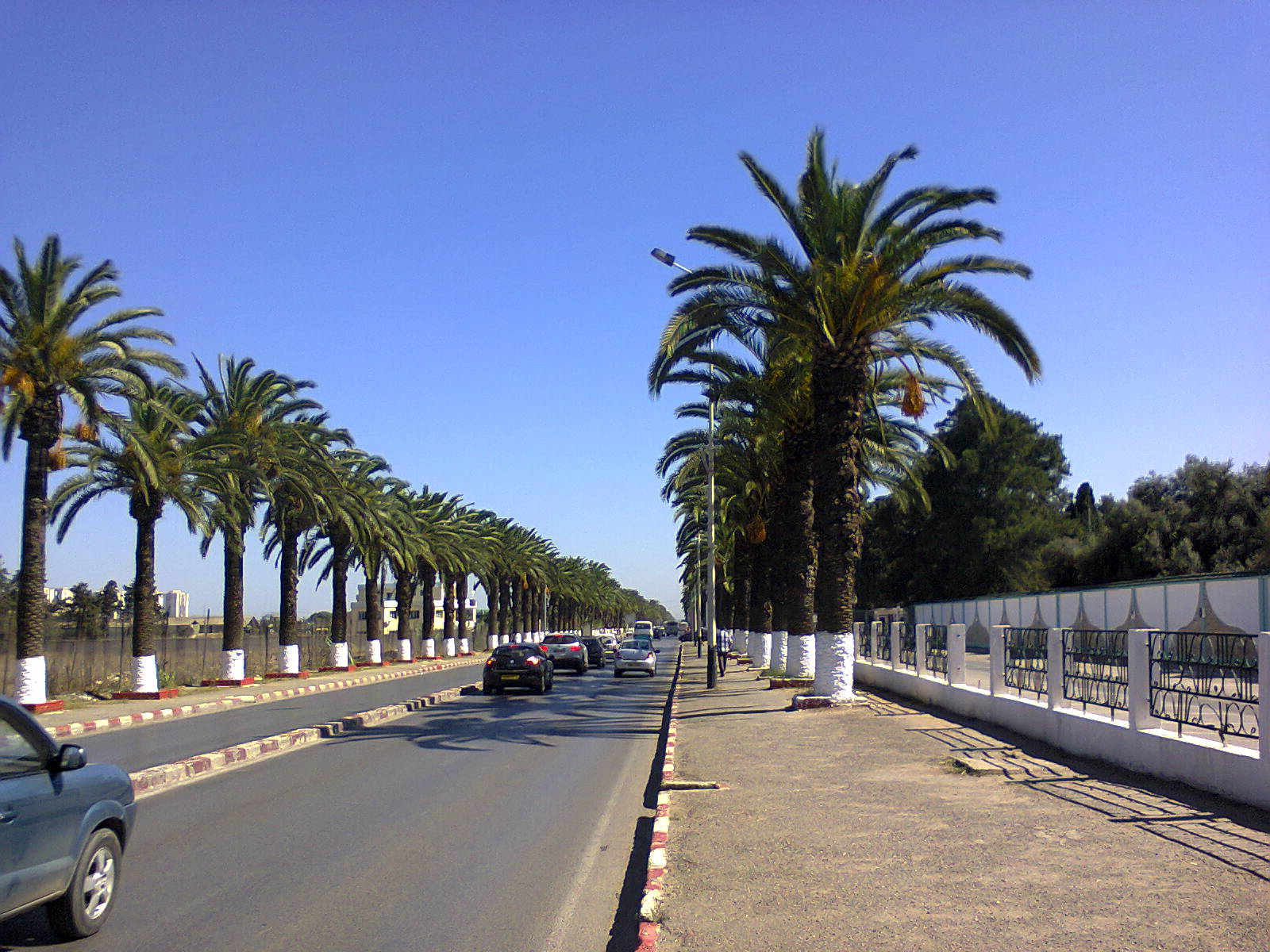
Bab Ezzouar

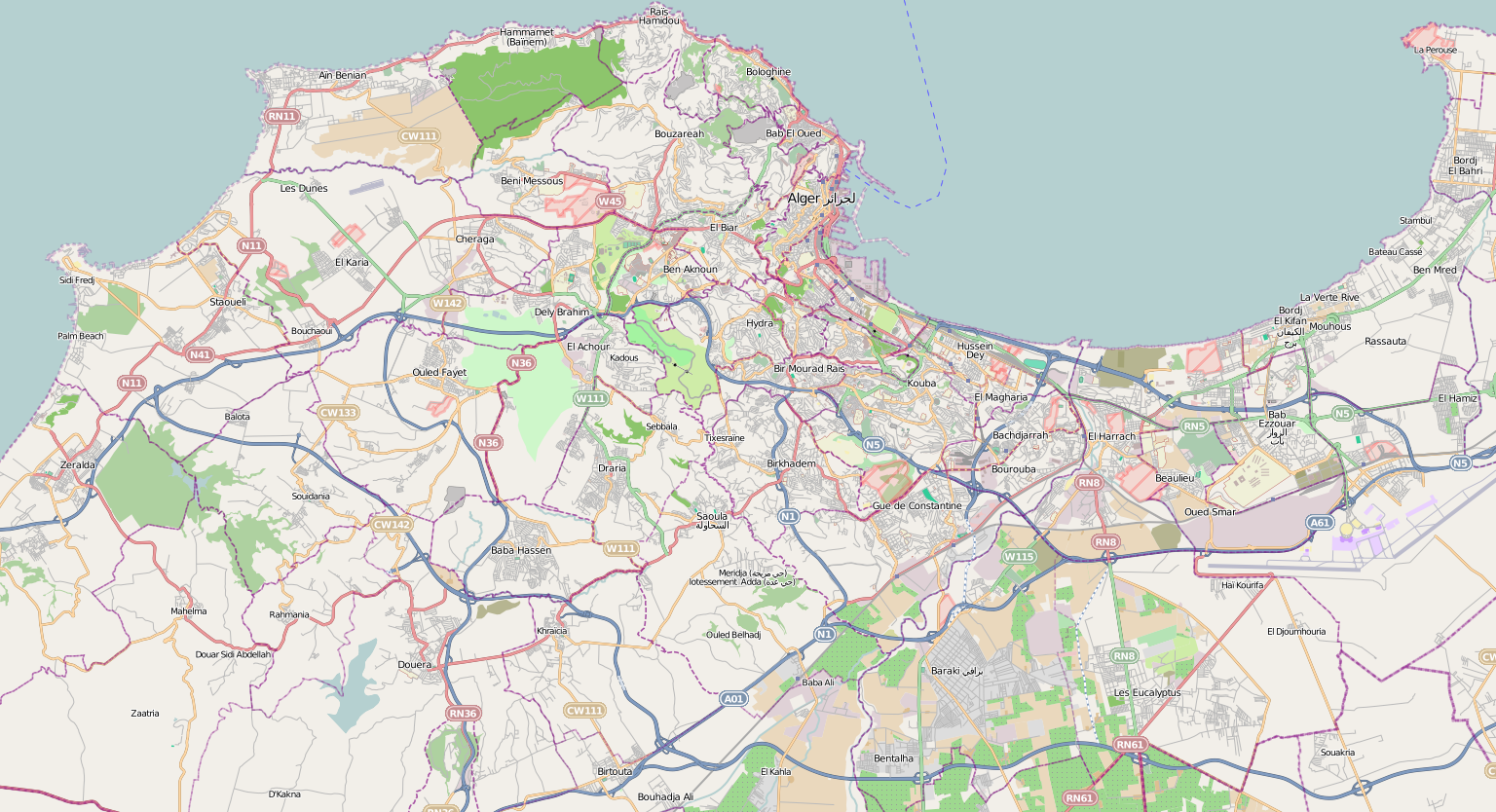
Algiers Province

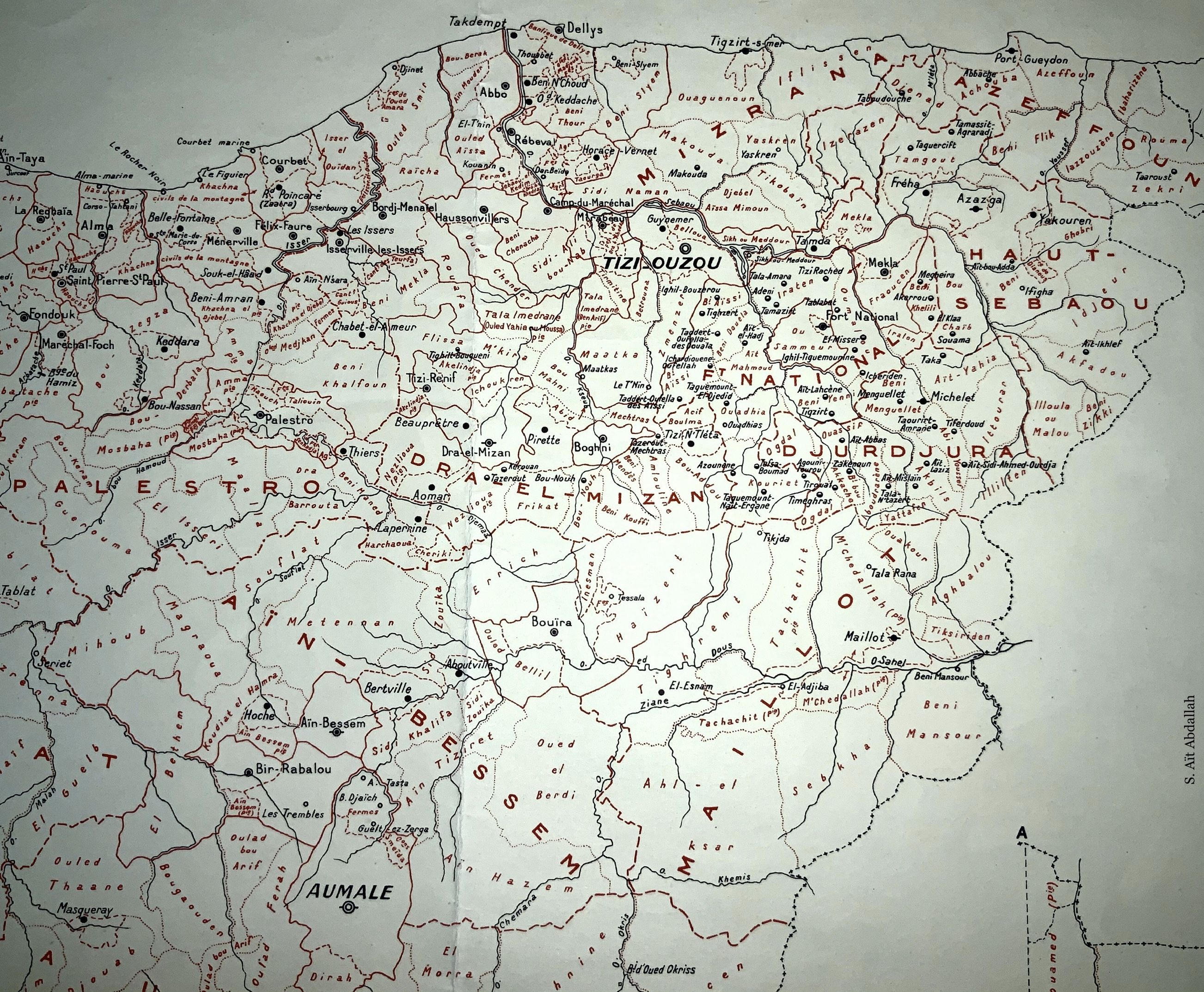
Kabylie tribes

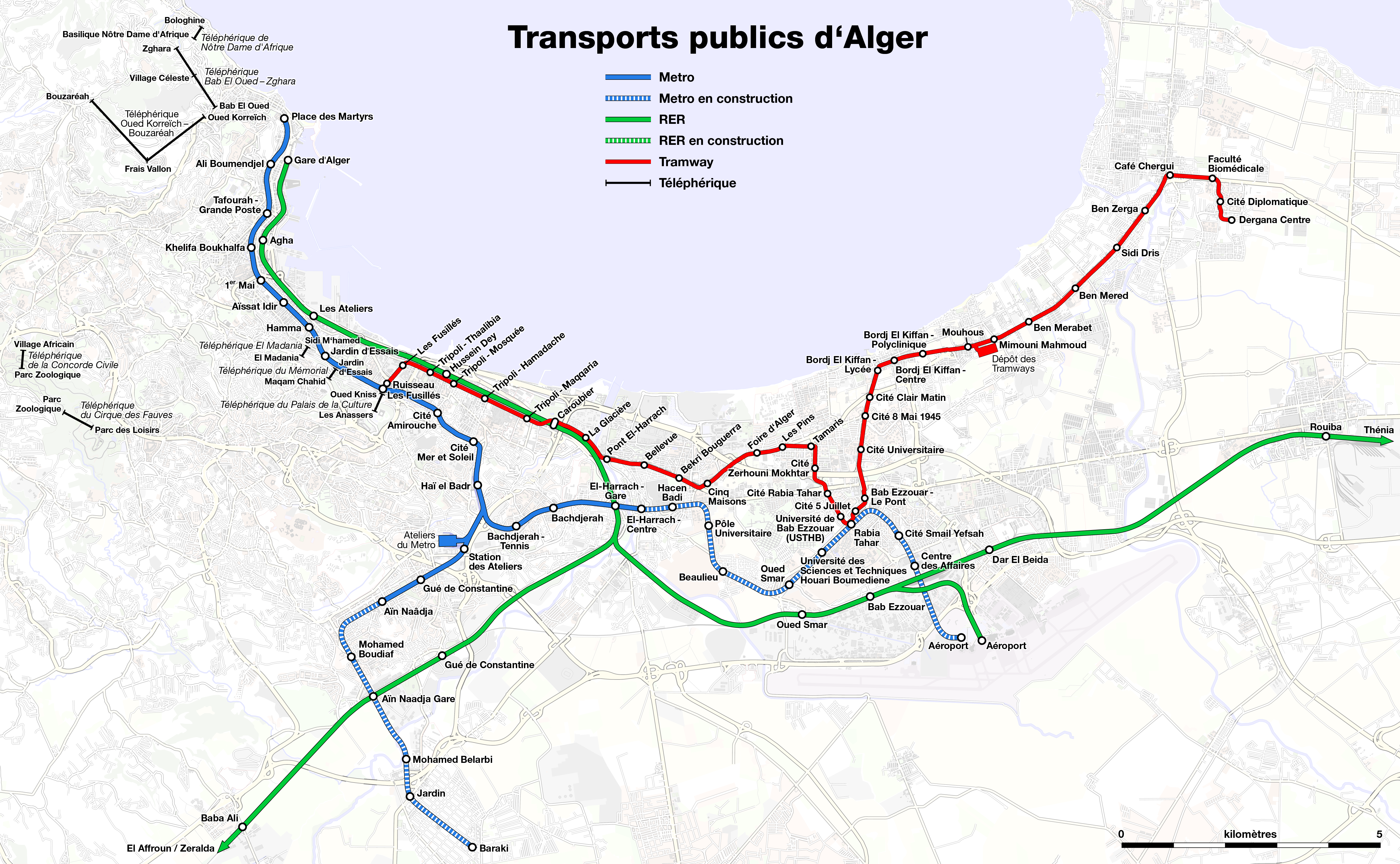
Algiers Metro & Algiers tramway

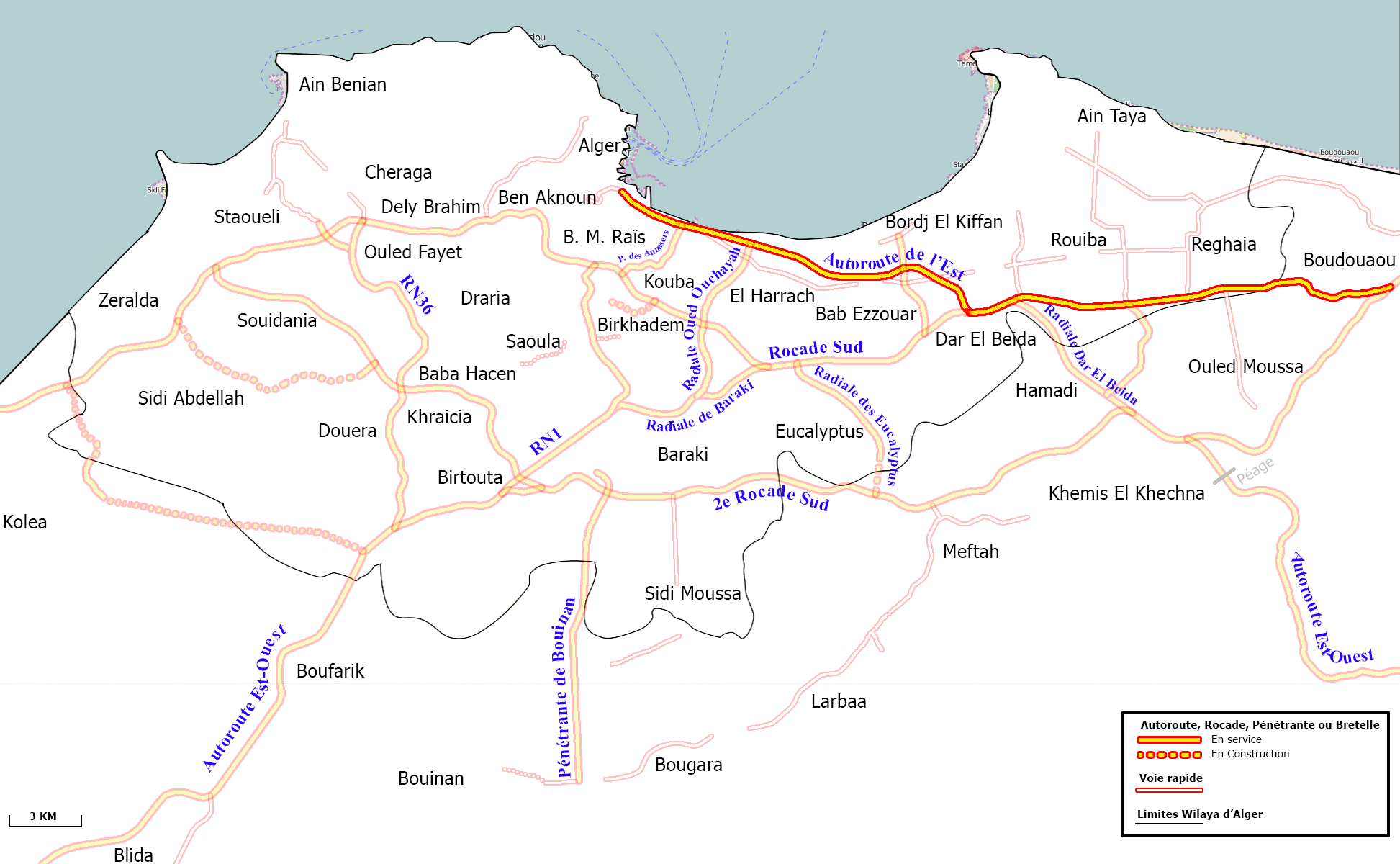
Transport in Algiers

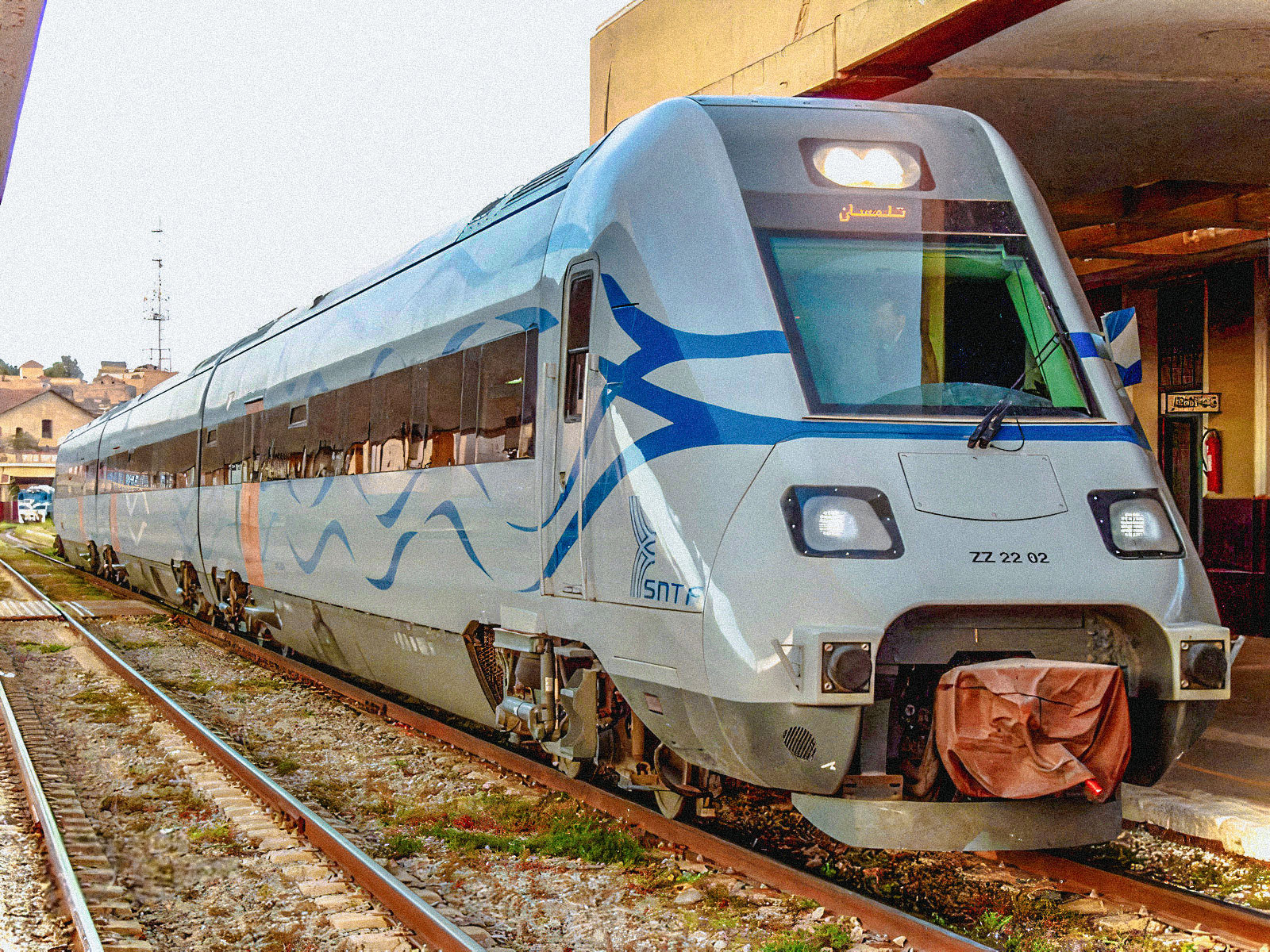
National Company for Rail Transport

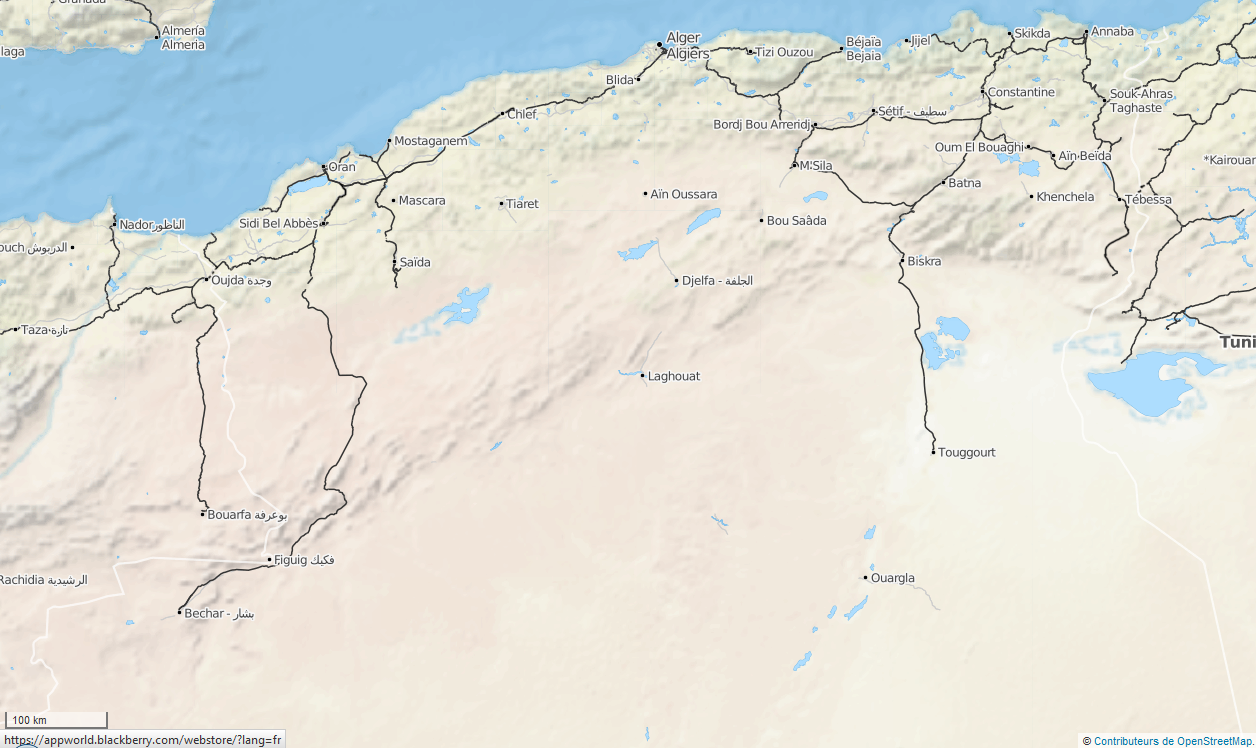
Railways Transport in Algeria

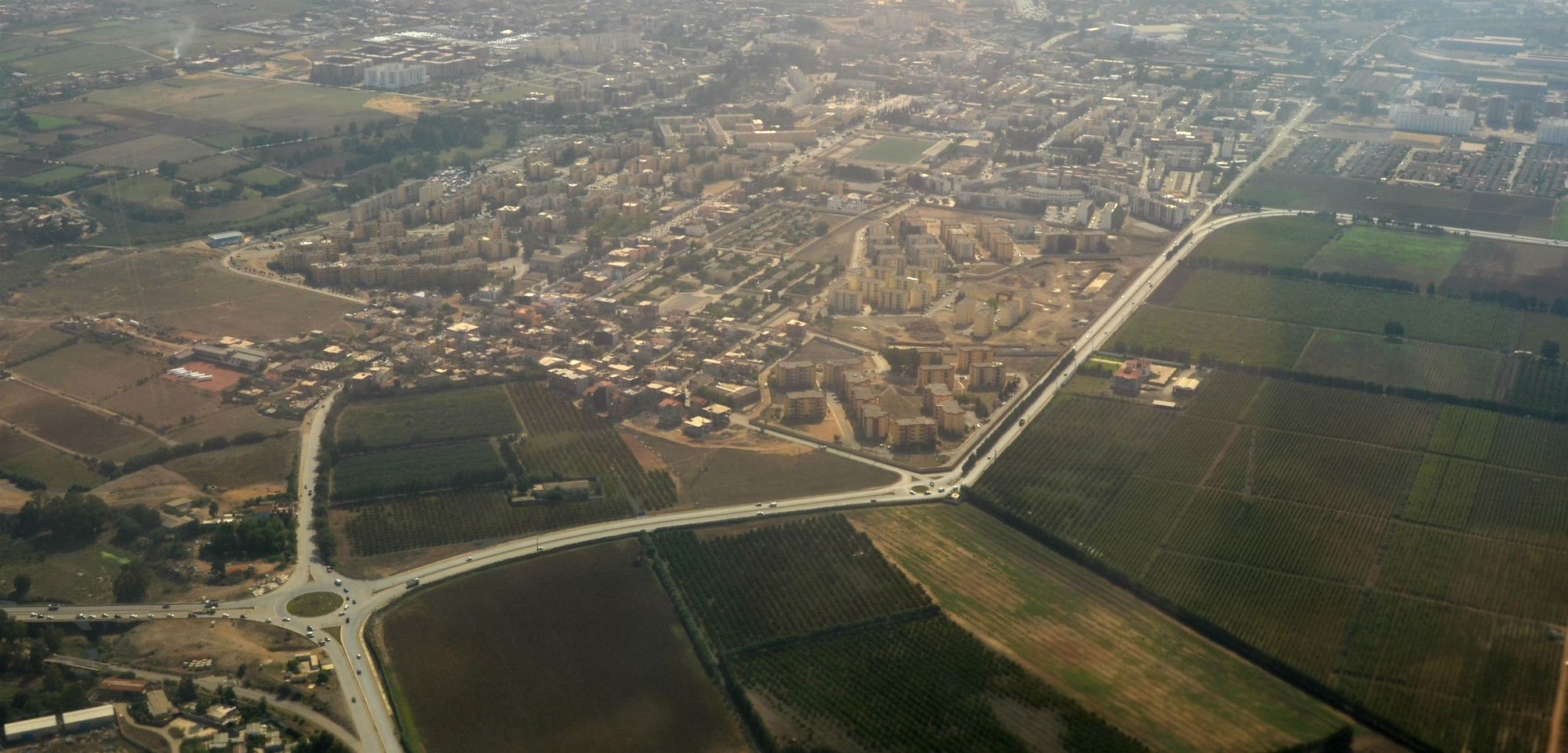
Route nationale 5

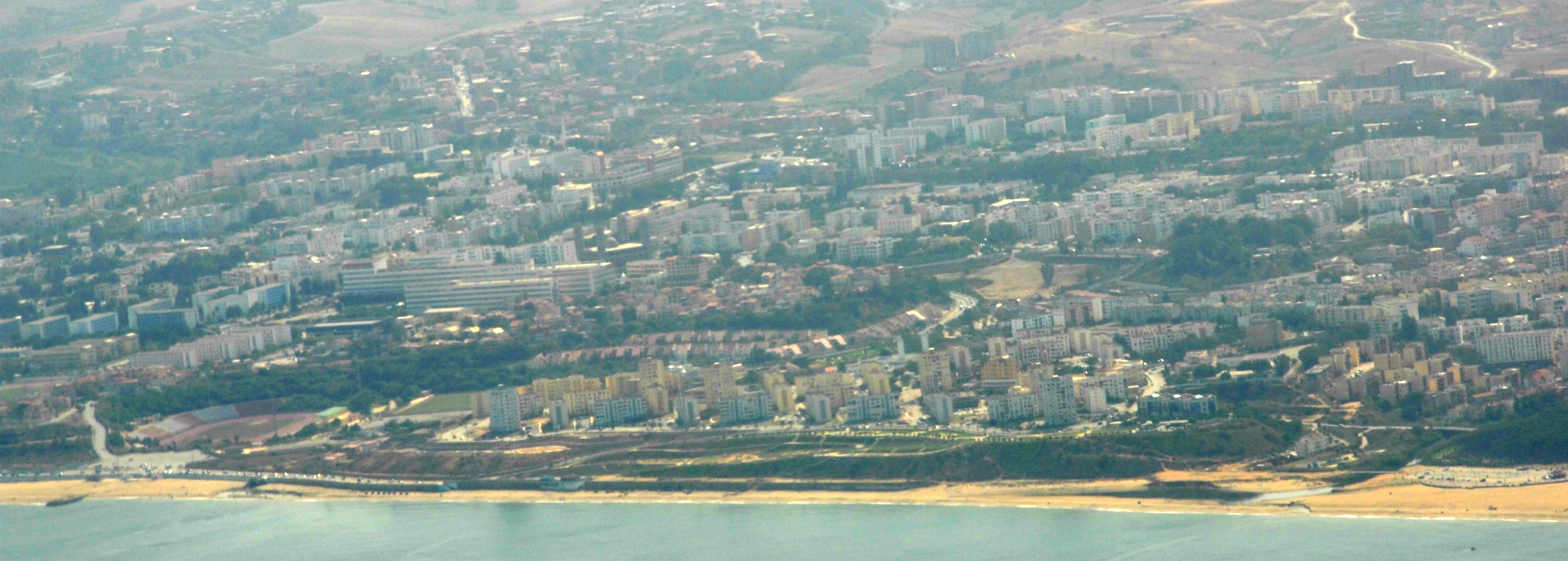
Route nationale 24

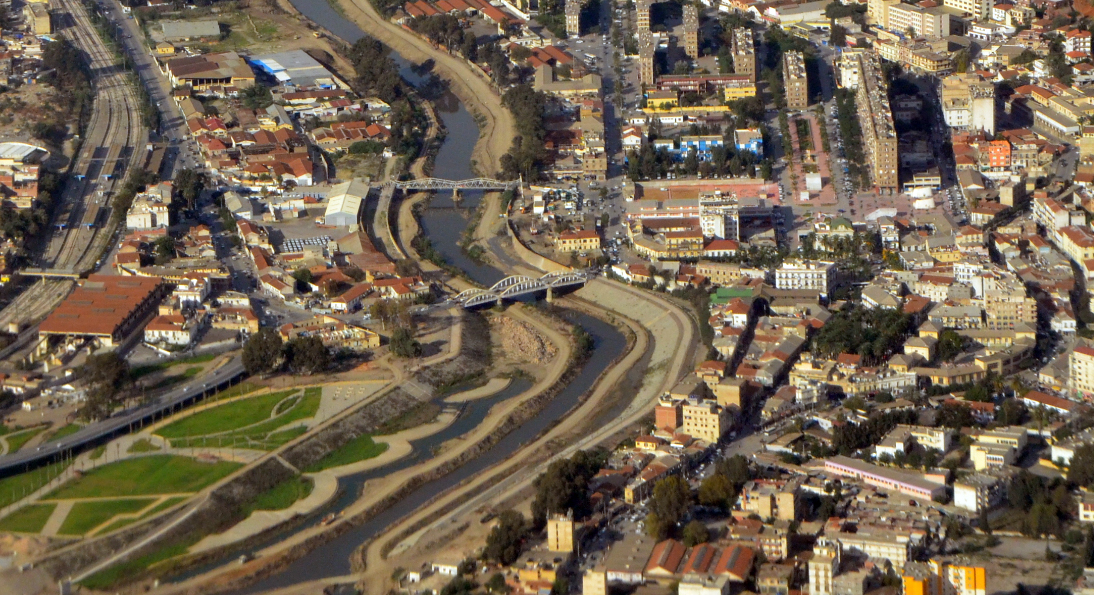
Oued El Harrach

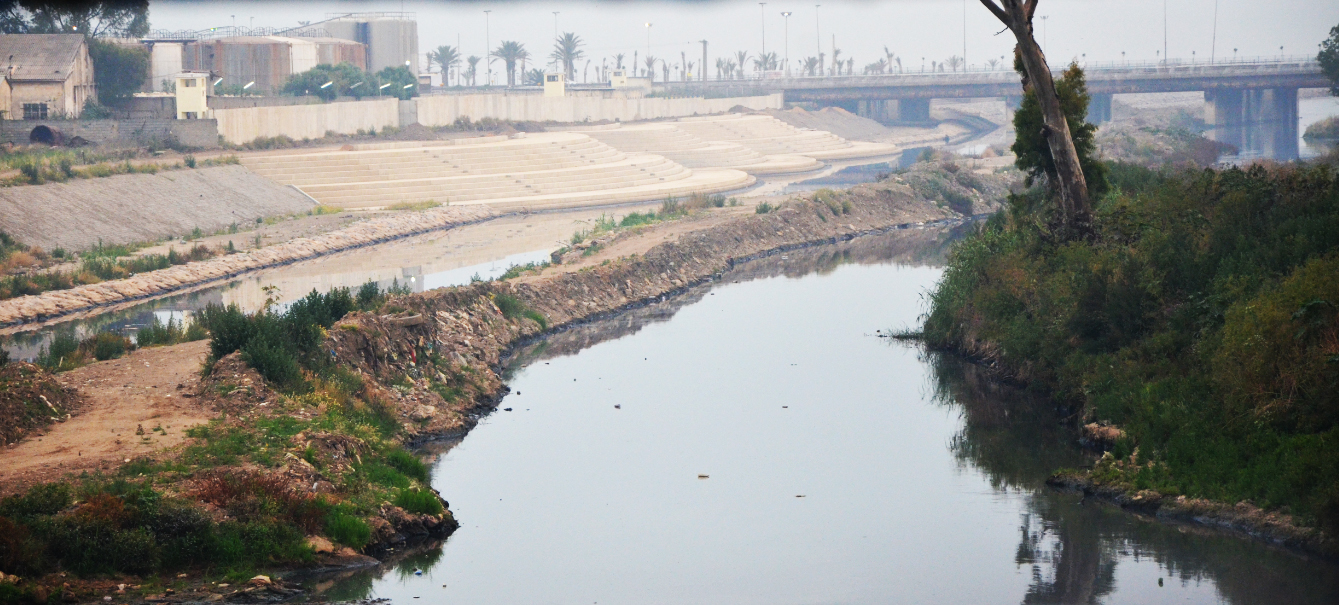
Oued El Harrach

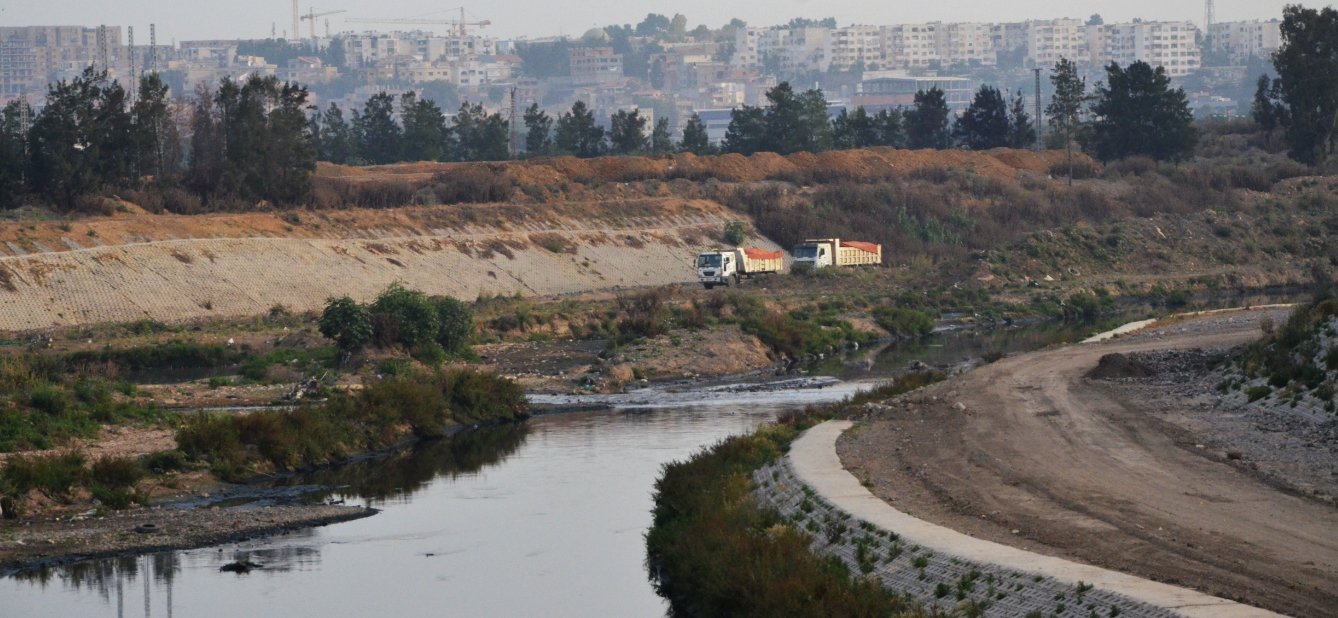
Oued El Harrach

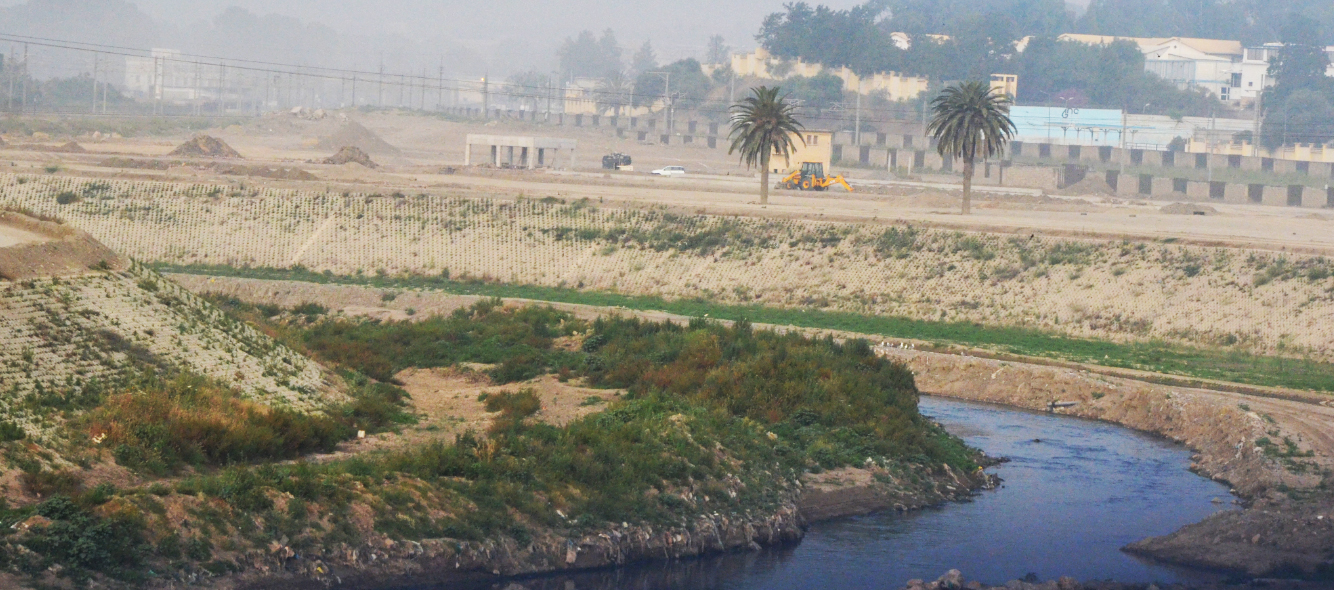
Oued El Harrach
