= Dar El Beïda District =

Coordinates: 36.714256°N 3.212385°E

Dar El Beïda District دائرة الدار البيضاء Daïra de Dar El Beïda
- District
- Map of Algeria highlighting Algiers Province

- Map of Algiers Province highlighting Dar El Beïda District
- Country: Algeria
- Province: Algiers
- District seat: Dar El Beïda

Population (1998)
  - Total: 348,883
- Time zone: UTC+01 (CET)
- District code: 12
- Municipalities: 7

Dar El Beïda is a district in Algiers Province, Algeria. It was named after its capital, Dar El Beïda.

== Municipalities ==
The district is further divided into 7 municipalities, which is the highest number in the province:

- Dar El Beïda
- Bab Ezzouar
- Aïn Taya
- El Marsa
- Bordj El Bahri
- Bordj El Kiffan
- Mohammedia

=== Transport ===
The district is served by the Algiers tramway which runs from the town to Bordj el Kiffan, including:

- Yahia Boushaki tram stop
