= Algérie Poste =

Algerian state-owned mail service company

- Native name: بريد الجزائر
- Company type: State-owned (government monopoly)
- Industry: Postal administration
- Founded: Algeria (1913)
- Headquarters: Algeria
- Products: First Class mail, Domestic Mail, Logistics
- Revenue: unknown
- Website: www.poste.dz

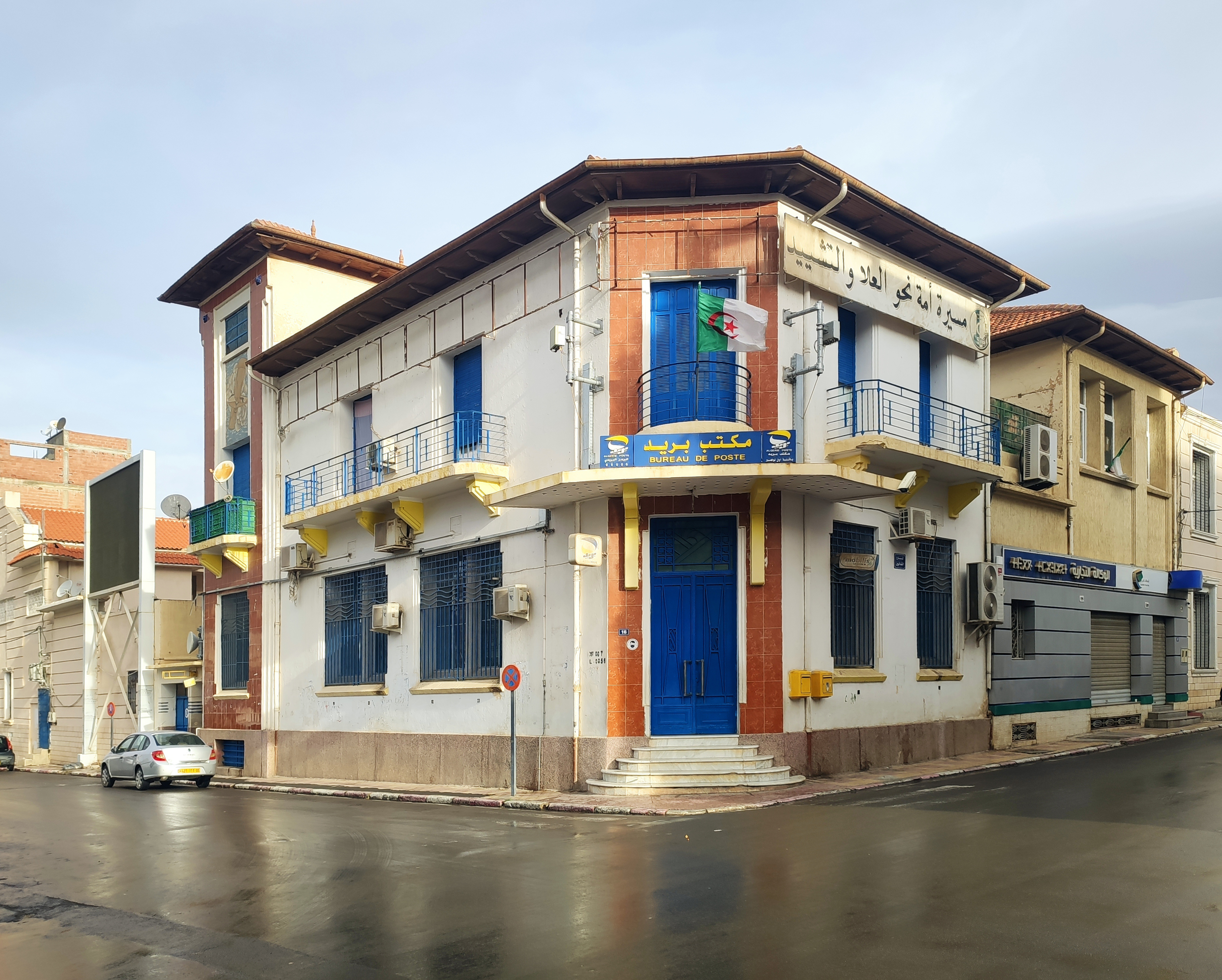
A former colonial post office in Batna, now run by Algérie Poste

Algérie Poste (French pronunciation: [alʒeʁi pɔst], "Algeria Post"; Arabic: بريد الجزائر, Brīd al-Jazāʾir) is the state-owned company responsible for postal service in Algeria. It is headquartered in Bab Ezzouar, Algiers.

== History ==
Algérie Poste was created in 2002 following the reorganization of the Postal, Telegraph, and Telephone Service (PTT). In 2007, it launched electronic payment with smart cards from HB Technologies.

On December 7, 2016, Algérie Poste launched the Edahabia card, which can be used to carry out all types of financial and commercial transactions via the Internet, withdraw cash from ATMs and pay for purchases in shops equipped with Eftpos terminals. The card is issued to CCP1 account holders.

On May 24, 2018, Algérie Poste is launching the first mobile post office for the month of Ramadan at the Promenade des Sablettes in Algiers. The mobile office is set up in an SNVI bus specially fitted out for Algérie Poste.

On September 30, 2018, launch of the Account-to-Account Transfer (V-CAC) via the automated teller machine (ATM), on all CCP accounts in real time, with a daily ceiling of 50,000 DA.

On October 20, 2018, Algérie Poste, in partnership with cell phone operator Djezzy, launched the Flexy electronic credit top-up service via ATMs and the internet.

In June 2019, Algérie Poste launches the instant money transfer service between private individuals. Hawalatic is a secure electronic money transfer service.

On December 4, 2019, Algérie Poste is launching the Cardless service, which allows users to withdraw money from its ATMs without having the card in hand, just thanks to the Baridimob app.

Since the beginning of 2020, it has been possible to use your Edahabia card at any ATM belonging to a public or private bank, which has just joined the Interbank System.

On March 21, 2021, the President of the Republic, Abdelmadjid Tebboune, ordered the closure of commercial accounts and a ban on opening them with Algérie Poste, with the exception of traders in the southern regions who have no bank branches.

== See also ==
- Communications in Algeria
- Postage stamps and postal history of Algeria
