= Bab Ezzouar =

Bab Ezzouar باب الزوار (in Arabic)
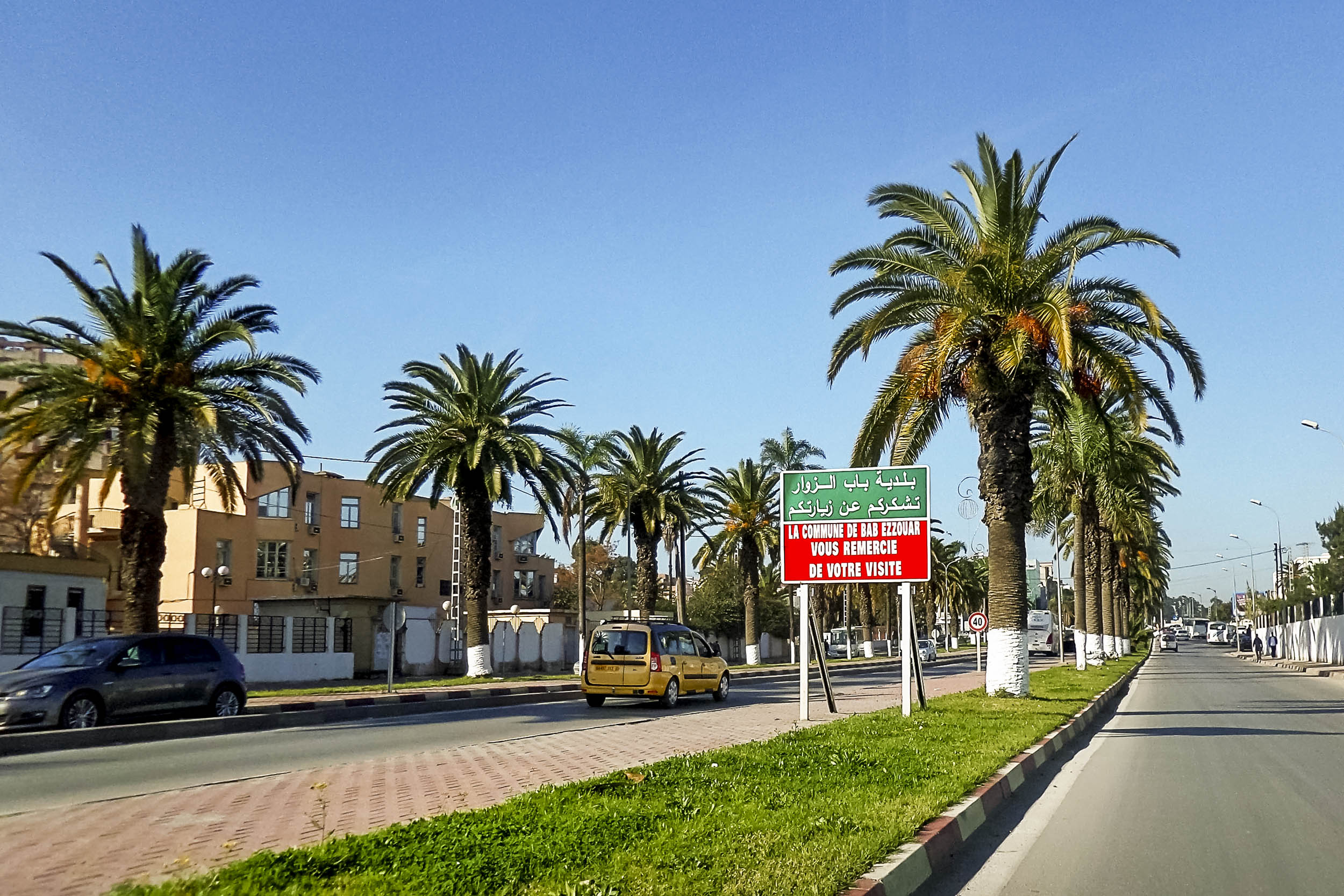

- Location within Algeria
- Coordinates: 36°43′18″N 3°11′07″E
- Country: Algeria
- Province: Algiers
- District: Dar El Beïda

Government
  - President of the APC: Mokhtar Bouchenba

Area
  - Total: 8.02 km^{2} (3.10 sq mi)
- Elevation: 19 m (62 ft)

Population (2008)
  - Total: 96,597
  - Density: 12,000/km^{2} (31,200/sq mi)
- Time zone: UTC+1 (CET)
- Postal code: 16311

Bab Ezzouar (/bɑːb ɛzwɑːr/; Arabic: باب الزوار) is a suburb of the city of Algiers in northern Algeria. It is one of Algiers fastest growing municipalities and has seen many hotels and commercial malls being raised in the area. Bab Ezzouar is also the location of the University of Science and Technology of Houari Boumediene (USTHB), which is one of the most prominent technological universities in Algeria.

== Geography ==
Bab Ezzouar is located some 12 km (7.5 mi) east by south-east of Algiers city just south of Bordj El Kiffan. Access to the commune is by the N11 highway from Algiers which passes through the north of the commune and continues east to join the A1 highway just east of the commune. Many other local roads connect the commune to the surrounding districts. The commune is fully urban in nature.

=== Transport ===
The commune is served by the Algiers tramway which runs from the town to Bordj el Kiffan, including:

- Yahia Boushaki tram stop
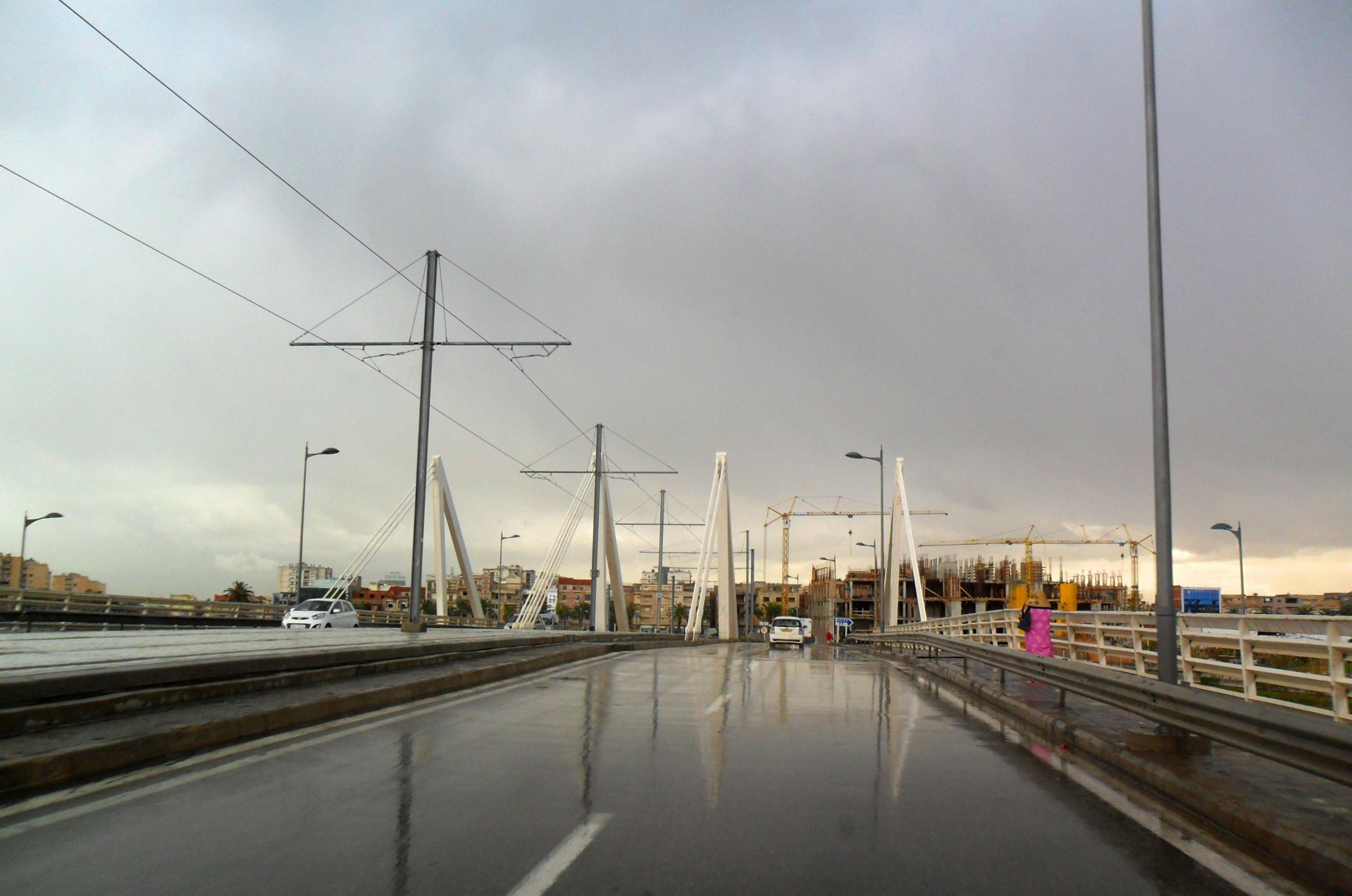
Bridges connecting Bab Ezzouar and El Mohammedia (Zerhouni Mokhtar neighborhood).

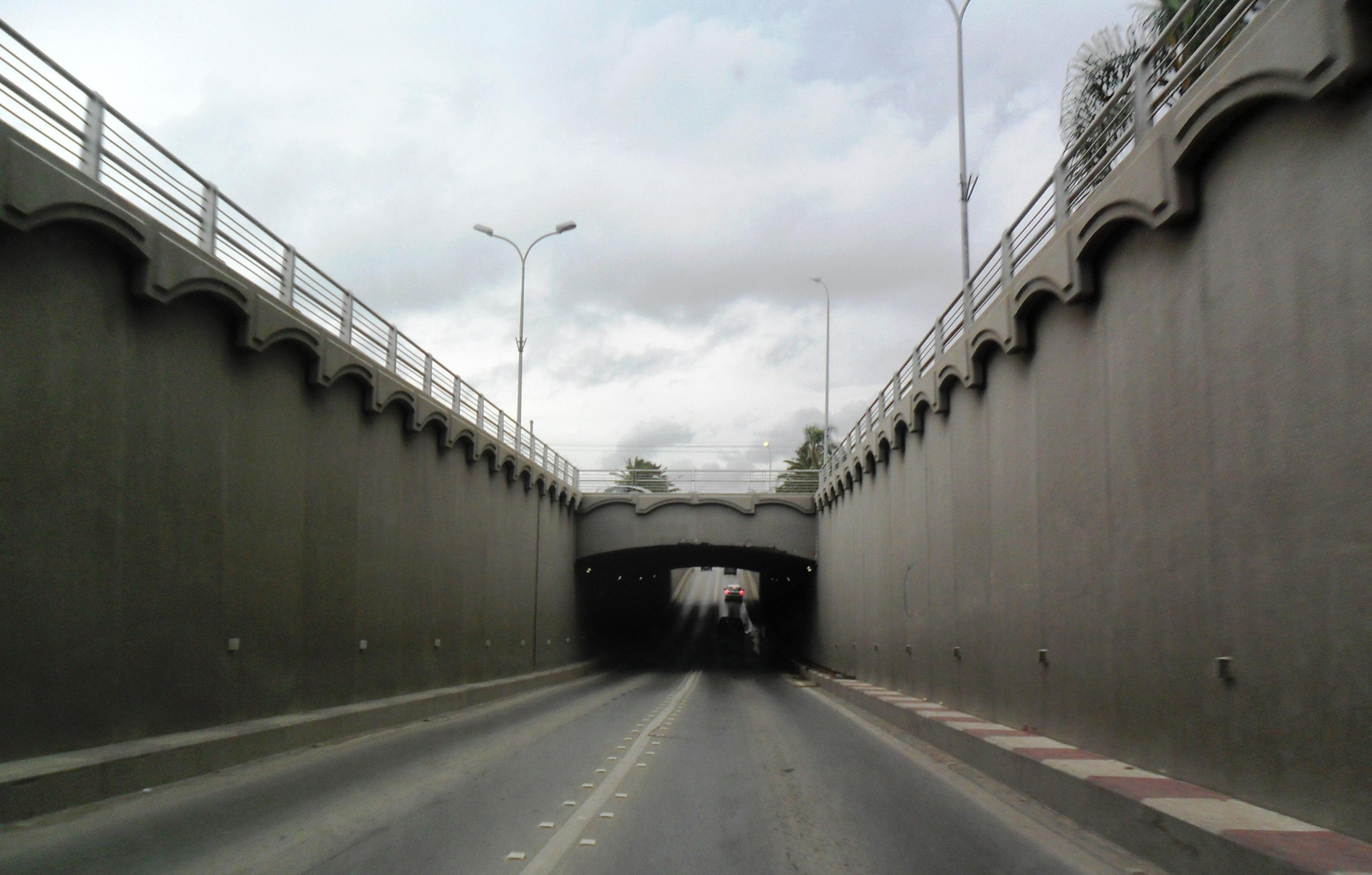
Underpass at the Souk El Fellah intersection, looking towards the Bab Ezzouar bridge from El Alia.

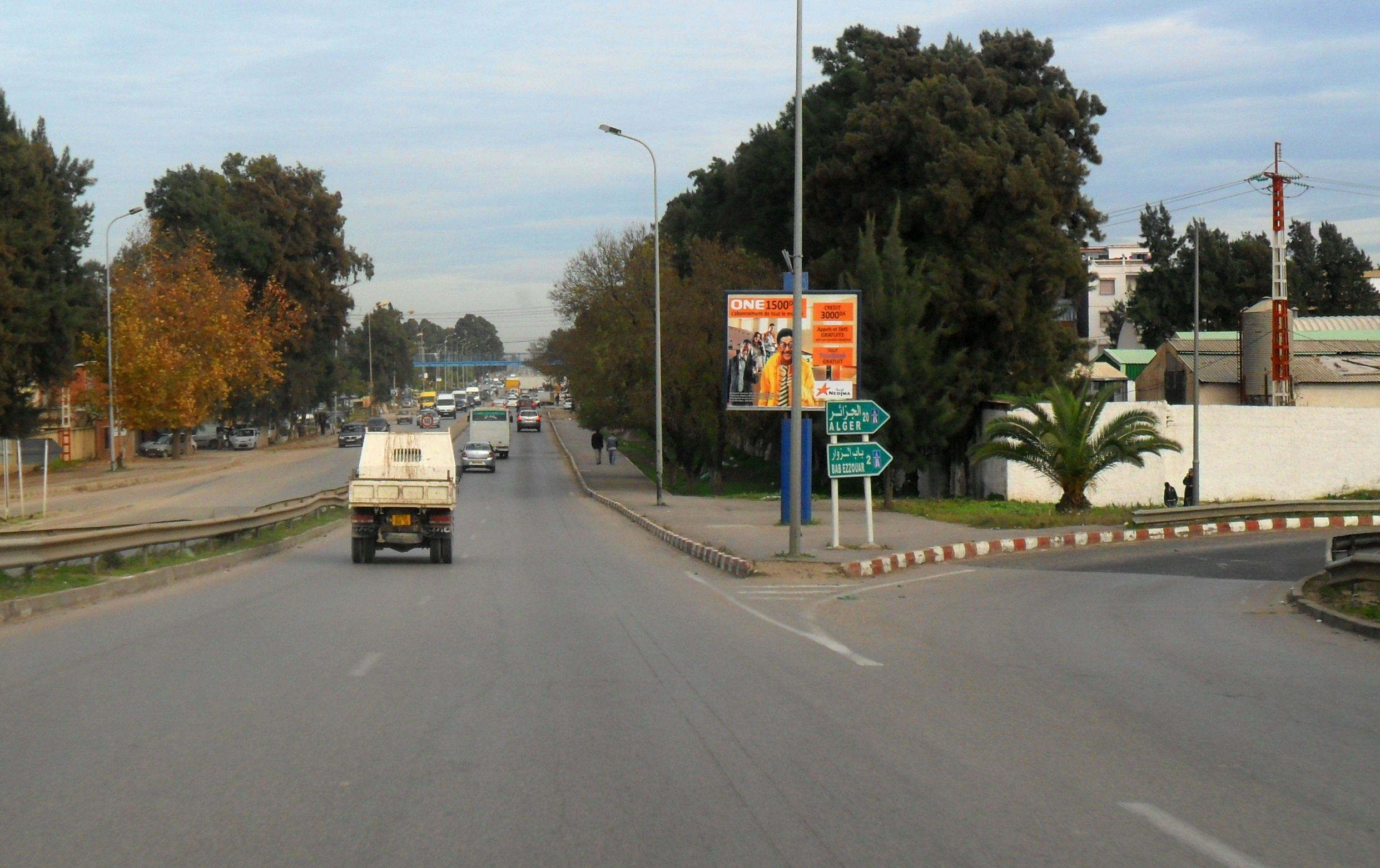
The RN5 highway heading toward El Hamiz and Rouïba at the eastern exit of Bab Ezzouar.

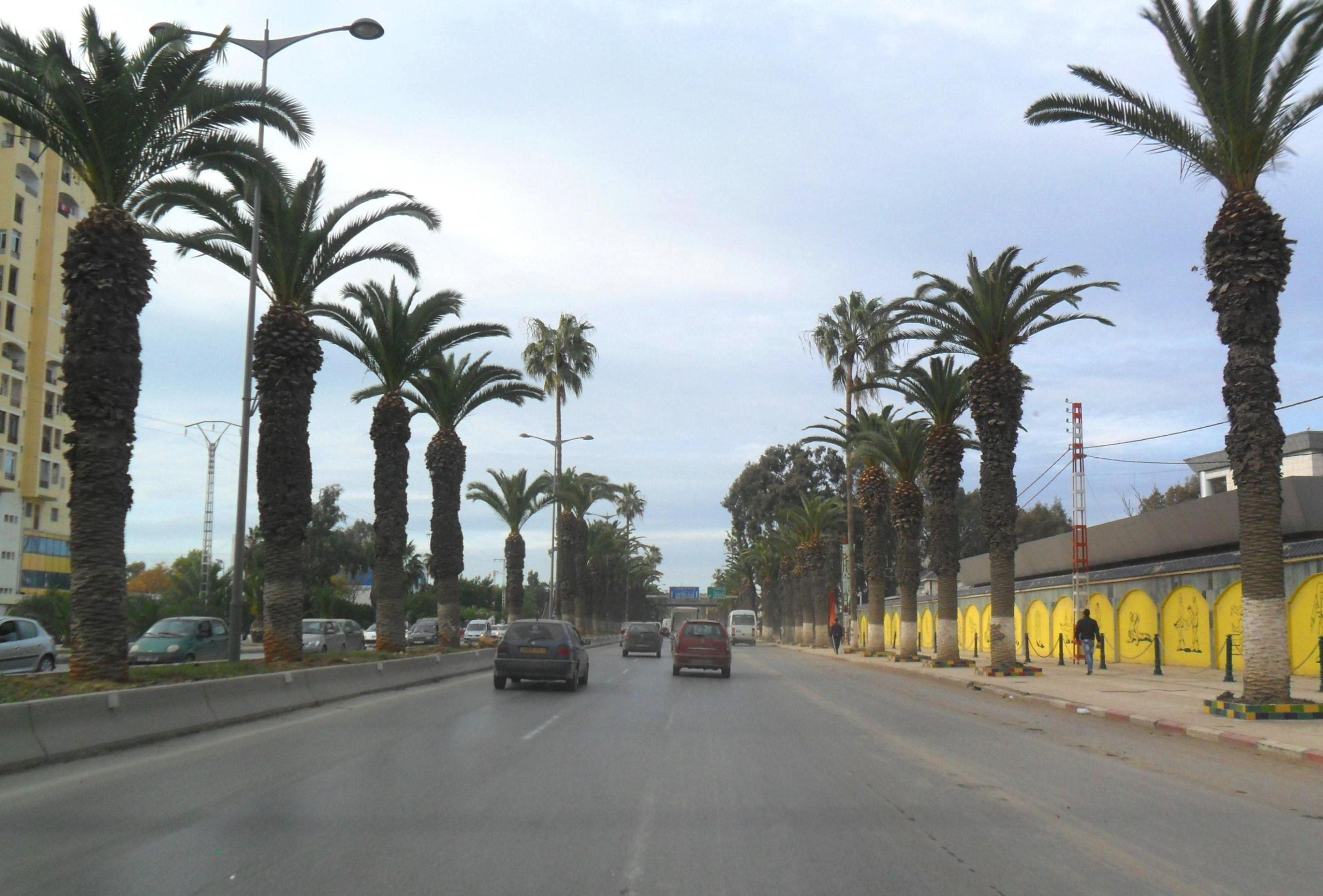
The airport access road, forming the border between Bab Ezzouar (left) and Dar El Beïda (right).

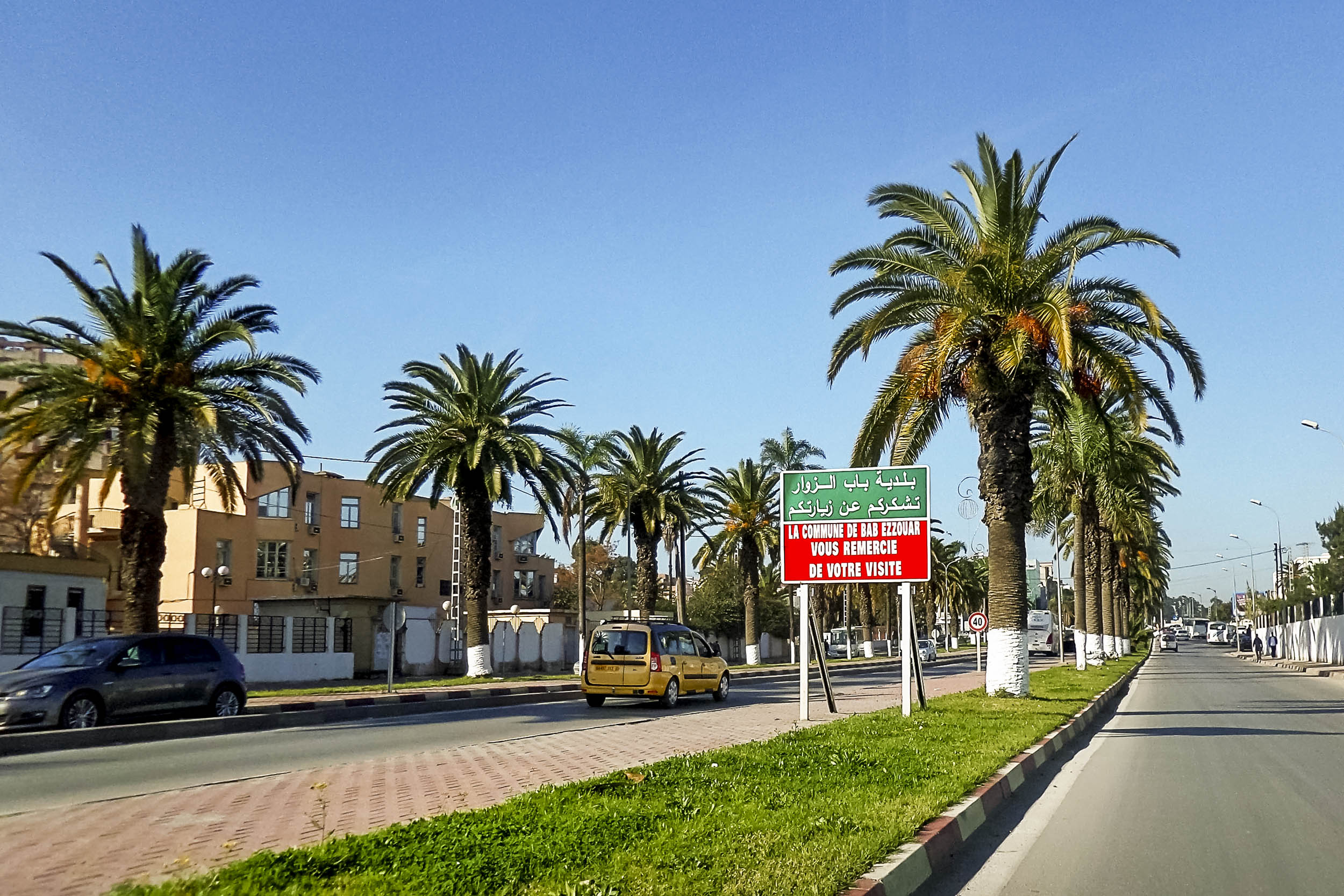
Western exit heading toward the Souk El Fellah intersection and Alger Centre.

== Urbanism ==
Bab Ezzouar is a city made up of Commuter towns built successively since the late 1970s on an ancient marshy plain with unplanned subdivisions emerging since the 1990s. It has no real downtown although it hosts several administrations.

The commune consists of 8 cities which are:

- The Cité Ismail Yefsah (2068 dwellings) located in the centre
- The Cité Soummam located in the centre and the north-east.
- The Cité du 8 Mai 1945 (Sorécal) located to the north of the Algiers northern bypass road (the N11)
- The Cité du 5 Juillet 1962 to the south
- The Cité Tahar Rabia
- The Cité Kourifa Rachid
- The Cité El Djorf to the west
- The Cité des 498 logements
- The Cité EPLF (1080 dwellings)
- The Cité 1200 logements
- The Cité de la concorde civile (AADL 1)
- The Cité AADL 2

Also several Housing Estates:

- Boushaki Housing Estates 1 to 5
- Douzi Housing Estates 1 to 4

== History ==
The area was known as Retour de la Chasse (Return from Hunting) during French colonial times. At that time there were two hamlets: one French, along the old national road to Algiers airport, and another named Sid M'hamed off the motorway behind the current Cité du 8 Mai 1945.

The commune results from the administrative division of 1984. Beginning in 2001, the state has constructed several neighborhoods consisting of 22-story residential buildings.

== Amenities ==
At the heart of the commune is the University of Sciences and Technology Houari Boumediene (USTHB) Algiers that has 27,000 students, as well as the National Veterinary College (ENSV), and three other university campuses.

The commune has three schools:

- The Lebdjaoui Mohamed School
- The El Djorf School
- The Mostapha Lachraf School

A new business district is in the process of construction in the south-east of the commune. It includes an Hotel Mercure and Ibis and has offices for Mobilis, Algérie Poste, CMA CGM, and Air Algerie in the shopping centre.

A shopping centre of 45,000 m^{2} (480,000 sq ft) which extends over three floors plus two office towers of 20,000 m^{2} (220,000 sq ft).

Algérie Poste is headquartered in Bab Ezzouar. Ooredoo's operations in Algeria are based in the town, near the Mercer Hotel.

== Notable people ==
- Ismail Yafsah lived in the commune and was assassinated in the city that bears his name: Ismail Yafsah.
- Zaho, singer, was born and raised in the commune - specifically in Cité Tahar Rabia building No. 13.
- Rafik Saifi, footballer, was born and raised in the commune - specifically in the Cité du 8 Mai 1945 building No. 5.

== See also ==
- University of Sciences and Technology Houari Boumediene
- Bab Ezzouar Shopping Mall

=== External links ===
- Plan of Bab Ezzouar (in French)
- USTHB website
- Bab Ezzouar on Google Maps
