= Algiers tramway =

Tram network serving Algiers, Algeria since 2011

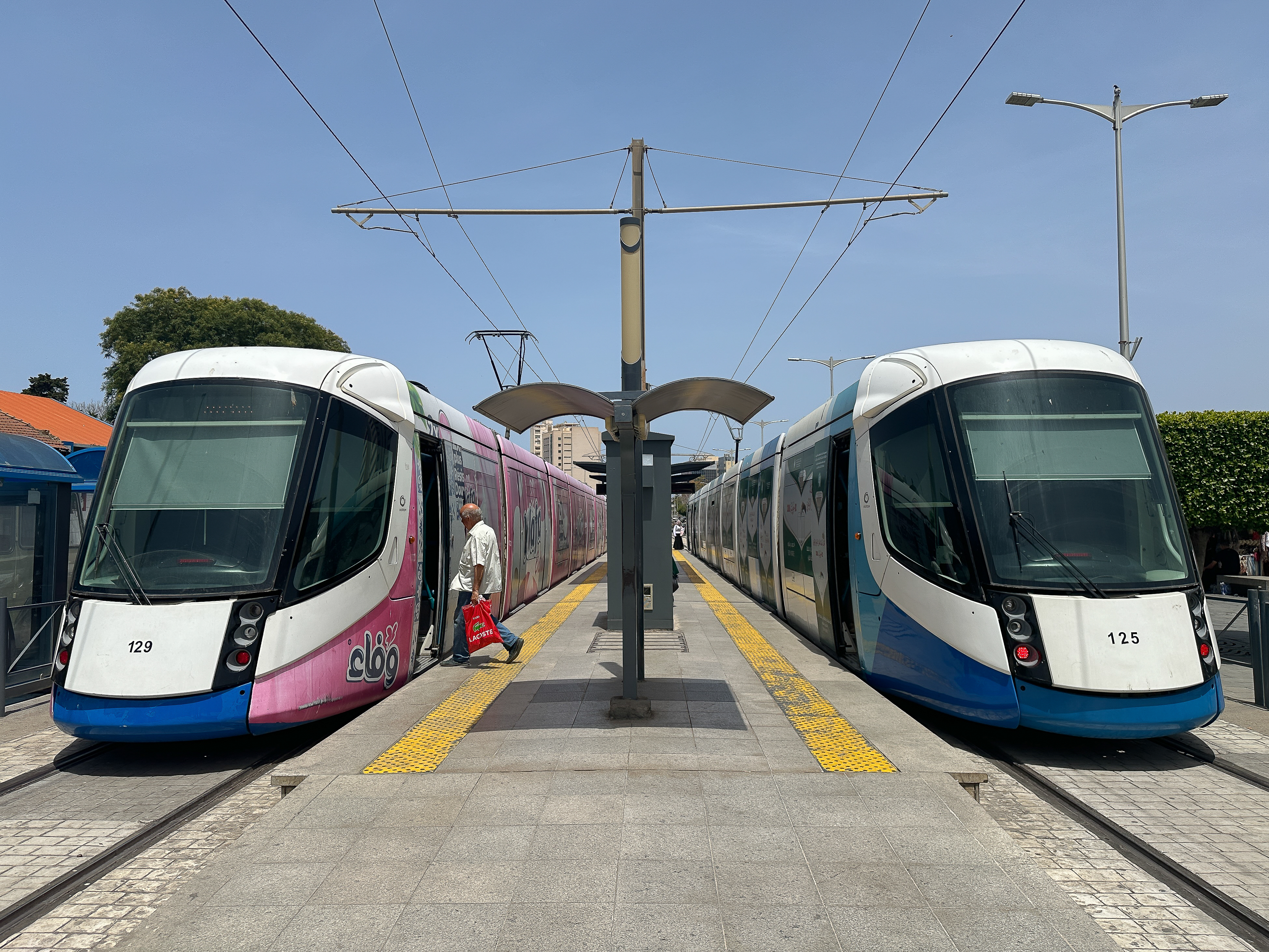
- Trams #129 and #125, both Alstom Citadis 402s, at Ruisseau station, June 2026

Overview
- Native name: ترامواي الجزائر
- Owner: Entreprise Métro d'Alger (EMA)
- Locale: Algiers, Algeria
- Transit type: Tram
- Number of lines: 1
- Number of stations: 37
- Website: https://setram.dz/nos-reseaux/ALG

Operation
- Began operation: 8 May 2011
- Operator: SETRAM
- Rolling stock: 48 Alstom Citadis

Technical
- System length: 23.2 km (14.4 mi)
- Track gauge: 1,435 mm (4 ft 8 1/2 in) standard gauge
System map

The Algiers tramway (Arabic: ترامواي الجزائر, lit. 'Algiers Tramway') is a tram system serving Algiers, the capital and largest city of Algeria. Opened in 2011, the network is operated by the Société d'exploitation des tramways (SETRAM) and owned by the Entreprise Métro d'Alger (EMA). The 23 km (14 mi) long network consists of one line, and serves 37 stations.

Although Algiers had a network of electric trams from the late 19th to the mid-20th century, the current network mostly runs on a different route and alignment to that of the original lines. Planning for the new tramway started in 2002, with construction being started in early 2007. The network opened on 8 May 2011, and was subsequently extended three times: in 2012, 2014, and 2015.

== History ==
=== Original network (1898-1959) ===
As the capital of Algeria, Algiers has historically had some of the best transport infrastructure in the country. During the course of France's colonisation of Algeria, Algiers possessed a large tram network which lasted from the end of the 19th century until just before Algeria's independence.

From 1898, three different companies operated trams in and around the city on their own independent networks, without any integration with each other, however with the same technical characteristics: a track gauge of 1055 mm, and a 600 V DC electrification system.

==== CFRA network ====
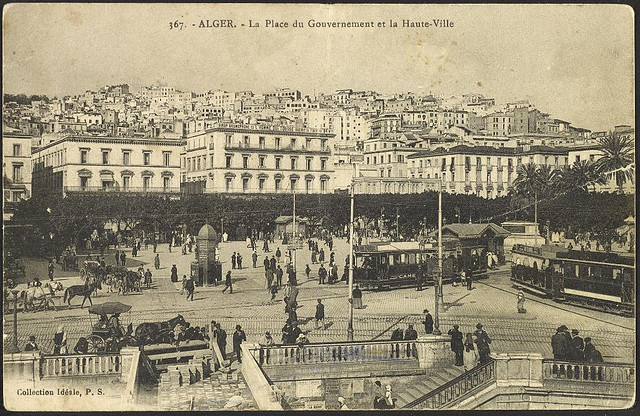
CFRA trams at the Place du Gouvernement in the early 1900s.

The largest network was that of the Chemins de fer sur routes d'Algérie, or the CFRA. Starting in 1898, the company decided to electrify the central part of its steam-hauled local and interurban rail network for around 17 kilometres (11 mi) from Maison-Carrée (now El Harrach) to Deux-Moulins in the area of Saint-Eugene (now Bologhine) via the city centre and the Place du Gouvernement (now the Place des Martyrs). While doing this, the company also rerouted the steam-hauled line to run via Algiers' coastal boulevards instead of on inner-city streets, with the new route paralleling the standard-gauge intercity mainline out of Algiers station and running north under Bab-el-Oued in a tunnel until it met with the electric tramline at its terminus in Deux-Moulins. The second electrified line of the network, which branched off of the first line at the Champ de Manœuvres and ran for 6 kilometres (3.7 mi) south to Kouba via Ruisseau and Belcourt (now Hussein Dey), opened in 1905, bringing the total length of the CFRA network to its all-time high of 23 kilometres (14 mi).

By the end of the Second World War, however, the network was falling out of favour with many local residents, who saw the trams as a detriment to car traffic. As a result, several tram lines were closed and subsequently replaced with trolleybuses, with the Ruisseau-Kouba part of the Champ de Manœuvres-Kouba line being the first to be closed in 1945. The last trams ran on the CFRA network from Nelson (near Bab-el-Oued) to Ruisseau on May 21, 1957.

==== TMS network ====
The second network of trams was operated by the Tramways et Messageries du Sahel, or the TMS. The TMS operated a single 6.4 km (4.0 mi) long line which started at the Place du Gouvernement in the city centre and ran east to Ben Aknoun via El Biar and Châteauneuf, and opened in 1904. The line encountered grades exceeding 60% and had an extremely windy route with several hairpin bends. Although the line enjoyed relative popularity when it opened, in 1935 a bus service was launched from the city centre to El Biar on a longer, but less steep, route that quickly began to attract passengers from the TMS tramline. As a result, the TMS was in disarray and was bought out by the departmental authorities of Algiers, who later entrusted ownership of the tramway to the CFRA in January 1937. The line was fully closed and replaced by trolleybuses in 1939.

==== TA network ====
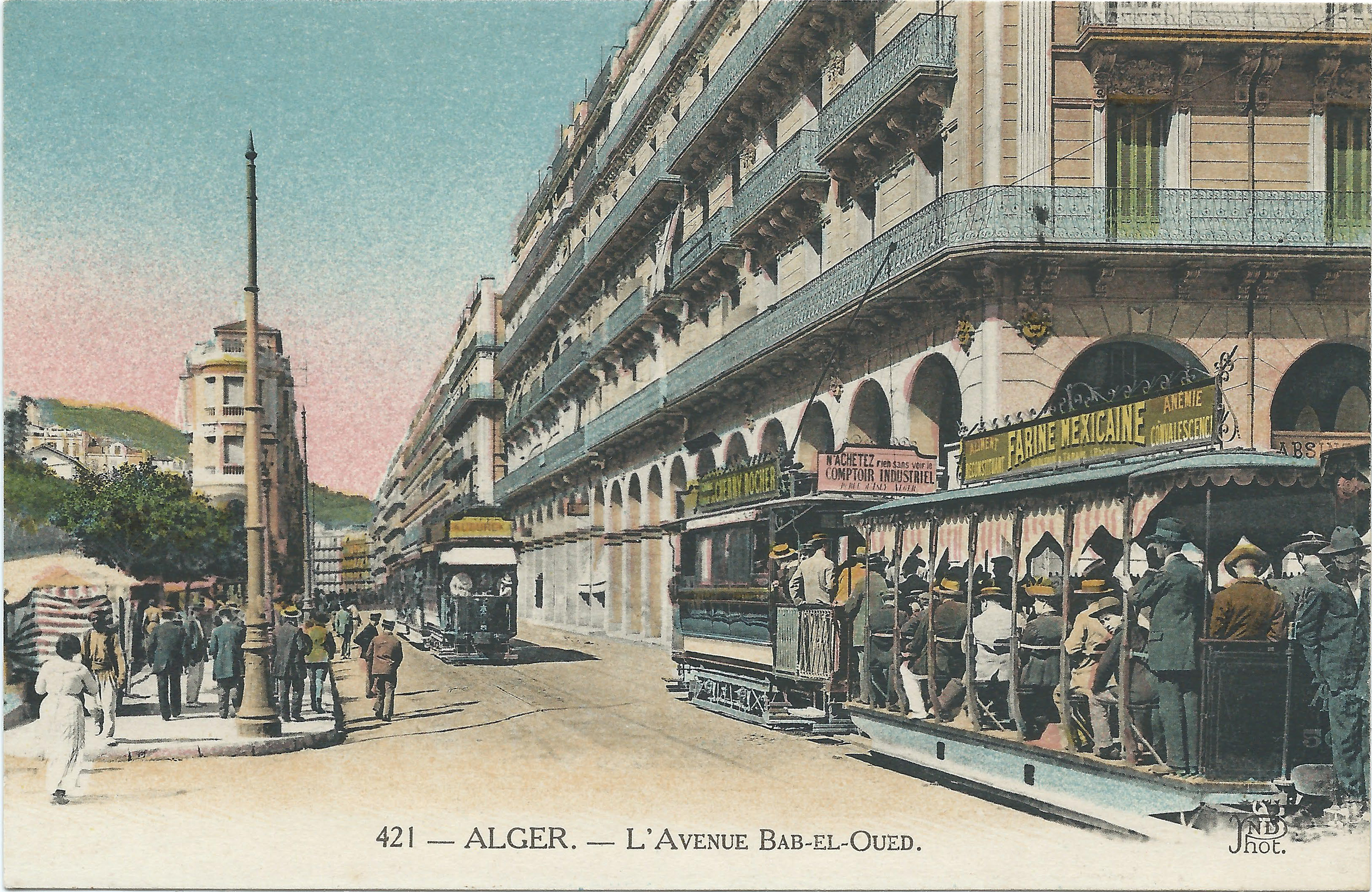
A pre-World War 1 postcard of TA trams on the Bab-el-Oued avenue.

The third network was operated by the Société des tramways algériens (TA), a company which was a subsidiary of the Thomson-Houston enterprise that also operated several tram networks in mainland France. The TA network consisted of one line with two branches that ran between the Hôpital du Dey, in Bab-el-Oued, south to Yusuf via the Place du Gouvernement. At Yusuf, the network branched off with a line running east to the Colonne Voirol and another running west to the Boulevard Bru. The network, in its totality, measured 14 kilometres (8.7 mi) in length. The first section of the line, from the Hôpital du Dey to the Colonne Voirol, was put into service on April 14, 1898, while the branch to the Boulevard Bru began regular service in 1900. By the start of the Second World War, the TA had become one of the most modern tram systems in French territory, however its success would be short-lived, mostly due to the introduction of trolleybuses on the tramway's route. On April 8, 1940, the Boulevard Bru branch would be closed and replaced by trolleybuses running from the boulevard to the Grande Poste, while on April 26, 1941, the line to the Colonne Voirol was also replaced by trolleybuses, thus reducing the TA network to a single line running from the Hôpital du Dey to Yusuf.

Like with the CFRA trams, the continued existence of the remaining TA line after the Second World War was heavily criticized by both city authorities and local motorists due to the trams clashing with car traffic. As such, the final trams ran on the TA network, and in the city of Algiers as a whole, on September 12, 1959.

=== Modern network ===
==== 2002-2011: Initial planning and construction ====
Plans to return trams to Algiers in a modern form were first introduced by the Algerian government in 2002, as part of an economic recovery package. Feasibility studies for the new project were carried out by the French companies Semaly (now Egis Rail) and Ingérop, with two lines being planned: an eastern line from Ruisseau in the city centre to Bordj El Kiffan, and a western line from the city centre to Bab-el-Oued and Aïn Bénian. Of the two lines, the eastern line was given the highest priority. On December 22, 2005, the déclaration d'utilité publique of the tramway was officially approved.

In February 2006, the Entreprise Métro d'Alger (EMA) awarded the contract for project and construction management of the eastern line to a consortium of Systra and RATP Dev. Later, in June 2006, the EMA awarded the contract for construction of the tramway to the Mediterrail consortium of Alstom, Todini, and ETRHB Haddad. Civil engineering works on the tramway would be carried out by Todini and ETRHB Haddad, while Alstom would supply the tram vehicles, the signalling system, and would carry out the laying of track as a turnkey project.

Construction on the line began in March 2007, and the line was planned to open in 2009. However, over the course of construction, several problems arose concerning both land compensation for local residents, and the rerouting (and in some cases complete renewal) of utility networks such as those of water and electricity that lay along the route. As a result of these problems, commissioning of the tramway was delayed several times.

Construction of the tramway in August 2008

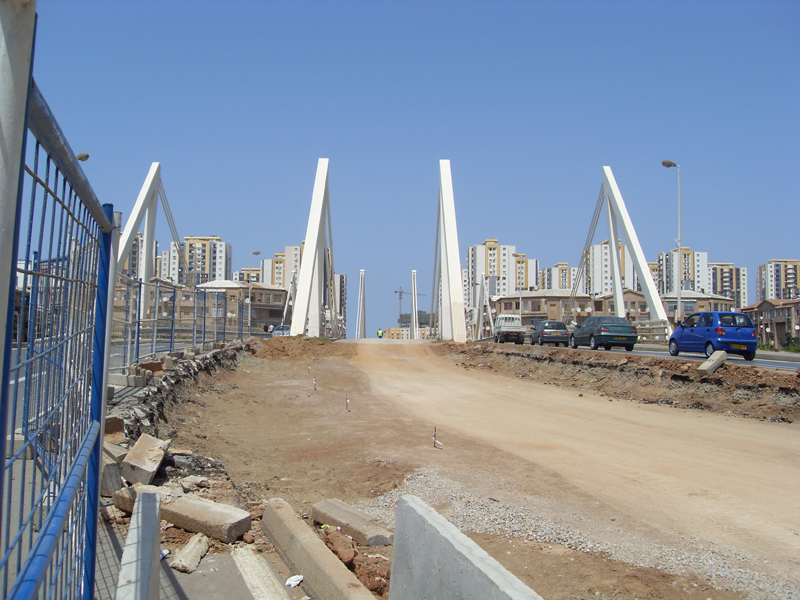

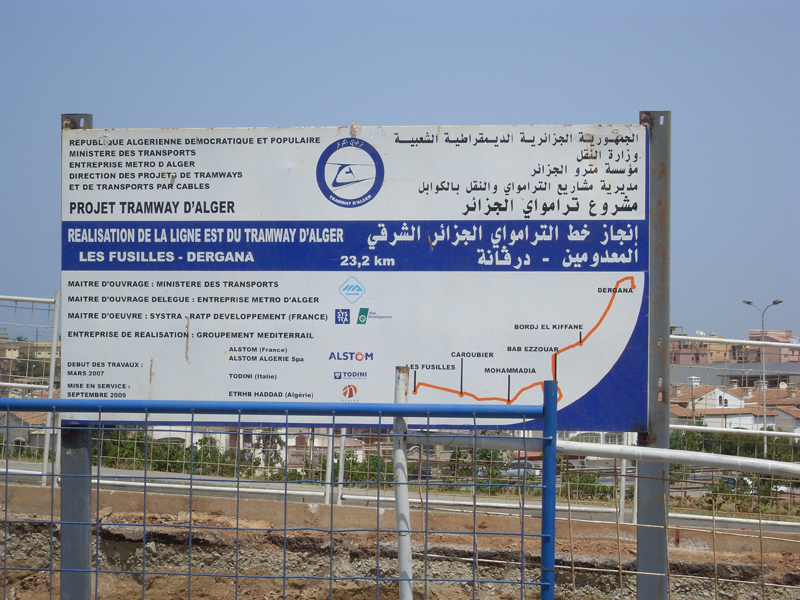

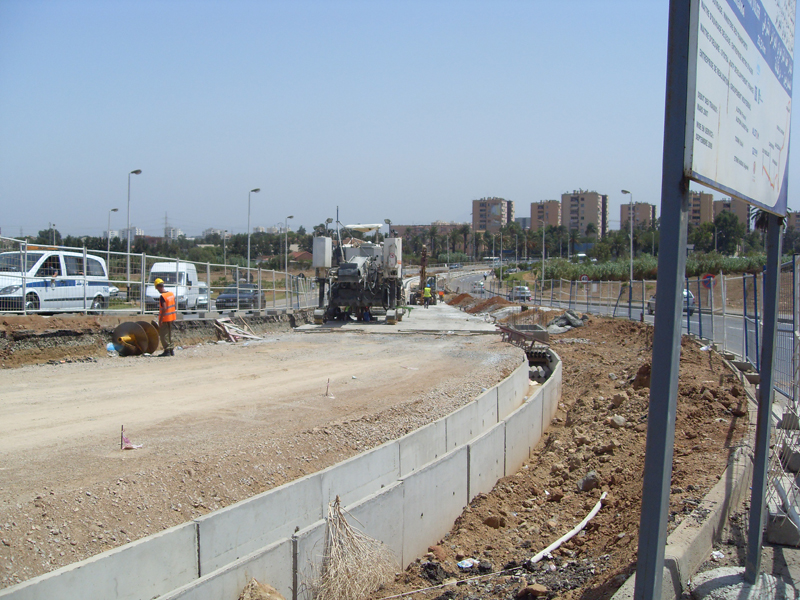

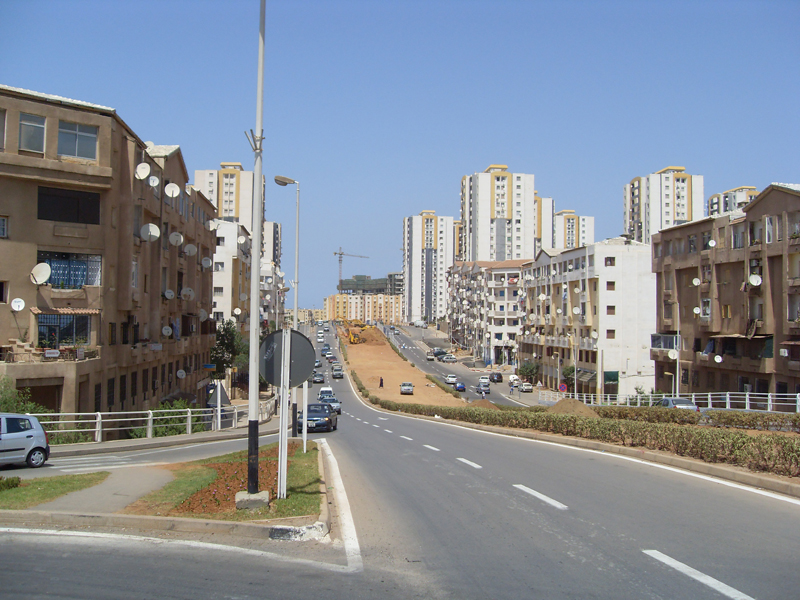

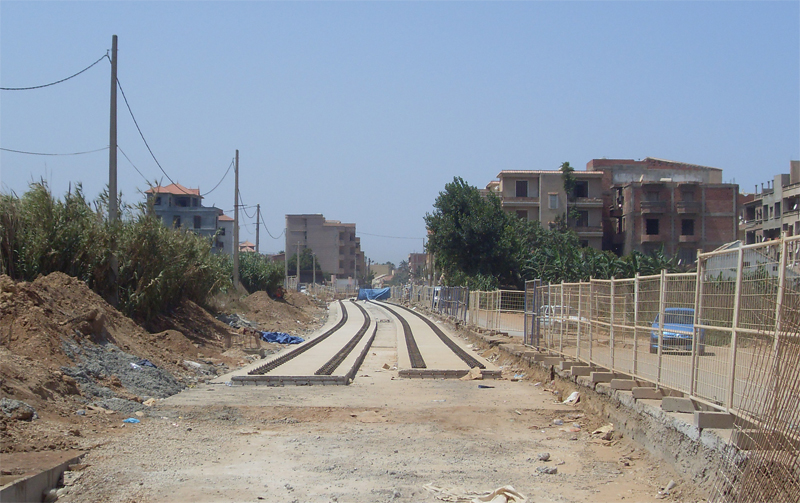

In September 2008, the EMA selected the French company Keolis to operate the tram network. By February 2009, work on the line was approximately 37% complete, with the line's opening being scheduled for 2010. The first of the 41 Alstom Citadis 402 trams ordered for the line was delivered on March 18, 2009.

The contract for the operation of the tram network was officially signed by the EMA and Keolis on April 8, 2009. As part of the contract, Keolis would operate the tram network for ten years, however in February 2010, due to a multitude of judicial and financial issues, the contract was terminated and Keolis withdrew from the Algerian tram market, thus leaving the tramway (now scheduled to open in the first quarter of 2011) without a designated operator.

The first test run on the tramway occurred on May 15, 2010, over a distance of around 2 kilometres (1.2 mi) near the depot in Bordj El Kiffan. In September 2010, the EMA provisionally conceded operation of the tramway to the Entreprise de transport urbain et suburbain d'Alger (ETUSA), Algiers' public bus operator. On December 20, 2010, the first section of the tramway, from the Mokhtar Zerhouni district to Bordj El Kiffan, was officially handed over from the Mediterrail consortium partners to the EMA.

==== 2011-2015: Opening and extensions ====
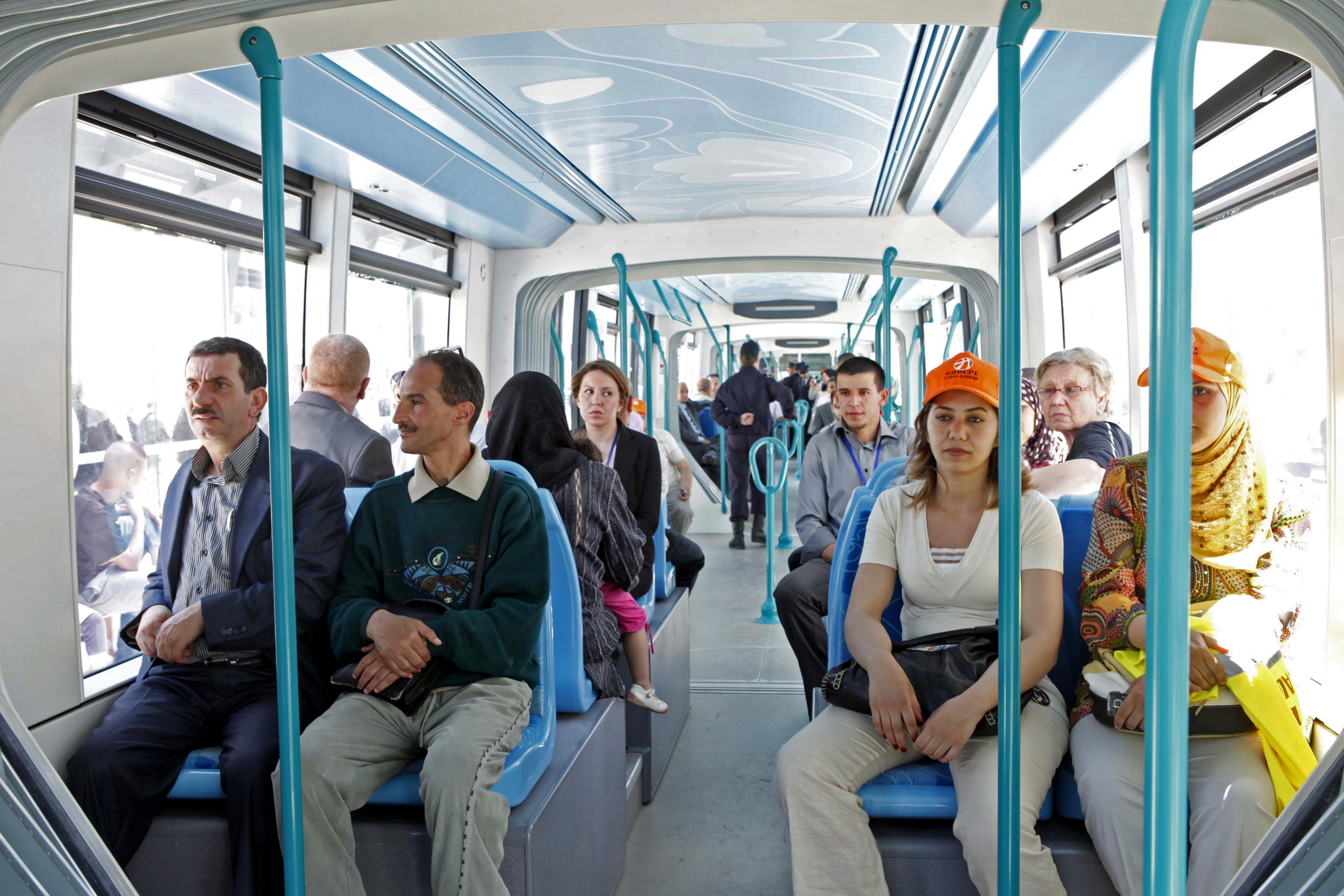
Passengers on board a tram on the network's inauguration day.

The first phase of the new tramway, running for 7.2 kilometres (4.5 mi) from the Mokhtar Zerhouni district (Tamaris station) to the depot at Bordj El Kiffan (Mimouni Hamoud station), officially opened on May 8, 2011.

The second stage of the line, extending west from Tamaris to the city centre at Ruisseau over a length of 9.1 kilometres (5.7 mi), opened on June 15, 2012, providing connections with the metro at the line's terminus at Ruisseau/Les Fusillés and the Algiers suburban rail at Caroubier. In October 2012, operation of the tramway was transferred from the ETUSA to SETRAM (Société d'exploitation des tramways), a joint-venture formed by the EMA, the ETUSA, and RATP Dev earlier in May of that year for the operation of tram networks nationwide.

Test running on the third phase of the tramway, from Bordj El Kiffan east to Café Chergui, began in January 2014. The 4.2 km (2.6 mi) long extension later opened on April 16, 2014.

The tramway's final extension, from Café Chergui further east to Dergana Centre over a distance of 2.7 kilometres (1.7 mi), opened on June 14, 2015. On December 21, 2015, an infill stop called Ben Redouane also opened between the Ben Merabet and Ben Merad stations.

== System ==
=== Route ===
The tramway network's only line runs on an east-west route, starting at Ruisseau station in the southeastern part of the city centre and then turning right onto Tripoli Avenue and paralleling the SNTF's mainline railway out of Algiers. The line then crosses over the railway at Caroubier station and continues to run alongside it until splitting off near La Glacière station. The line crosses the El Harrach river on a bridge and then runs alongside and in the median of the N5 and N24 motorways until Tamaris station, where it leaves the motorway and curves sharply south to serve the Mokhtar Zerhouni, Rabia Taher and 5 Juillet residential neighbourhoods, as well as the Houari Boumédiène Technological University. The line reaches its southernmost point at Université de Bab Ezzouar (USTHB) station before turning back north towards Bordj El Kiffan, running east through its town centre before rejoining the N24 motorway and running alongside it in a northeasterly direction until Faculté Biomedicale stop, where the line turns south once again to serve the residential centre of Dergana, where it terminates. The line's total length of 23.2 kilometres (14.4 mi) makes it the longest tramway currently operating in Algeria.

From its terminus at Ruisseau until it crosses the El Harrach river, the line runs on the former route of the CFRA network's line to El Harrach.

=== Infrastructure ===
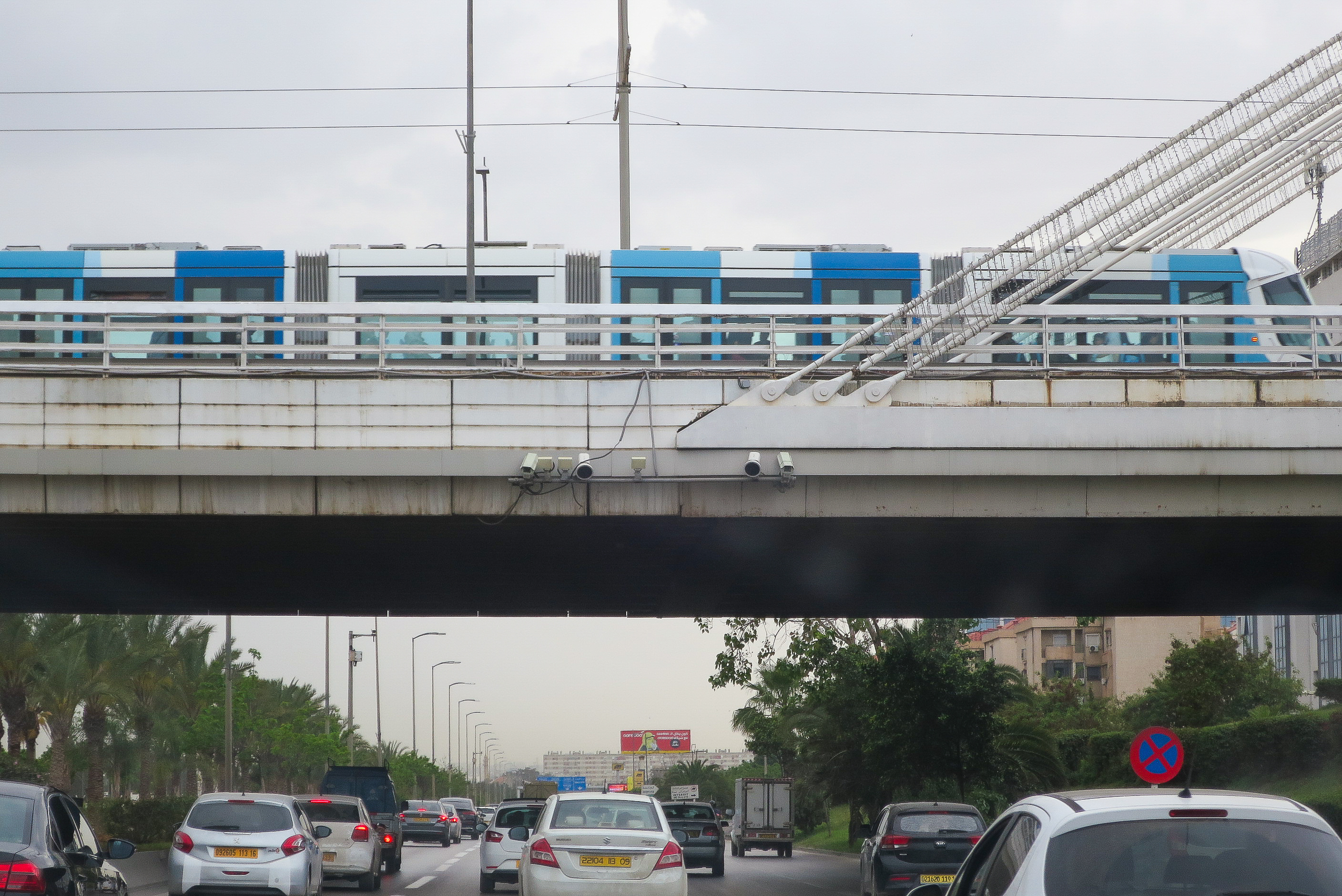
A tram on the Bananiers bridge over the N11 motorway near Bab Ezzouar, May 2025

The line runs entirely on its own right-of-way, alongside or in the median of roads, however it includes level crossings in order to allow road vehicles to cross its route. Additionally, several bridges have been built specifically for the tramway, in order to facilitate grade separation on the line. Between the stations of Caroubier and La Glaicère, there is a level intersection between the tracks of the tramway and those of the SNTF's freight branch to the Caroubier fuel depot. It is the only place in Algeria where trams and mainline-level railways intersect.

The line runs on standard-gauge (1435 mm) rails, and electricity is supplied by a 750 V DC overhead line. The tram depot is located near Bordj El Kiffan, in between the Mouhous and Mimouni Hamoud stations.

=== Stations ===
	Stations	Commune served	Connections
■	Ruisseau - الرويسو	Hussein Dey	(Les Fusillés station)
●	Les Fusillés - المعدومين	Hussein Dey
●	Tripoli-Thaalibia - طرابلس-الثعالبية	Hussein Dey
●	Tripoli-Mosquée - طرابلس-المسجد	Hussein Dey	(Hussein Dey station)
●	Tripoli-Hamadeche - طرابلس-حمداش	Hussein Dey
●	Tripoli-El Magharia - طرابلس المقرية	Hussein Dey
●	Carroubier - الخروبة	Hussein Dey	(Caroubier station)
●	La Glacière -الهواء الجميل	El Harrach
●	Pont El Harrach - جسر الحراش	El Harrach
●	Belle Vue - المنظر الجميل	El Harrach
●	Bekri Bouguerra - بكري بوقرة	El Harrach
●	Cinq Maisons - الديار الخمس	Mohammedia
●	Foire d'Alger - قصر المعارض	Mohammedia
●	Les Pins - الصنوبر	Mohammedia
●	Tamaris - حيّ المندرين	Mohammedia
●	Cité Mokhtar Zerhouni - حي مختار زرهوني	Mohammedia
●	Cité Rabia - حي رابية	Bab Ezzouar
●	Université de Bab Ezzouar - جامعة باب الزوار	Bab Ezzouar
●	Cité 5 juillet - حي 5 جويلية	Bab Ezzouar	(Rabia Tahar station, under construction)
●	Bab Ezzouar - Le Pont - باب الزوار - الجسر	Bab Ezzouar
●	Cité Universitaire - CUB1 - الحي الجامعي - ح ج ب 1	Bab Ezzouar
●	Cité 8 Mai 1945 - حي 8 ماي 1945	Bab Ezzouar
●	Clair Matin- حي الصباح	Bordj El Kiffan
●	Bordj El Kiffan - Lycée - برج الكيفان - الثانوية	Bordj El Kiffan
●	Borfj El Kiffan - Centre - برج الكيفان - وسط	Bordj El Kiffan
●	Bordj El Kiffan - Polyclinique - برج الكيفان - العيادة الطبية	Bordj El Kiffan
●	Mouhous - موحوس	Bordj El Kiffan
●	Mimouni Hamoud - ميموني حمود	Bordj El Kiffan
●	Ben Merabet - بني مرابط	Bordj El Kiffan
●	Ben Redouane - بني رضوان	Bordj El Kiffan
●	Ben Merad - بني مراد	Bordj El Kiffan
●	Sidi Dris - سيدي إدريس	Bordj El Kiffan
●	Benzergua - بني زرقة	Bordj El Kiffan
●	Café Chergui - مقهى شرقي	Bordj El Bahri
●	Faculté Biomédicale - جامعة درقانة	Bordj El Bahri
●	Dergana Cité - حي درقانة	Bordj El Bahri
■	Dergana Centre - درقانة وسط	Bordj El Bahri

== Rolling stock ==
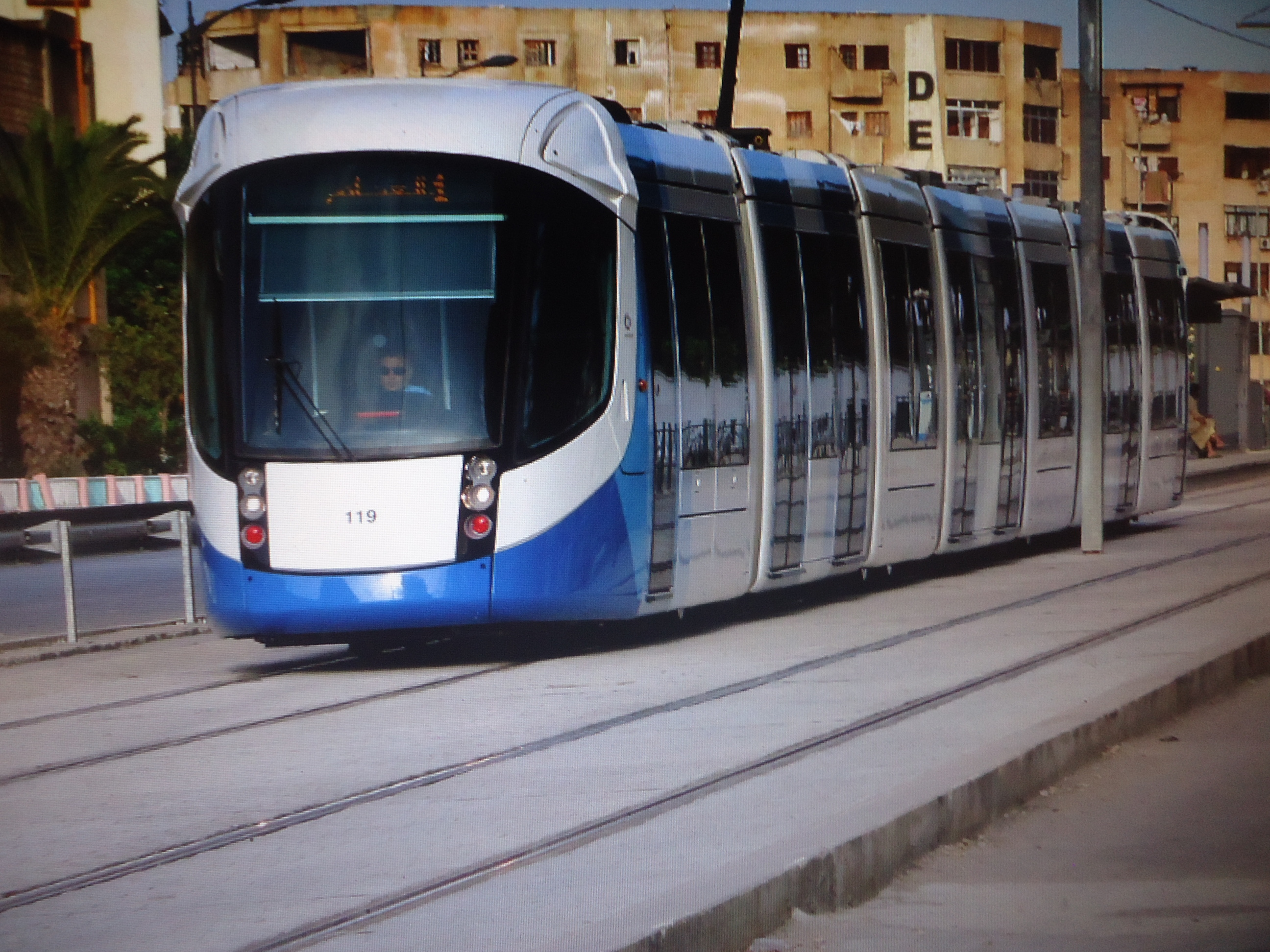
Tram #119 on a westbound service to Ruisseau in 2013.

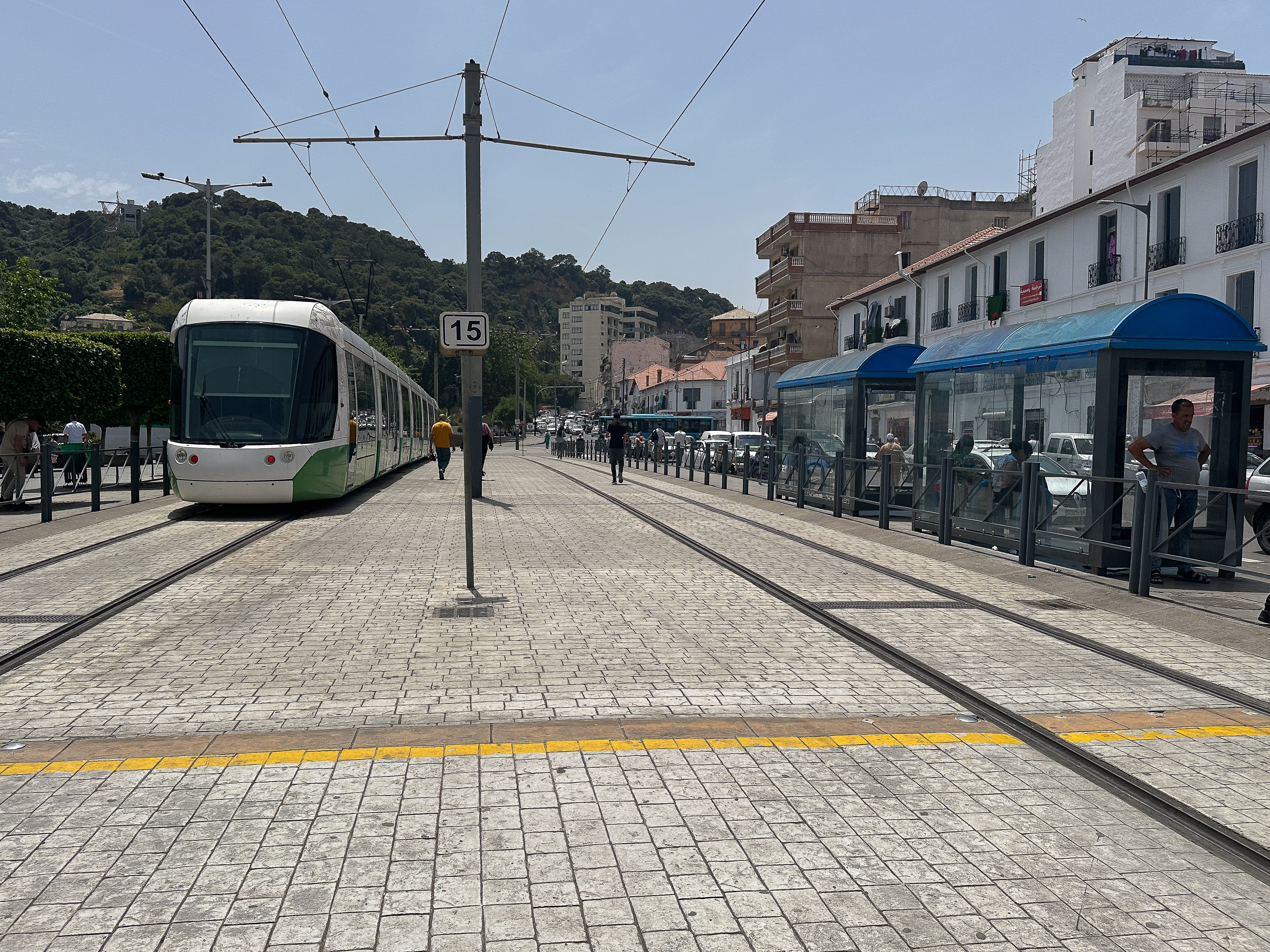
A Constantine tram at Ruisseau station in 2026.

The tramway is operated with 48 7-section Alstom Citadis 402 vehicles.

Ordered as a part of the turnkey tramway contract in 2006, the trams were manufactured at the Alstom factory in La Rochelle, France. The low-floor trams were designed by the French agency RCP Design Global, and have a livery of blue and white, similar to other forms of public transit in Algiers (including the metro, suburban rail, and buses). The first tram arrived in Algiers on March 18, 2009, and delivery continued until 2011.

An additional order of seven trams was placed in 2007, to be put in service for the tramway's extensions. These supplemental trams were delivered in 2012, and entered service in conjunction with the network's eastern extension in April 2014.

Due to the tramway's popularity, the existing fleet soon proved not to be enough to meet the demands of ridership. As a result, in 2024, two trams were transferred from the Constantine tramway network to Algiers in order to meet capacity. It is possible that more trams may be transferred from Constantine in the future, as the city's network has a large surplus of trams due to an unrealised extension plan.

== See also ==
- Algiers Metro
- List of town tramway systems in Africa
- Template:Suburban railways in Africa
