= Postage stamps and postal history of Algeria =

This is a survey of the postage stamps and postal history of Algeria.

== Early postal history ==
The beginning date for postal history in Algeria is unclear, but letters sent by Europeans in Algiers go back to 1690. Oran was controlled by Spain during much of the 18th century, and a postal marking is known from 1749.

Regular postal service came in with the French rule in Algeria, initially as a military post established in 1830 in Algiers, which was then opened to civilians in 1835, but still using military handstamps until 1839, after which datestamps with town names became standard. The service expanded into the interior along with French control, with 295 post offices in operation by 1880.

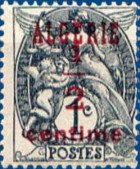
French stamp overprinted for use in Algeria, 1924

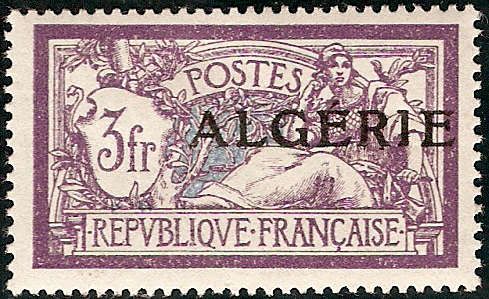
A French Merson type stamp overprinted for use in Algeria, 1924

== First stamps ==
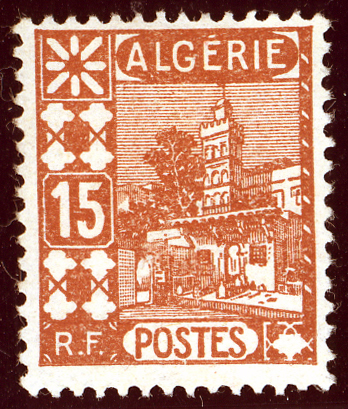
1926 definitive series

Algerian mail used stamps of France beginning 1 January 1849. Early cancellations were a simple grill similar to French usage, but after 1852 the service switched to a lozenge of dots surrounding a number identifying the post office.

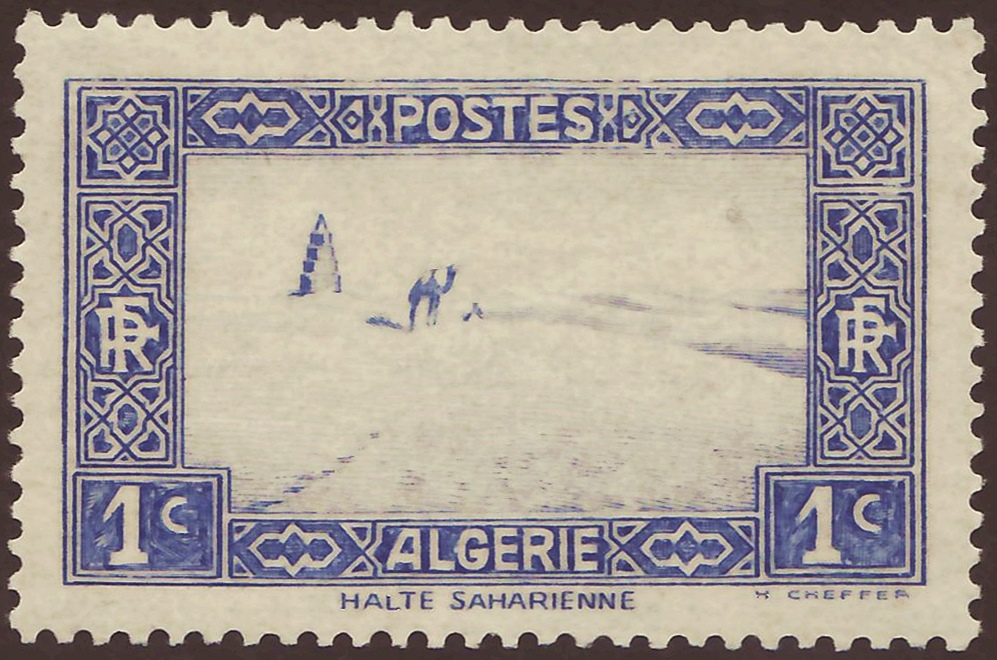
1936 definitive series

== Twentieth century ==
Beginning in 1924, French stamps were overprinted "ALGÉRIE", eventually to total some 32 types over the next few years. These were superseded in 1926 by the first stamps inscribed for Algeria, the series consisting of four typographed designs showing local scenes, and ultimately consisting of 35 types, ranging from 1 centime to 20 francs. Algeria's first commemorative stamp, a 10-franc value depicting the Bay of Algiers, marked the 100th anniversary of French control. A new definitive series in 1936 again depicted local scenery, using eight engraved designs for 31 values.

In 1942, a photolithographed set featured the arms of Algerian cities, and was issued both with and without the engraver's name in the lower left margin. Following the liberation of France, stamps were issued depicting Marianne and the Gallic cock, in designs similar to French stamps; in addition, the old "ALGÉRIE" overprint was revived and applied to French stamps until 1947.

In 1947, a new set of 16 definitives also featured city coats of arms, and remained in use throughout the 1950s, along with a handful of commemoratives. Algeria reverted to the use of French stamps between 1958 and 1962.

== Independence ==
Independent Algeria started its own stamp programme on 2 July 1962, with locally applied overprints reading "EA" on stocks of French stamps. These overprints exist in a wide variety of colours and typefaces. These continued in use until 31 October 1962, and were superseded the following day by a set of five designs showing local scenes, and inscribed "REPUBLIQUE ALGERIENNE" in both French and Arabic (the first appearance of Arabic on Algerian stamps).

Algeria's definitive series since independence include a set showing occupations in 1964, a depiction of Abd-el-Kader in 1967, and multiple issues showing local views starting in 1982.

== Postal stationery ==
French postal stationery envelopes, newspaper wrappers, letter cards and postcards were also overprinted "ALGÉRIE" and issued in 1924. These were followed by postal stationery printed for Algeria in 1927. Envelopes, newspaper wrappers and lettercards were discontinued in the early 1940s.

When Algeria became an independent republic in 1962 the only item of postal stationery to be issued was a postcard. Subsequently, in 1976 Algeria issued aerogrammes.

== References and sources ==
Sources

- Rossiter, Stuart & John Flower. The Stamp Atlas. London: Macdonald, 1986. ISBN 0-356-10862-7
- Scott catalogue
