= Urban and suburban transport company of Algiers =

- Type: State-owned
- Industry: Public transport
- Founded: 1882
- Headquarters: Algiers, Algeria
- Services: Bus
- Website: https://www.etusa.dz/

The Urban and suburban transport company of Algiers (Arabic: مؤسسة النقل الحضري وشبه الحضري لمدينة الجزائر, French: Entreprise de transport urbain et suburbain d'Alger) abbreviated ETUSA, is an Algerian public company that provides surface public transportation services in the city of Algiers and its metropolitan area.

== History ==
Established in 1959 under the French name Régie syndicale des transports algérois (RSTA), it managed the bus, trolleybus, and tram networks in Algiers. After independence and the abandonment of tram and trolleybus lines, RSTA continued to be the sole public transport operator until the sector was opened up by decree in February 1987.

The early 1990s witnessed a disengagement by the Algerian government and an opening up of the sector to private competition. This, along with an outdated fleet and chronic deficits, quickly rendered the public transport provider obsolete. The company was quickly overtaken by a much more dynamic and less constrained private transportation sector.

Around the turn of the 2000s, marked by economic growth and political stability, the government, through the Ministry of Transport, recognized the crucial role they played in regulating a chaotic situation. They revitalized the public company, which gradually regained credibility under the name ETUSA since 2001. The company modernized its infrastructure network for maintenance and training through a convention with the Belgian Technical Cooperation (CTB), which concluded in 2007.

After being transformed into a joint-stock company (SPA) in 1998, the Benflis government transformed it into a public industrial and commercial establishment (EPIC) in 2002.
