= Bab Ezzouar Shopping Mall =

Centre Commercial Bab Ezzouar
- المركز التجاري لباب الزوار
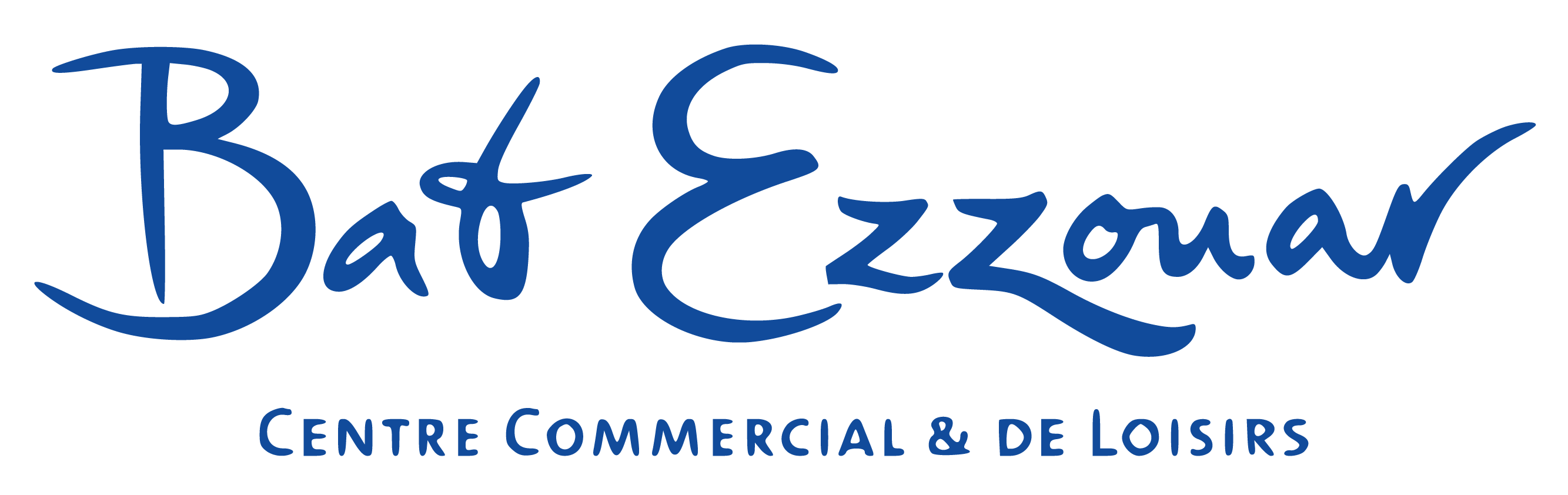
- Location: Algiers, Algeria
- Coordinates: 36.7122°N 3.1967°E
- Opened: 5 July 2010
- Developer: Valartis bank
- Owner: SCCA (Société des Centres Commerciaux d'Algérie SpA)
- Num. of stores: 120
- Floor area: 31,000 m^{2} (330,000 sq ft)
- Floors: 3 floors 2 building offices
- Parking: 850 places
- Website: www.babezzouar-dz.com

The Centre Commercial Bab Ezzouar (Arabic: المركز التجاري لباب الزوار) is a shopping mall in Algiers, Algeria.

The construction of the Centre Commercial Bab Ezzouar was in charge of the Swiss bank Valartis. Construction began in May 2007 and was planned for completion in November 2009; however, after problems arose the mall opening was delayed until August 2010.
