= Bordj El Bahri =

Bordj El Bahri برج البحرى
- Municipality
- Commune of Bordj El Bahri
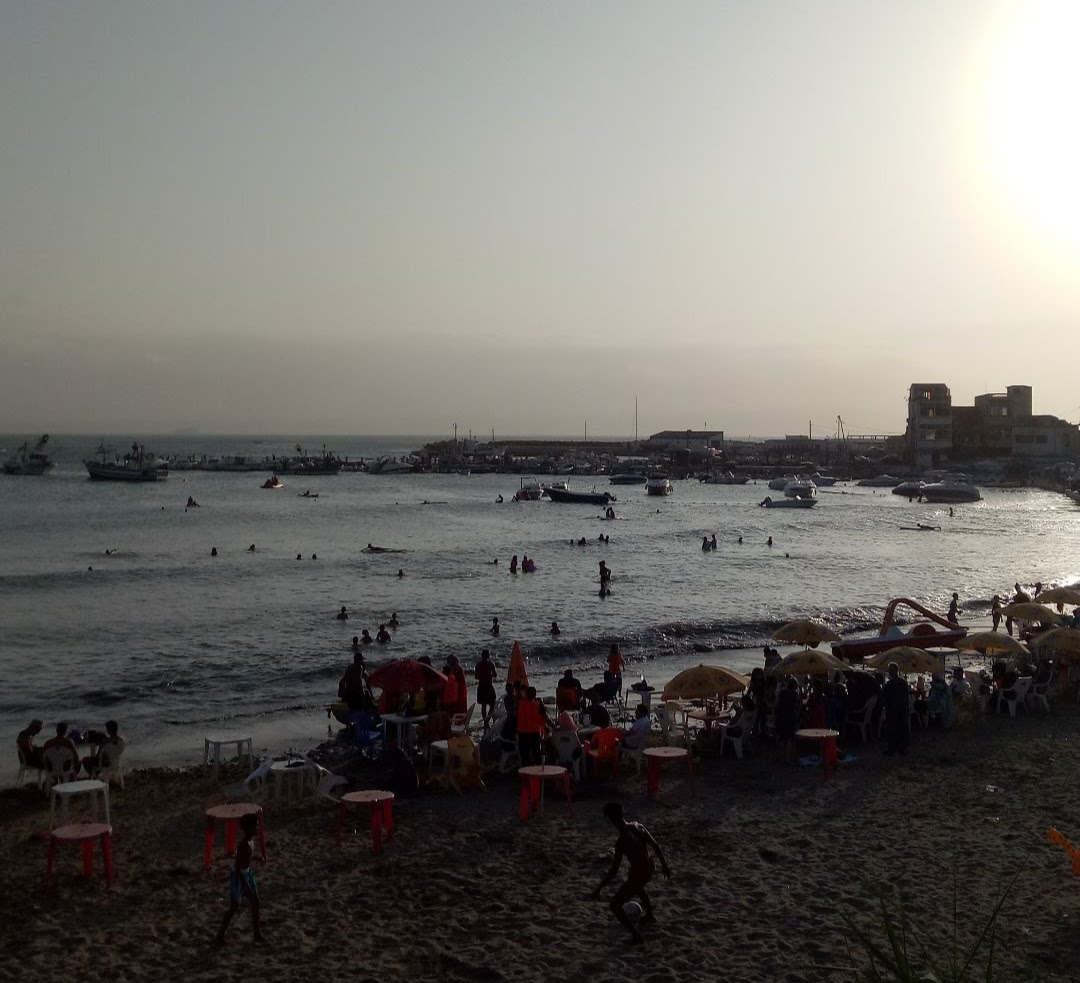
- The Mediterranean Sea as seen from Bordj El Bahri

- Location of the commune within Algiers

- Location within Algeria
- Coordinates: 36°49′N 3°14′E
- Country: Algeria
- Province: Algiers

Population (1998 )
  - Total: 27,900
- Time zone: UTC+1 (CET)

Bordj El Bahri is a municipality of the city of Algiers in northern Algeria. Bordj El Bahri is on the peninsula that forms the eastern side of Algiers Bay.
