= Mohammedia, Algiers =

Coordinates: 36°44′N 3°08′E

Mohamadia
- Interactive map of Mohamadia
- Country: Algeria
- Province: Algiers
- Time zone: UTC+1 (West Africa Time)

Mohamadia is a suburb of the city of Algiers in northern Algeria.
