= Dar El Beïda =

Dar El Beïda: الدار البيضاء (Arabic); ⴷⴰⵔ ⵍⴱⴻⵢⴷⴰ (Berber languages)
- Municipality
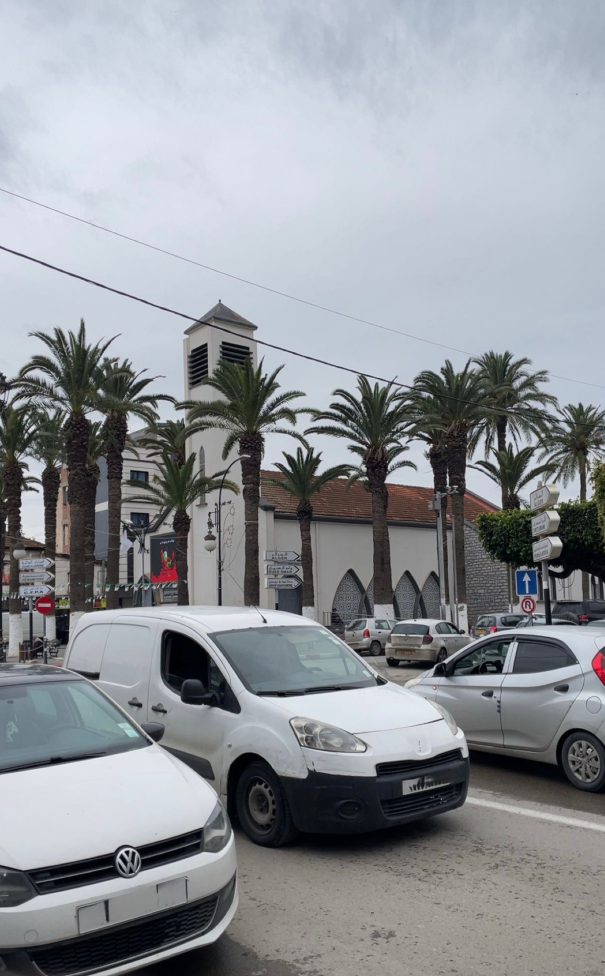
- Center Of Dar El Beïda

- Location of the municipality within Algiers Province

- Location in Algeria
- Coordinates: 36.714256°N 3.212385°E
- Country: Algeria
- Province: Algiers
- District: Dar El Beïda District

Area
  - Total: 32 km^{2} (12 sq mi)

Population (2008)
  - Total: 81,509
  - Density: 2,500/km^{2} (6,600/sq mi)
- Postal code: 16033

Dar El Beïda (Arabic: الدار البيضاء; Berber languages: ⴷⴰⵔ ⵍⴱⴻⵢⴷⴰ) is a municipality and the seat of the eponymous district, in Algiers Province. It is located in the eastern suburbs of the capital, approximately 16 kilometers from Algiers city center, and lies at a crossroads linking the capital to the eastern and southern regions of the country.

Historically, the settlement dates back to the 1840s, when it served as a stagecoach relay known as "Maison-Blanche" (White House) named after a whitewashed wooden building. Designated as a settlement center in 1851, it became an independent municipality in 1882, and gained new importance in 1936 with the development of commercial aviation. During World War II, the town played a significant role with the Anglo-American landings of Operation Torch in November 1942, and later served as an air and logistics base for the Allied forces.

Today, Dar El Beïda has become a major financial and commercial hub, ranking among the municipalities with the highest budgetary resources nationally. It is home to Houari Boumediene Airport, the country's main international airport, and acts as a major transport hub connecting highway networks, railways, and future extensions of the Algiers Metro. Its economy is driven by a large industrial zone housing the headquarters of several major national companies as well as the commercial activity of the El Hamiz neighborhood, thereby reinforcing its role as an economic center and eastern gateway to the capital.

It is bordered by Bordj El Kiffan to the north, Oued Smar and Les Eucalyptus to the south, Rouïba and Hammadi (Boumerdès Province) to the east, and Bab Ezzouar to the west.

== Emergence of Dar El Beïda ==
=== Early history ===
The area now known as Dar El Beïda (formerly Maison-Blanche) originated in the 1840s as a road junction and stagecoach stop (Relais de diligence) on the route leading to the "Fondouk" region. This stop consisted of a whitewashed wooden building including an inn for travelers, which gave the area its name "Maison-Blanche". Its agricultural beginnings were also linked to the property of an individual named Charles Muller who settled there in 1840.

=== Establishment ===
"Maison-Blanche" was officially created as a "settlement center" by a presidential decree issued by the French colonial administration under Louis-Napoléon Bonaparte in 1851, as part of a plan to settle European families in the Mitidja plain. Geographically, the region was described in documents as being very flat, with an altitude not exceeding 30 meters, and bounded by Oued Smar to the west and the El Hamiz River to the east.

=== Administrative independence ===
In its early days, Dar El Beïda was not an independent municipality but was administratively dependent on the center of "La Rassauta" (which also included parts of Bordj El Kiffan). This situation continued until June 2, 1882, when an official decree divided "La Rassauta", thus elevating "Maison-Blanche" to the status of an independent municipality with all its prerogatives.

=== Development of aviation ===
A significant development came in 1936 with the start of commercial air transport development, where the first concrete runway for aircraft, 1450 meters long, was built between 1938 and 1940, marking the origins of what would become Algiers International Airport.

Historical images of Dar El Beïda

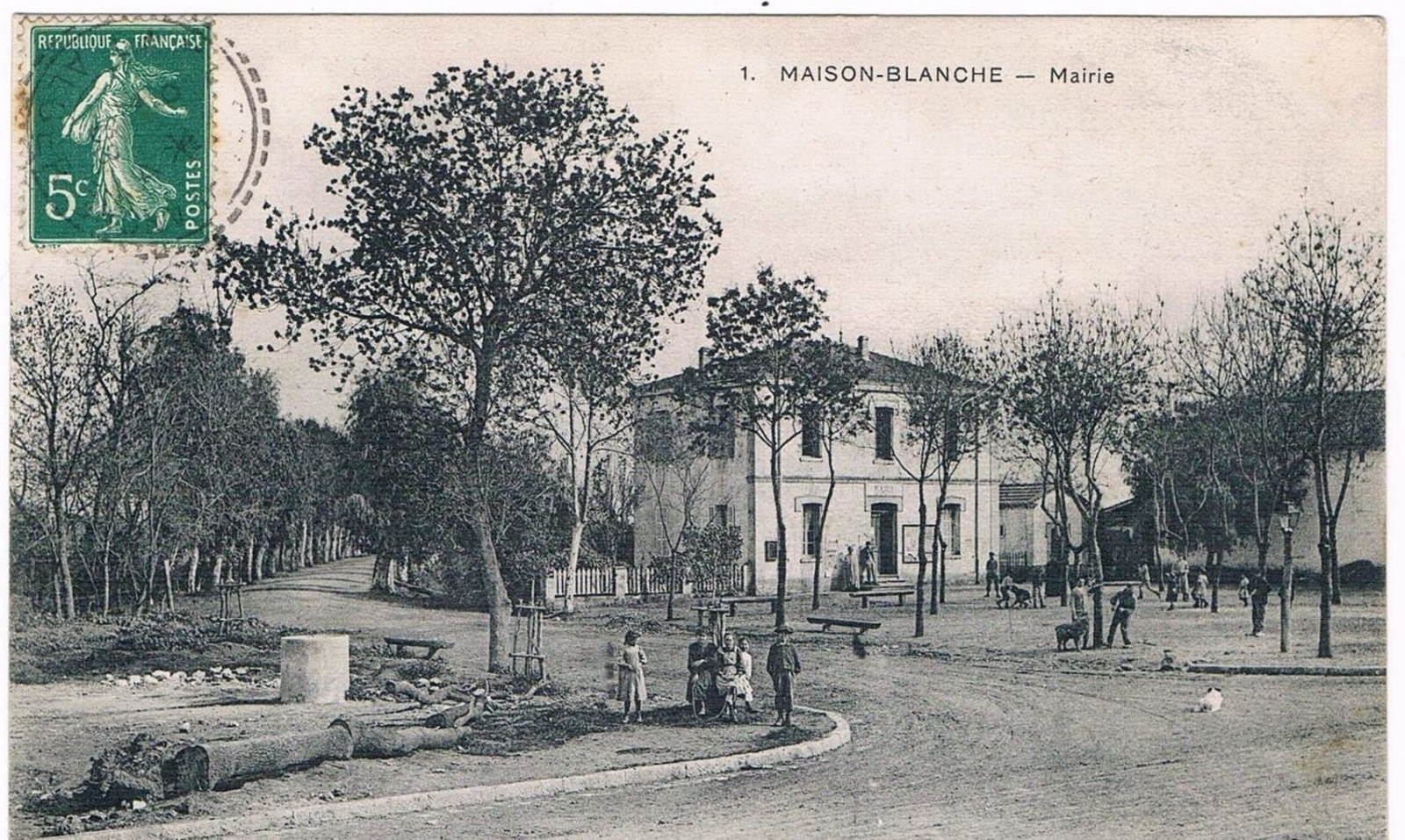
Old town hall (Mairie) during the French colonial period

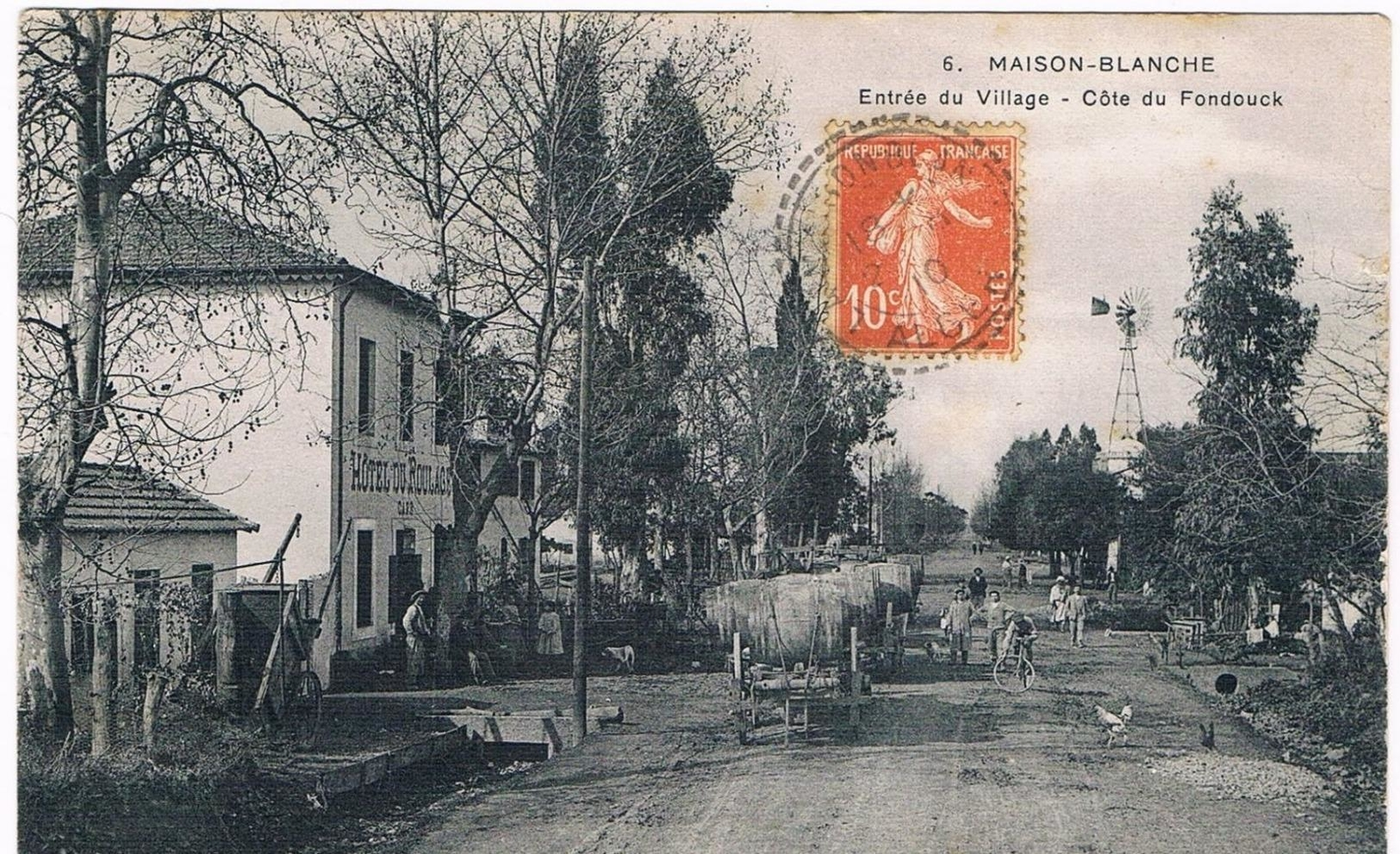
Old village entrance

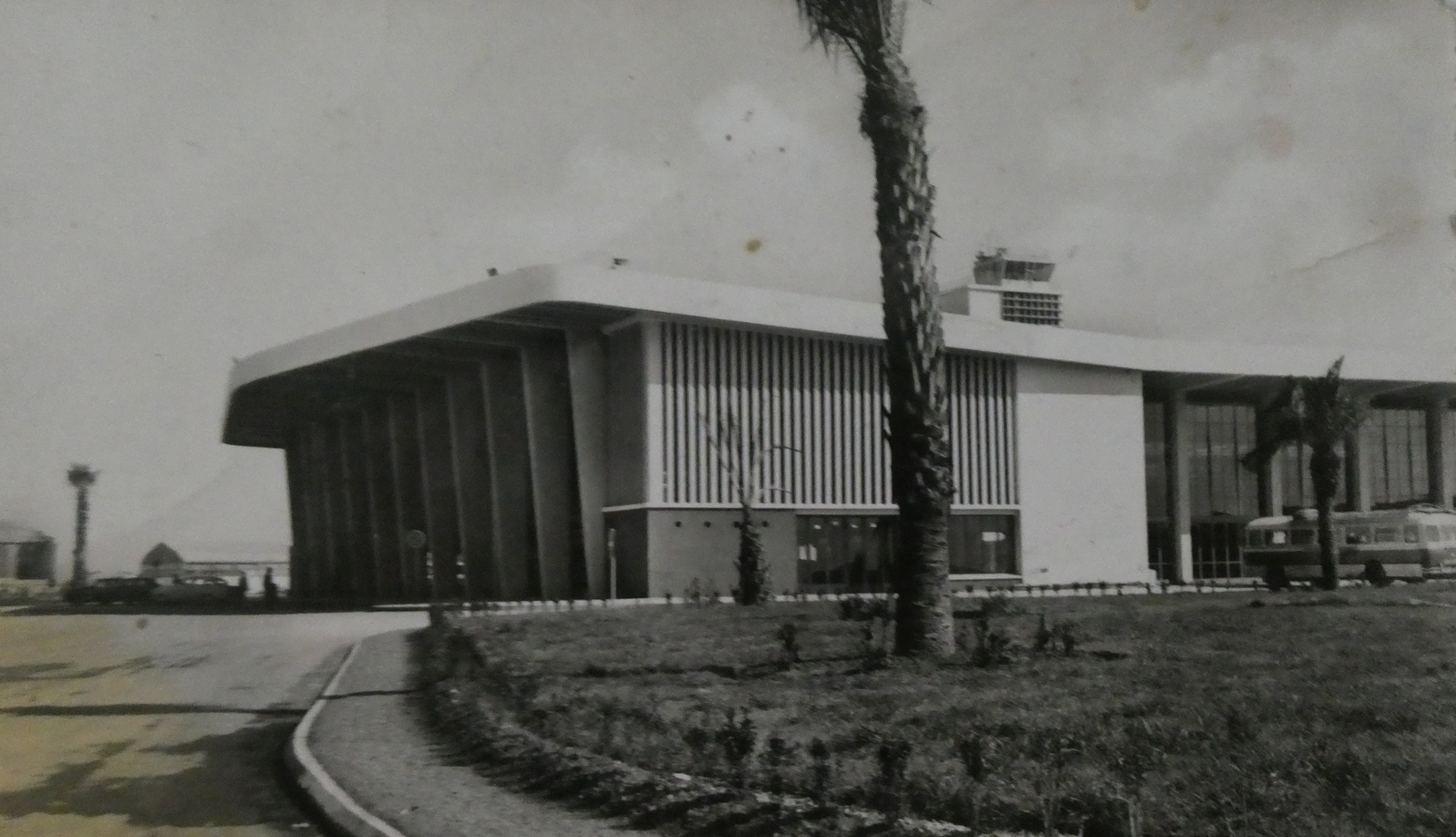
Old terminal of Algiers Airport

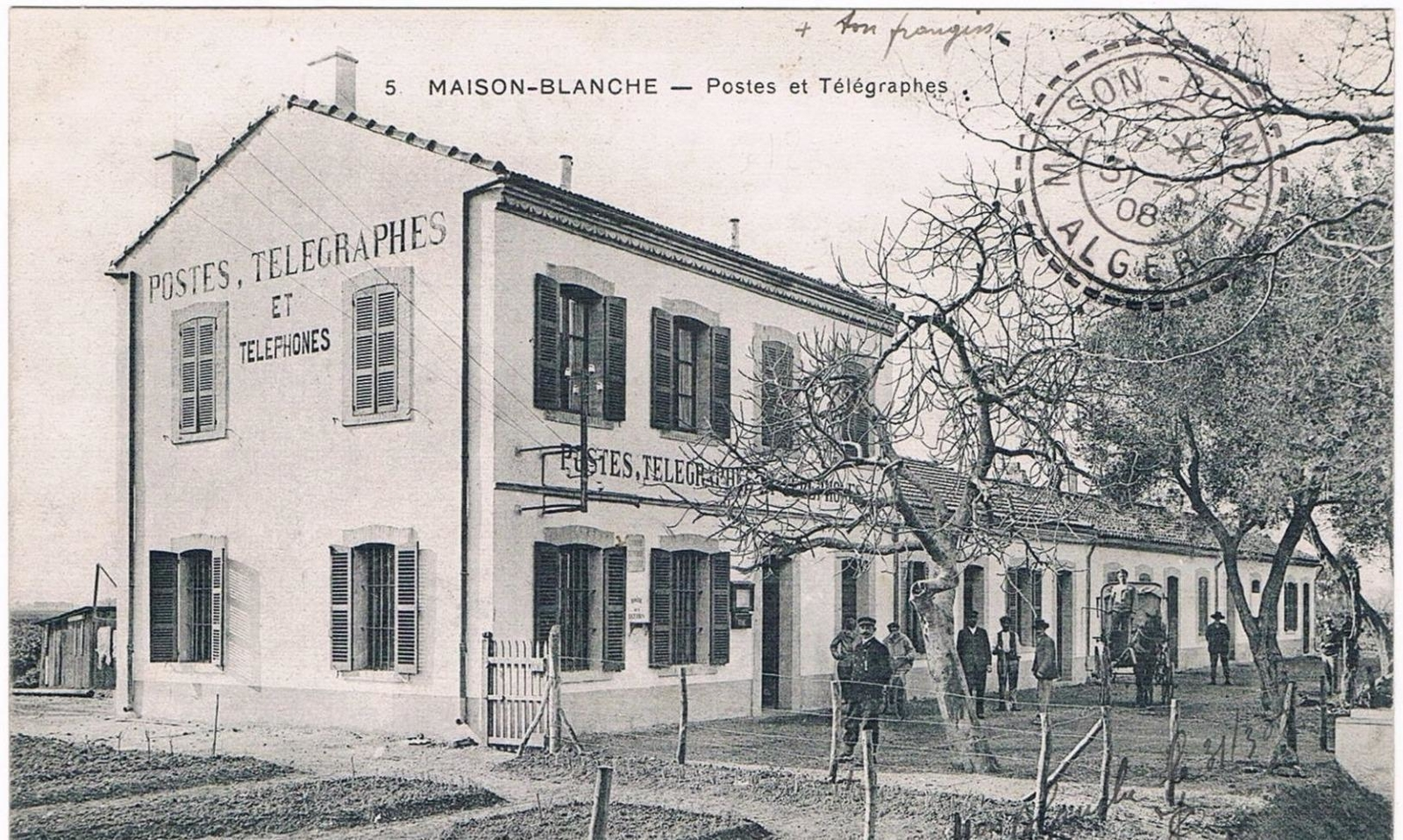
Old post and telegraph office

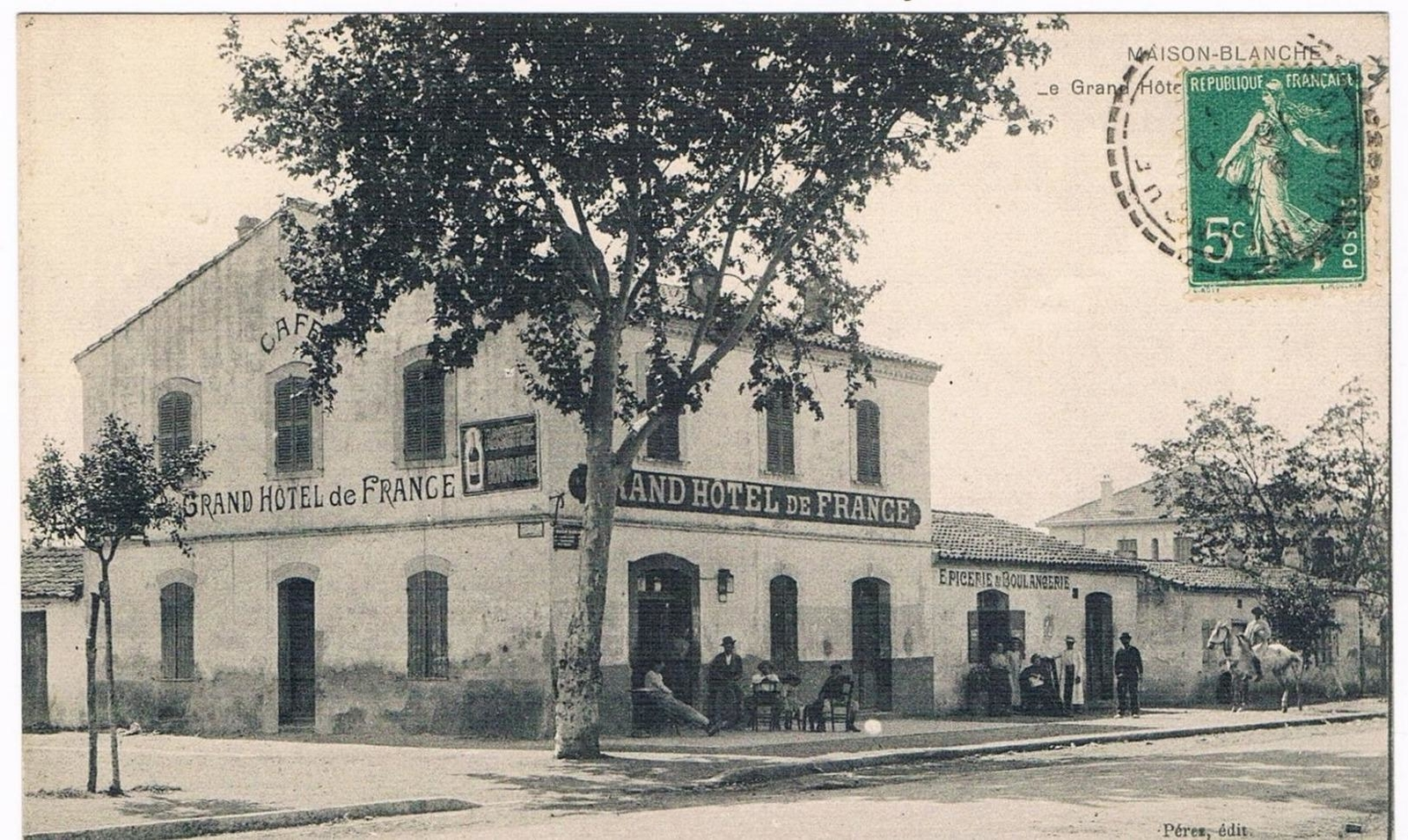
Grand Hôtel de France (Old name)

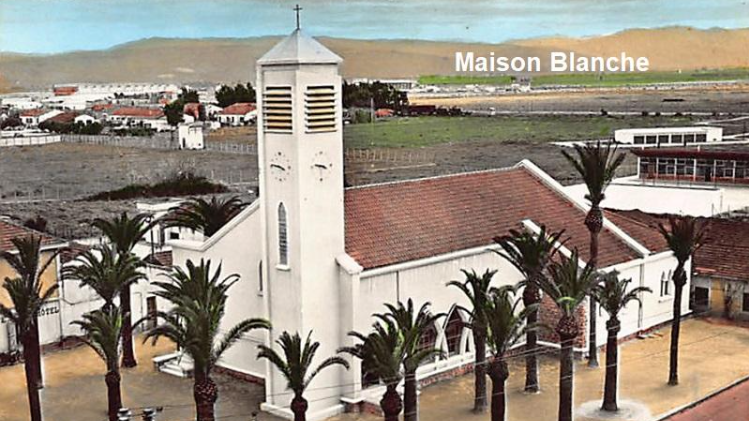
Old church

=== World War II and Operation Torch ===
During World War II, the municipality and its airport played a central role in the North African theater. On November 8, 1942, the region was the scene of Anglo-American landings in North Africa to end the Vichy French government's control over Algerian territories as part of what became known as Operation Torch. Given the importance of air cover, the "Maison-Blanche" airport was classified as a top-priority military target. Following the Allied landings on the eastern beaches of Algiers (such as Surcouf beach in Aïn Taya), units of the US 34th Infantry Division advanced and seized control of the airport.

Historical images of the Anglo-American landing during WWII

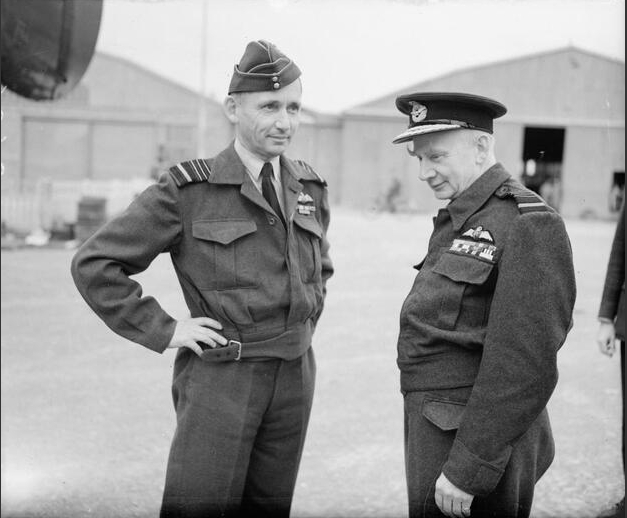
Allied military commanders, Sir Frederick Browning with Sir Arthur Tedder

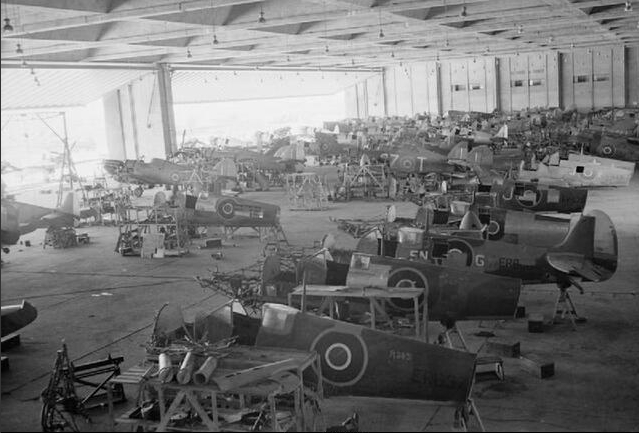
Aircraft assembly and maintenance workshop

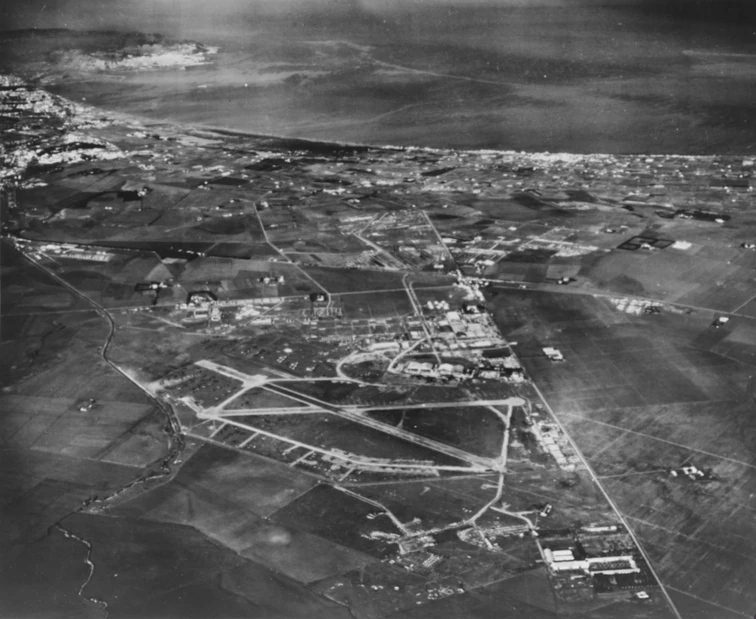
Aerial view of the airport

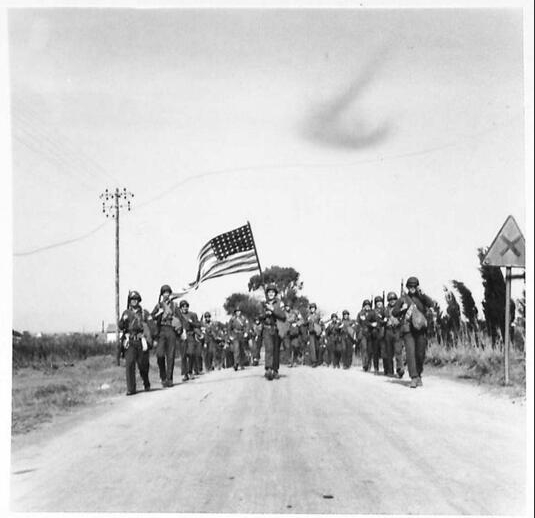
Advance of American infantry

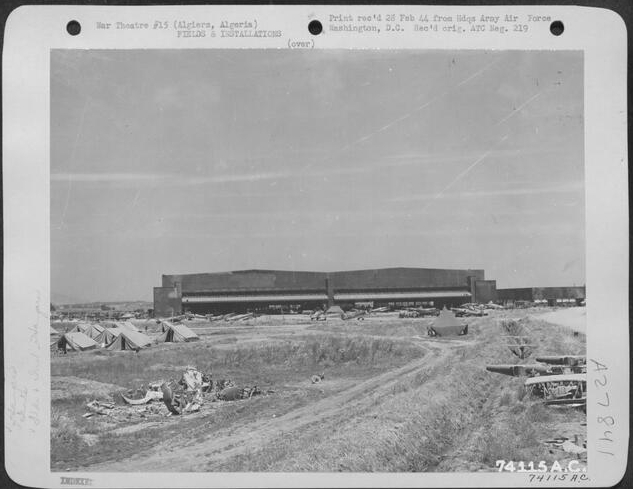
Airport tarmac and military tents

Once secured, the airport and surrounding region were transformed into a major air base and logistics center classified in US military records as "War Theatre #15". This base supported Allied operations during the Tunisian campaign and later during the invasion of Italy. Consequently, the airport became a frequent target of Luftwaffe air raids to hinder Allied supplies. These attacks peaked in late November (specifically the night of November 21, 1942), causing severe damage to several aircraft hangars, prompting Allied forces to establish an anti-aircraft defense network around the base.

Historical images Of the Nazi air attack

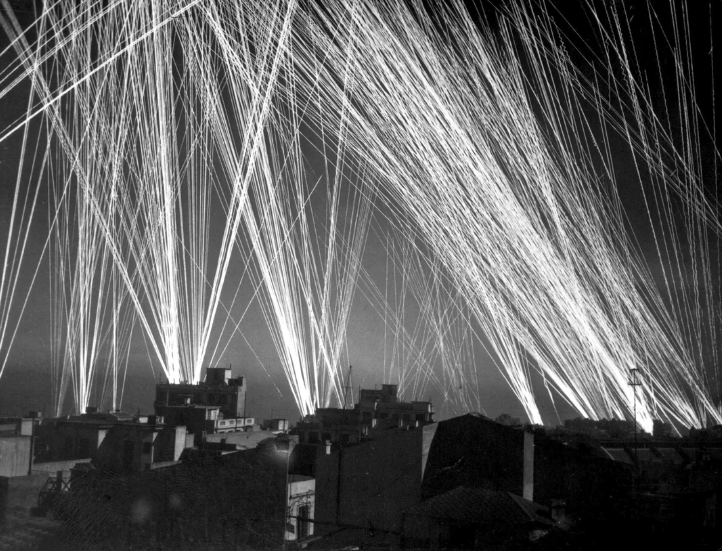
Night sky illuminated by anti-aircraft fire towards German "Luftwaffe" bombers during a night raid

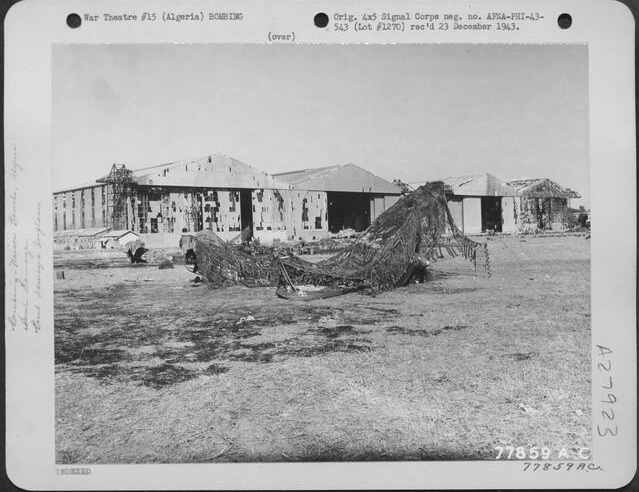
Damaged hangars and camouflage netting following the Nazi attack

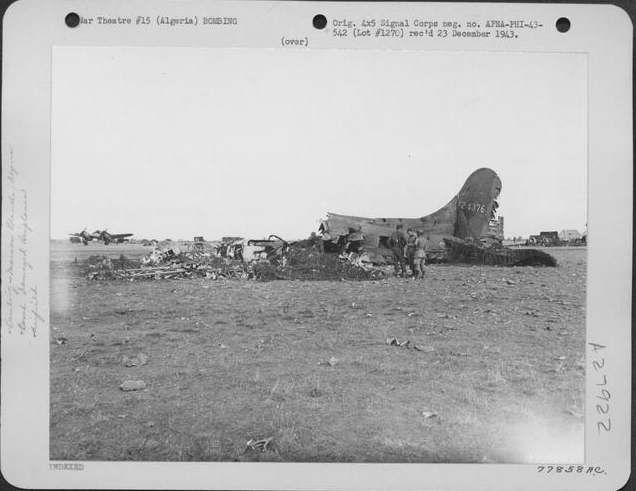
Wreckage of a destroyed bomber following the Nazi attack

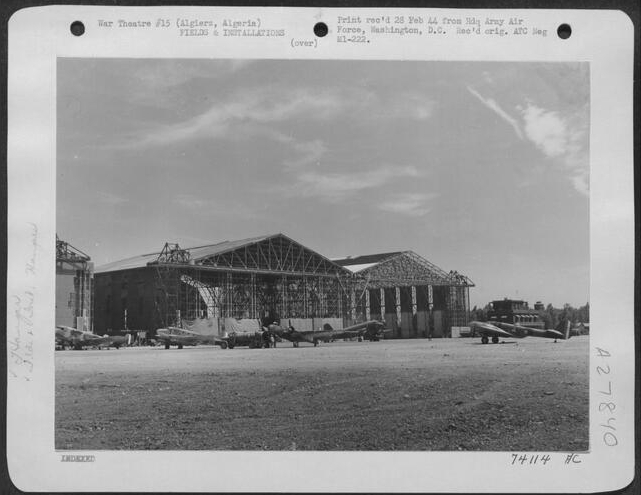
Hangars undergoing restoration

=== Post-independence period and name change ===
Following Algeria's independence in 1962, the Algerian State undertook the Arabization of city and municipality names as part of a broader policy of decolonization. Consequently, the French name "Maison-Blanche" was translated into its Arabic equivalent to become the official name of the municipality, "Dar El Beïda". Since then, the municipality has developed from an agricultural and military zone into a significant urban, industrial, and commercial center of the Algerian capital.

== Economy ==
The municipality of Dar El Beïda ranks among the wealthiest municipalities in Algeria and leads Algiers Province in annual financial resources. As of 2012, according to the Ministry of the Interior, the municipality's annual resources amounted to approximately 4.5 billion Algerian dinars.

The municipality's revenues are primarily from three major sources:

- Aviation and Services: Driven by activity linked to Houari Boumediene Airport and its logistical facilities.
- Industrial Taxation: Revenues generated by the Tax on Professional Activity (TAP) from the large industrial zone shared with the Oued Smar municipality.
- Commercial activity: The El Hamiz neighborhood contributes significantly to local tax revenue.
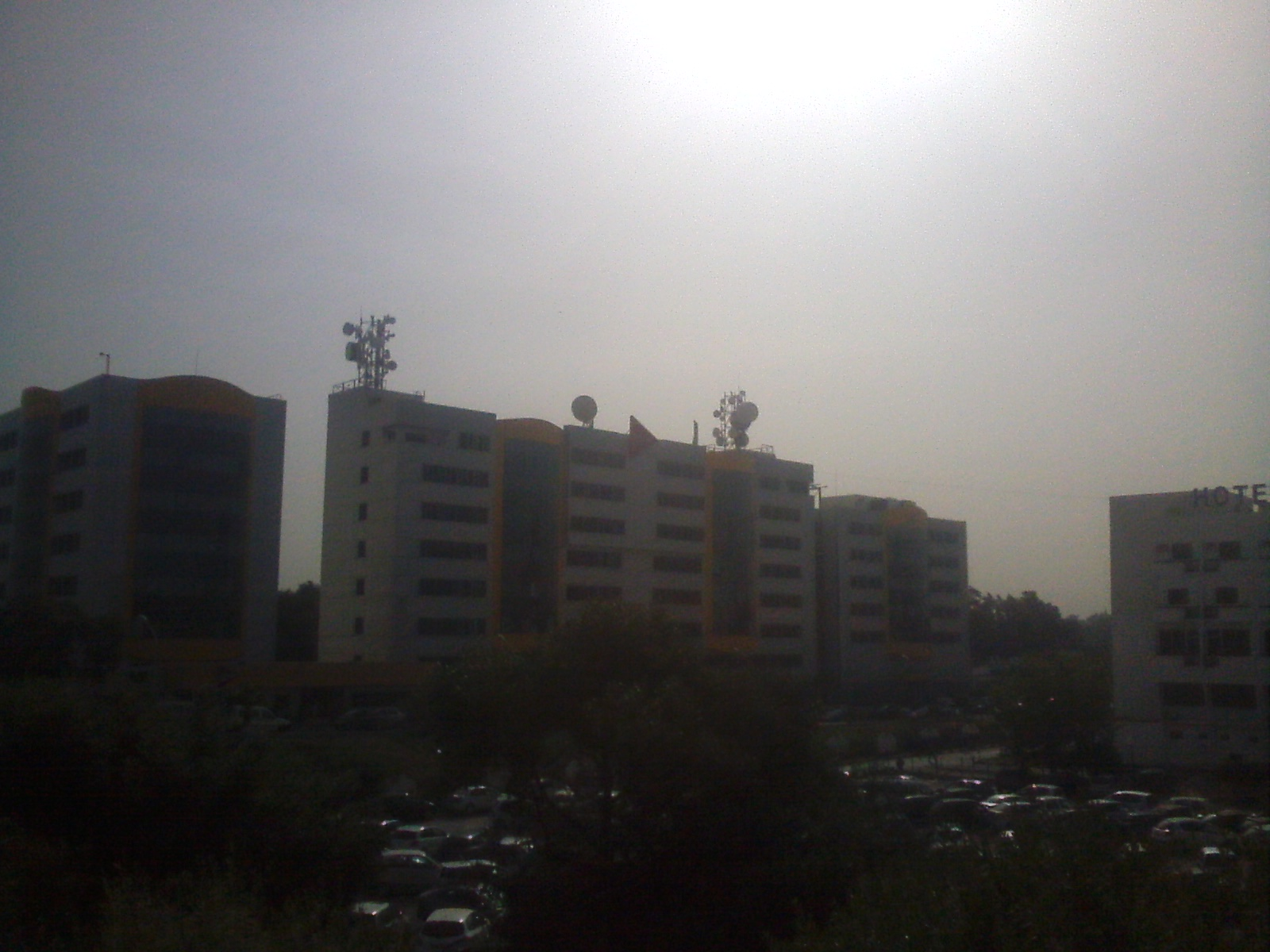
Djezzy Company

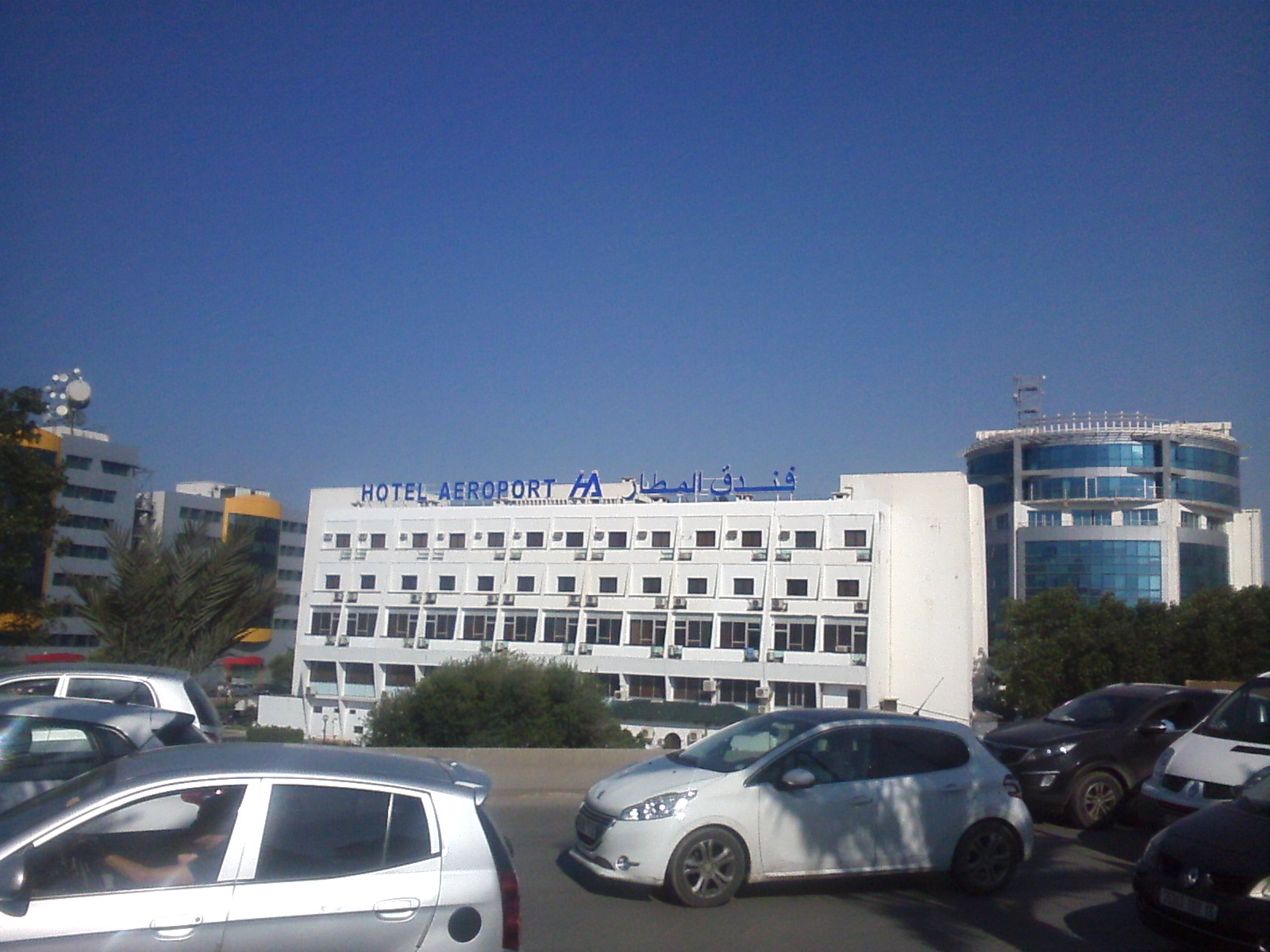
Airport Hotel

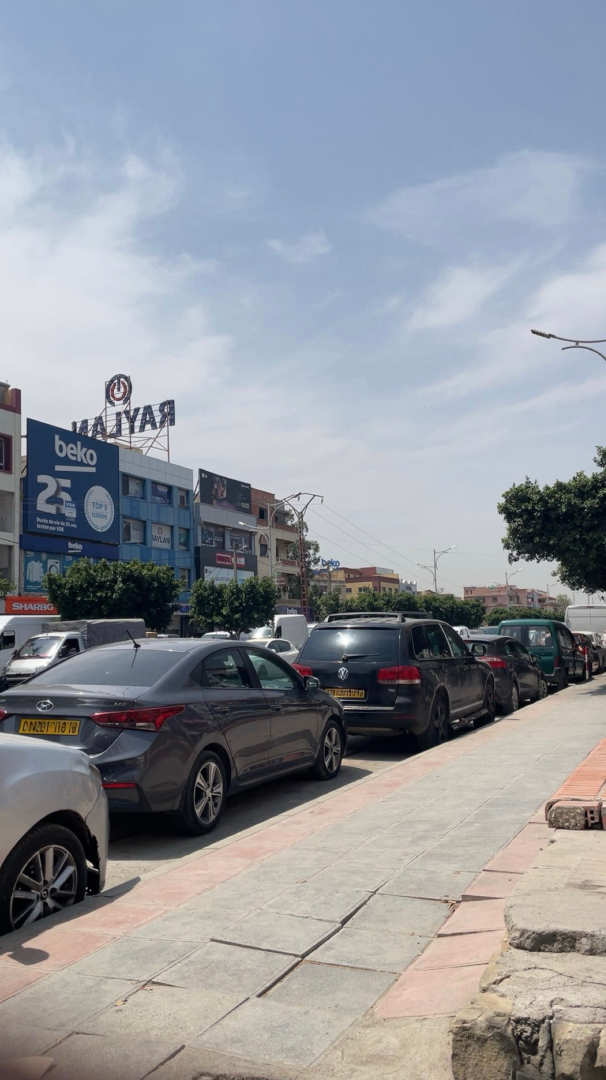
The commercial hub of El Hamiz

== Industrial Sector ==
The industrial zone under the municipality's jurisdiction, extending towards Oued Smar, houses production units and the headquarters of several major national companies, including:

- Pharmal Unit: Affiliated with the public group Saidal, specializing in the manufacturing of medicines and pharmaceutical products.
- National Public Works Company (SNTP): Whose main and administrative headquarters are located within the municipality's territory (specifically along National Road No. 5).
- National Civil Engineering and Building Company (GCB): Affiliated with the Sonatrach group, which maintains technical offices and key directorates (such as the Engineering and Procurement Directorate) within Dar El Beïda.
- Cosider Group Subsidiaries: The industrial zone hosts the headquarters of several subsidiaries of Cosider, Algeria's largest public works group, notably Cosider Construction and Cosider Engineering.

== Transport and Communications ==
The municipality of Dar El Beïda serves as a major transport hub in Algiers, home to several key infrastructure facilities. Its infrastructure is distributed as follows:

- Aviation: Houari Boumediene International Airport is located entirely within the boundaries of the municipality and is the country's main international airport. It has been managed by the "Société de Gestion des Services et Infrastructures Aéroportuaires" (SGSIA) since 2006. The airport includes terminals for international and domestic flights, a logistics cargo area, as well as a military airbase.
- Railways and Metro: The SNTF-managed Airport Station directly connects the municipality to Agha railway station in central Algiers. The municipality is also experiencing major extension works for the Algiers Metro line (El Harrach - Airport Line), which extends over a distance of 9.5 kilometers and includes 9 stations.
- Road Network: The municipality enjoys a strategic location as the eastern gateway to the capital, forming a major interchange where several key roads converge, notably the South Ring Road (Rocade Sud) and the Moutonnière. Its territory is also intersected by National Road No. 5 (RN5), and the municipality serves as a main access point for traffic heading from Algiers towards the East-West Highway.
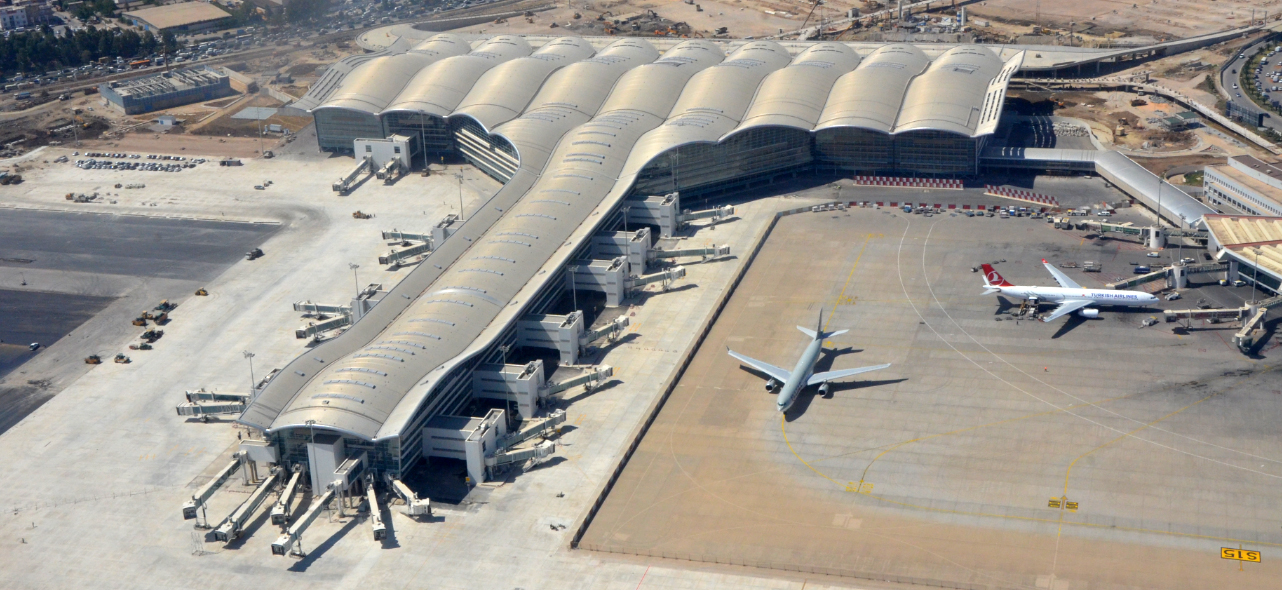
Airport West Terminal (2018)

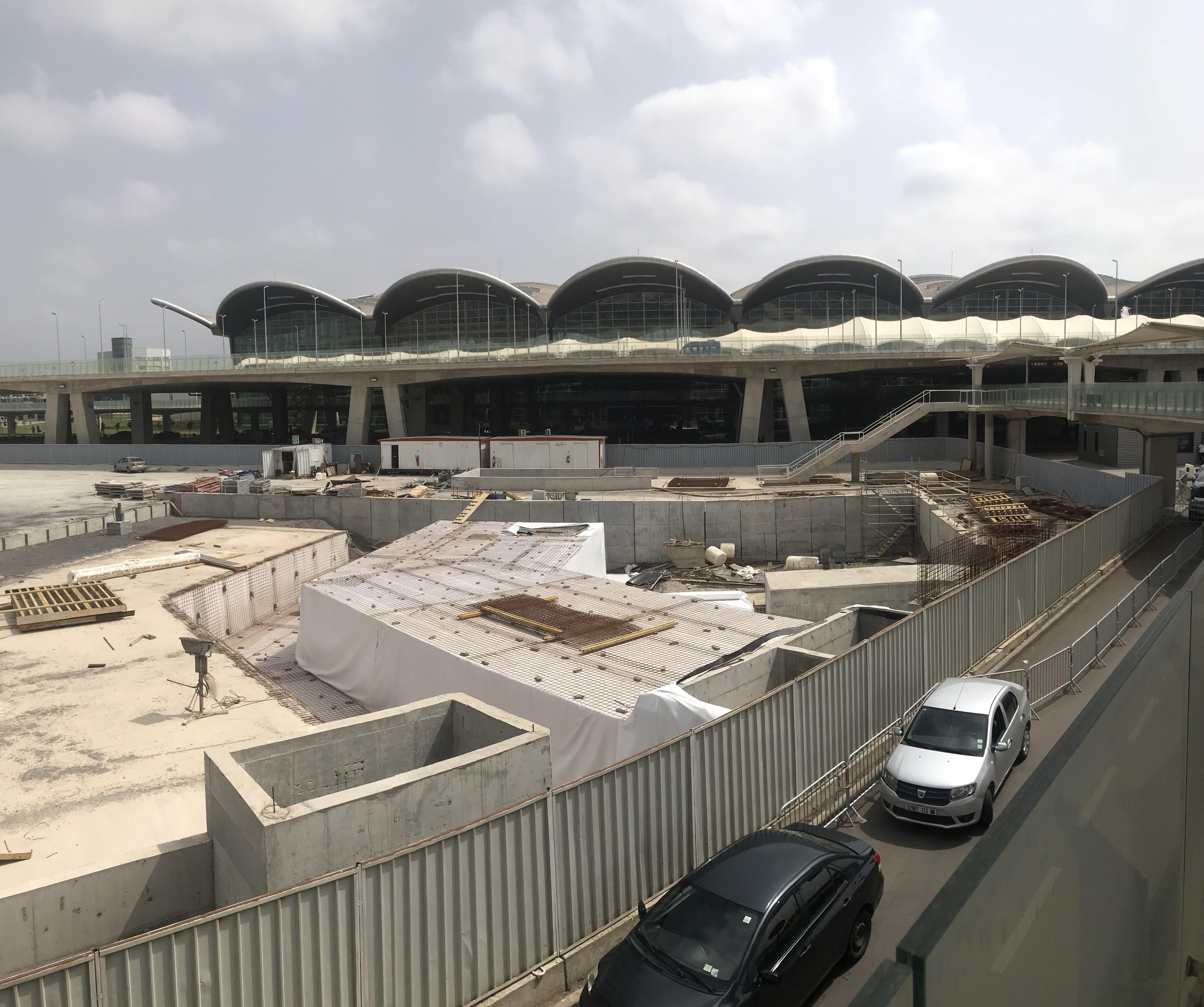
Airport Metro Station (under construction) (2019)

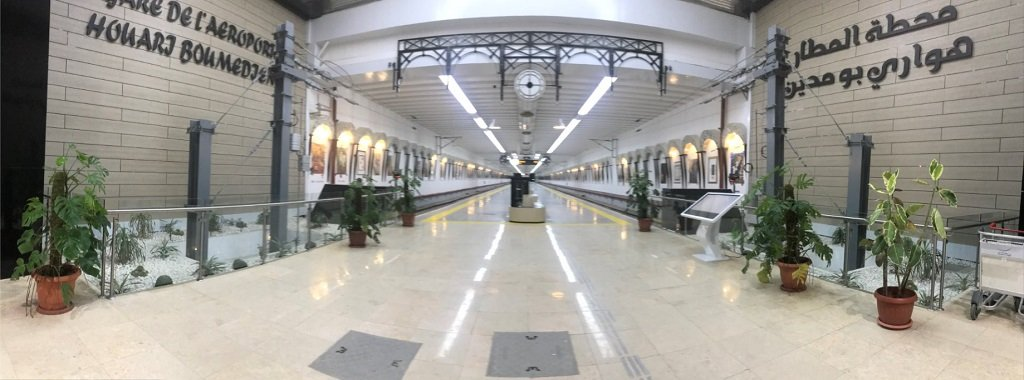
Airport - Agha Train Station (2021)

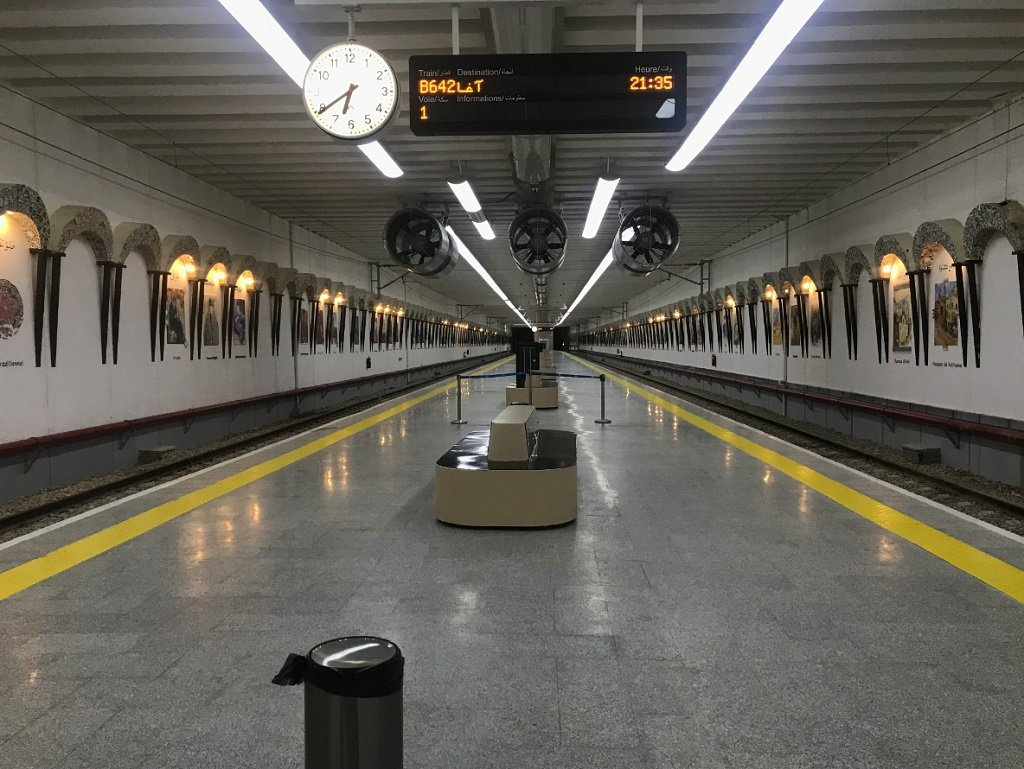
Airport-Agha Train (2021)

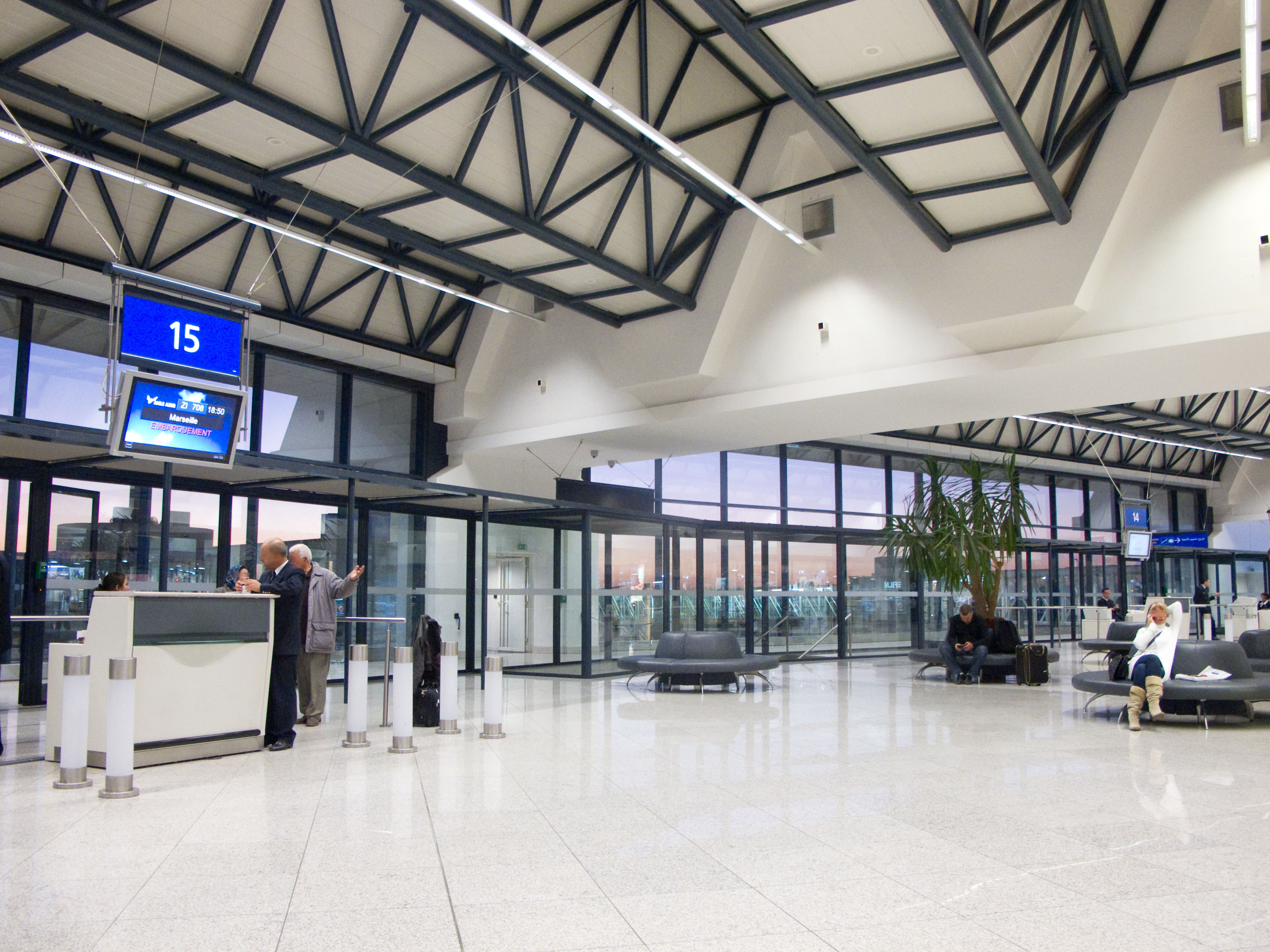
Dar El Beïda Airport (2010)

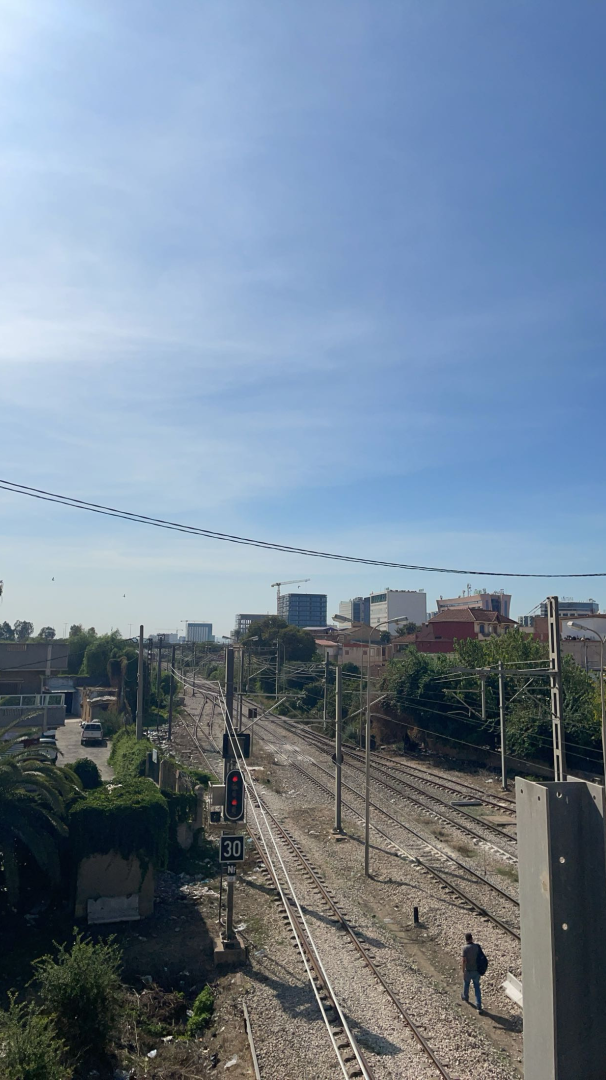
Dar El Beïda railways overlooking the Algiers financial district in Bab Ezzouar

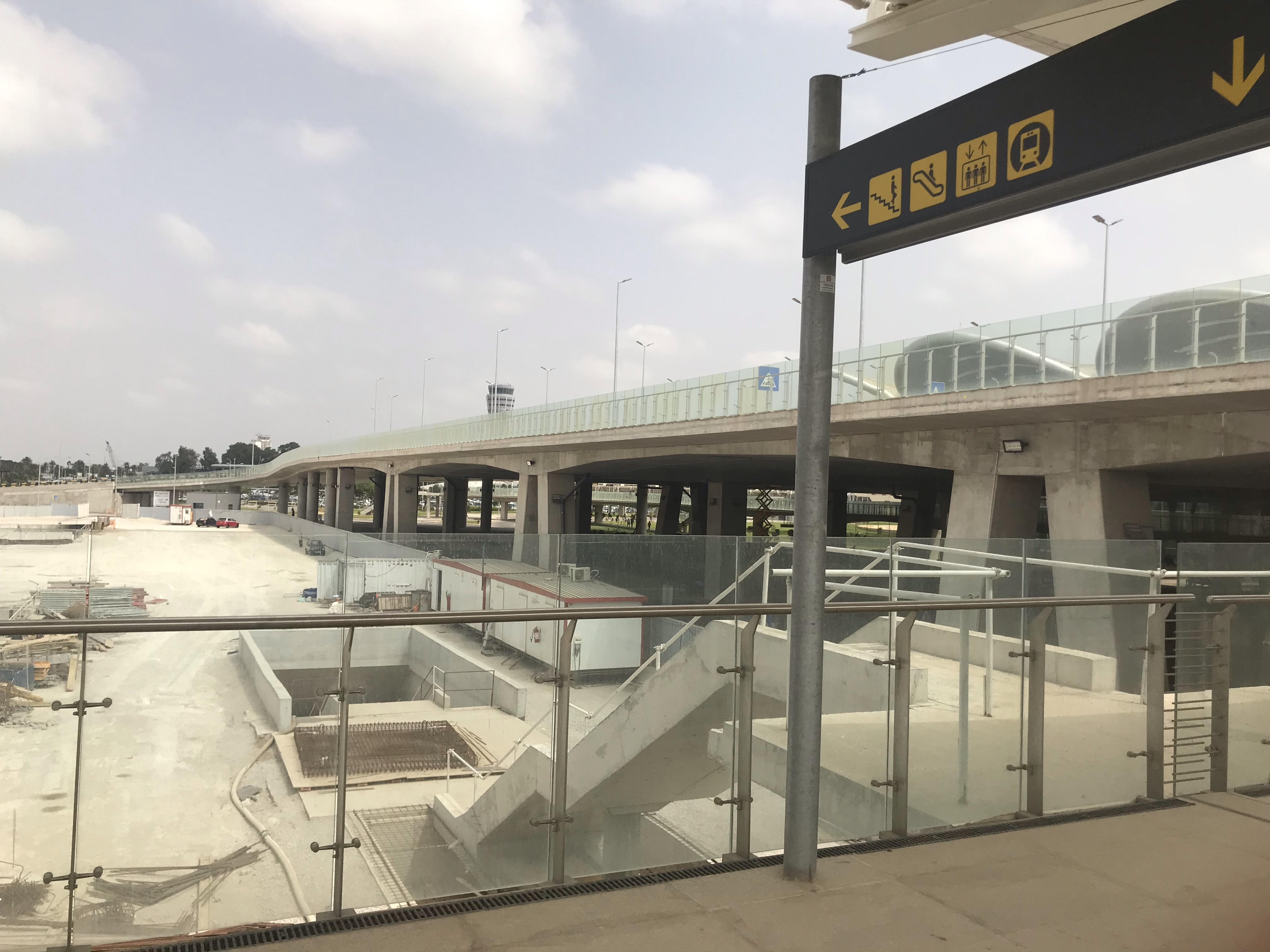
Airport Metro Station (under construction) (2019)

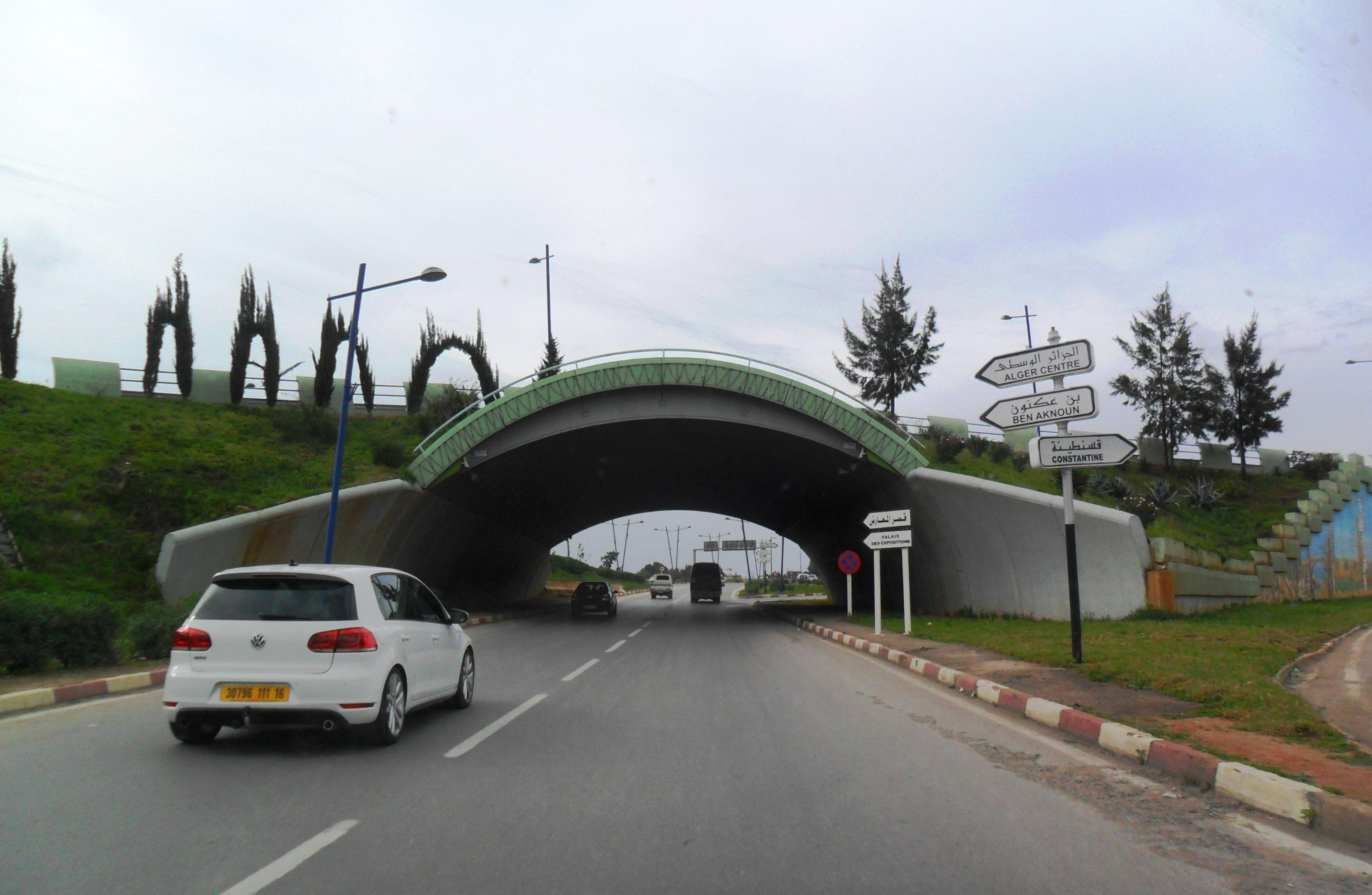

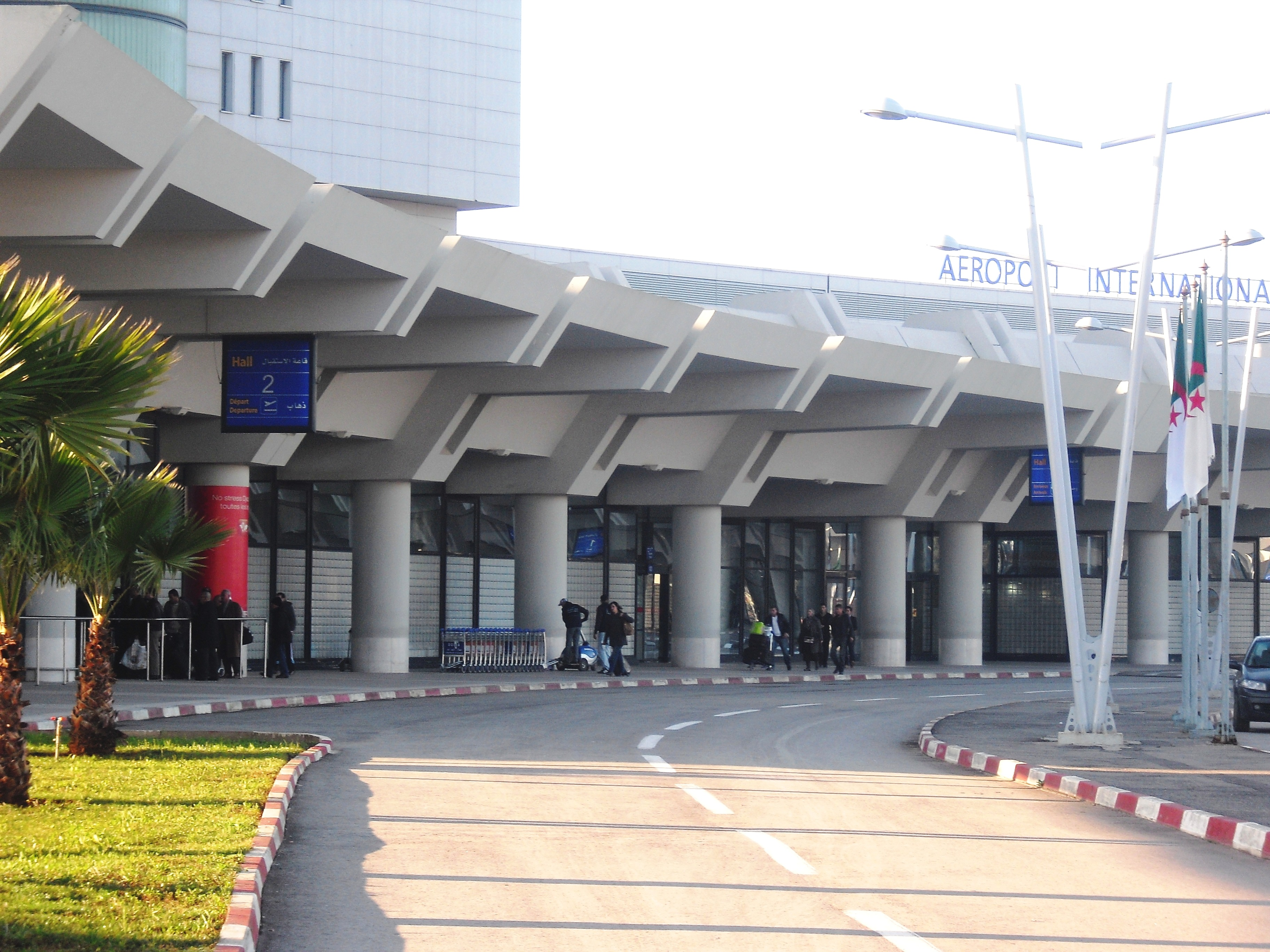
Airport (2011)

== National institutions and facilities ==
=== Security facilities ===
- National Center for the Production of Secure Titles and Documents: responsible for issuing biometric passports and national identity cards and it is one of only two hubs nationally, with the Laghouat center covering the needs of the southern regions.
- Directorate of the Republican Security Units (Headquarters of Moudjahid Mohamed Kenifad): It is one of the largest security bases in the capital.
- Intervention Units of the Civil Protection: The municipality has specialized units trained to respond to aviation accidents and industrial fires.

=== Scientific and technical agencies ===
- National Office of Meteorology (ONM): headquarters of the national meteorological observation network, serving air navigation and agriculture.
- National School of Meteorology: It is the only educational institution in Algeria specialized in training meteorologists and engineers.

== Neighborhoods ==
Several neighborhoods are located in the municipality of Dar El Beïda, including: El Kour (New City), 20 August neighborhood, El Hamiz, Krim Belkacem, 150 Housing, Haouch Attar, and the El Oumal neighborhood.

== See also ==
- Algiers Province
- Municipalities of Algeria
