= El Hamiz =

Suburb and commercial zone of Dar El Beïda

El Hamiz حي الحميز
- Commercial and residential suburb in Algiers
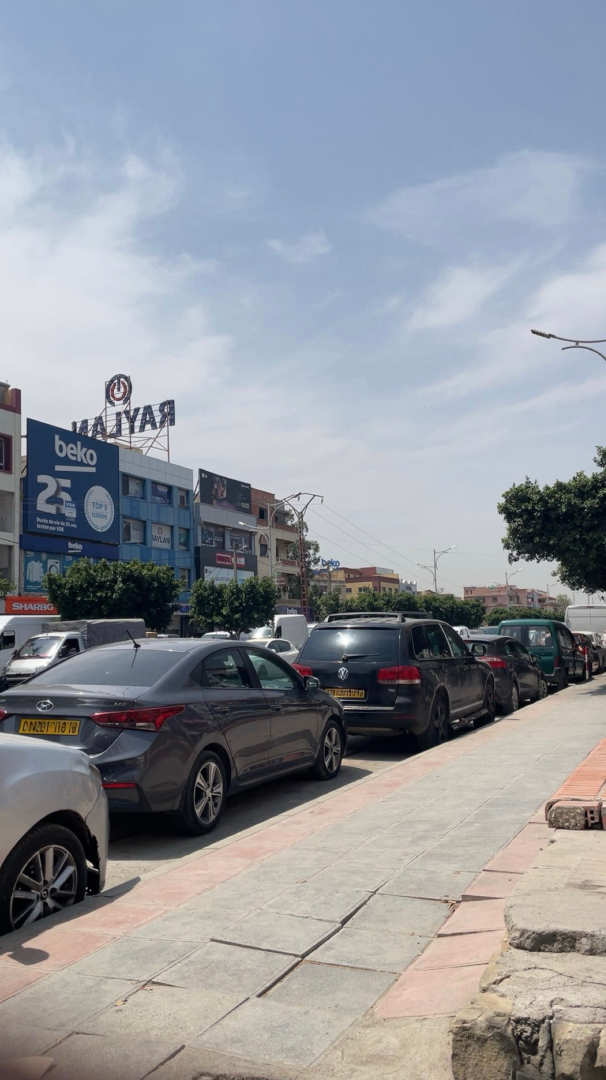
- National Road 5 (N5) during peak hours

- Location of El Hamiz within Algeria
- Coordinates: 36.729819°N 3.230513°E
- Country: Algeria
- Province: Algiers Province
- District: Dar El Beïda District
- Municipality: Dar El Beïda

Population (2016)
  - Total: 46,000

El Hamiz (Arabic: الحميز; Tifinagh: ⴻⵍ ⵀⴰⵎⵉⵣ) is a commercial and residential suburb in the municipality of Dar El Beïda in Algiers, Algeria, with a population of approximately 46,000 as of 2016.

Historically, the locality was known as Haouch El Bey, as it formed an agricultural estate belonging to the Bey of Constantine during the Ottoman era. The suburb's current name is derived from El Hamiz Valley, which flows adjacent to the area. State media and academic studies describe it as one of the main commercial and logistics hubs in the Algerian capital. Research published in spatial and geopolitical journals describes El Hamiz as a central node within transnational trade networks often referred to as the contemporary New Silk Road, connecting Algerian markets with manufacturing centers in China, serving as a primary national hub for the trade of home appliances, electronics, construction materials, and electrical goods.

On an economic level, El Hamiz acts as a link between the Algerian market and international suppliers. Economic reports indicate that the suburb is considered a major commercial center alongside the city of El Eulma, attracting local merchants and representatives of foreign companies, particularly from China.

== Early history ==
=== Ottoman era and the region's beginnings ===
Historically, the region was known to locals as Haouch El Bey, as its lands formed an agricultural estate belonging to the Bey of Constantine, the last known owner before 1830. During that period, the area was dominated by swamps and was primarily used for livestock grazing. It did not witness permanent year-round settlement, serving instead as a transit point for tribes and their movements.

=== Agricultural and urban transformation ===
After 1849, the lands were sold and their ownership was transferred to the settler Trémol Perez, who initiated the draining of the swamps and land reclamation, preparing them for agriculture and horse breeding. Later, the Camps family acquired land in the region. In 1912, Antoine Camps, a viticulture landowner, built a mansion known as Château Camps. The château featured a tower, gardens, water fountains, and wrought iron gates.

Early industry in the area included the Gener brick factory, established in 1885. The region is associated with prominent figures and events, such as Jean Camps (Antoine's son), who was one of the first aviators in Algeria, and the use of the château as a headquarters by the British Army during World War II in 1942.

Historical photos of El Hamiz

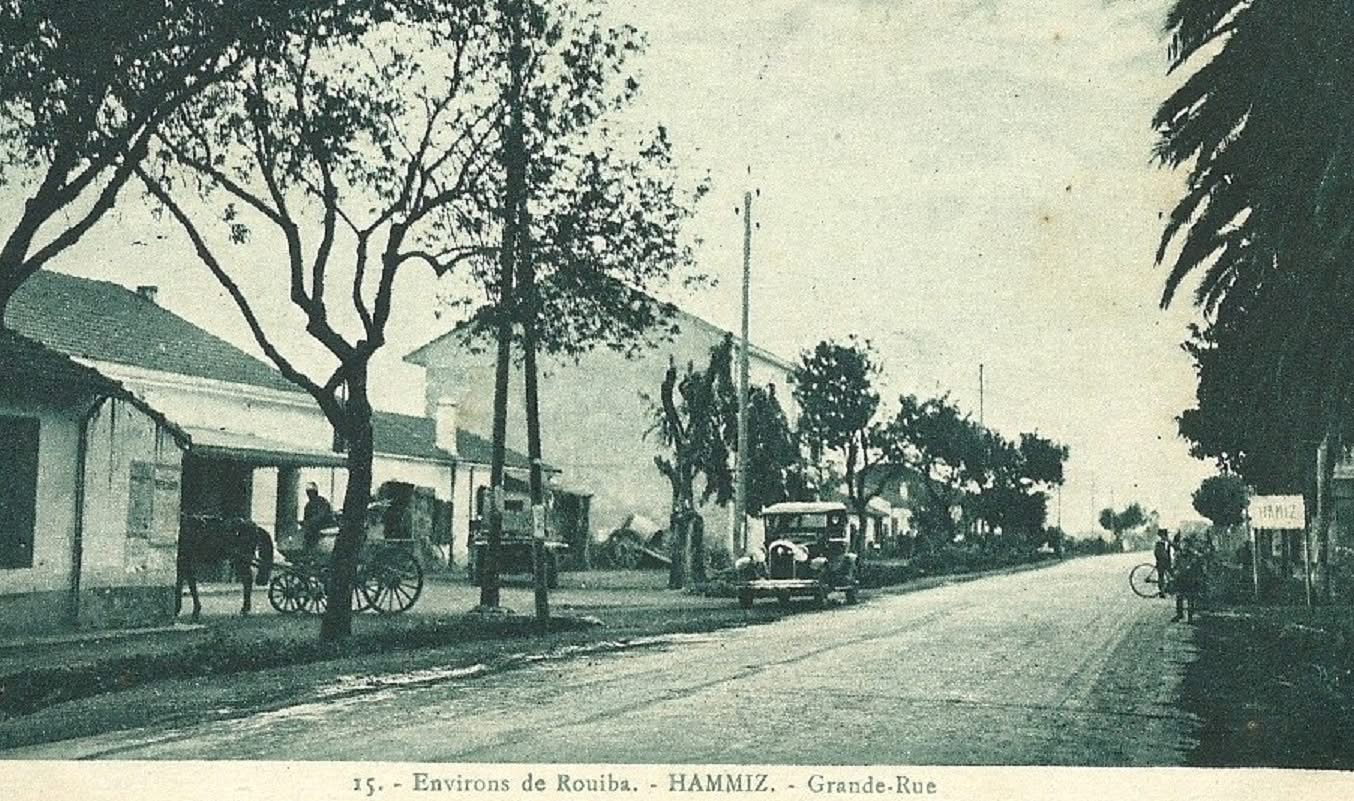
El Hamiz in 1924

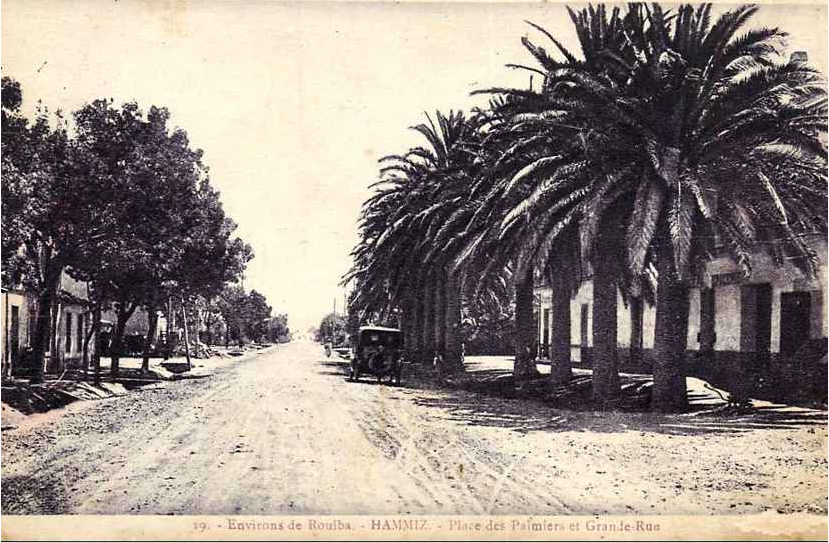
Palm Tree Square and the Main Street of El Hamiz in the past.

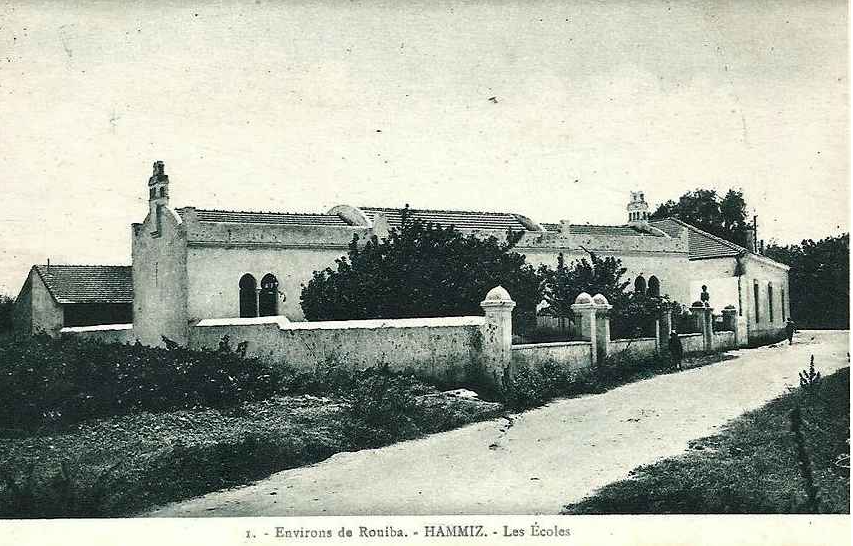
The Old Schools of El Hamiz: A testament to early human settlement.

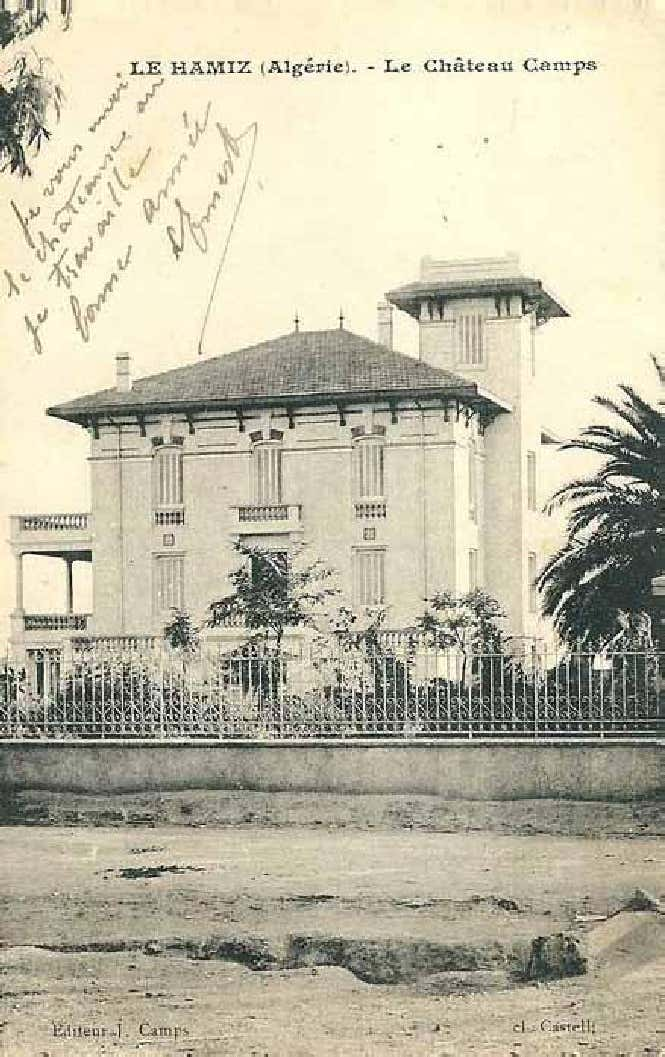
Château Camps circa 1917.

=== Post-independence ===
Following the independence of Algeria, the château and its lands passed to the Algerian state. Over time, the historic building suffered from neglect and was severely damaged by earthquakes, most notably the 2003 Boumerdès earthquake, which caused the collapse of the château's tower, leaving the building in a state of significant deterioration.

=== Transformation into a commercial hub ===
With the expansion of the Algerian capital and economic liberalization, the El Hamiz region gradually lost its agricultural character. Due to its location, the area transitioned from agricultural land into a major commercial and logistics center specializing in wholesale and retail trade.

== Location and geography ==
El Hamiz is located in the eastern Mitidja plain. It is bordered to the west by the municipality of Bab Ezzouar, to the east by the municipality of Rouiba, and to the north by the municipality of Bordj El Kiffan. The suburb is administratively affiliated with the municipality of Dar El Beïda, which ranks first among Algiers Province municipalities in annual financial resources according to the Ministry of Interior's 2012 classification.

The area is located in the eastern suburbs of Algiers, adjacent to the East–West Highway.

The area derives its name from the El Hamiz Valley, a watercourse originating from the Tell Atlas mountains, passing through several provinces before emptying into the Mediterranean Sea between the municipalities of Bordj El Kiffan and Bordj El Bahri.

== Economic and commercial structure ==
El Hamiz functions as a national commercial hub, with activity spanning multiple sectors. The area houses showrooms and warehouses for national and international brands, serving as a distribution center for home appliances, electronics, and kitchenware. It is also considered one of the main suppliers of IT equipment, networking hardware, and security systems.

The district contains distribution centers for electrical materials, including cables, lighting systems, panels, and sockets, alongside shops selling hardware, workshop equipment, industrial machinery, sanitary plumbing supplies, ceramics, and central heating devices. The area also includes a market for automotive spare parts and vehicles. The SNTP zone specializes in the wholesale trade of clothing, textiles, and footwear, named after its historical proximity to the depots of the National Company for Public Works. The district also houses headquarters for import companies and freight forwarding agencies.

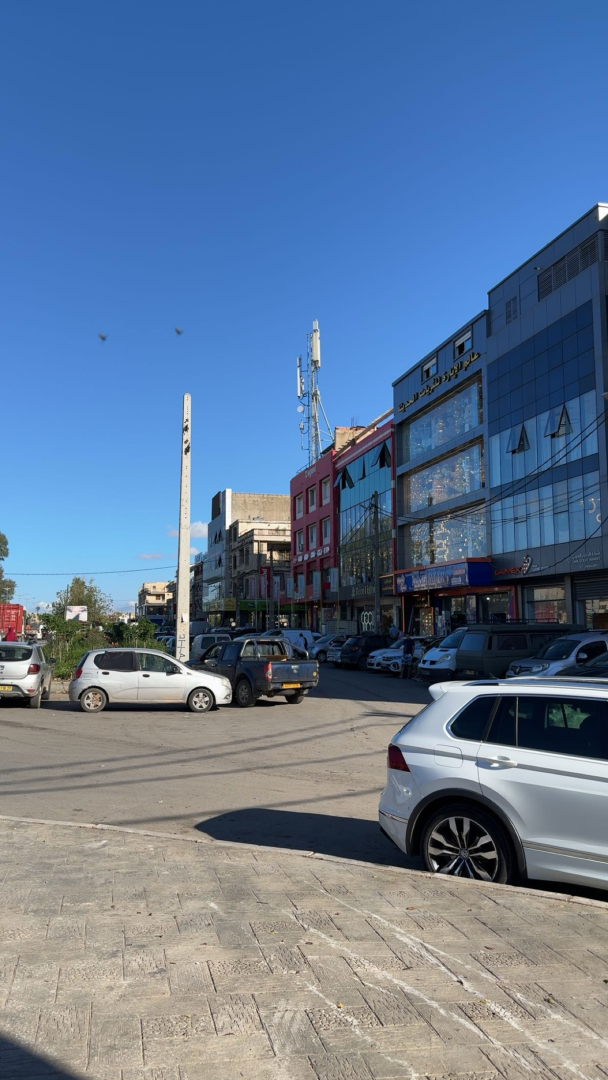
SNTP area in El Hamiz

== Connection to the global trade network ==
El Hamiz, alongside the city of El Eulma, is considered one of the main commercial centers within the contemporary trade network connecting Chinese suppliers to local and regional markets. Academic studies indicate that this transnational trade axis connects manufacturing centers in the city of Yiwu with the warehouses of El Hamiz. The district functions as a distribution center for consumer goods, electronics, and industrial equipment imported from Asia. This commercial activity has contributed to the emergence of a residential–warehouse architectural style, where ground floors serve as showrooms or warehouses while the upper floors are used for housing.

== Urban challenges and regulatory plans ==
Interweaving of residential and commercial spaces

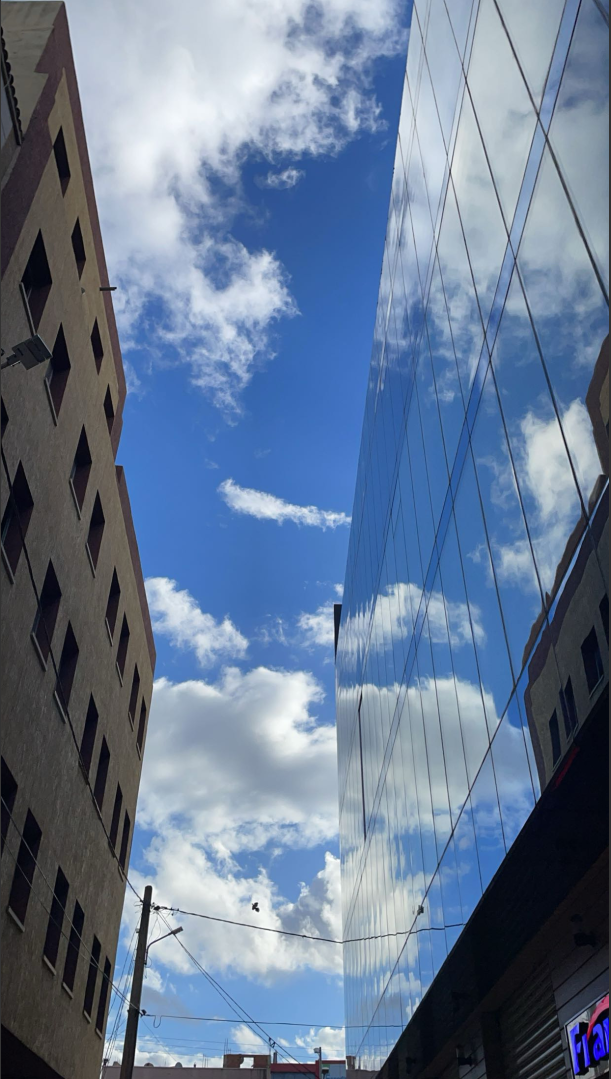
buildings in El Hamiz

El Hamiz is a multifunctional zone integrating housing, commerce, and services. The residential-warehouse model allows merchants to operate from the same building where they reside, giving merchants direct access to their premises. this spontaneous growth precedes regulatory planning, where the 'house-warehouse' model exerts enormous pressure on infrastructure. Loading and unloading operations occupy street space, which contributes to recurring traffic congestion in the area.

The government has attempted to reorganize commercial activity or relocate the market to other areas, for example in 2016. However, these steps faced complex practical challenges due to the scale of commercial activity, which includes more than 2,000 wholesale merchants, and the shop owners' adherence to their documented activities with official commercial registers and property ownership. This made relocating the commercial hub difficult.

El Hamiz faces logistical and urban challenges linked to its commercial activity. The main traffic axes, especially the entrances to National Road 5, experience traffic congestion during peak hours. The causes of this congestion stem from the continuous flow of heavy trucks and cargo containers heading towards dry ports and major warehouses in the area.

El Hamiz was included in Algiers Province's "Yellow Plan" to manage these traffic issues.

== Logistics and infrastructure ==
The area benefits from logistics infrastructure, owing to its proximity to Houari Boumediene Airport (approximately 5 kilometers away) and several dry ports that facilitate customs clearance and storage operations.

== Administrative facilities ==
The district hosts several national institutions, including the National Center for the Production of Secure Documents and Records, responsible for issuing biometric passports, national identity cards, and electronic driver's licenses for Algiers Province and the northern region of the country. It is one of two such centers in Algeria, with a second center in Laghouat covering the needs of the southern regions. El Hamiz is also the site of the national command headquarters for the Directorate of Republican Security Units (URS), named after Mujahid Mohamed Knifid in July 2024, which serves as the main base for riot control and rapid intervention forces affiliated with the National Security. The National Company for Public Works (SNTP) is also located in the district, operating as a public enterprise for infrastructure projects such as roads, bridges, and airports.

== Gallery ==
El Hamiz

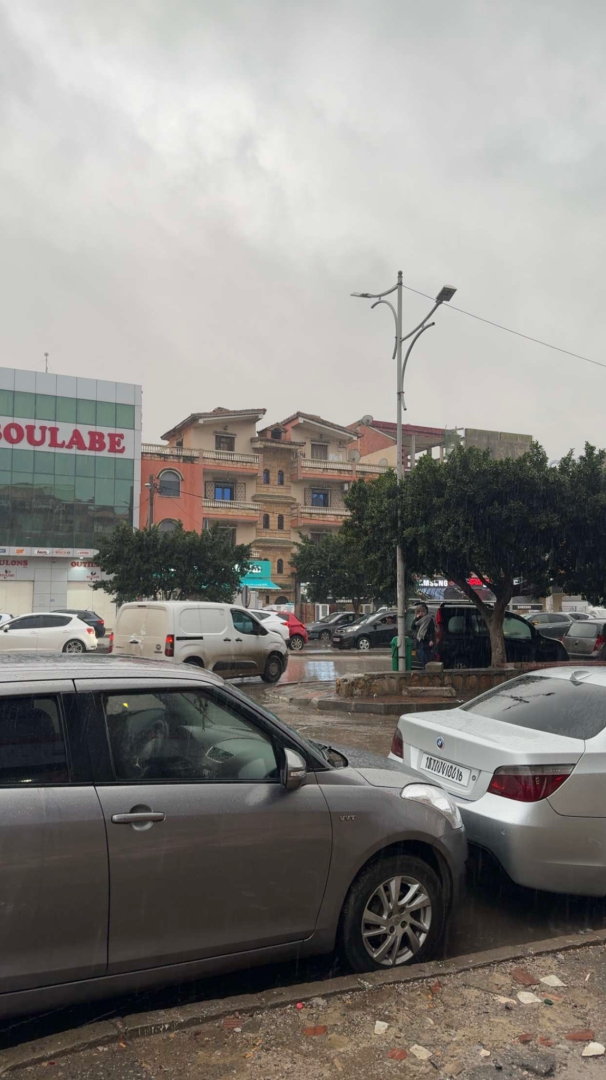
A photo of Hamiz center during the rain

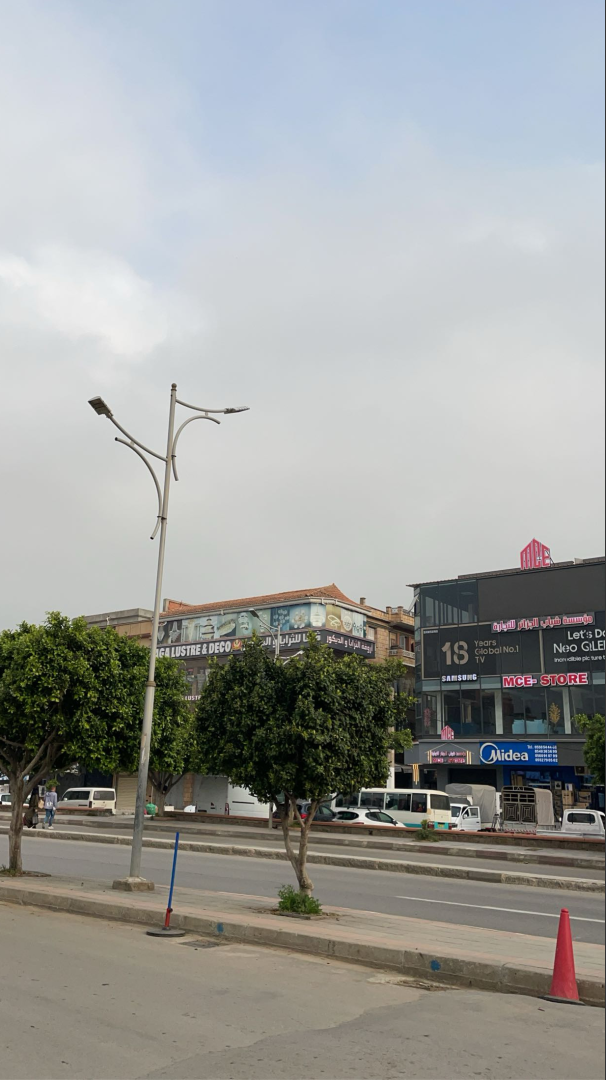
National Road 5 in El Hamiz during the morning

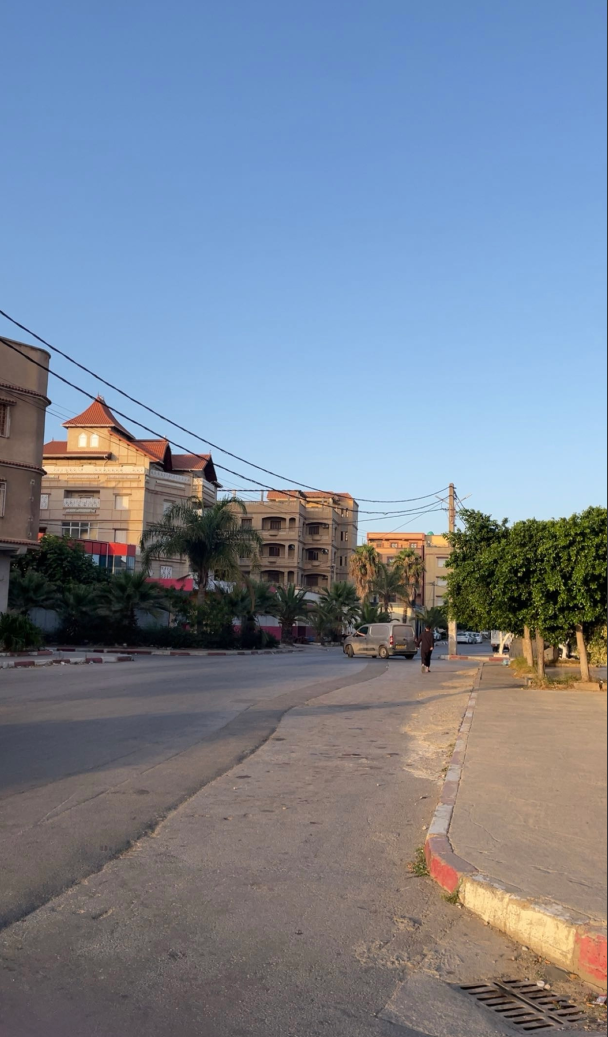
El Hamiz secondary road at sunset

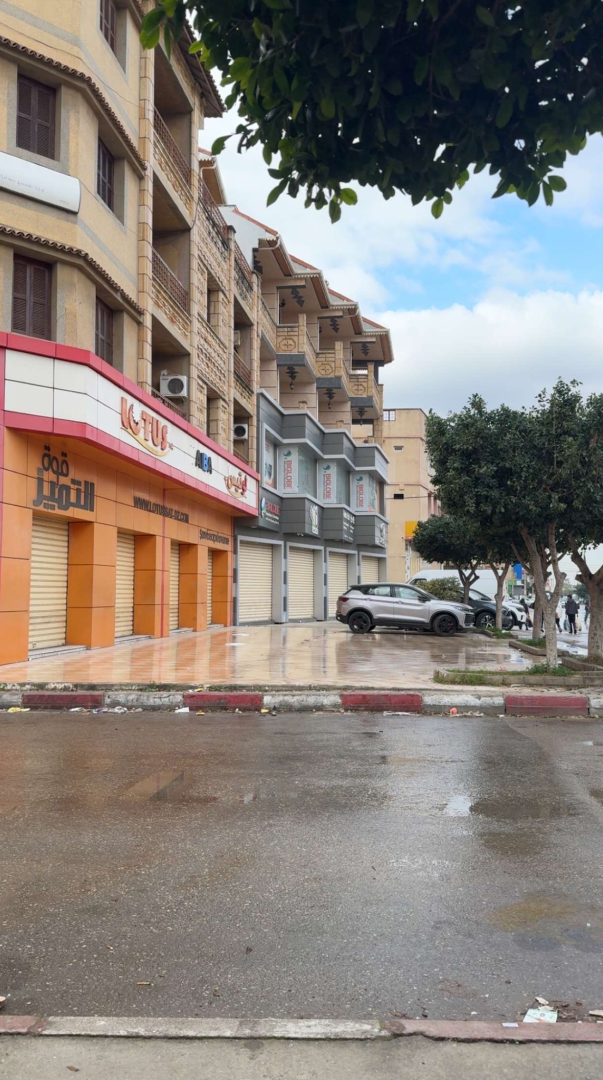
A photo of one of the secondary road during the rain

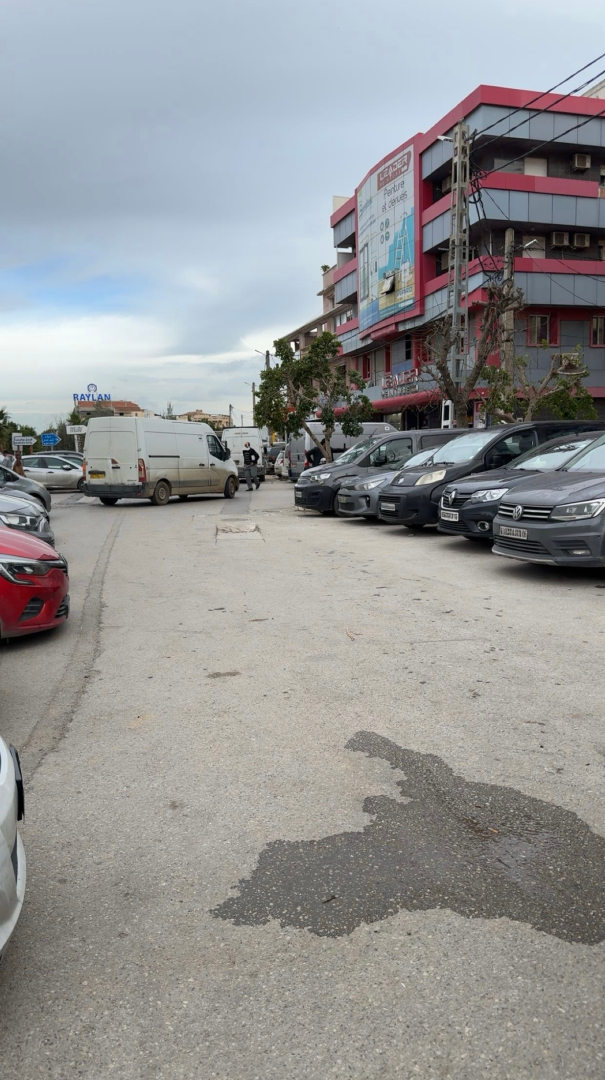
A photo of one of the secondary road in Hamiz

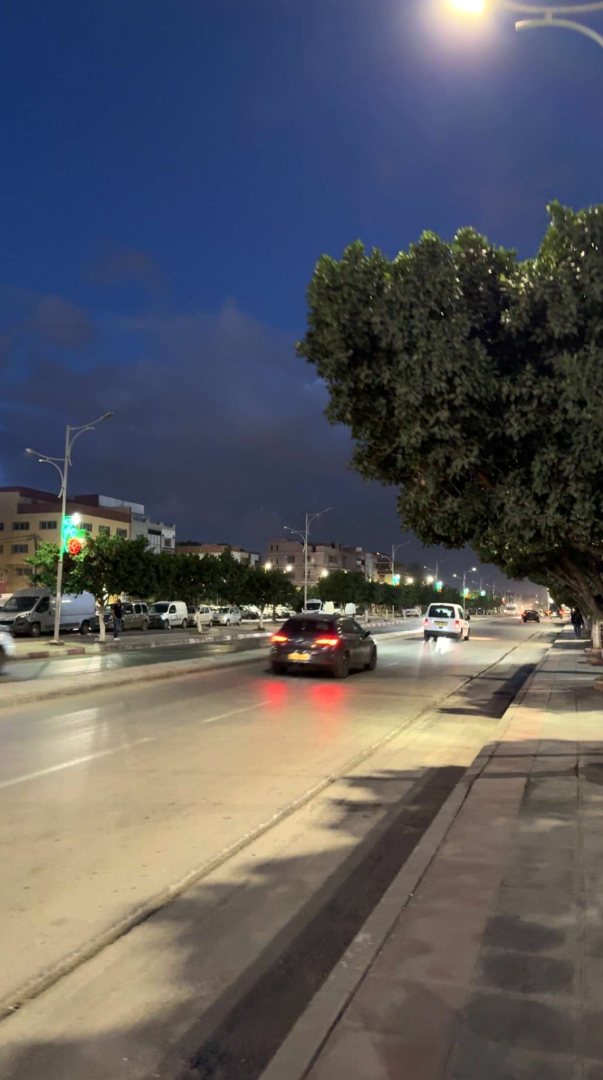
A photo of National Road 5 towards Bab Ezzouar at night

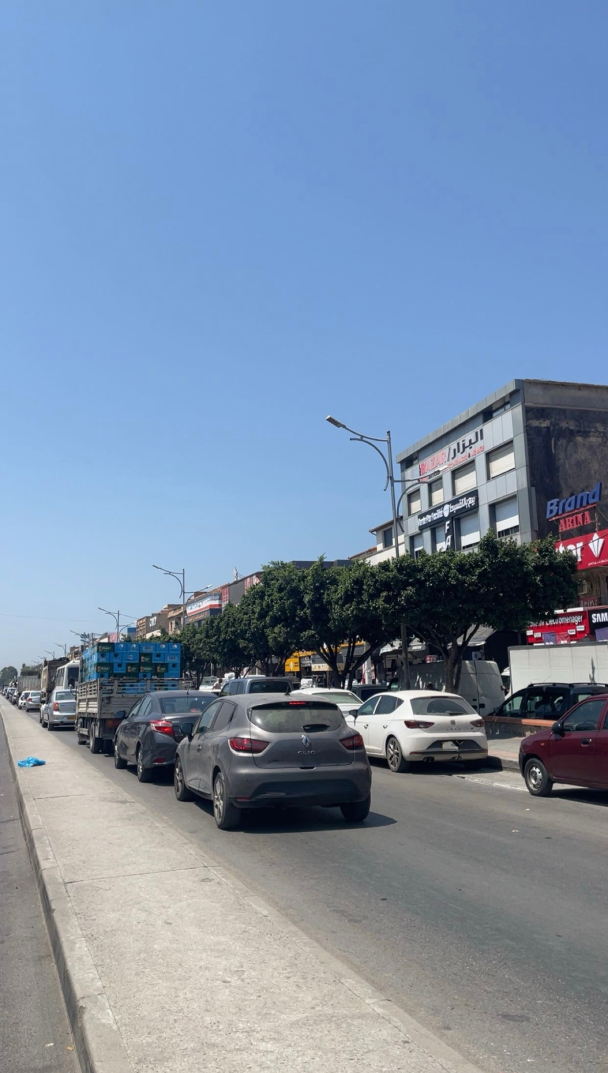
National Road 5 in El Hamiz towards Bab Ezzouar

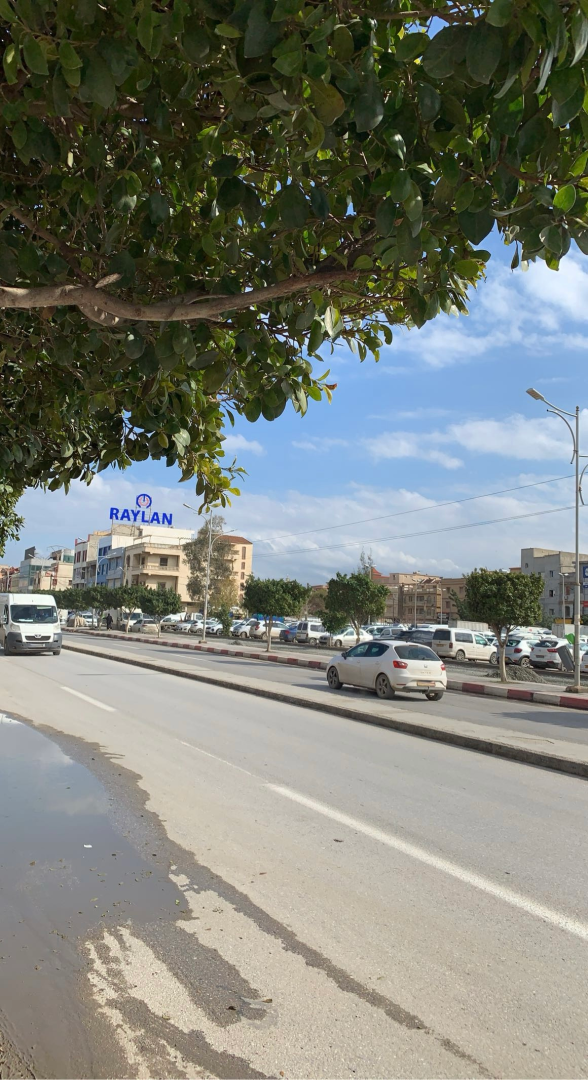
National Road 5 El Hamiz after 5 PM

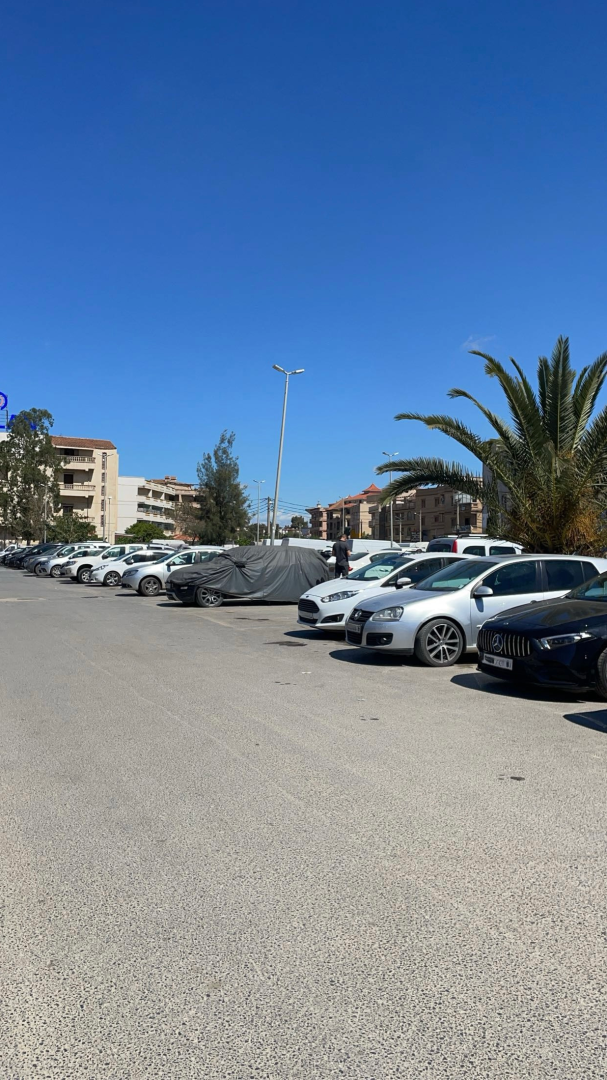
El Hamiz parking lot

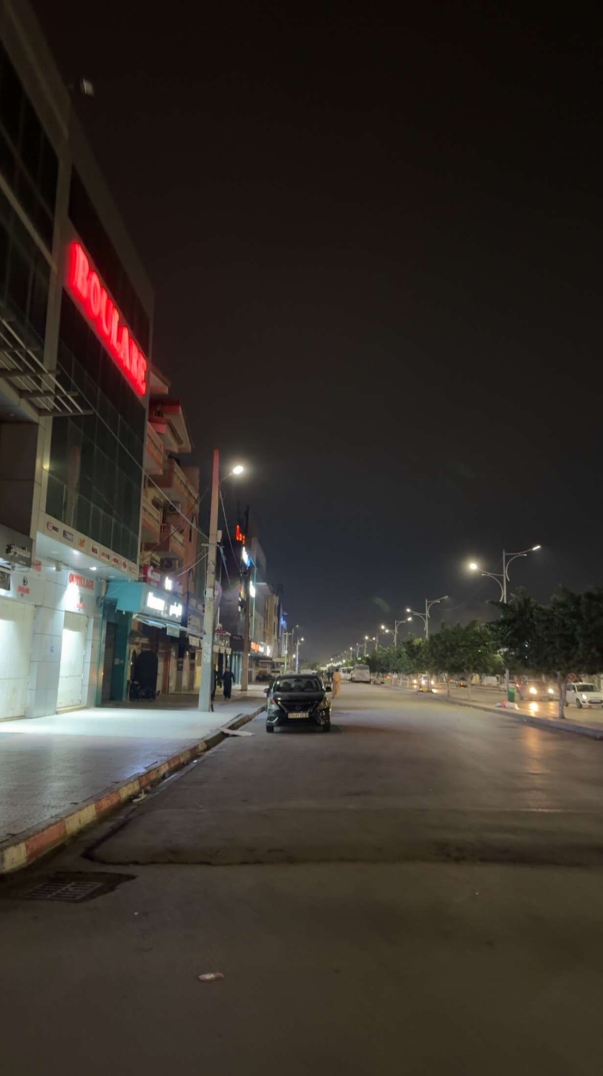
A photo of Hamiz center at night
