= Algerian Civil Defence =

National emergency response agency

Algerian Civil Defense
- الحماية المدنية (Protection Civile) ⵜⵖⴻⵍⵍⵉⵙⵜ ⵏ ⵜⵎⴻⵥⵍⵉ
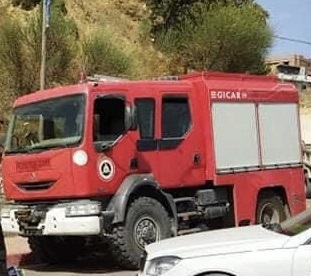
- Algerian FireFighting truck with Algerian Civil Defence logo on the side

Operational area
- Country: Algeria
- Languages: Berber, Arabic, French

Agency overview
- Established: April 15, 1964
- Staffing: 70 000
- Minister: Kamel Beldjoud
- Director: Colonel Boualem Boughlef
- Motto: "save life at the risk of one's own"

Website
- www.protectioncivile.dz

The Algerian Civil Defense (Tamazight:ⵜⵖⴻⵍⵍⵉⵙⵜ ⵏ ⵜⵎⴻⵥⵍⵉ (Latinized: Tɣellist n Tmeẓli) ,French : Protection Civile, Arabic: الحماية المدنية) also known in Algeria as "Les pompiers" is a unit of the Algerian government responsible for firefighting, rescue services, and emergency response.

== History ==
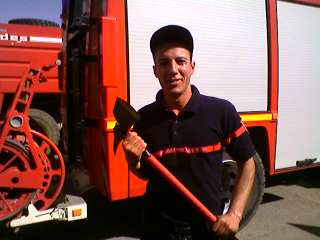
Civil protection officer.

Following the Algerian Revolution and the exit of the French colonial powers in 1962, the responsibility for management of Algerian firefighters fell to individual municipalities. On April 15, 1964, under the Presidency of Ahmed Ben Bella, the National Civil Protection Service was created to standardize and professionalize the corps of Algerian firefighters and rescue workers. However, the municipal administration and financing of the services were left intact.

This structure changed in 1976 when the service was replaced by Algerian Civil Defense, nationalizing administration and day-to-day operations.

Two years after Algeria's independence in 1962, the Algerian National Civil Protection Service was born on the initiative of President Ahmed Ben Bella thanks to Decree No. 64-129 of 15 April 1964. The administrative management and salary of the firefighters were still the responsibility of the municipalities as in the colonial period

This structure changed in 1976 when the service was replaced by Algerian Civil Defense, nationalizing administration and day-to-day operations. Thanks to Decree 76-39 of 20 February 1976, the organisation was completed by the replacement of the former National Civil Protection Service and the creation of the General Directorate of Civil Protection.

In 1991, civil protection was granted financial autonomy. The motto of the Algerian civil protection is: "save life at the risk of one's own"

== Organization ==
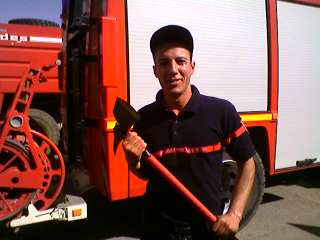
Civil protection officer.

The organization of the Algerian DGPC is set by Decree No. 91-503 of 21 December 1991.

Within the Directorate-General for Civil Protection, there are several directorates such as :

- The Prevention Directorate, which is divided into three sub-directorates (the Sub-Directorate for Studies and Regulation, the Sub-Directorate for Major Risks, and the Sub-Directorate for Statistics and Information) which deal with the activities carried out by civil protection, for studies, and the definition of the general rules and safety standards applicable to prevention, in the various sectors, as well as the control relating to their application.
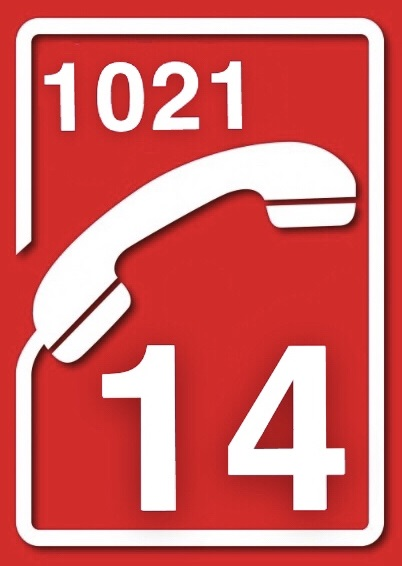
- Algerian numbers for calling Civil Protection.directorates
  The Directorate for the Organisation and Coordination of Relief comprises four sub-(the Sub-Directorate for Operational Planning, the Sub-Directorate for Operations, the Sub-Directorate for Communications and Operational Liaison and the Sub-Directorate for Medical Assistance) which are responsible for studying and defining the means and rules for the organisation, preparation and implementation of relief and the coordination of its progress.
- The Personnel and Training Directorate comprises three sub-directorates (the Personnel Sub-Directorate, the Social Action Sub-Directorate and the Training Sub-Directorate) which are responsible for the management and distribution of human resources, the definition of training policy, the setting of educational programmes and the definition of the rules and conditions for their implementation.
- The Logistics and Infrastructure Directorate comprises three sub-directorates (the Budget and Accounting Sub-Directorate, the Infrastructure Sub-Directorate and the Equipment and Logistics Sub-Directorate) which are responsible for the studies and implementation of infrastructure and equipment programmes, which set and implement the forecasts for appropriations and define and control the conditions for the management and maintenance of infrastructure and infrastructure. Civil Protection Equipment.

In addition, each wilaya has its own regional directorate, these directorates are called the civil protection directorate followed by the name of the wilaya (DPC). There are therefore 58 civil protection directorates in Algeria.

The civil defence also has specialised sections within the main units, such as:

- Reconnaissance and Intervention Group in Perilous Environments (GRIMP)
- Water rescue (divers, water rescuers)
- Sections specialising in technological and chemical risks (decontamination, etc.)
- Clearing rescue units (composed of dog enthusiasts, and rescuers specialized in natural disasters, these are the USAR (Urban Search And Rescue) units)
- Civil protection air group (based in Dar El Beïda, they intervene in particular for the transport of serious injuries or to participate in the manoeuvre of extinguishing forest fires by air, etc.)
- Motorcyclists (rapid response units)
- Technical (consisting of heavy tow trucks and vehicles specialized in vehicle repair and extraction)

== Missions ==
Members of the civil protection have several types of missions, they are also responsible for prevention, first aid training, protection and firefighting. They contribute with the other services and professionals concerned to the protection and fight against other accidents, disasters and disasters, to the assessment and prevention of technological or natural risks as well as to emergency assistance.The members of the civil protection are risk technicians in the first rank who can respond to all types of missions such as the protection of people, property and the environment.The telephone numbers to dial to reach the civil protection in Algeria is 14 or 1021. These are toll-free numbers reserved for emergency lines

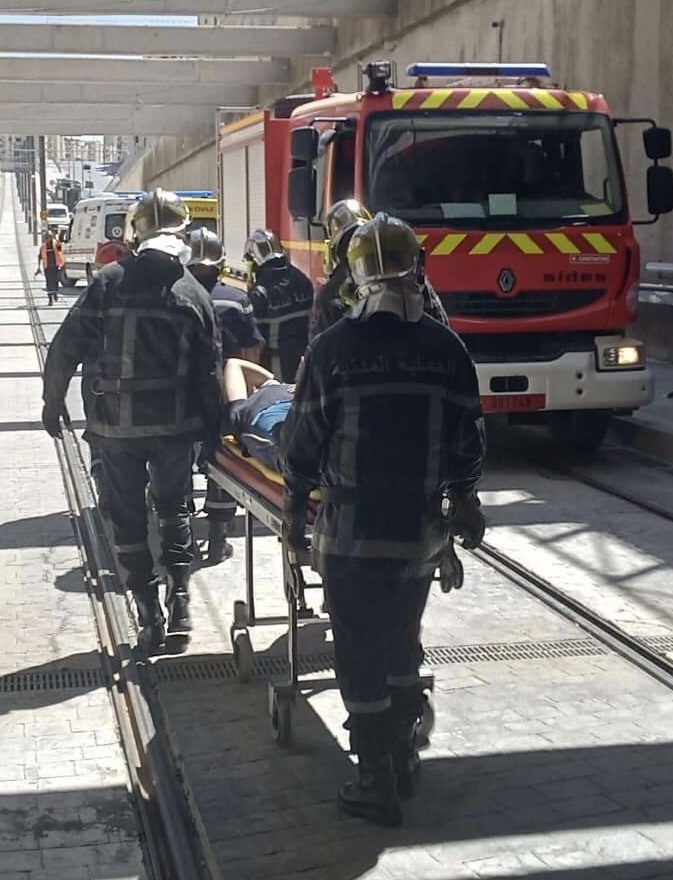
Civil Protection agents during an intervention

=== Rescue of persons (SAP) ===
These are home or public rescues that account for the majority of interventions:

- Rescue on the public highway: injuries on the public highway or in public places, drowning, road, rail, air or navigation traffic accidents.
- Home rescue: domestic accident (fall, burn, asphyxiation, electrocution, drowning) or physical accident (haemorrhage, cardiac arrest, psychological distress, malaise) etc.

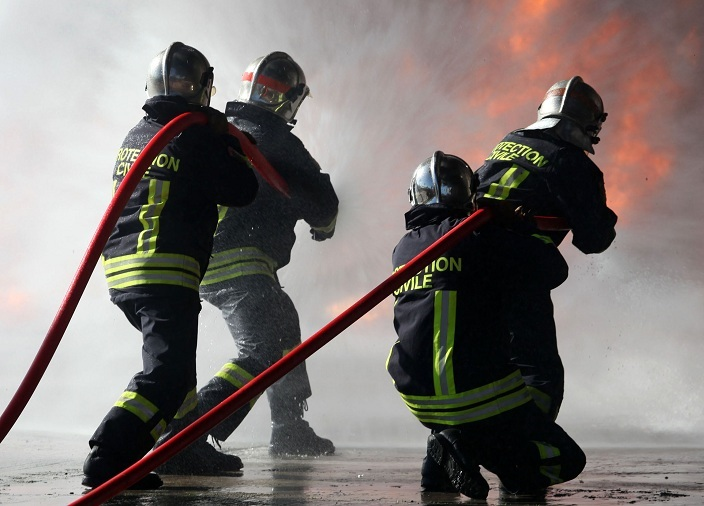
Algerian Firefighters during a fire extinguishing mission

=== Fires ===
House fires, industrial fires, forest fires, etc.

Miscellaneous interventions

Among the operations carried out by the civil protection there are also various interventions such as: the unblocking of lifts, floods, animal rescue, gas leaks, etc.

Training

The civil protection also trains volunteer first aiders, in particular through the national plan "one rescuer per family".

They also train volunteers from the population in first aid.

But also industry professionals, members of security services such as the police or gendarmerie, etc.

Prevention and awareness

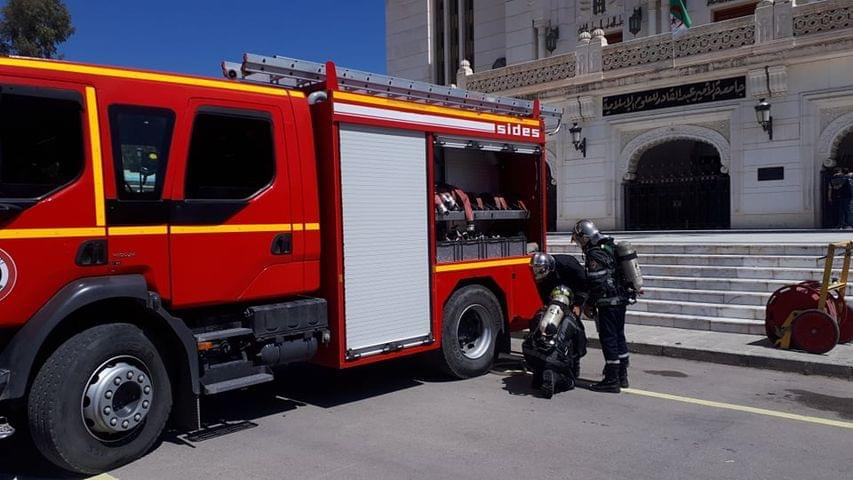
Algerian Civil Protection performing a Maneuvre.

The civil protection also raises awareness and prevents schools and colleges, high schools, and other public institutions in Algeria.

There are several themes, such as the major risks of forest fires, road awareness, various domestic risks, flood risks, technological risks, and seismic risks.

== Uniforms ==
The members of the Algerian Civil Protection have several uniforms:* Intervention uniform: This is the civil protection work uniform, consisting of a midnight blue jacket with a grey stripe as well as trousers and a pair of boots.

- Fire Outfit: This outfit is used during fires or road accidents, it consists of a pair of attack gloves, a helmet, a balaclava, a fire jacket and over-pants.
- Specialized clothing: There are also several types of specialized intervention clothing for specific risks (such as chemical, bacteriological or radioactive risks, etc.).

Uniforms for non-ranks: Uniforms intended for administrative work, outings and ceremonies.

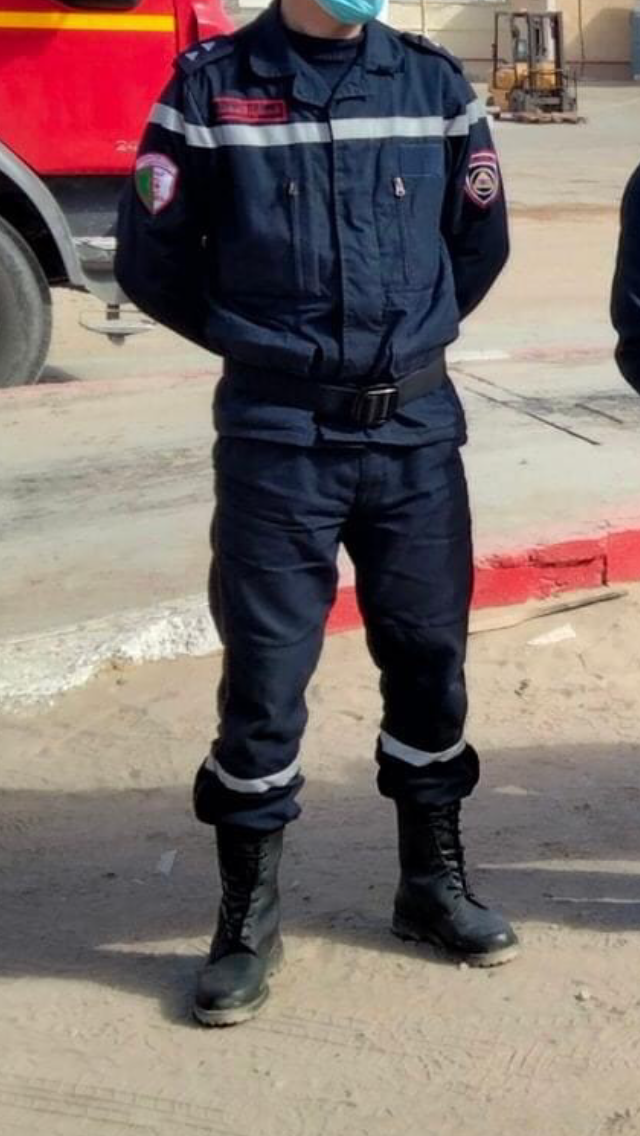
Algerian Firefighter outfit

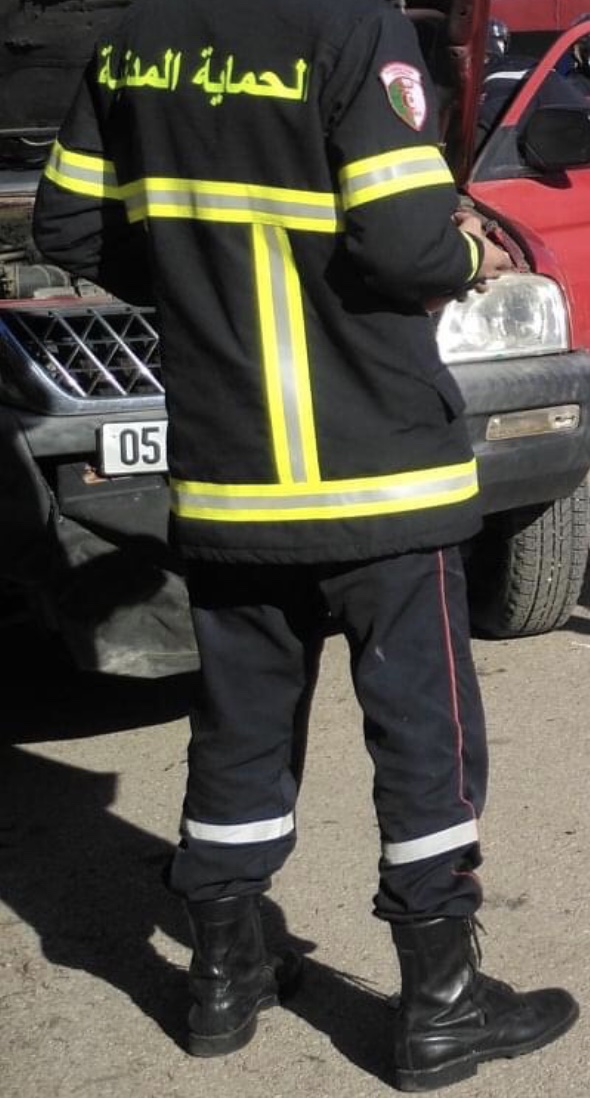
Algerian Civil Protection Fire suit

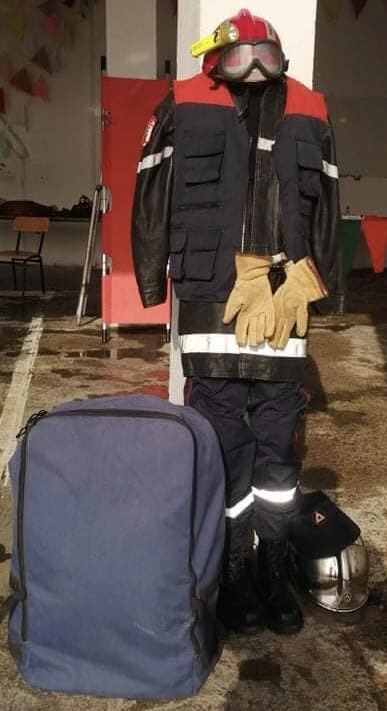
Algerian Civil Protection Forest fire outfit

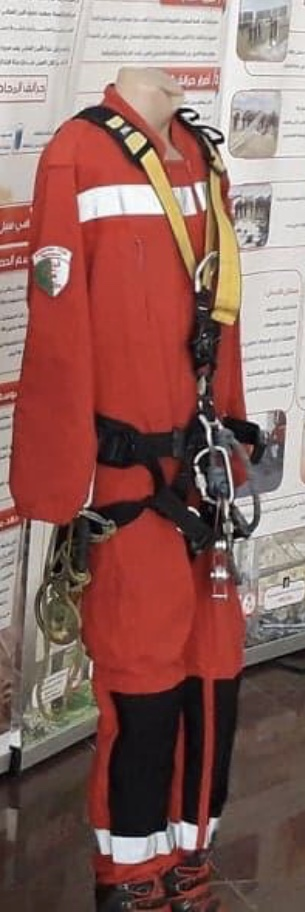
GRIMP suit of Algerian Civil Protection

== Ranks ==
Senior Officers

- Colonel
- Lieutenant colonel
- Commander

Officers

- Captain
- Lieutenant
- Lieutenant

Non-commissioned officers

- Warrant officer
- Sergeant

Rank-and-file

- Master corporal
- Corporal
- Agent

== Equipment ==
=== Fire engines ===
- FPT (Tonne Pump Van)
- FPTL (Light Ton Pump Van)
- FMOGP (High Power Foam Van)
- CCF (Forest Fire Tanker)
- CCFL (Light Forest Fire Tanker)
- CCFM (Medium Forest Fire Tanker)
- CCGC (High Capacity Tanker Truck)
- CCI (Fire Tanker)
- CCR (Rural Tanker)
